= Finzi =

Finzi is a surname. Notable people with the name include:

- Aldo Finzi (politician) (1891–1944), Italian politician
- Aldo Finzi (composer) (1897–1945), Italian composer
- Bruno Finzi (1899–1974), Italian mathematician, engineer, and physicist
- Gerald Finzi (1901–56), British composer

- his wife, Joy Finzi (1907–1991), British artist
- his son, Christopher Finzi (1934–2019), British conductor
- Finzi Trust, founded in 1969 to further the music, ideals and work of Gerald Finzi

- Giuseppe Finzi (1815-1886), Italian politician
- Graciane Finzi (born 1945), French composer
- Itzhak Fintzi (Izko Finzi), (born 1933), Bulgarian film and stage actor
- Mario Finzi (1913–1945), Italian magistrate, judge, and pianist who died in Auschwitz-Birkenau
- Mordechai Finzi (c. 1407–1476), Jewish mathematician, astronomer, grammarian, and physician in Mantua
- Samuel Finzi (born 1966), German actor

== See also ==
- The Garden of the Finzi-Continis, a historical novel by the Italian novelist Giorgio Bassani about the Finzi-Contini family
- The Garden of the Finzi-Continis (film), an adaptation of the novel directed by Vittorio de Sica
- Giuseppina Finzi-Magrini (1878–1944), Italian soprano
