= List of compositions by Gerald Finzi =

The early-twentieth-century British composer Gerald Finzi (1901–1956) is recognized largely for several song cycles, setting texts from a wide selection English poets, including Thomas Traherne, William Shakespeare, John Milton, Christina Rossetti, Thomas Hardy, Robert Bridges and Edmund Blunden. However, his oeuvre includes well-regarded concerti for clarinet and cello, choral works, works for string orchestra, and chamber music.

Born in London, Finzi was of German Jewish and Italian Jewish descent. However, the style of his compositions places him as among the most characteristically "English" composers of his generation. Additionally, despite being agnostic, he wrote a significant amount of inspired and imposing Christian choral music that remains consistently in the performance repertoire.

== List of compositions by opus number ==
The most common method of numbering Finzi's works is by opus number as assigned by his publishers during his lifetime.

Opus Number	Title of composition	Year(s) composed	First performance	Comments	Notes
1	Ten Children’s Songs; Songs to poems by Christina Rossetti	1920-21	-	Scored for unison and two-part voices and piano; Songs: 1. "Rosy Maiden Winifred"; 2. "Dead in the Cold"; 3. "Lullaby, Oh Lullaby!"; 4. "The Lily Has a Smooth Stalk"; 5. "Dancing on the Hill-tops"; 6. "Margaret Has a Milking Pail"; 7. "Ferry Me Across the Water"; 8. "There's Snow on the Fields"; 9. "A Linnet in a Gilded Cage"; 10. "Boy Johnny"	-
2	By Footpath and Stile	1921-22	-	A cycle of six songs scored for baritone soloist and string quartet; Setting of poems by English poet Thomas Hardy; songs: 1. "Paying Call"; 2. "Where the Picnic Was"; 3. "The Oxen"; 4. "The Master and the Leaves"; 5. "Voices from Things Growing in a Churchyard"; 6. "Exeunt Omnes"	-
3	English Pastorals and Elegies; No. 1 – A Severn Rhapsody; No. 2 – Requiem da camera	1923 (A Severn Rhapsody)	-	A Severn Rhapsody is a brief orchestral work; Four-movement Requiem da camera scored for baritone soloist, chorus (or SATB solo voices) and orchestra; movements: 1. "Prelude"; 2. "From 'August 1914'" (setting of John Masefield poem); 3. "In the time of the breaking of nations" (Setting of Thomas Hardy poem); 4. "Lament" (Setting of Gibson poem)	-
4	Psalms for unaccompanied SATB	-	-	Scored for a cappella mixed SATB choir	-
5	Three Short Elegies	1926	-	Setting for unaccompanied chorus of three texts by Scottish poet William Drummond: 1. "Life a right shadow is"; 2. "This world a hunting is"; 3. "This life, which seems so fair"	-
6	Introit	mid-1920s	May 1927; 1928	written originally as the second movement of a completed violin concerto for Sybil Eaton, a gifted violinist with whom Finzi was infatuated; entire concerto published posthumously; second and third movements of concerto premiered May 1927 under Malcolm Sargent with Eaton as soloist; completed concerto premiered in 1928 in London under Ralph Vaughan Williams. Finzi was not satisfied with it and withdrew the first and third movements.	-
7	Nocturne (New Year Music) for Orchestra in C-Sharp Minor	1926, rev. 1940's	-	-	-
8	Dies natalis (cantata for strings and solo voice)	mid-1920's, 1938–1939	Wigmore Hall, January 1940	Scored for soprano or tenor soloist and string orchestra; Setting of four texts from metaphysical poet and theologian Thomas Traherne (1636/37–1674); Movements: 1. "Intrada" (strings only); 2. "Rhapsody" (Recitativo Stromentato); 3. "The Rapture" (Danza); 4. "Wonder" (Arioso); 5. "The Salutation" (Aria)	
9	Farewell to Arms (Introduction and Aria for tenor voice and small orchestra)	1944	-	-	-
10	Eclogue for piano and strings	-	-	Work intended as a piano concerto that remained unfinished; named posthumously by publisher	-
11	Romance for String Orchestra	1928	-	-	-
12	Two Sonnets by John Milton or Two Milton Sonnets; No. 1 "When I consider how my life is spent" No. 2 "How soon hath Time"	1928	-	-	-
13a	To a Poet	-	-	Six songs scored for "low voice" and piano; 1. "To a Poet a thousand years hence"; 2. "On parent knees"; 3. "Intrada"; 4. "The Birthnight"; 5. "June on Castle Hill"; 6. "Ode on the rejection of Saint Cecilia"	-
13b	Oh Fair to See	-	-	Seven songs for "high voice" and piano; 1. "I say I'll Seek Her"; 2. "Oh fair to see"; 3. "As I lay in the early sun"; 4. "Only the wanderer"; 5. "To Joy"; 6. "Harvest"; 7. "Since we loved"	-
14	A Young Man’s Exhortation	-	-	Ten songs, scored for tenor and piano; Song cycle of poems by English poet Thomas Hardy; Songs: Part I – 1. ‘A Young Man’s Exhortation’, 2. ‘Ditty’, 3. ‘Budmouth Dears’, 4. ‘Her Temple’, 5. ‘The Comet at Yelham’; Part II – 6. ‘Shortening Days’, 7. ‘The Sigh’, 8. ‘Former Beauties’, 9. ‘Transformations’ 10. ‘The Dance Continued’	-
15	Earth and Air and Rain			Scored for baritone soloist and piano; Song cycle of ten songs from poems by English poet Thomas Hardy; Songs: 1. ‘Summer Schemes’, 2. ‘When I set out for Lyonnesse’, 3. ‘Waiting Both’, 4. ‘The Phantom’, 5. ‘So I have fared’, 6. ‘Rollicum-rorum’, 7. ‘To Lizbie Browne’, 8. ‘The Clock of the Years’, 9. ‘In a Churchyard’, 10. ‘Proud Songsters’	-
16	Before and After Summer	-	-	Ten songs for baritone and piano, with words by Thomas Hardy; songs:1. ‘Childhood among the ferns’ 2. ‘Before and after summer’, 3. ‘The Self-Unseeing’, 4. ‘Overlooking the River’, 5. ‘Channel Firing’, 6. ‘In the Mind's Eye’, 7. ‘The Too Short Time’, 8. ‘Epeisodia’, 9. ‘Amabel’, 10. ‘He abjures love’	-
17	Seven Partsongs – Poems by Robert Bridges; No. 1: "I praise the tender flower" No. 2: "I have loved flowers that fade" No. 3: "My spirit sang all day" No. 4: "Clear and gentle stream" No. 5: "Nightingales"; No. 6: "Haste on, my joys!" No. 7: "Wherefore tonight so full of care	-	-	For SATB chorus	-
18	Let Us Garlands Bring; 1. "Come away death" 2. "Who is Silvia?"; 3. "Fear no more the heat o’ the Sun"; 4. "Oh mistress mine" 5. "It was a lover and his lass"	1942	-	Settings of songs from the plays of William Shakespeare	-
19a	Till Earth Outwears	1927-1956	-	Seven songs for high voice and piano, with words by Thomas Hardy; songs: 1. ‘Let me enjoy the earth’, 2. ‘In years defaced’, 3. ‘The Market-Girl’, 4. ‘I look into my glass’, 5. ‘It never looks like summer here’, 6. ‘At a Lunar Eclipse’, 7. ‘Life laughs onward’	-
19b	I Said to Love	-	-	Six songs for baritone and piano, with words by Thomas Hardy; song: 1. ‘I need not go’, 2. ‘At Middle-field Gate in February’, 3. ‘Two Lips’, 4. ‘In five-score summers’, 5. ‘For life I had never cared greatly’, 6. ‘I said to Love’	-
20	The Fall of the Leaf – Elegy for Orchestra	-	-	Op. posth.	-
21	Interlude for Oboe and String Quartet	1933–1936	-	Scored for Oboe, 2 violins, viola, cello; Finzi dedicated the work to British oboist Léon Goossens (1897–1988); Finzi also made a version for oboe and string orchestra, adding a double bass part	-
22	Elegy	-	-	For violin and piano	-
23	Five Bagatelles for Clarinet and Piano	-	-	Scored for clarinet and piano; An arrangement orchestrated by Lawrence Ashmore is catalogued as Op. 23a.; Movements: 1. ‘Prelude’, 2. ‘Romance’, 3. ‘Carol’, 4. ‘Forlana’, 5. ‘Fughetta’	-
24	Prelude and Fugue	-	-	Scored for string trio	-
25	Prelude for strings	-	-	-	-
26	"Lo, the full, final sacrifice"	1946	21 September 1946—St Matthew's Day	Scored for mixed SATB choir and organ; Festival anthem commissioned by Walter Hussey for the 53rd anniversary of the consecration of St Matthew's Church, Northampton; Orchestrated by Finzi for 1947 Three Choirs Festival	-
27	Three Anthems; No. 1: "My lovely one" No. 2: "God is gone up" No. 3: "Welcome sweet and sacred feast"	1946; 1951; 1953	-	For SATB chorus and organ; 1. Setting of a text by Edward Taylor, 1646?-1729; 2. Setting of a text by Edward Taylor, 1646?-1729; 3. Setting of The Holy Communion by Henry Vaughan, 1622-1695	-
28a	Love’s Labour’s Lost (songs)	1946	-	Four songs to accompany Shakespeare's comedy; 1. "When daisies pied" (Song of Ver); 2. "When icicles hang by the wall" (Song of Hiems); 3. "If she be made of white or red"; 4. "Is it not sure a deadly pain" (False Concolinel – anon.)	-
28b	Love’s Labour’s Lost (suite)	1946	-	Ten movement suite scored "for small orchestra" arranged from the incidental music of Op. 28a; Movements: 1. Introduction; 2. Moth; 3. Nocturne; 4. The Hunt; 5. Dance; 6. Quodlibet; 7. Soliloquy I; 8. Soliloquy II; 9. Soliloquy III; 10. Finale	-
29	Intimations of Immortality	late 1930s, completed 1950	1950 Three Choirs Festival, conducted by Herbert Sumsion	Scored for tenor soloist, chorus, and orchestra; Setting of nine of the eleven stanzas of William Wordsworth's 1804 poem "Ode: Intimations of Immortality"	-
30	For St Cecilia	1947	On 22 November 1947 at the Royal Albert Hall by René Soames with the Luton Choral Society and the BBC Symphony Orchestra conducted by Sir Adrian Boult	For tenor, chorus and orchestra; Setting of a work by English poet and author Edmund Blunden; Commissioned by the St Cecilia’s Day Festival Committee for the 1947 celebration of music’s patron saint	-
31	Clarinet Concerto	1949	-	-	-
32	Thou didst delight my eyes	-	-	Setting of a poem by Robert Bridges for three-part choir (TTB)	
33	All this night	-	-	An unaccompanied choral motet	-
34	Muses and Graces	-	-	A unison song with strings	-
35	Let us now praise famous men	-	-	Scoring: Two-part choral song with strings and piano	-
36	Magnificat	-	-	-	-
37	White-flowering days	1953	1 June 1953	Setting, for a cappella chorus, of a poem by Edmund Blunden; Work was Finzi’s contribution to A Garland for the Queen, a collection of part songs by English composers celebrating the coronation of Elizabeth II	-
38	Grand Fantasia and Toccata	-	-	For piano and orchestra; Thought to be intended as an unfinished piano concerto, named posthumously by publisher	-
39	In terra pax	-	-	A "Christmas Scene" scored for soprano and baritone soloists, chorus, strings, harp and cymbal; Setting of texts from English poet Robert Bridges and the Gospel of Luke	-
40	Cello Concerto in A minor	1955	19 July 1955 at the Cheltenham Music Festival, conducted by John Barbirolli, Hallé Orchestra, and cellist Christopher Bunting	Scored for cello soloist and orchestra; Work is in three movements: I. Allegro moderato, II. Andante quieto, III. Rondo: Adagio—Allegro giocoso	-
Posth.	Violin Concerto (Concerto for Small Orchestra and Violin)	-	1928	Withdrawn concerto from which Introit Op. 6, emerged as a stand-alone piece; published posthumously	-
