= World Record Club =

Former mail-order record company

Early 10" jazz title World Record Club disc in original universal printed fablothene sleeve.

The World Record Club Ltd. was a company in the United Kingdom that issued long-playing records and reel-to-reel tapes, mainly of classical music and jazz— through a membership-based mail-order system during the 1950s and 1960s.

In addition to releasing titles licensed from recording companies such as Everest Records and Westminster Records, which it obtained through franchise, it produced a series of recordings featuring international artists, using its own engineering staff. Although these recordings were often of significant musical interest and of acceptable technical quality, they did not appear in shop catalogues of the times, as they were not distributed through conventional record shops.

The label was acquired by EMI in 1965 but continued to operate as a sub-label for mail–order, covering a wide range of musical genres and distributing in market such as South Africa, Australia and New Zealand.

== Early days, c. 1955-1965 ==
The earliest card covers were interchangeable with stick-on titles.

World Record Club issues were in production by mid-1956. The World Record Treasures records were promoted as a series from which 'members' (membership was free) were required to purchase a set number of records annually. These recording were sold at lower prices than standard retail (21s 6d, equivalent to £1.07 1/2) and were initially distributed in inexpensive wrappers (originally logo-printed Fablothene, and then card covers with stickers naming the selection). A monthly Club magazine (Record Review) was launched in late 1956 to feature existing artists and recordings, to announce upcoming releases. The company was original based at 125 Edgware Road, London, with a display centre located at 49 Edgware Road. Its main UK rival in similar business was the Concert Hall label.

Membership was encouraged by such methods as using sleeve designs contributed by members and as these improved they obtained photographic services of Erich Auerbach. By 1958 there was a membership of at least 150,000. In the Promenade Concerts season of July to September 1958, World Records had a full-page advertisement (offering monthly releases at between 22s 6d and 24s 9d per disc, only one needing to be chosen per year) on the inside front cover of all the individual concert programmes, facing the actual music listing for the evening – a competitive space, placing it on equal footing with Electric Audio Reproducers, EMI Records, Decca Records, Grundig Tape Recorders, Ferguson Radiograms. A full-priced record then cost around 40 shillings (£2).

Key artists at the start were conductors Hans Swarowsky and Muir Mathieson, often with the Sinfonia of London, or Viennese orchestras. The development of new recordings was a special interest, under the celebrated recording engineer Anthony C. Griffith (1915–2005), who became recording manager for WRC in 1958. The Brahms violin concerto (Endre Wolf, violin, Sir Anthony Collins, conductor, WRC TP30) was a 1958 landmark for them, as technical details were published on the sleeve, recorded both in stereo and mono using Ampex equipment and Neumann microphones. Griffith made recordings of Colin Davis, Leon Goossens, Arthur Bliss, Reginald Jacques, Imogen Holst, the Melos Ensemble and Aeolian Quartet. WRC had the distinction of producing Colin Davis' first recording, conducting the Sinfonia of London in performances of Mozart's Symphonies 29 and 39 (TZ 130).

The Mozart oboe concerto (Leon Goossens, oboe; Colin Davis, conductor, T59), issued c.1961, was a big technical and artistic success, the sleeve featuring photographs of studio sessions and playbacks. The Label also produced a strong hand in English music, especially in Vaughan Williams' 9th Symphony and Greensleeves and Thomas Tallis Fantasias, and in music by Elgar, conducted by Adrian Boult and George Weldon, and in works of Sir Arthur Bliss. Important solo records of Sviatoslav Richter, Jorge Bolet and Shura Cherkassky were produced, and classical singers were not neglected.

By 1958 the company's business address had changed to Parkbridge House, Little Green, Richmond, Surrey, where it remained thereafter. The 'Treasures' terminology was soon dropped, so that the title 'World Record Club' became the main label feature, written on ribbons wrapped about a globe. The WRC catalogue numbers were prefixed by the letter T (and sometimes ST to denote a stereo version, using the same number, and also TP), and ran from 1 to about 50 by 1962, to 500 by 1966 (and continued) to well over T1000. These were in red or green labels, with silver overprinting, and there was a later form in which the label edge was printed with many short radial lines so that the correct speed could be obtained by stroboscopic 'standstill' effect. There was also an OH series, with purple labels, for the WRC Opera Highlights series, often taken from interesting recordings or specially-made abridgements, and again presented in a uniform sleeve. From 1960 various recordings of musicals were made, and also three Gilbert and Sullivan operas, recorded for copyright reasons in Hamburg in 1961 ahead of the ending of copyright in the works.

By this time the World Record Club was also releasing pre-recorded spool tapes of their LPs. These were mainly produced in mono half-track at 3 3/4 ips. The quality of the tapes was very high and the price reasonable. They appealed to enthusiasts who had tape recorders for making their own recordings, because at that time broadcast sound quality (for off-air recordings) was not very high. These tapes were released with the prefix TT. Although in mono, they are half-track, which gives a very high and gratifying signal-to-noise ratio. A number of 7 1/2 ips half track stereo tapes were also released under the WRC label, in plain white boxes with a historical sculpture in orange on the front. At least 8 were produced, one of which is of Scheherezade with Eugene Goossens.

=== Recorded Music Circle ===
The Recorded Music Circle label carried best quality classical issues.

About the start of 1959, a series devoted mainly to chamber music was created, under a new logo with an eagle in a circle, with 'R.M.C.' above it and 'World Record Club. Recorded Music Circle' beneath. The labels were attractively printed in light blue, showing a classical scene of two musicians wearing togas beside a stone column or altar, with the text details overprinted in red. The sleevenotes of the RMC were also printed in red, and after some experiments with a more ornamental sleeve, a uniform style of red lettering on a background of simulated wood-grain became the uniform sleeve design.

Once again the series mixed in-house and franchised recordings. It included 'strong' material such as Ralph Kirkpatrick playing the Mozart K570 sonata (CM30); Rudolf Schwarz conducting Mahler's 5th Symphony (LSO - CM 39–40, Everest); Pierre Monteux conducting Berlioz's Romeo and Juliet (CM 57–58, Westminster); Robert Gerle (violin) and Robert Zeller with the Frederick Delius and Samuel Barber violin concerti (CM 59, Westminster), Hermann Scherchen's Mahler 7th Symphony (CM 63–64, Westminster), the Bruckner 8th of Hans Knappertsbusch (CM 71–72, Westminster), and the Richard Strauss memorial album with Clemens Krauss and Kurt List (CM 73–74, Amadeo). This small but very interesting series had not reached 100 records by 1966. The pressings and presentation of this series was always good, usually with sleeve-notes by Malcolm Rayment, Stephen Dodgson or Peter Gammond (now author of numerous musical books). One very famous recording that was released on WRC before any other label was the Finzi Dies natalis with Wilfred Brown.

== EMI take control, 1965 ==
From about 1965, when World Record Club was bought by EMI, the label lost its characteristic green or red design and acquired a completely new look, minimalist, with blocks of grey. An important early enterprise under the new management was the complete cycle of Beethoven piano concerti with Emil Gilels (piano) and George Szell (conductor). Anthony C. Griffith remained with the company under the new ownership, and, since there were fewer new recording projects, he and Gadsby Toni began to explore and transfer to LP parts of the historical archives of EMI, producing some of the finest transfers ever achieved. In 1971 he joined the EMI International Classical Division to work on Karajan recordings, but also expanded his work on historical transfers.

=== Retrospect series ===
It was during the mid to late 1970s that the Retrospect series came to prominence under the WRC label. These records were dedicated to re-issues of material mostly from 78 rpm records, mainly old Columbia and His Master's Voice material from the 1920s to 1940s. There were several major projects, including the reissue of the early Thomas Beecham Delius Society recordings, and welcome returns such as the Albert Sammons/Henry Wood Elgar concerto recording of 1929, or the Gerhard Hüsch lieder recordings. However, the series was wide-ranging and included a large amount of show music and dance music of the 1920s and 1930s.

The record labels were a distinctive pale green with a lettered ribbon surround, and the prefix was SH. The technical quality of these transfers reflected a desire to preserve the tonal qualities of the originals even if it meant keeping a certain amount of surface noise (though at His Master's Voice, Len Petts and others were assiduous in finding masters and producing vinyl pressings for dubbing).

The advent of digital recording in the 1980s, and the wane of the 1970s Art Deco revival, turned attention away from the Retrospect series, the sleeves of which were deliberately given some 'Deco' styling. At this time, for instance in the transfers of Alfred Cortot's Chopin (e.g. SH 326, 327), the original WRC recording manager Anthony Griffith was still bringing his expertise to the high-quality transfers. He retired in 1979, but continued to act as consultant, notably for the CD transfers of the Elgar Edition.

== Australian World Record Club ==
The World Record Club had a special franchise in Australia, and operated from 1957 to 1976. The registered office was in Hartwell, a suburb of Melbourne, Victoria, with the postal address being P.O. Box 76, Burwood. Stores were provided in central Melbourne, Sydney, Brisbane, Adelaide and Perth, where records could be auditioned and picked up. Subsidiary clubs under its control in the early years were the Light Music Club and the Record Society, but both were later absorbed into the WRC itself.

Each year a selection of LPs would be made available, and subscribers needed to order them in advance. A catalogue listed the proposed records with descriptions, initially one per month but soon increasing to four and by 1970 to eight or more, for the forthcoming six months or year. Supplementary catalogues also appeared, listing additional releases to widen the repertoire. One of these was the Connoisseur Series, which made available classic performances from the past. Others were The Basic Library series and All-time Best Sellers (which enabled new members to fill gaps in their collections), The Living Bible narrated by Sir Laurence Olivier, and 24 Great Plays of Shakespeare.

Subscribers would send in their order forms and, as the records became available, they would be mailed out or could be picked up at the metropolitan outlets. Most of the selections were from the catalogues of companies in the EMI or Decca groups. Whereas some were re-issues, for example the Decca Der Ring des Nibelungen 19-LP set, many were issued in Australia exclusively by the WRC.

The club also recorded local artists, bands and orchestras, particularly in light music or shows such as "The Maid of the Mountains". One of their more unusual releases was "15 Australian Christmas Carols" by William G. James. For this they used the Sydney Symphony Orchestra and the New South Wales State Conservatorium Choir, conducted by Sir Bernard Heinze.

In 1963, WRC records sold for 35 shillings (Aus$3.50) or 37 shillings and sixpence (Aus$3.75) if posted. Equivalent discs in commercial record stores sold for 57 shillings and sixpence ($5.75). By 1970 the price per disc had actually fallen slightly to $3.39, plus 30 cents packing and postage. These prices were made possible by the policy of pre-ordering – the club had only sufficient records pressed to cover the orders received, and so there was no overstock nor wastage. They were produced at the manufacturing plant of EMI (Australia) Ltd. in Sydney, although some esoteric discs were pressed elsewhere. An LP of sitar music was released in 1968 that was made in India. Some 7-inch discs for children were also produced.

Subscribers were encouraged to order multiple records per month, with bonus Dividend LPs being offered at a rate of one per three monthly pre-selections. Though the Dividend LPs were offered at a bargain price of only 15 shillings each (Aus$1.50), their quality was equivalent to that of the regular issues. Members who introduced a new subscriber to the club were rewarded with a free record, which they could select from a list of a dozen.

In the first five years the record labels were a plain aqua colour, with the WRC logo and text in black. Around the circumference was a stroboscopic pattern to assist in checking turntable speed. Later records had a mid blue-green label, with an 18th-century image of a military trumpeter or fanfare-player in livery, as a background design to the overprinted label text.

The album covers were often striking – innovative, colourful and modern, although some were criticised as being too drab. The WRC set up its own artistic studio at its offices at 330 Flinders Lane, Melbourne, and the sleeves are still regarded as a high point in Australian graphic design of the 1960s. They occasionally won awards, although some subscribers preferred more traditional record covers, and made their opinions known in the 'Viewpoint' page of the Club magazine. Many of the texts were written by James Murdoch.

In the early years, multi-disc opera sets were lavish productions, the records in each set being presented in a red leatherette case with a folded silk ribbon opening tab. The discs in their plastic sleeves were separated by heavy sheets of gold card, bound into the box. A full libretto of nearly A4 size was included. A golden metal medallion was set into the middle of the front cover of the case, adding a touch of luxury and quality.

By 1970, the club was making its musical offerings also available as tapes, either on reels or as 8-track cartridges. Subscribers ordering reels needed to specify the tape speed required – 3 3/4 inches per second or 7 1/2 inches per second. To promote the sale of cartridges, the Club ran a promotion whereby a member could purchase five 8-track cartridges of their choice plus a car stereo cartridge player for $98.50.

The Club at that stage was also selling mini hi-fi systems which ranged in price from $355 to $608. These were assembled for them in Australia by Bang and Olufsen, a Danish company. The quality components used included Labcraft turntables, B&O pick-up arms, B&O amplifiers and Beovox speakers.

Each month subscribers received a copy of the World Record News, a slim magazine which provided interesting articles on music, its history, composers, artists and records. It also contained additional information about the next month's releases, supplementary catalogues with order forms, and special promotions. Readers' technical queries about music reproduction were dealt with by Eric Cleburne in a regular column, "Sound Advice". Any possible perceptions that the cheap prices of the records meant a lower overall quality were dealt with in another regular column, "Don't quote us – quote the critics!" in which reviews of WRC releases from independent sources were reprinted.

The Editor-in-Chief of the magazine was a New Zealander, Harvey Blanks, who was responsible for most of the content. This was always of a very high standard, erudite, informative, enthusiastic and reliable. He wrote many articles on music and composers which appeared regularly in the Club magazine as a feature "The Golden Road" from mid-1963. These were later incorporated into his book "The Golden Road – a Record Collector's Guide to Music Appreciation" (Rigby, 1968). Mr Blanks, chief executive officer John Day and director of repertoire Alex Berry were responsible for which records were selected for release, and many Australians owe their enduring love of classical music to the astute recommendations of these three gentlemen. The selections were particularly perspicacious – many are still regarded nearly fifty years later as first-choice performances. A large number have been re-released on CD by the parent companies. Recordings of outstanding technical quality, as from the catalogue of Everest, were also released, if their artistic merit justified their inclusion in the programme.

== New Zealand World Record Club ==
The WRC operated in New Zealand between 1960 and the mid-1970s and provided a valuable service to music lovers in provincial towns, which lacked the record shops and selections available to collectors in the main centres. The Club took full-page advertisements in the New Zealand Listener magazine offering a choice of any three LPs for ten shillings to new members. Members received a magazine listing the upcoming monthly releases for that year, which had to be ordered in advance.

The magazine featured a classical music column "The Golden Road" by World Record Club editor-in-chief Harvey Blanks. This was published in book form in 1968 by Rigby in Australia and Angus and Robertson in the UK and was offered for sale through the magazine. Five years in the making, it remains a highly readable and informative handbook for classical music devotees.

The WRC had showrooms in Wellington (in Farish Street), in Christchurch (in Cashel Street) and Auckland (in Albert Street), with sound booths where it was possible to listen to LPs from the club's catalogue. LPs were pressed at a factory in Lower Hutt.

== Sources ==
- Publications and recordings of World Record Club Records, 1956-1965 (London, and Richmond, Surrey).
- Membership terms: World Record Treasures sleevenote (early matt card format), 1956–58.
- Record Review, Magazine of the World Record Club (Monthly parts, vol 1 1956–57, etc.).
- Advertisements detailing terms, artists and current releases, Concert Programmes, 64th Season of Henry Wood Promenade Concerts (Royal Albert Hall, London July–September 1958).
- "World Record News" (Australia) October 1962, page 36.
- "World Record News" (Australia) March 1963, page 2.
- "World Record News" (Australia) April/May 1970.
- "World Record Club News" (NZ) 1960–1970, "World Record Club Bulletin" (1970–1973). Held in National Library of New Zealand.
- Blanks, Harvey. Golden Road: A Record-Collector's Guide to Music Appreciation. London, Angus & Robertson, 1968. ISBN 0-207-95013-X
- Walker, Malcolm. 'Obituary: Anthony C. Griffith,' The Gramophone
