= Newbury String Players =

The Newbury String Players was an English string orchestra founded in 1940 by the composer Gerald Finzi, to give concerts at a period, during the Second World War, when there was little live music. The members were mostly amateur players, with a few professional players.

== History ==
From 1939 Finzi lived in Ashmansworth, a few miles from Newbury. He conducted the orchestra from its founding, returning regularly for rehearsals or concert after he was called up. It received an annual grant from the Arts Council.

The first concert was at the church in Enborne, Berkshire, and the orchestra continued to play in churches, halls and schools in the south of England. Finzi selected the music for concerts, which included his own music and neglected compositions of Ivor Gurney and of 18th-century composers William Boyce and Richard Mudge. A notable concert (May 1942, High Wycombe) was a performance of Finzi's Dies Natalis with tenor Wilfred Brown.

After Finzi's death in 1956 the orchestra was conducted by his son Christopher Finzi.

Ralph Vaughan Williams, wrote to The Times about Finzi after his death, "Finzi had a great sense of the social responsibilities of the artist. This led him, during the war, to found the Newbury String Players..." who "have continued ever since to bring good music to the small villages of the neighbourhood which otherwise would have been without any such artistic experience."
