= Jeffrey Buttle =

Canadian figure skater and choreographer (born 1982)

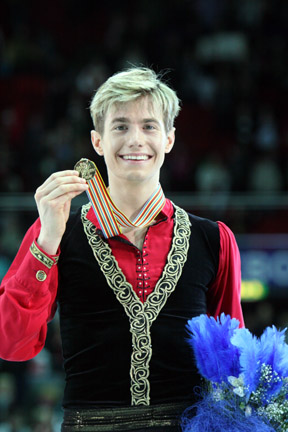
- Buttle on the podium at the 2008 World Championships

Personal information
- Born: September 1, 1982 (age 43) Smooth Rock Falls, Ontario, Canada
- Home town: Barrie, Ontario, Canada
- Height: 1.73 m (5 ft 8 in)

Figure skating career
- Country: Canada
- Discipline: Men's singles
- Retired: September 10, 2008
Event	Gold medal – first place	Silver medal – second place	Bronze medal – third place
Olympic Games	0	0	1
World Championships	1	1	0
Four Continents Championships	2	2	0
Grand Prix Final	0	2	0
Canadian Championships	3	2	2
Medal list
Olympic Games
Bronze medal – third place	2006 Turin	Singles
World Championships
Gold medal – first place	2008 Gothenburg	Singles
Silver medal – second place	2005 Moscow	Singles
Four Continents Championships
Gold medal – first place	2002 Jeonju	Singles
Gold medal – first place	2004 Hamilton	Singles
Silver medal – second place	2007 Colorado Springs	Singles
Silver medal – second place	2008 Goyang	Singles
Grand Prix Final
Silver medal – second place	2004–05 Beijing	Singles
Silver medal – second place	2005–06 Tokyo	Singles
Canadian Championships
Gold medal – first place	2005 London	Singles
Gold medal – first place	2006 Ottawa	Singles
Gold medal – first place	2007 Halifax	Singles
Silver medal – second place	2003 Saskatoon	Singles
Silver medal – second place	2008 Vancouver	Singles
Bronze medal – third place	2002 Hamilton	Singles
Bronze medal – third place	2004 Edmonton	Singles

Jeffrey Buttle (born September 1, 1982) is a Canadian figure skater and choreographer. He is the 2006 Winter Olympics bronze medalist, the 2008 World champion, the 2002 and 2004 Four Continents champion and the 2005–2007 Canadian champion. On March 22, 2008, Buttle became the first Canadian man since Elvis Stojko in 1997 to win the World Title. He announced his retirement from competitive skating on September 10, 2008.

== Personal life ==
Buttle was born in Smooth Rock Falls, Ontario, and raised in Sudbury. During his career, he lived in Barrie, Ontario.

He attended École Don Bosco, a French-language elementary school. While Buttle's family is not French-Canadian, Buttle attended French-language schools as a child and is bilingual in English and French. He studied chemical engineering at the University of Toronto part-time before taking time off to focus on his skating.

In 2012, Buttle played ice hockey for a team in the Toronto Gay Hockey Association.

Buttle is openly gay and married Justin Harris in February 2014. They divorced in early 2021.

== Career ==
Buttle began skating at age two and competing at age six. He did competitive ballet to improve his skating. Buttle also competed in ice dancing with his elder sister, Meghan. He trained at the Mariposa School of Skating in Barrie, Ontario.

=== Early career ===
Buttle won the silver medal in the junior level at the Canadian Championships in 1998. The next year, he placed in the top ten at his first senior nationals. He rose steadily through the ranks, gaining experience on the junior level. He made his senior international debut in the 2001–2002 season, making his mark immediately by winning the silver medal at the 2001 NHK Trophy behind Takeshi Honda. At the Canadian Championships, Buttle made his first run on the podium and placed third. It earned him a trip to Korea for the Four Continents, where he won his first gold medal.

Buttle's bronze medal finish at Nationals was not enough for him to be qualified as an alternate to the Canadian 2002 Olympic figure skating team. He hadn't met Canadian Olympic Association criteria. Silver medalist Emanuel Sandhu withdrew from the competition while Buttle could not replace him. Instead, Buttle went to the 2002 Worlds and placed high enough to earn Canada two spots to the next World Championships.

The next season, Buttle repeated his podium finish at Nationals, but was unable to defend his title at Four Continents. He worked to turn things around in the 2003–2004 season. He won his first Grand Prix gold medal at 2003 NHK Trophy, followed by his second silver, at 2003 Skate Canada. Buttle qualified for the Grand Prix Final, but was forced to withdraw. After that setback, he had a disappointing Nationals and did not earn a spot to Worlds. Buttle was instead sent to the Four Continents, which he won for the second time. Buttle spent that summer training in Lake Arrowhead with Rafael Arutyunyan, who would remain as his secondary coach with Lee Barkell. He recovered in the 2004–2005 season. He qualified for the Grand Prix Final a second time and won the silver medal. He went on to win his first National title. He finished the year with a silver medal at the 2005 Worlds.

=== Senior success ===
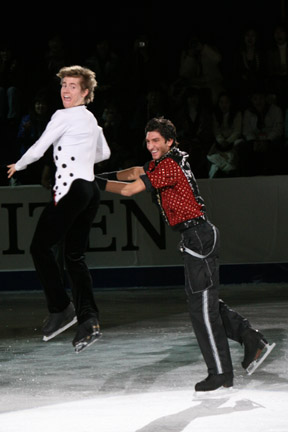
Buttle and Evan Lysacek perform a throw jump at the 2008 Four Continents exhibition gala.

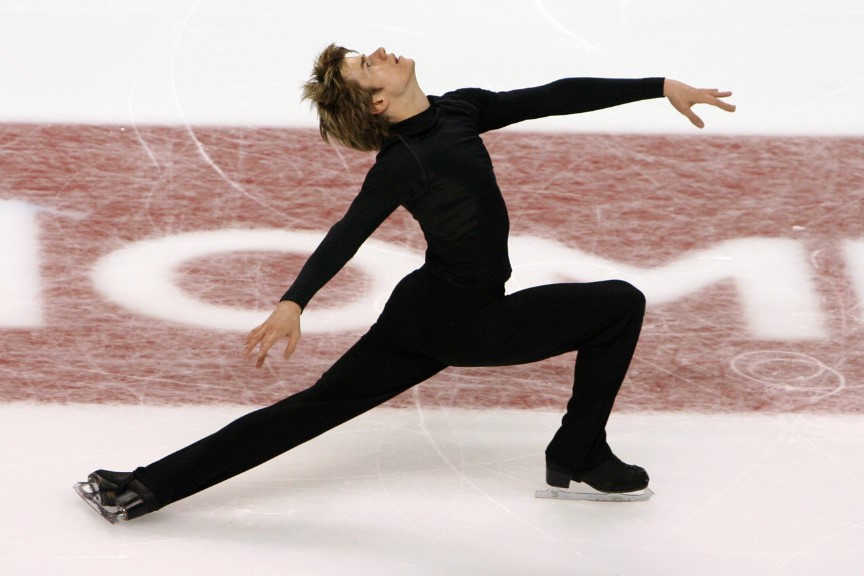
Buttle performs a lunge at the 2007 Skate Canada International.

In the 2005–2006 Olympics season, Buttle won the 2005 Trophée Eric Bompard and came in second at the 2005 Skate Canada. He had a wardrobe malfunction at Skate Canada when his pants split during his performance. With a gold and a silver medal, he qualified for the 2005–2006 Grand Prix Final and captured his second consecutive silver medal at that competition. He went on to win his second National title at the 2006 Canadian Championships and went into the Olympics as the reigning World silver medalist. While not a favorite to win, he was a favorite to medal.

At the Olympics, Buttle's short program left him in sixth place going into the free skate. Two days later, during the free skate, Buttle fell on his attempt at a quad toe jump and then put a hand down on the ice after a triple Axel jump, where he ended up losing to Evgeni Plushenko from Russia. In the free skate, he scored a personal best and place second in the segment, third overall, winning Canada's first bronze medal in men's figure skating since Toller Cranston in 1976. Buttle later said that he kept thinking of winning a medal in his short program but later focused on simply enjoying himself in the free skate program, and it paid off. Later, he mentioned taking a day off between the short program and the free skating helped him.

After the Olympics, Buttle went on to the 2006 Worlds, held in Calgary. He placed sixth.

Buttle withdrew from the 2006 Grand Prix series due to a stress fracture in his back. He began his season at the 2007 Canadian Championships, where he won his third consecutive national title. After Nationals, Buttle went on to the 2007 Four Continents in Colorado. He was the leader after the short program, and became the first male under the Code of Points system to gain level fours on all spins and footwork. A free skate in which he only did a double Axel jump without combination and a single on the second attempt left him with the silver medal, behind American Evan Lysacek.

Buttle then competed at the 2007 Worlds. In his second international competition of the season, Buttle was second after the short program with a new personal best. He placed eighth in the free skate, dropping down to sixth place overall. His placement, combined with that of Christopher Mabee, earned Canada two spots to the 2008 World Championships.

For the 2007–2008 season, Buttle started off slow, placing third and fourth at his two Grand Prix events. He decided to change his short program back to the one used during the previous season. At the 2008 Canadian Championships, despite taking the lead after the short program, he ended up losing his title to a rising star Patrick Chan. At the 2008 Four Continents, after a third-place finish in the short program, Buttle went on to place second in the long and consequently won the silver medal.

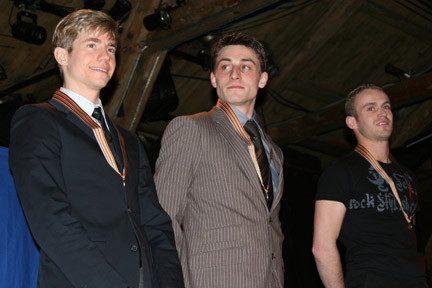
Buttle (left) during the awarding of the "ISU small medals" for the men's free skate during the 2008 World Championships closing banquet

At the 2008 Worlds, Buttle placed first in the short program. He then went on to deliver a personal best performance to win the gold medal by a 13.95 point margin over the defending world champion, France's Brian Joubert. Following his win at Worlds, Buttle appeared as a guest on many TV shows including CBC's Air Farce Live.

Assigned to the 2008 Skate Canada and 2008 Cup of China for the 2008–2009 season, Buttle prepared a new short program to "M.A.Y. in the Backyard" (Ryuichi Sakamoto) and a new free program to "Eclogue" (Gerald Finzi). However, he announced his retirement from competitive skating on September 10, 2008, saying that he had achieved his goals in skating, and competing was no longer in his heart. He represented the Sudbury Skating Club throughout his career.

Skate Canada published a Jeffrey Buttle Tribute Book on December 15, 2008. A second book about Buttle, Jeffrey Buttle Artist Book chapter TWO, was published in 2009 in Japan. Buttle served as the athlete representative on the Skate Canada Officials Advisory Committee.

Buttle acted as the Athlete Ambassador for the 2010 and 2011 Canadian Nationals. On November 15, 2012, Skate Canada announced he would be inducted into Skate Canada Hall of Fame in the athletic category. The induction ceremony was held during the 2016 Canadian Figure Skating Championships, where he performed a gala program, "Both Sides, Now".

=== Post-competitive career ===
Buttle has toured with Canadian Stars on Ice since his eligible days, and continues to skate in shows as a professional skater. He appeared in the 2009 US "Smuckers Stars on Ice" tour and has skated in several shows in China, Japan, Korea, and Europe. He has kept his technical level of skating by participating in pro-am competitions in Japan for many years.

In 2023, Buttle began working as a coach at the Granite Club, alongside his longtime coach, Lee Barkell. His students have included:

- (Canada) David Bondar
- (Canada) Alec Guinzbourg
- (South Korea) Kim Chae-yeon
- (Canada) Minsol Kwon
- (Canada) Megan Woodley

Additionally, Buttle works as a choreographer, another career path he started pursuing seriously after his retirement from amateur competition. He became interested in choreography after having watched David Wilson creating skating programs. Wilson has been the main choreographer of Buttle since 1999, and Buttle appreciated Wilson's passion for choreography. Buttle currently stays at Toronto Cricket, Skating and Curling Club as a choreographer. His past and current clients include:

- (United States) Max Aaron
- (United States) Jeremy Abbott
- (Canada) Fedor Andreev
- (Italy) Paul Bonifacio Parkinson
- (United States) Ryan Bradley
- (Czech Republic) Michal Březina
- (Canada) Patrick Chan
- (Canada) Alaine Chartrand
- (Japan) Mone Chiba
- (United States) Meryl Davis & Charlie White
- (United States) Meagan Duhamel & Eric Radford
- (South Africa) Michaela Du Toit
- (United States) Joshua Farris
- (Spain) Javier Fernández
- (Russia) Artur Gachinski
- (Japan) Yuzuru Hanyu
- (Japan) Wakaba Higuchi
- (United States) Tomoki Hiwatashi
- (Japan) Marin Honda
- (Canada) Ava Kemp & Yohnatan Elizarov
- (Japan) Rika Kihira
- (South Korea) Kim Chae-yeon
- (South Korea) Kim Ye-lim
- (South Korea) Yuna Kim
- (Finland) Kiira Korpi
- (South Korea) Kwak Min-jeong
- (South Korea) Kwon Min-sol
- (Canada) Amélie Lacoste
- (Spain) Sonia Lafuente
- (South Korea) Lee Jae-keun
- (South Korea) Lee June-hyoung
- (South Korea) Lim Eun-soo
- (South Korea) Lim Ju-heon
- (United States) Jimmy Ma
- (Japan) Mai Mihara
- (Japan) Satoko Miyahara
- (United States) Brandon Mroz
- (Japan) Takahito Mura
- (Japan) Daisuke Murakami
- (United States) Emilia Murdock
- (United States) Mirai Nagasu
- (Canada) Nam Nguyen
- (Japan) Nobunari Oda
- (Canada) Conrad Orzel
- (Canada) Kaetlyn Osmond
- (Canada) Alexandra Paul & Mitchell Islam
- (Canada) Joseph Phan
- (Italy) Ivan Righini
- (United States) Adam Rippon
- (Canada) Joannie Rochette
- (Japan) Kaori Sakamoto
- (Canada) Shawn Sawyer
- (Canada) Alison Schumacher
- (United States) Maia Shibutani & Alex Shibutani
- (South Korea) Shin Ji-a
- (China) Song Nan
- (Japan) Akiko Suzuki
- (Japan) Daisuke Takahashi
- (Canada) Jeremy Ten
- (Japan) Kazuki Tomono
- (Russia) Elizaveta Tuktamysheva
- (Canada) Tessa Virtue & Scott Moir
- (Russia) Sergei Voronov
- (United States) Ashley Wagner
- (United States) Angela Wang
- (South Korea) Wi Seo-yeong
- (South Korea) Yun Ah-sun
- (United States) Vincent Zhou
- (China) Zhu Yi

Also, he has choreographed ensemble numbers for Stars on Ice, Holiday Festival on Ice, The ICE, and Fantasy on Ice. He worked as part of the choreography team on the Canadian TV competition show Battle of the Blades, and was one of the choreographers for Intimissimi on Ice – OPERAPOP 2014.

Buttle became the director of Stars on Ice for the 2017 tour, in addition to his roles as a choreographer and a performer.

== Programs ==
=== Post-2016 ===
Season	Exhibition
2021–2022	In My Life by Lennon–McCartney, performed by Bette Midler; Black and Gold by Sam Sparro
2019–2020	Both Sides, Now by Joni Mitchell (2000 rendition); My End / Last Lap (from Combustion), by Carlos Jean; Point of Know Return by Steve Walsh, Robby Steinhardt, Phil Ehart, performed by John Elefante
2018–2019	Both Sides, Now by Joni Mitchell (2000 rendition); So Young (from Combustion), by Carlos Jean feat. Electric Nana; Eclogue for Piano and Strings by Gerald Finzi, choreo. by David Wilson; Better To Be Loved by Francesco Yates; For Forever by Benj Pasek, Justin Paul, performed by Ben Platt
2017–2018	Gotta Get Thru This by Daniel Bedingfield; For Forever by Benj Pasek, Justin Paul, performed by Ben Platt; Better To Be Loved by Francesco Yates; 泳动 performed by Sun Yang; Uptown Funk by Mark Ronson featuring Bruno Mars, choreo. by David Wilson, Chucky Klapow; Cry Me a River by Arthur Hamilton, covered by Michael Bublé; Alright by Darius Rucker, Frank Rogers; Love Me Tomorrow by Peter Cetera, David Foster
2016–2017	Isn't She Lovely by Stevie Wonder; Nothing Compares 2 U by Prince (musician), performed by Jimmy Scott; Better To Be Loved by Francesco Yates; Both Sides, Now by Joni Mitchell (2000 rendition); La prima volta by Ewan MacColl, performed by Paul Potts; Merry, Merry Christmas Everyone; Ordinary Love by Ben Rector; Yah Mo B There by James Ingram, Michael McDonald

=== 2009–2016 ===
Season	Free Skating Pro-am events	Exhibition
2015–2016	Cry Me a River by Arthur Hamilton covered by Michael Bublé	Fantasy by Maurice White, Verdine White, Eddie del Barrio performed by Norie Suzuki; Black and Gold by Sam Sparro; Cry Me a River by Arthur Hamilton covered by Michael Bublé; Both Sides, Now by Joni Mitchell (2000 rendition); What Are You Doing New Year's Eve?; Fooling Yourself by Styx
2014–2015	Here's to Life by Shirley Horn; Piano Concerto in F Sharp Minor, Op. 20 by Alexander Scriabin	Uptown Funk by Mark Ronson featuring Bruno Mars choreo. by David Wilson, Chucky Klapow; Here's to Life by Shirley Horn; O Holy Night
2013–2014	Liebestod by Richard Wagner	Counting Stars by One Republic; Liebestod by Richard Wagner; I'll Be Home for Christmas by Kim Gannon, Walter Kent, Buck Ram; The Glow-Worm (Mel Tormé version); He's So Unusual/Yeah Yeah covered/performed by Cyndi Lauper
2012–2013	Piano Concerto in F Sharp Minor, Op. 20 by Alexander Scriabin; In This Shirt by The Irrepressibles choreo. by Linda Garneau	In This Shirt by The Irrepressibles choreo. by Linda Garneau; Just in Time by Mel Tormé; O Holy Night
2011–2012	Naqoyqatsi by Philip Glass	Big Love by Fleetwood Mac; Both Sides, Now by Joni Mitchell (2000 rendition); Ave Maria by The Canadian Tenors
2010–2011	Tribute to Glenn Gould For the details, see the 2005–2006 program info.	Harder, Better, Faster, Stronger by Daft Punk; Enigma Variations: "Nimrod" by Edward Elgar; Enough is Enough performed by Donna Summer, Coco Gfeller choreo. by Jeffrey Buttle; Sunglasses at Night by Corey Hart performed by Gary Scott; Santa Claus Is Comin' to Town by J. Fred Coots, Haven Gillespie; Tribute to Glenn Gould For the details, see the 2005–2006 program info.
2009–2010	Eclogue for Piano and Strings by Gerald Finzi	Sympathy for the Devil by The Rolling Stones; Good Mother by Jann Arden covered by Jay Brannan; It's Beginning to Look a Lot Like Christmas by Meredith Willson performed by Harry Connick Jr.; Belle by The Canadian Tenors

=== Pre-2009 ===
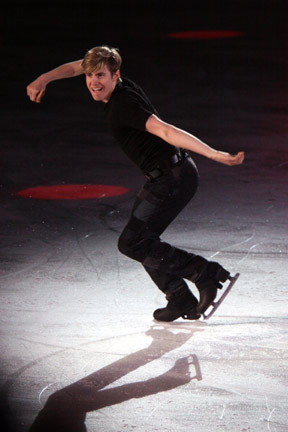
Buttle performs his exhibition Personal Jesus at the 2008 Canadian Stars on Ice in Halifax.

Season	Short program	Free skating	Exhibition
2008–2009			Eclogue for Piano and Strings by Gerald Finzi; Canned Heat by Jamiroquai; What Are You Doing New Year's Eve? by Frank Loesser performed by Harry Connick Jr.; Christmas Medley performed by Natalie MacMaster
2007–2008	Adiós Nonino by Astor Piazzolla performed by Pablo Ziegler; Pagliacci by Ruggero Leoncavallo	Ararat by Mychael Danna	Personal Jesus by Depeche Mode; Ribbon in the Sky by Stevie Wonder; Pagliacci by Ruggero Leoncavallo; Go the Distance by Michael Bolton; The Tracks of My Tears by Smokey Robinson, Pete Moore, Marv Tarplin covered by Boyz II Men; Should I Stay or Should I Go by The Clash
2006–2007	Adiós Nonino by Astor Piazzolla performed by Pablo Ziegler	Ararat by Mychael Danna	River by Joni Mitchell; High by James Blunt; Should I Stay or Should I Go by The Clash; Go the Distance by Michael Bolton
2005–2006	Sing, Sing, Sing by Louis Prima	Samson & Delilah by Camille Saint-Saëns; Tribute to Glenn Gould: Prelude from Tristan und Isolde by Richard Wagner; Leicht und Zart (from Six Little Pieces for Piano) by Arnold Schoenberg; Deux Morceaux – Caresse Dansée by Alexander Scriabin; Variation 16 performed by Glenn Gould; Prelude No. 2 in C minor (from Das Wohltemperierte Klavier) by Johann Sebastian Bach; Gigue from Suite for Piano by Arnold Schoenberg; Concerto in D minor after Alessandro Marcello by Johann Sebastian Bach	High by James Blunt; Sing, Sing, Sing by Louis Prima; Feeling Good by Michael Bublé; Fix You by Coldplay; I Love a Piano by Irving Berlin; Ave Maria performed by East Village Opera Company
2004–2005	Prelude in C Sharp Minor by Sergei Rachmaninoff	Naqoyqatsi by Philip Glass	Hurt by Johnny Cash; Ave Maria performed by East Village Opera Company; Sunglasses at Night by Corey Hart
2003–2004	Take Five by Paul Desmond	Samson and Delilah by Camille Saint-Saëns	Do Nothing till You Hear from Me performed by Robbie Williams; Angels by Robbie Williams; Lonely Christmas Eve by Ben Folds Five
2002–2003	Conspiracy Theory; Overture by Carter Burwell	Cello Concerto in E Minor by Edward Elgar	7 Days by Craig David; Angels by Robbie Williams; Lonely Christmas Eve by Ben Folds Five
2001–2002	The Last Emperor by Ryuichi Sakamoto	Gelsomina (from La Strada) by Nino Rota	Your Song by Elton John; Trouble by Coldplay
2000–2001	Tango Ballet; Concierto del Angel by Astor Piazzolla	Donna Juanita by Franz von Suppé; Symphonic Dances by Sergei Rachmaninoff; Aranjuez by Joaquín Rodrigo; Capriccio Espangol Op. 34: V Fandango Asturiano by Nikolai Rimsky-Korsakov	

== Competitive highlights ==
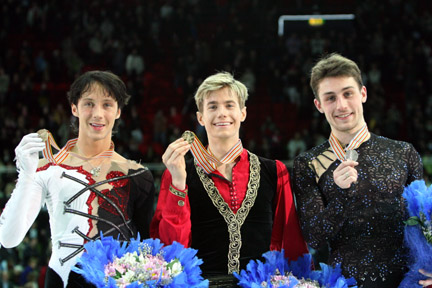
Buttle (center) with other medalists at the 2008 World Championships

- GP – Event of the ISU Grand Prix Series
- JGP – Event of the ISU Junior Grand Prix Series
- WD – Withdrew from competition
- Medals at team events are awarded for the team results only. Individual placements at team events are listed in parentheses.

Competition placements at senior level
Season	1998–99	1999–2000	2000–01	2001–02	2002–03	2003–04	2004–05	2005–06	2006–07	2007–08
Winter Olympics								3rd		
World Championships				8th	15th		2nd	6th	6th	1st
Four Continents Championships				1st	4th	1st			2nd	2nd
Grand Prix Final						WD	2nd	2nd		
Canadian Championships	10th	6th	9th	3rd	2nd	3rd	1st	1st	1st	2nd
GP Cup of China							1st			
GP Cup of Russia										4th
GP NHK Trophy				2nd	5th	1st				
GP Skate Canada					7th	2nd	3rd	2nd		3rd
GP Trophée Éric Bompard								1st		
Bofrost Cup						2nd				
Japan Open								2nd (3rd)	3rd (2nd)	
Karl Schäfer Memorial				3rd						
Nebelhorn Trophy			7th	2nd						

Competition placements at junior level
Season	1997–98	1998–99	1999–2000	2000–01
World Junior Championships				7th
Canadian Championships	2nd			
JGP China				4th
JGP Germany		6th		
JGP Japan			6th	
JGP Slovenia			4th	
JGP Ukraine				3rd
Mladost Trophy	1st			

Competition placements since the 2009–10 season
Season	2009–10	2010–11	2011–12	2012–13	2013–14	2014–15	2015–16
Japan Open	2nd (2nd)	2nd (6th)	1st (4th)	2nd (3rd)	2nd (5th)	2nd (5th)	
Medal Winners Open				1st		3rd	3rd

== Detailed results ==
ISU personal best scores in the +3/-3 GOE System
Segment	Type	Score	Event
Total	TSS	245.17	2008 World Championships
Short program	TSS	83.85	2008 Four Continents Championships
Short program	TES	45.85	2008 Four Continents Championships
Short program	PCS	38.03	2008 World Championships
Free skating	TSS	163.07	2008 World Championships
Free skating	TES	84.29	2008 World Championships
Free skating	PCS	81.00	2003 Skate Canada International
