= Joy Finzi =

British artist (1907–1991)

Joyce Amy Finzi (née Black; 3 March 1907 – 14 June 1991), commonly known as Joy Finzi, was a British artist and founder of the Finzi Trust, a foundation named for her husband, composer Gerald Finzi.

== Life and career ==
She was born Joyce Amy Black in Hampstead, London in 1907. She studied music and art, and married Finzi in 1933. They had two sons, Christopher and Nigel.

Together with her husband, Finzi played an important part in founding the Newbury String Players. She devoted much time to preserving the work of composer-poet Ivor Gurney, continuing her husband's work after his premature death in 1956. She sketched portraits of contemporary musicians including Ralph Vaughan Williams, Sir Adrian Boult, Howard Ferguson and Sir Arthur Bliss, and writers including Edmund Blunden, Ursula K. Le Guin, Sylvia Townsend Warner and David Jones.

In 1969, she founded the Finzi Trust to finance the recording of the work of her late husband Gerald (who had died in 1956), and other composers, and was instrumental in the formation of Finzi Friends in 1982, a society furthering the work of the Trust. She continued to draw and sculpt, and published two volumes of poetry: A Point of Departure and Twelve Months of a Year. A collection of her portrait drawings was published in 1987, with the title In That Place.

She died on 14 June 1991 in Ashmansworth, Hampshire at the age of 84.
