= Wilfred Brown (tenor) =

- Born: Wilfred Brown; 5 April 1921; Horsham, West Sussex UK
- Died: 5 March 1971 (age 49) Petersfield, England
- Occupation: Singer

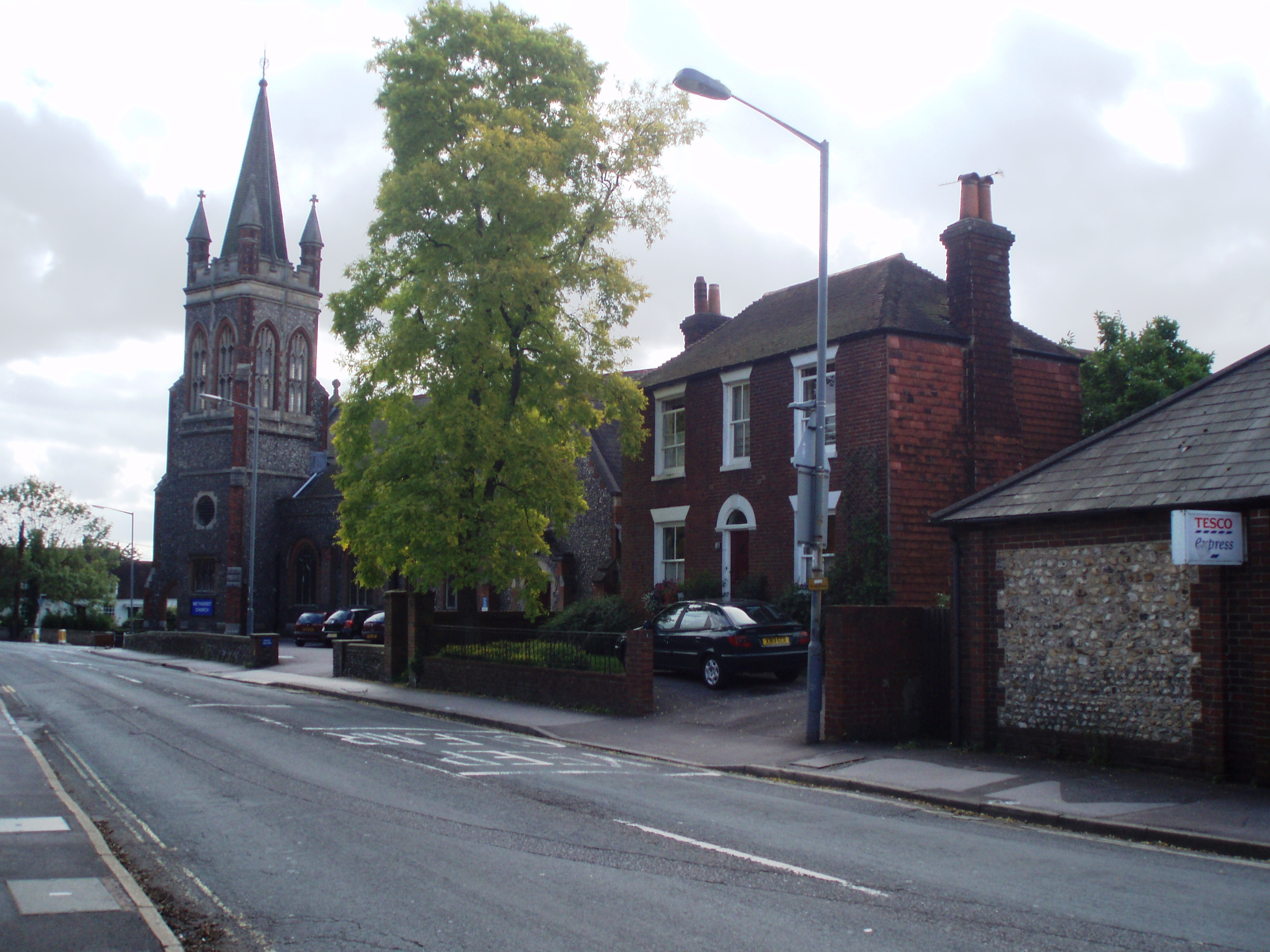
Brown's Petersfield home

Wilfred Brown (5 April 1921 – 5 March 1971) was an accomplished English tenor.

He was born in Horsham, Sussex and educated first at Collyer's School, then at Christ's Hospital School, Horsham before winning a scholarship in 1939 to Sidney Sussex College, Cambridge. Brown was a lifelong member of the Religious Society of Friends. After war-time service with the Friends Relief Service he returned to Cambridge and graduated in 1947. He then moved to University College School, Hampstead where he taught German and French. He left two years later to teach at Bedales School, where he was form master of amongst others Gerald Finzi's two sons before becoming a full-time singer in 1951. As well as his solo work, Brown was an ensemble singer with the Deller Consort.

Like fellow Petersfield resident Michael John Hurd, he championed the work of Gerald Finzi, who was a friend. He first sang Finzi's Dies natalis in 1952 under the composer's baton, and was to become Finzi's favoured soloist in several subsequent performances of the work. Brown also gave the first performance of Till Earth Outwears, a posthumous collection of Finzi's settings of poems by Thomas Hardy, in 1957 at Ashmansworth. In 1958, he was co-dedicatee and original performer with the oboist Janet Craxton of Ralph Vaughan Williams' song cycle Ten Blake Songs. In 1963 he recorded what is often cited as the definitive performance of Dies Natalis with the English Chamber Orchestra, under the direction of the composer's son, Christopher Finzi.

Other British composers advocated by Brown included Wallace Southam, W. Denis Browne, Peter Warlock, Ivor Gurney, Lennox Berkeley, George Butterworth and William Walton. He was also a great friend of the guitarist John Williams and together they recorded an album of music by Benjamin Britten, Stephen Dodgson and John Dowland (released in 1969 on Columbia Odyssey), and a collection of English folk songs.

Brown died in Petersfield from a brain tumour on 5 March 1971, aged 49. In his last recital, given at Highclere Castle in Hampshire, he had sung Dies Natalis.
