= Finzi Trust =

The Finzi Trust was founded in 1969 and seeks to further the music, ideals and work of Gerald Finzi. It has assisted individuals and organisations in a variety of ways and has initiated many projects reflecting the Trust's policy of encouraging young artists and composers.

Recording projects have included not only music by Finzi, but also by Michael Berkeley, Benjamin Britten, Howard Ferguson, Ivor Gurney, Herbert Howells, Kenneth Leighton, Malcolm Lipkin, Herbert Sumsion, Elizabeth Poston, William Walton and Percy Whitlock.

Other projects initiated by the Trust include performances, masterclasses and lectures in the US, weekends of English music in the UK, composition awards, song competitions, composer-in-residence schemes, commissions and re-publication of out-of-print scores. In 1997 the Trust commissioned Stephen Banfield to write the first full-length biography of Gerald Finzi.
