= Kate Kennedy (writer) =

British academic and writer (born 1977)

Dr Kate Kennedy FRHistS
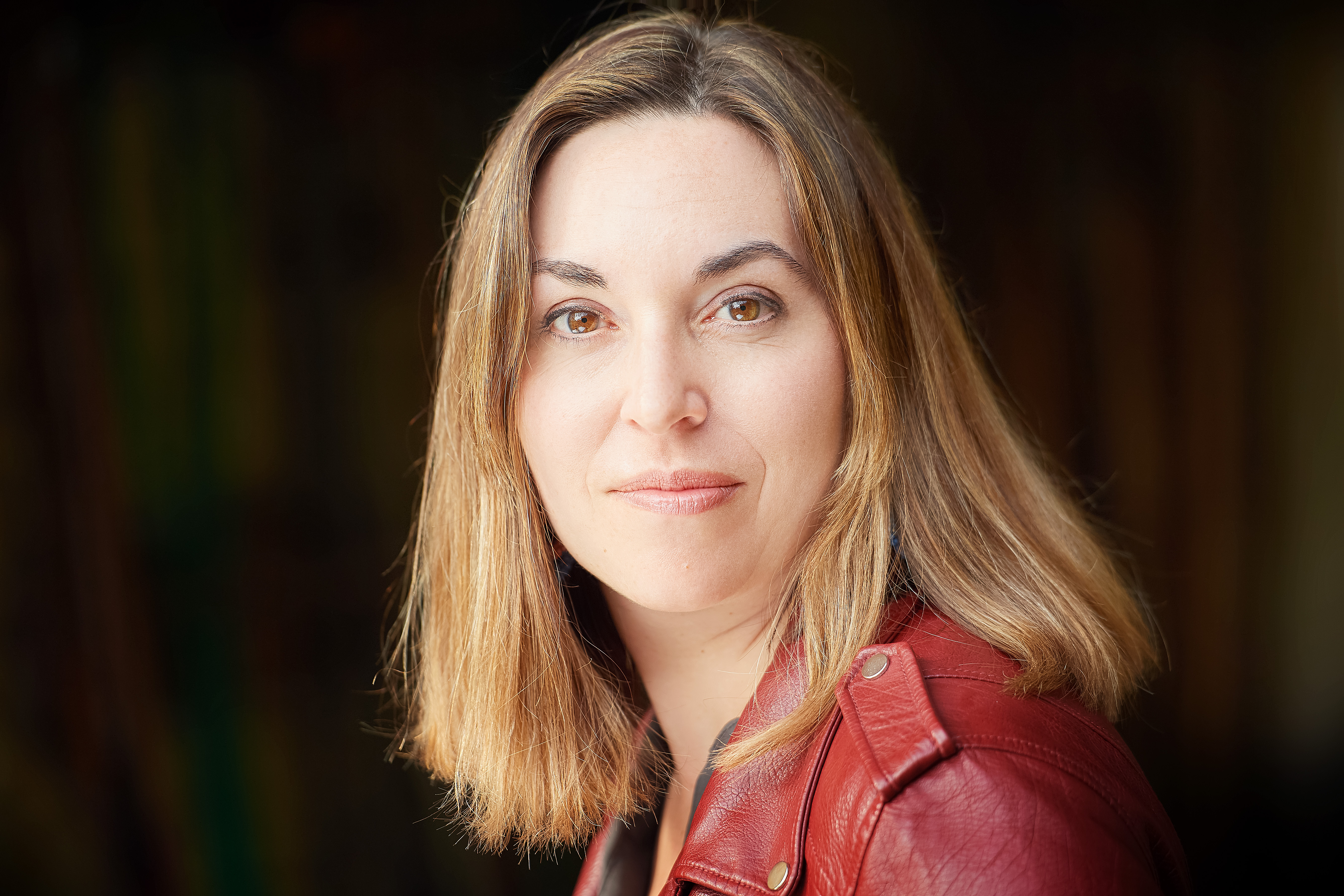
- Kennedy in 2019
- Born: 24 September 1977 (age 49); Bristol, England
- Education: Wells Cathedral School: St Catharine's College, Cambridge; Royal College of Music; King's College London; Clare Hall, Cambridge (PhD)
- Occupations: Biographer; academic; broadcaster
- Website: drkatekennedy.com

Kate Kennedy (born 24 September 1977) is a British biographer, academic and BBC broadcaster, who specialises in literature and music of the twentieth century. She is the Director of Oxford University's Centre for Life-Writing and Supernumerary Fellow at Wolfson College, Oxford. She is also Director of the Centre for the Study of Women Composers, Director of the Museum of Music History and a Fellow of the Royal Historical Society.

== Early life and education ==
Born in Bristol, Kennedy attended the specialist music school, Wells Cathedral School, where she studied as a cellist. In 1996, she commenced studying Music and then English at St Catharine's College, Cambridge. Despite a severe arm injury which affected her career as a cellist, in 2000 she was awarded a scholarship to the Royal College of Music, where she studied for a postgraduate diploma in advanced performance. She then completed a master's degree in twentieth-century literature at King's College London, and freelanced as a baroque cellist in London, helping to found the orchestra Southbank Sinfonia with its founder-conductor Simon Over, before returning to Cambridge in 2005 where she completed a PhD at Clare Hall on the World War I poet and composer Ivor Gurney.

== Career ==
Kennedy has lectured in Music and English at Girton College, Cambridge, where she received a Katharine Jex-Blake Research Fellowship as well as a Leverhulme Early Career Fellowship. In 2016, she became a member of the English Faculty at Oxford University, where she is the Director of the Oxford Centre for Life-Writing (founded by Hermione Lee in 2011) and Supernumerary Fellow at Wolfson College.

In 2021, Kennedy published Dweller in Shadows: A Life of Ivor Gurney by Princeton University Press. It was shortlisted for the Royal Philharmonic Society Prize and awarded the American Musicological Society Prize in 2024.

Her 2024 book, Cello: A Journey Through Silence to Sound, tells the story of cellists Amedeo Baldovino (1916–1998), Pál Hermann (1902–1944), Lise Cristiani (1827–1853), and Anita Lasker-Wallfisch (born 1925), and their cellos. It was shortlisted for the Royal Philharmonic Society's Storytelling Award 2025. The award recognises work that newly or distinctly furthered the understanding of classical music in the UK.

Kennedy is a regular broadcaster for the BBC, reviewing newly emerging classical music for Record Review on BBC Radio 3 and five-part series for The Essay also on BBC Radio 3.

== Selected bibliography ==
- Ivor Gurney: Poet, Composer (Ivor Gurney Society Journal Special Issue, 2007)
- The First World War: Literature, Music, Memory (Routledge, 2011)
- The Silent Morning: Culture, Memory and the Armistice 1918 (Manchester University Press, 2013), co-editor with Trudi Tate
- Literary Britten (Boydell and Brewer, 2018)
- The Fateful Voyage (play script, 2018), starring Alex Jennings
- Lives of Houses (Princeton University Press, 2020), co-editor with Hermione Lee)
- Dweller in Shadows: A Life of Ivor Gurney (Princeton University Press, 2021)
- Cello: A Journey Through Silence to Sound. Pegasus Books. December 2024. ISBN 9781639367504.
