= Emma Johnson (clarinettist) =

British clarinettist (born 1966)

Emma Johnson MBE
- Born: 20 May 1966 (age 60); Barnet, Hertfordshire, England
- Genre: Classical
- Instrument: Clarinet
- Years active: 1984–present
- Labels: ASV Records; Universal Classics and Jazz; Naxos Records; Nimbus Records
- Website: www.emmajohnson.co.uk

Emma Johnson MBE (born 20 May 1966) is a British clarinettist, who was appointed MBE for services to music in 1996.

In 1984, she won the BBC Young Musician of the Year competition, playing one of Crusell's clarinet concertos in the televised final, and won the Bronze Award representing Britain in the subsequent European Young Musician Competition. She also won the Young Concert Artists International Auditions in 1991 which led to her New York City recital debut at Carnegie Hall. She has become one of the UK's biggest selling classical artists, with over half a million discs sold worldwide.

== Career ==
Emma Johnson was born on 20 May 1966 in Barnet in Hertfordshire. She attended Newstead Wood School for Girls, Orpington and Sevenoaks School, learning the clarinet with John Brightwell. She joined the National Youth Orchestra of Great Britain at the age of 15. In 1984, she won the BBC Young Musician of the Year title, performing Crusell's Second Concerto with the BBC Philharmonic Orchestra under Bryden Thomson. She represented Britain at the European Young Musician Competition where she was awarded the Bronze Award. She made her London debut at the Barbican Hall, playing the Mozart Concerto with the English Chamber Orchestra on 10 February 1985. She chose not to go to music college, but in 1985 matriculated to Pembroke College, Cambridge, where she studied English, then Music. While there, she had clarinet lessons with Sidney Fell and Jack Brymer. During this period, she combined her studies with a burgeoning professional career, appearing regularly in concerts in Britain and abroad. By the time she was in her third year at university she had performed at all the principal concert halls in Britain and with most of the professional orchestras. She had also made many television appearances and signed an exclusive recording contract with ASV Records, for whom she recorded more than a dozen discs. Johnson also performed for the theme and soundtrack music for the 1987 BBC Series The Victorian Kitchen Garden. It won the 1991 Ivor Novello award for best TV theme music.

Emma Johnson is one of the few clarinettists to have established a busy career as a solo performer which has taken her to major European, American and Asian venues as well as to Africa and Australasia. Her recording of sonatas by Brahms and Mendelssohn with John Lenehan was described as "definitive...triumphant...a landmark disc" in The Observer and follows on from her classical chart-topping successes: Voyage and the Mozart Album on the Universal Label. Her recording of the Finzi Concerto was nominated for a Gramophone award and Pastoral was chosen as CD of the Year by BBC Music Magazine.

In 2016 Johnson became the first female alumna to have a portrait unveiled at Pembroke College, Cambridge, and was the first woman to be made an honorary fellow of the college in 1999.

In 2020 Emma Johnson was awarded the Cobbett Medal for services to chamber music by the Musicians' Company in the City of London.

Johnson is a published composer too and during lockdown she wrote a clarinet concerto, Tree of Life, inspired by a need to express something in music about the climate crisis. Its first performance with a handpicked team of like-minded musicians, the Orchestra for the Environment, was a triumph and has led to many more performances throughout the UK. Emma Johnson’s compositions and arrangements have been published by Chesters and Faber Music. Her composition for clarinet and choir, Songs of Celebration, was recently performed in Dublin, London and Tokyo and a series of new works have been published by Queen’s Temple Publishing.

== Discography ==
- 1985 Mozart Clarinet Concerto (with English Chamber Orchestra, conducted by Raymond Leppard) c/w Mozart Flute and Harp Concerto (William Bennett, flute, and Osian Ellis, harp) (ASV Records)
- 1986 Crusell Clarinet Concerto no. 2, Weber Clarinet Concertino, Baermann Adagio, Rossini Introduction Theme and Variations (with English Chamber Orchestra, conducted by Sir Charles Groves) (ASV Records)
- 1987 Weber Clarinet Concerto no. 1, Crusell Introduction Theme and Variations on a Swedish Air, Debussy Premiere Rhapsodie, Tartini/Jacob Concertino (with English Chamber Orchestra, conducted by Yan Pascal Tortelier) (ASV Records)
- 1988 La Clarinette Francaise (Recital of French music with Gordon Back, piano) (ASV Records)
- 1989 The Romantic Clarinet – Weber Clarinet Concerto no. 2, Spohr Clarinet Concerto no.1, Crusell Clarinet Concerto no. 3 (with English Chamber Orchestra, conducted by Gerard Schwarz) (ASV Records)
- 1990 Clarinet Celebration (Recital of German and Italian music with Gordon Back, piano) (ASV Records)
- 1991 Emma Johnson Plays Weber (Weber Concertos and Concertino from earlier recordings) (ASV Records)
- 1991 Crusell Clarinet Concerto no. 1, Kozeluch Clarinet Concerto, Krommer Clarinet Concerto (with Royal Philharmonic Orchestra, conducted by Gunther Herbig) (ASV Records)
- 1991 Emma Johnson Plays Crusell (Crusell Concertos from earlier recordings) (ASV Records)
- 1992 Encores (Recital disc with Julius Drake, piano, and Skaila Kanga, harp) (ASV Records)
- 1993 Finzi/Stanford (with Royal Philharmonic Orchestra, conducted by Sir Charles Groves, and with Malcolm Martineau (piano) (ASV Records)
- 1993 Michael Berkeley Concerto (with Northern Sinfonia, conducted by Sian Edwards) (ASV Records)
- 1994 Encores 2 (Recital disc with Julius Drake, piano) (ASV Records)
- 1994 Pastoral (Recital disc of English music with Malcolm Martineau, piano, and Judith Howarth, soprano) (ASV Records)
- 1995 Sir Malcolm Arnold – The Complete Works for Clarinet (with English Chamber Orchestra, conducted by Ivor Bolton) (ASV Records)
- 1999 The Essential Emma Johnson (compilation of earlier recordings) (ASV Records)
- 2000 Mozart and Weber Clarinet Quintets (with Emma Johnson and Friends) (ASV Records)
- 2004 Voyage (popular pieces with Royal Philharmonic Orchestra, conducted by Julian Reynolds, and John Lenehan, piano) (UCJ)
- 2005 The Mozart Album (Mozart Concerto and Quintet with the Royal Philharmonic Orchestra and the ConTempo Quartet) (UCJ)
- 2009 Copland/Bernstein/Dankworth (Recital disc with John Lenehan, piano) (Naxos)
- 2012 Brahms Sonatas (recital disc with John Lenehan, piano) (Nimbus)
- 2014 Brave New World (Prokofiev, Hindemith, Rota, Messiaen, Lutoslawski with John Lenehan piano) (Champs Hill Records)
- 2015 Brahms Clarinet Quintet, Zemlinsky Trio (with Michelangelo Quartet) (Nimbus)
- 2016 Schubert Octet (recorded live with Emma Johnson and Friends) (Somm)
- 2016 English Fantasy (premiere recordings of Concertos by Sir John Dankworth, Patrick Hawes, Paul Reade and Will Todd with BBC Concert Orchestra cond. Philip Ellis) (Nimbus Records)
- 2016 Clarinet Goes To Town (collection of light and jazz arrangements with John Lenehan, Paul Clarvis and the Carducci Quartet) (Nimbus Records)
- 2019 Beethoven Septet, Weber and Johann Strauss (recorded live with Emma Johnson and Friends) (https://www.somm-recordings.com/recording/emma-johnson-friends-2/)
- 2022 Songs of Celebration (Nimbus Records) https://www.wyastone.co.uk/emma-johnson-songs-of-celebration-the-pied-piper.html
