= Earth and Air and Rain =

1945 song cycle by Gerald Finzi

Earth and Air and Rain is a song cycle for baritone and piano by Gerald Finzi (1901–56). It was composed between 1928 and 1935, and published in 1936 as his Op. 15. It consists of settings of ten poems by Thomas Hardy (1840–1928).

It was premiered on 2 July 1945 at the National Gallery, London by Keith Falkner (baritone) and Howard Ferguson (piano).

A typical performance takes 30 minutes. The songs are:

1. "Summer Schemes"
2. "When I Set Out for Lyonnesse"
3. "Waiting Both"
4. "The Phantom"
5. "So I Have Fared"
6. "Rollicum-Rorum"
7. "To Lizbie Browne"
8. "The Clock of the Years"
9. "In a Churchyard"
10. "Proud Songsters"

The title of the cycle is taken from "Proud Songsters":

These are brand-new birds of twelve-months' growing,
Which a year ago, or less than twain,
No finches were, nor nightingales,
Nor thrushes,
But only particles of grain,
And earth, and air, and rain.

The music critic Stephen Banfield has written, "in some ways this is Finzi’s richest score". The cycle contains two of Finzi's best-known songs in "Rollicum-Rorum" (Note: Hardy's title for this poem was "The Sergeant's Song".) and "To Lizbie Browne"; which the composer himself described as "the two worst in the set" - "an opinion which says more about Finzi’s introvert character than his artistic judgement".
