= Sappho: One Hundred Lyrics =

1904 book by Bliss Carman

First edition of Sappho, 1904.

Sappho: One Hundred Lyrics is a book of poetry by Canadian poet Bliss Carman. It was first printed in 1904 in Boston by L.C. Page. Carman's cousin, and fellow Canadian poet, Charles G.D. Roberts wrote an introductory essay, "The Poetry of Sappho."

Sappho was an Ancient Greek poet from the island of Lesbos, who was included in the Greek canon of nine lyric poets. Most of her poetry, which was well-known and greatly admired throughout antiquity, has been lost, but her reputation has endured, supported by the surviving fragments of some of her poems.

Carman's method, as Roberts saw it, "apparently, has been to imagine each lost lyric as discovered, and then to translate it; for the indefinable flavor of the translation is maintained throughout, though accompanied by the fluidity and freedom of purely original work." It was a daunting task, as Roberts admits: "It is as if a sculptor of to-day were to set himself, with reverence, and trained craftsmanship, and studious familiarity with the spirit, technique, and atmosphere of his subject, to restore some statues of Polyclitus or Praxiteles of which he had but a broken arm, a foot, a knee, a finger upon which to build." Yet, on the whole, Carman succeeded.

"Written more or less contemporaneously with the love poems in Songs of the Sea Children, the Sappho reconstructions continue the amorous theme from a feminine point of view. Nevertheless, the feelings ascribed to Sappho are pure Carman in their sensitive and elegiac melancholy."

Sappho: One Hundred Lyrics has a structure and unity that helps make it what has been called Carman's "finest volume of poetry." Virtually all of the lyrics are of high quality; some often-quoted are XXIII ("I loved thee, Atthis, in the long ago,"), LIV ("How soon will all my lovely days be over"), LXXIV ("If death be good"), LXXXII ("Over the roofs the honey-coloured moon")

"Next to Low Tide on Grand Pré, Sappho: One Hundred Lyrics seems to be the collection that continues to find the most favour among Carman’s critics. D.M.R. Bentley, for example, calls it 'undoubtedly one of the most attractive, engaging and satisfying works of any of the Confederation poets.'"

Admirers of Carman's Sappho included insurance executive and future modernist poet Wallace Stevens. In January 1909, Stevens wrote to a friend:

At the library yesterday, I skipped through a half-dozen little volumes of poetry by Bliss Carman. I felt the need for poetry – of hearing again about April and frogs and marsh-noises and the "honey-colored moon" — of seeing "oleanders/Glimmer in the moonlight". You remember the fragments of Sappho. Carman has taken taken fragments and imagined the whole of the poem of which each was a part. The result, in some instances, is immensely pleasant – although distinctly not Sapphic. Sappho’s passion came from her heart. Carman’s from a sense of warm beauty.

Bentley argued that "the brief, crisp lyrics of the Sappho volume almost certainly contributed to the aesthetic and practice of Imagism."

In 1998 Richard Carder gathered together musical settings from Sappho by the composer and poet Ivor Gurney as Seven Sappho Songs. It was first performed as a collection on 29 October 1998 by Georgina Colwell (soprano) and Nigel Foster (piano) at the Blackheath Concert Halls in London, and published two years later. The seven songs are: "Soft Was The Wind", "I Shall Be Ever Maiden", "The Apple Orchard", "Hesperus", "Love Shakes My Soul", "The Quiet Mist" and "Lonely Night".
