= Black Stitchel =

Black Stitchel is the popular name of a conical hill, located in the parish of Hepple, Northumberland, in the region known as Bishop's Waltham Moors.

The hill inspired a poem by Wilfrid Wilson Gibson, published in his 1918 collection, Whin. It was set to music in 1920 by Gibson's friend Ivor Gurney and has become part of the baritone's concert repertoire The Listener said that, in this song, "Wilfrid Gibson's lines are given an exact counterpart of freedom and intimacy". It was one of several of Gibson's poems set by Gurney. The song has been recorded by Roderick Williams, Michael George and others. Another setting was composed by John Jeffreys for tenor and has been recorded by Ian Bostridge.
