= Christopher Bunting =

English cellist (1924–2005)

Christopher Bunting

Christopher Evelyn Bunting (8 August 1924 – 28 July 2005) was an English cellist. He had an international reputation, and was a highly regarded teacher; he gave first performances of notable cello concertos.

== Life ==
Bunting was born in London in 1924. His father was a civil engineer in India, and an amateur pianist; his mother, also an amateur musician, played cello and piano. He played the piano from age five, and the following year began playing the cello, studying with Ivor James.

He began an engineering course at Bristol University, but abandoned this and studied music at Cambridge University. Studies were interrupted by army service during the Second World War; he finally gained his music degree in 1947. At about this time he studied with Maurice Eisenberg, both in the US and during Eisenberg's visits to England.

In 1952 he gave a successful debut recital at the Wigmore Hall with pianist Gerald Moore, and soon afterwards travelled to take up a scholarship studying with Pablo Casals in Prades, Pyrénées-Orientales.

His own teaching was influenced by Casals's detailed analysis of music performed; Bunting came to be regarded as a demanding but inspirational teacher. He was an accomplished pianist, and often played sonatas with his students. For six years from 1963 he taught at the Yehudi Menuhin School. For many years he was professor of cello at the Royal College of Music.

In 1955 at the Cheltenham Music Festival, Bunting gave the first performance of Gerald Finzi's Cello Concerto; he had been involved in its composition. In 1967 he gave the first performance of Alan Rawsthorne's Cello Concerto, and he also gave the first British broadcast performance of Shostakovich's First Cello Concerto.

He acquired an international reputation. He gave duo recitals with pianists Yonty Solomon, Peter Wallfisch and others, and gave master classes. In 1991 he was elected president of the British branch of the European String Teachers' Association. He was appointed MBE in 2000.

From 1994 his performing career ended; he suffered from a spinal condition which was never satisfactorily diagnosed, and was in a wheelchair, but he continued to teach. Bunting died in 2005, aged 80.

He was married and divorced three times. He had a son, Mark, who predeceased him, and a daughter, Philippa.

== Compositions and writings ==
Compositions include a concerto for cello and strings, which he premiered in 1984, a fugue for six cellos, and Elegy for cello and piano. He wrote "A Portfolio of Cello Exercises", and in 1982 he wrote "Essay on the Craft of Cello Playing".
