= Christopher Finzi =

British orchestral conductor (1934–2019)

Christopher "Kiffer" Finzi (12 July 1934 — 28 November 2019) was a British orchestral conductor. He was the son of composer Gerald Finzi and artist Joy Finzi.

== Background ==
Born in Hampstead, London in 1934, Finzi was the elder of Gerald Finzi's two sons. Both he and his younger brother Nigel (1936–2010) attended Bedales School in Hampshire, where they were exposed to a liberal education and intellectual freedom much in line with their parents' own progressive outlook on the world. Finzi attended the Royal Academy of Music and embarked on a career as a freelance cellist. He became the conductor of the Newbury String Players after the death of his father who had founded the orchestra.

Like his father, the younger Finzi became a pacifist. As a conscientious objector he refused military service in 1955 and was briefly imprisoned before being allowed to do farm work. After his father's death in 1956, he helped his mother to establish the Finzi Trust and sustain Gerald Finzi's reputation. Their lifestyle was bohemian, living in a remote farmhouse.

== Marriage ==
Finzi married Hilary du Pré, a flautist, in 1961. They raised their four children, Theresa, Clare, Nicolette and Orlando, at Church Farm in Ashmansworth, Hampshire, the family home built by Finzi's parents. Du Pré's younger sister, the cellist Jacqueline du Pré, was part of their household during the 1970s.

Hilary du Pré's 1997 memoir, A Genius in the Family, written with her brother Piers du Pré, created controversy by asserting that Finzi had had an affair with his sister-in-law.

The 1998 film Hilary and Jackie, the plot of which was based on interviews with Hilary and Piers, told the same basic story and was also controversial.

== Later life ==
Finzi eventually turned his attention away from music to farming, establishing a poultry business at Ashmansworth. He and his wife operated a health food shop in Newbury, Berkshire.

He made several recordings in his capacity as a conductor, including a performance of Gerald Finzi's Dies Natalis and music by British composers Robin Milford and Edmund Rubbra. From 1971 to 1997, Finzi was resident conductor of the North Wiltshire Orchestra.

Finzi died in November 2019, aged 85.
