= Cello Concerto (Finzi) =

The Cello Concerto in A minor, Op. 40, was composed by Gerald Finzi in 1955.

The piece is in three movements:

1. Allegro moderato
2. Andante quieto
3. Rondo: Adagio - Allegro giocoso

The concerto was written as the result of a request by John Barbirolli, and first performed by Barbirolli and the Hallé Orchestra, with Christopher Bunting, as the soloist at the Cheltenham Music Festival on 19 July 1955. The first radio broadcast of the concerto was given on the night before Finzi died in 1956.

Part of the second movement was used as the signature tune for the BBC Radio 2003 of adaptation of C. P. Snow's Strangers and Brothers.
