= Clarinet Concerto (Finzi) =

Musical composition by Gerald Finzi

The Concerto for Clarinet and Strings in C Minor, Op. 31, is perhaps the best-known work by Gerald Finzi, an English composer of the Pastoral school. It was written in 1948–1949, first performed in 1949, and in recent years has been recorded many times. The concerto is in three movements, the first marked Allegro vigoroso, the second Adagio, ma senza rigore, and the third Rondo: Allegro giocoso.

== Composition ==
The concerto was written relatively quickly, by Finzi's standards, during 1948 and 1949. Having been commissioned by the Three Choirs Festival to write a work for string orchestra, he persuaded them to accept a concerto for clarinet and strings, and in October 1948 approached the clarinettist Frederick Thurston to be its soloist. Over the next few months Finzi frequently wrote to him for advice on the capabilities of the clarinet. He completed the concerto in time for the September 1949 festival, dedicating it to the clarinettist Pauline Juler, for whom he had originally intended to write such a concerto. A reduction for clarinet and piano also exists, arranged by Harold Perry.

== First performances ==
The first performance took place on 9 September 1949 in Hereford Cathedral, with the composer himself conducting Thurston and the string section of the London Symphony Orchestra. Finzi's friend Ralph Vaughan Williams, on hearing it, persuaded him to add a cadenza to the first movement. The concerto was played at the 1953 festival in Gloucester, Finzi again conducting though this time the soloist was Gervase de Peyer.

== Reception ==
Finzi's music was comparatively rarely performed for many years, but when interest in it revived during the 1970s the Clarinet Concerto was the first work of his to achieve popularity. It was taken up by the BBC Symphony Orchestra and other BBC orchestras, and was chosen by several clarinettists in the Young Musician of the Year competition. As of 2025 it has been played at the BBC Proms three times. The Clarinet Concerto has been called "Finzi's most widely performed and recorded orchestral work", and "arguably the composer's most universally popular work".

In recent years there has been much positive critical reaction to the concerto. Diana McVeagh praised "the fertility and gaiety of the thematic invention". Emma Johnson's opinion is that "by writing the Clarinet Concerto [Finzi] gave future generations a precious gift". Ivan March and Andrew Achenbach both called it "gorgeous", March adding that it "ought to be as familiar in the concert hall as the Mozart". Other critics have referred to it as "marvelous" and "loveable", "one of Finzi's loveliest and most characteristic works", and "an enduring masterpiece".

== Recordings ==
The Clarinet Concerto was first recorded in 1977 on the Lyrita label by the clarinettist John Denman and the New Philharmonia Orchestra under Vernon Handley. Later soloists to have committed it to CD include Thea King, Alan Hacker, Richard Stoltzman, Emma Johnson, Robert Plane, Andrew Marriner, James Campbell, David Campbell, Michael Collins, Janet Hilton and Dimitri Ashkenazy.
