= Mordechai Finzi =

Jewish mathematician, astronomer, grammarian, and physician in Mantua

Mordechai ben Abraham Finzi (Hebrew: מרדכי בן אברהם פינצי, c. 1407–1476 in Mantua) was a Jewish mathematician, astronomer, grammarian and physician in Mantua.

== Work ==
Finzi's astronomical tables were published under the title Luḥot, probably before 1480. He wrote glosses to Efodi's Hebrew grammar, Ḥesheb ha-Efod.

He also translated a number of mathematical books into Hebrew, such as a work of geometry under the title Ḥokmat ha-Medidah, and the Book of Algebra of Abu Kamil under the title Taḥbulat ha-Mispar.
