= Howard Ferguson (composer) =

Northern Irish composer and musicologist (1908–1999)

Howard Ferguson (21 October 1908 – 31 October 1999) was an Irish composer and musicologist from Belfast. He composed instrumental, chamber, orchestral and choral works. While his music is not widely known today, his Piano Sonata in F minor, Op. 8 and his Five Bagatelles, Op. 9, for piano are still performed. His works represent some of the most important 20th-century music to emerge from Northern Ireland.

== Biography ==
Ferguson was born in Belfast and attended Rockport School in Holywood, County Down, where his musical talent was recognized, leading to several school prizes. The pianist Harold Samuel heard him in 1922 and encouraged his parents to allow him to travel to London to become his pupil. Following further studies at Westminster School, Ferguson entered the Royal College of Music in 1924 to study composition with R. O. Morris and Ralph Vaughan Williams. He also studied conducting with Malcolm Sargent and formed a lifelong friendship with fellow-student Gerald Finzi with whom he attended Richard Strauss's Alpine Symphony at the Royal Albert Hall. His early compositions such as his Octet of 1933 (scored for the same forces as Franz Schubert's octet) met with considerable success.

During World War II, Ferguson helped Myra Hess run the popular, morale-boosting series of concerts at the National Gallery. From 1948 to 1963 he taught at the Royal Academy of Music, his students there including Richard Rodney Bennett, Cornelius Cardew and Ian Kellam. He regarded Bennett as having an astonishing natural talent, though lacking a personal musical style.

His music has a haunting, searching quality, as if a deeply personal question is being asked, but never answered (Tait 2007, see below). In the song cycle Discovery, the surrealistic poetic language of Denton Welch ("What are you in the morning when you wake? A quacking duck, a quacking drake?") is the ideal spark for Ferguson to express such private questioning in his aphoristic, fleeting settings (Tait). Ferguson produced what (according to Tait) is probably one of the greatest British solo piano works of the twentieth century, the stormy and passionate Piano Sonata, Op. 8, inspired by the death of a friend. Of his two violin sonatas, the second emerged after a long silence just after World War II; the ferocious energy of its finale has a spirit of escape and liberation, a suppressed voice finally speaking (Tait) (Ferguson had not had the time to compose during the war due to his other commitments). His miniatures, such as the Four Short Pieces for clarinet and piano and the Three Sketches for flute and piano, have a crystalline intensity, as if hinting at much larger works (Tait) – Anton Webern was a composer he admired, even if stylistically Ferguson's own work belongs to the sound world of twentieth century Romanticism. Ferguson was always highly self-critical as a composer: after writing the large choral work The Dream of the Rood in 1958–9, he received a commission to write a string quartet. It was during the composition of this that he felt he was merely repeating his previous work, so he destroyed the sketches and gave up composing, saying that in his relatively few works he had said all he wanted to say.

For the next decades he concentrated on musicology. His editions of such repertoire as early keyboard music and the complete piano sonatas of Schubert are outstanding, with a meticulous attention to detail which makes them authoritative (Tait). Ferguson also worked with Gerald Finzi to select and edit the songs of Ivor Gurney for publication after his death: five volumes of ten songs were issued between 1938 and 1979.

In his later years he lived in a white-painted converted farmhouse in Barton Road in Cambridge, his quiet hospitality legendary (Tait). He wrote a cookbook in the 1990s, Entertaining Solo, which commemorates the remarkable welcome he gave to so many friends, as does the memoir mentioned below. In the same decade he also prepared an edition of letters between himself and Gerald Finzi, which is an invaluable source of information on the professional lives of Ferguson and his circle. Late in his life, a friendship with the German singer Reiner Schneider-Waterberg led to his rediscovering a song written in 1958 as part of incidental music for a William Golding play, The Brass Butterfly, and subsequently rearranging it for counter-tenor and piano (originally harp) as "Love and Reason" (1958/1994), a moving postscript to a compositional output whose great characteristic is powerful emotions expressed through superb and strictly controlled craftsmanship. (Tait)

== Compositions ==
- Op. 1 Two Ballads, for baritone and orchestra (1928–32)
- Op. 2 Violin Sonata No. 1 (1931)
- Op. 3 Three Mediaeval Carols, for voice and piano (1932–33)
- Op. 4 Octet, for clarinet, bassoon, horn, string quartet and double-bass (1933)
- Op. 5a Partita, orchestral version (1935–36)
- Op. 5b Partita, version for two pianos or piano four hands (1935–36)
- Op. 6 Four Short Pieces, for clarinet or viola and piano (1932–36)
- Op. 7 Four Diversions on Ulster Airs, for orchestra (1939–42)
- Op. 8 Piano Sonata in F minor (1938–40)
- Op. 9 Five Bagatelles for piano (1944)
- Op. 10 Violin Sonata No. 2 (1946)
- Op. 11 Chauntecleer – ballet. (1948) Withdrawn and destroyed.
- Op. 12 Concerto for piano and strings (1950–51)
- Op. 13 Discovery, song-cycle to words by Denton Welch for voice and piano (1951)
- Op. 14 Three Sketches, for flute and piano (1932, revised 1952)
- Op. 15 Two Fanfares, for trumpets and trombones (1952)
- Op. 16 Overture for an Occasion for orchestra (1952–53)
- Op. 17 Five Irish Folksongs, for solo voice and piano (1954)
- Op. 18 Amore Langueo, for tenor, chorus and orchestra (1955–56)
- Op. 19 The Dream of the Rood, for soprano, chorus and orchestra (1958–59)
- [No opus number] String Quartet (c. 1959, sketches only, destroyed)
- Love and Reason for counter-tenor and piano (1958)

Other destroyed works include the early Short Symphony, part of which was absorbed into the Octet, and a Mass setting.

== Bibliography ==
- Ferguson, Howard: Keyboard Interpretation from the 14th to the 19th Century: An Introduction (Oxford: Oxford University Press, 1975)
- Ridout, Alan (ed.): The Music of Howard Ferguson: A Symposium (London: Thames Publishing, 1989)
- Ferguson, Howard: Music, Friends and Places: A Memoir (London: Thames Publishing, 1997)
- Howard Ferguson and Michael Hurd (eds.): Letters of Gerald Finzi and Howard Ferguson (Woodbridge: Boydell & Brewer, 2001).
- Euan Tait: "Quia Amore Langueo: The Friendship of Howard Ferguson", in: Abraxas Unbound (St. Austell: Abraxas Editions, 2007)

== Recordings ==
Ferguson's music has had many distinguished interpreters. These have included Myra Hess, who recorded the Piano Sonata in 1942, and Jascha Heifetz who recorded the first violin sonata in 1966. In addition, a live recording of Discovery, performed by Kathleen Ferrier and Ernest Lush in 1953, has been issued by Decca (475 6060).

More recent recordings include:

- Hyperion CDA 66130 (1984): Piano version of the Partita and the Piano Sonata, performed by Howard Shelley and Hilary MacNamara.
- EMI 0777 7 64738 2 6 (1986): Concerto for piano and strings and Amore langueo performed by Howard Shelley (piano), Martyn Hill (tenor), the London Symphony Chorus and the City of London Sinfonia, conducted by Richard Hickox.
- Chandos CHAN 9082 (1992): Contains Two Ballads, the orchestral version of the Partita and The Dream of the Rood. Performed by Anne Dawson (soprano), Brian Rayner Cook (baritone), the London Symphony Orchestra and Chorus, conducted by Richard Hickox.
- Chandos CHAN 9316 (1995): Contains the two violin sonatas, Three Medieval Carols, Four Short Pieces, Love and Reason, Discovery, Three Sketches, and Five Irish Folksongs. Performed by Sally Burgess (mezzo-soprano), Reiner Schneider-Waterberg (countertenor), John Mark Ainsley (tenor), David Butt (flute), Janet Hilton (clarinet), Lydia Mordkovitch (violin) and Clifford Benson (piano).
- Naxos 8.557290 (2005): Concerto for piano and strings, performed by Peter Donohoe and the Northern Sinfonia.
- Mike Purton Recording MPR 118 (2025): Four Short Pieces, Robert Plane (clarinet), Benjamin Frith (piano).
