= Dies Natalis (cantata) =

Solo vocal cantata by Gerald Finzi

Dies Natalis (Latin: "Natal Day" or "Day of Birth"), Op. 8, is a five-movement solo cantata composed in 1938–1939 by the twentieth-century English composer Gerald Finzi (1901–1956). It is a solo vocal cantata scored for a solo soprano or tenor accompanied by string orchestra, and features settings of four texts by Thomas Traherne (1636/37–1674), a seventeenth-century English Metaphysical poet, priest and theologian.

== History ==
Dies Natalis is a cantata for solo voice and string orchestra. The opening introductory orchestral movement is followed by four movements for accompanied voice in which Finzi set mystical texts by the seventeenth-century English poet Thomas Traherne (1636/37–1674). Finzi selected three of Traherne's poems, prefaced by prose drawn from the opening three sections of the Third Century in Centuries of Meditations. Written from 1938–1939, the score was published in 1946. Finzi conducted the work at the Three Choirs Festival in 1946.

The first recording of Dies Natalis, sponsored by the British Council, was one of only two recordings of Finzi's music made in his lifetime. Two of the three sessions took place in October 1946, and the third on 29 January 1947. For Finzi it was an unfortunate experience: the soprano soloist was Joan Cross, whom he disliked for being an opera singer, and for her close connection to Benjamin Britten, whose work he disliked. The conductor Boyd Neel was ill for one of the three sessions, and Finzi had to take over. His biographer, Diana McVeagh, suggests it may have been for the "Rhapsody", which was recorded on a particularly cold day - the coldest day in 50 years - and Joan Cross said afterwards, "I don't think I did justice to that piece, alas!".

In 1964, his son Christopher Finzi conducted the work for its second recording with the soloist Wilfred Brown. Brown had first sung Dies Natalis in 1952 under the composer's baton. Finzi's biographer, Diana McVeagh, describes Brown's interpretation in the recording as "among his finest: intelligent, poetic, and informed with his acute but gentle feeling for words."

== Movements ==
The work is in five movements:

1. "Intrada"
2. "Rhapsody" (Recitativo stromentato)
3. "The Rapture" (Danza)
4. "Wonder" (Arioso)
5. "The Salutation" (Aria)

N.G. Long has analysed Finzi's setting of the texts.

== Texts of sung movements ==
The following are the texts of movements 2,3, 4 and 5.

=== Rhapsody ===
Will you see the infancy of this sublime and celestial greatness? I was a stranger, which at my entrance into the world was saluted and surrounded with innumerable joys: my knowledge was divine. I was entertained like an angel with the works of God in their splendour and glory. Heaven and Earth did sing my Creator's praises, and could not make more melody to Adam than to me. Certainly Adam in Paradise had not more sweet and curious apprehensions of the world than I. All appeared new, and strange at first, inexpressibly rare and delightful and beautiful. All things were spotless and pure and glorious.

The corn was orient and immortal wheat, which never should be reaped nor was ever sown. I thought it had stood from everlasting to everlasting. The green trees, when I saw them first, transported and ravished me, their sweetness and unusual beauty made my heart to leap, and almost mad with ecstasy, they were such strange and wonderful things.

O what venerable creatures did the aged seem! Immortal cherubims! and the young men glittering and sparkling angels, and maids strange seraphic pieces of life and beauty! I knew not that they were born or should die; but all things abided eternally. I knew not that there were sins or complaints or laws. I dreamed not of poverties, contentions or vices. All tears and quarrels were hidden from mine eyes. I saw all in the peace of Eden. Everything was at rest, free and immortal.

=== The Rapture ===
Sweet Infancy!
O heavenly fire! O sacred Light!
How fair and bright!
How great am I
Whom the whole world doth magnify!

O heavenly Joy!
O great and sacred blessedness
Which I possess!
So great a joy
Who did into my arms convey?

From God above
Being sent, the gift doth me enflame,
To praise His Name.
The stars do move,
The sun doth shine, to show His Love.

O how divine
Am I! To all this sacred wealth
This life and health,
Who rais'd? Who mine
Did make the same! What hand divine!

=== Wonder ===
How like an angel came I down!
How bright are all things here!
When first among His works I did appear
O how their glory did me crown!
The world resembled His Eternity
In which my soul did walk;
And every thing that I did see
Did with me talk.

The skies in their magnificence
The lovely, lively air,
O how divine, how soft, how sweet, how fair!
The stars did entertain my sense;
And all the works of God, so bright and pure,
So rich and great, did seem,
As if they ever must endure
In my esteem.

A native health and innocence
Within my bones did grow,
And while my God did all His Glories show,
I felt a vigour in my sense
That was all Spirit. I within did flow
With seas of life, like wine;
I nothing in the world did know
But 'twas Divine.

=== The Salutation ===
These little limbs, these eyes and hands which here I find,
This panting heart wherewith my life begins;
Where have ye been? Behind what curtain were ye from me hid so long?
Where was, in what abyss, my new-made tongue?

When silent I, so many thousand, thousand years
Beneath the dust did in a chaos lie, how could I smiles, or tears,
Or lips, or hands, or eyes, or ears perceive?
Welcome, ye treasures which I now receive.

From dust I rise and out of nothing now awake,
These brighter regions which salute my eyes,
A gift from God I take, the earth, the seas, the light, the lofty skies,
The sun and stars are mine: if these I prize.

A stranger here, strange things doth meet, strange glory see,
Strange treasures lodged in this fair world appear,
Strange, all, and new to me: But that they mine should be who nothing was,
That strangest is of all; yet brought to pass.

== Recordings ==
- Decca AK 1645-7 (rec. 1946-47): Joan Cross; Boyd Neel Orchestra; Boyd Neel, conductor
- World Record Club SCM 50 (HMV HQS 1260) (rec. 1964): Wilfred Brown; English Chamber Orchestra; Christopher Finzi, conductor
- Argo ZRG 896 (rec. 1979): Philip Langridge; London Symphony Orchestra; Richard Hickox, conductor
- Hyperion CDA 66876 (rec. 1996): John Mark Ainsley; Corydon Orchestra; Matthew Best, conductor
- Philips 454 438-2 (rec. 1996): Ian Bostridge; Academy of St Martin in the Fields; Sir Neville Marriner, conductor
- Naxos 8.570417 (rec. 2007): James Gilchrist; Bournemouth Symphony Orchestra; David Hill, conductor
- Wigmore Hall Live WHLIVE 0021 (rec. 2007): Toby Spence; Scottish Ensemble
- Chandos CHAN 10590 (rec. 2009): Susan Gritton; BBC Symphony Orchestra; Edward Gardner, conductor
- Harmonia Mundi USA HMU 807552 (rec. 2011): Mark Padmore; Britten Sinfonia; Jacqueline Shave, director
