= Ivor Gurney =

English composer and poet (1890–1937)

- Gurney in his Gloucestershire Regiment uniform, c. 1915
- Born: Ivor Bertie Gurney; 28 August 1890; Gloucester, United Kingdom
- Died: 26 December 1937 (aged 47)
- Resting place: St Matthew's Church, Twigworth
- Monuments: Gloucester Cathedral; Gloucester Docks; St Mary de Lode Church, Gloucester; Hazeweidestraat, Sint-Juliaan, Belgium
- Education: The King's School, Gloucester; Royal College of Music
- Occupations: Composer, poet, organist, soldier

Ivor Bertie Gurney (28 August 1890 – 26 December 1937) was an English poet and composer. Born and raised in Gloucester, he suffered from bipolar disorder through much of his life and spent his last 15 years in psychiatric hospitals. Critical evaluation of Gurney has been complicated by this, and also by the need to assess both his poetry and his music. Gurney himself thought of music as his true vocation: "The brighter visions brought music; the fainter verse".

== Life ==
Ivor Gurney was born at 3 Queen Street, Gloucester, in 1890, as the second of four surviving children of David Gurney, a tailor, and his wife Florence, a seamstress.

He showed musical ability at an early age. He sang as a chorister at Gloucester Cathedral from 1900 to 1906, when he became an articled pupil of Herbert Brewer at the cathedral. There he met fellow composer Herbert Howells, who became a lifelong friend. Alongside Gurney and Howells, Brewer's third pupil at this time was Ivor Novello, then known as Ivor Davies. He also enjoyed an enduring friendship with the poet F. W. Harvey, whom he met in 1908.

The adults of most significance in Gurney's early life were the Rev. Alfred H. Cheesman, and two sisters, Emily and Margaret Hunt, who nurtured Gurney's interests in music and literature. Gurney began composing music at the age of 14, and won a scholarship to the Royal College of Music in 1911. He studied there with Charles Villiers Stanford, who also taught Ralph Vaughan Williams, John Ireland, Marion Scott, Rebecca Clarke, Frank Bridge, Arthur Bliss, Herbert Howells and many others. Stanford told Howells that Gurney was potentially "the biggest of them all", but he was "unteachable".

Gurney possessed a dynamic personality, but he had been troubled by mood swings that became apparent during his teenage years. He had a difficult time focusing on his work at college and suffered his first breakdown in 1913. After taking a rest, he seemed to recover and returned to college.

Gurney's studies were interrupted by World War I, when he enlisted as a private soldier in the Gloucestershire Regiment in February 1915. At the front, he began writing poetry seriously, sending his efforts to his friend, the musicologist and critic Marion Scott, who worked with Gurney as his editor and business manager. He was in the midst of writing the poems for what would become his first book, Severn and Somme, when he was wounded in the shoulder in April 1917. He recovered and returned to battle, still working on his book and composing music, including the songs "In Flanders" and "By A Bierside". Sidgwick & Jackson accepted Severn and Somme in July, with publication set for the autumn. In the meantime, Gurney was gassed in September the same year and sent to the Edinburgh War Hospital, where he met and fell in love with a VAD nurse, Annie Nelson Drummond, but the relationship later broke down.

There remains some controversy about the possible effects of the gas on his mental health, even though Gurney had clearly shown signs and symptoms of a bipolar disorder since his teens. "Being gassed (mildly) [his parenthesis] with the new gas is no worse than catarrh or a bad cold," Gurney wrote in a letter to Marion Scott on 17 September 1917. After his release from hospital, he was posted to Seaton Delaval, a mining village in Northumberland, where he wrote poems, including "Lying Awake in the Ward". His volume Severn and Somme was published in November 1917.

== Mental illness ==
Memorials to Ivor Gurney in Gloucester Cathedral

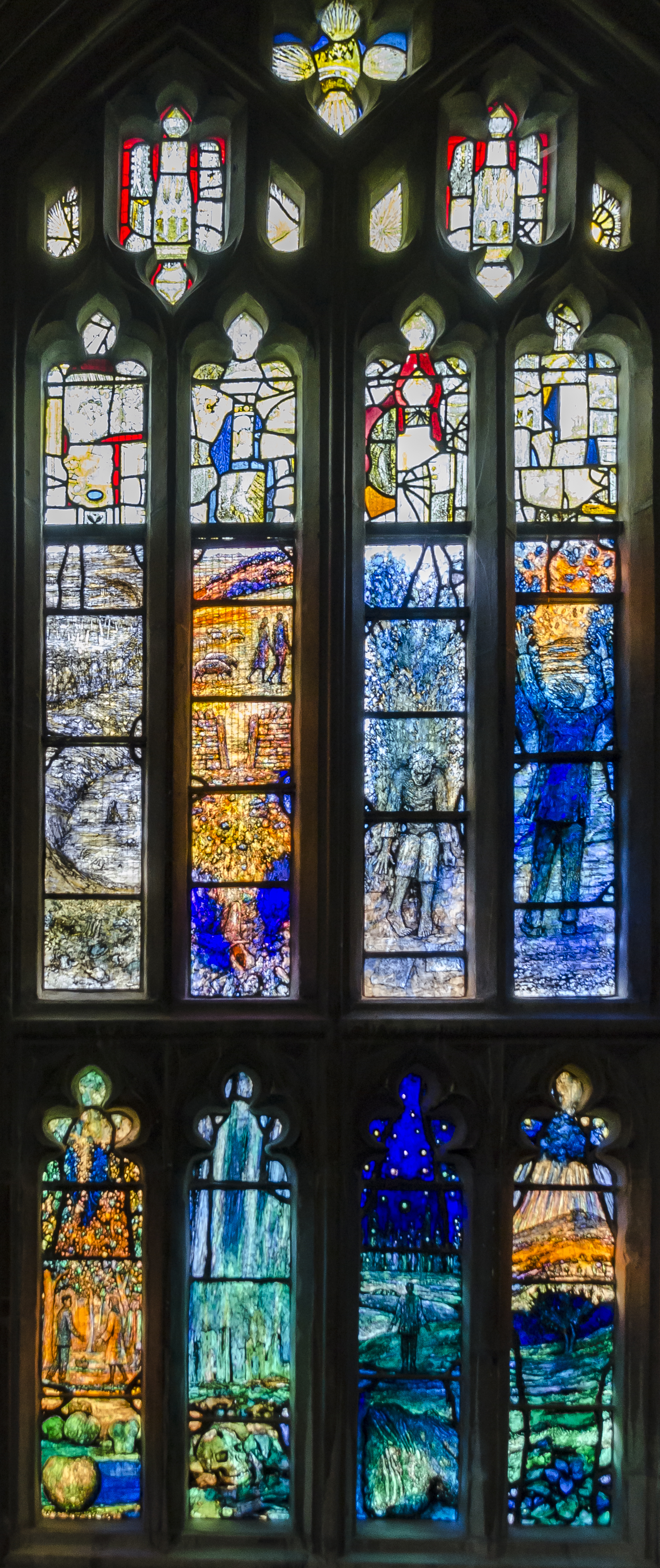
Gurney memorial window by Tom Denny (installed in 2014)

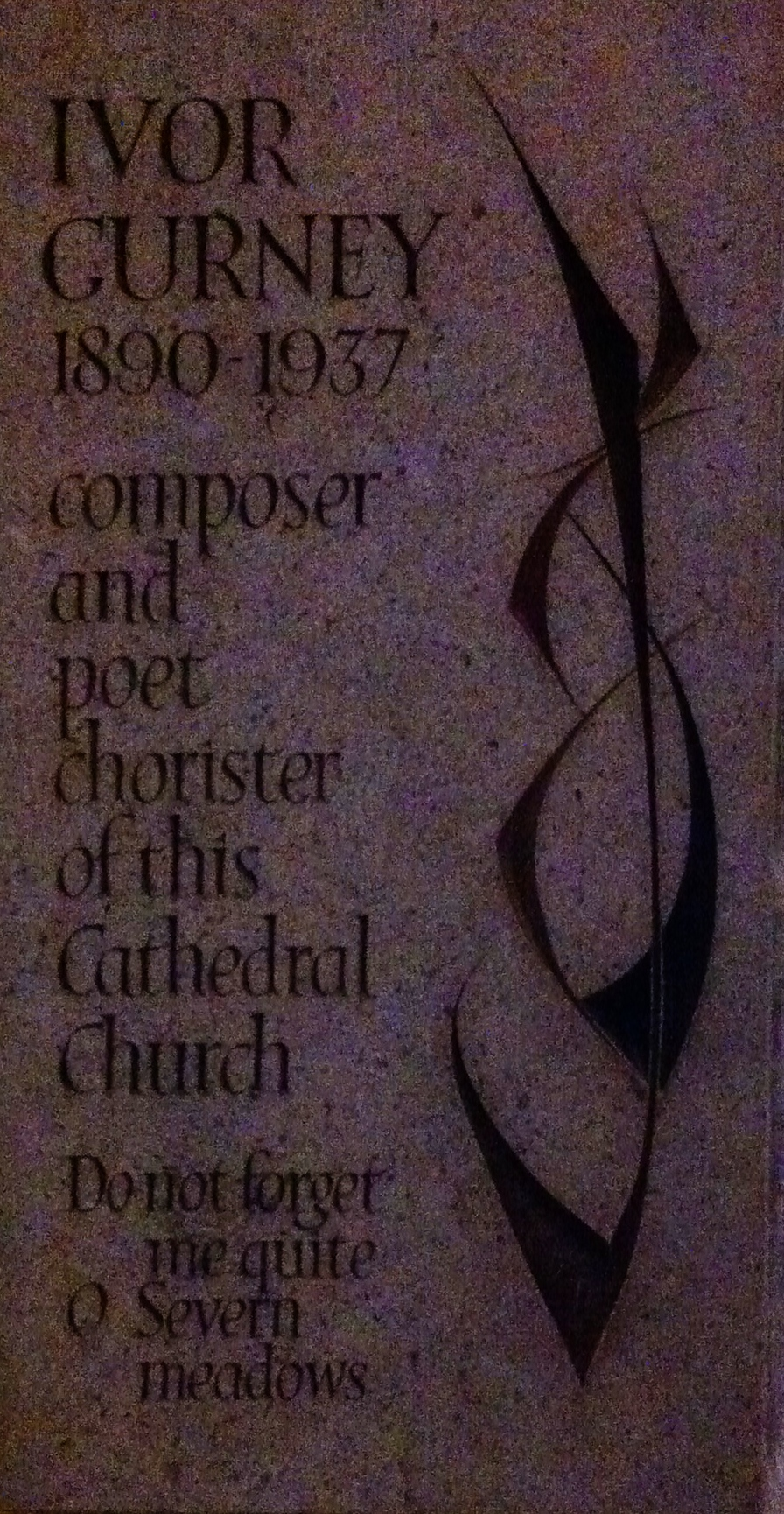
Gurney memorial plaque

In March 1918, Gurney suffered a serious mental breakdown, triggered at least in part by the sudden ending of his relationship with Drummond. He was hospitalised in the Gallery Ward at Brancepeth Castle, County Durham, where he wrote several songs, despite the piano sounding, he said, like "a boiler factory in full swing because of the stone walls". In June he threatened suicide, but he did not attempt it.

Gurney slowly regained some of his emotional stability and in October was honourably discharged from the army. Gurney received an unconventional diagnosis of nervous breakdown from "deferred" shell shock. The notion that Gurney's instability should primarily be attributed to "shell shock" was perpetuated by Marion Scott, who used this term in the initial press releases after Gurney's death, as well as in his entry for Grove's Dictionary of Music and Musicians.

Gurney seemed to thrive after the war and was regarded as one of the most promising men of his generation, but his mental distress continued to worsen. He studied for a brief time with Ralph Vaughan Williams upon returning to the Royal College of Music, but he withdrew from the college before completing his studies. His second volume of poetry, War's Embers, appeared in May 1919 to mixed reviews. He continued to compose, producing a large number of songs, instrumental pieces, chamber music, and two works for orchestra: War Elegy (1920) and A Gloucestershire Rhapsody (1919–1921). His music was being performed and published. However, by 1922, his condition had deteriorated to the point where his family had him declared insane.

It has been speculated that Gurney's mental problems may have resulted from syphilis, contracted either while he was a music student before the war, or perhaps while serving as a soldier in France. Blevins, Gurney's biographer, however, concludes that he did not suffer from syphilis. The issue has also been discussed, more recently, by Cambridge academic and broadcaster Kate Kennedy.

Gurney spent the last 15 years of his life in psychiatric hospitals, first for a short period at Barnwood House in Gloucester, and then at the City of London Mental Hospital, Dartford, where he was diagnosed as suffering from "delusional insanity (systematised)". Gurney wrote prolifically during the asylum years, producing some eight collections of verse. His output included two plays in Shakespearean style – Gloucester Play (1926) and The Tewkesbury Trial (1926). During this time he appeared to believe himself to be William Shakespeare in person. He continued also to compose music but to a far lesser degree. An examination of his archive suggests that up to two-thirds of his musical output remains unpublished and unrecorded.

By the 1930s Gurney wrote little of anything, although he was described by Scott as being "so sane in his insanity".

== Death and legacy ==
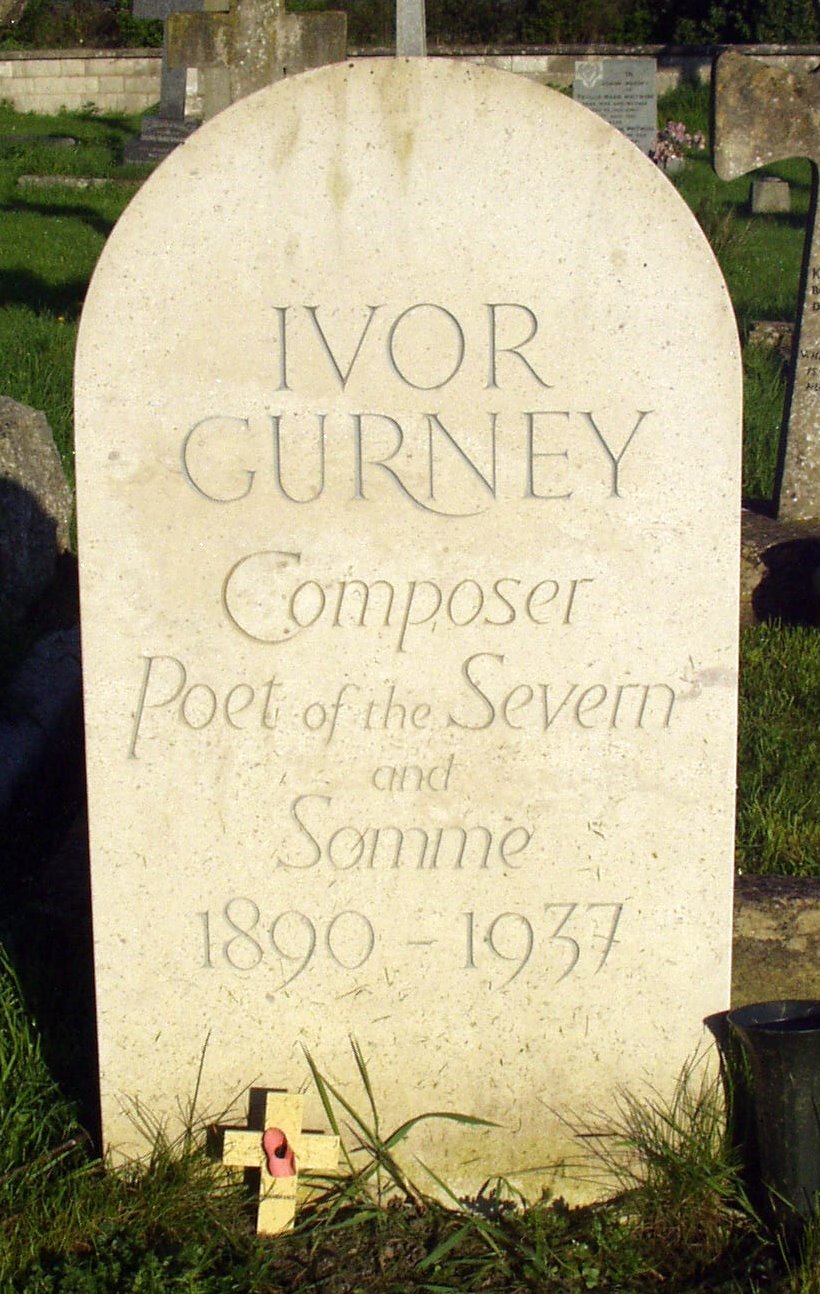
The grave of Ivor Gurney at Twigworth, Gloucestershire

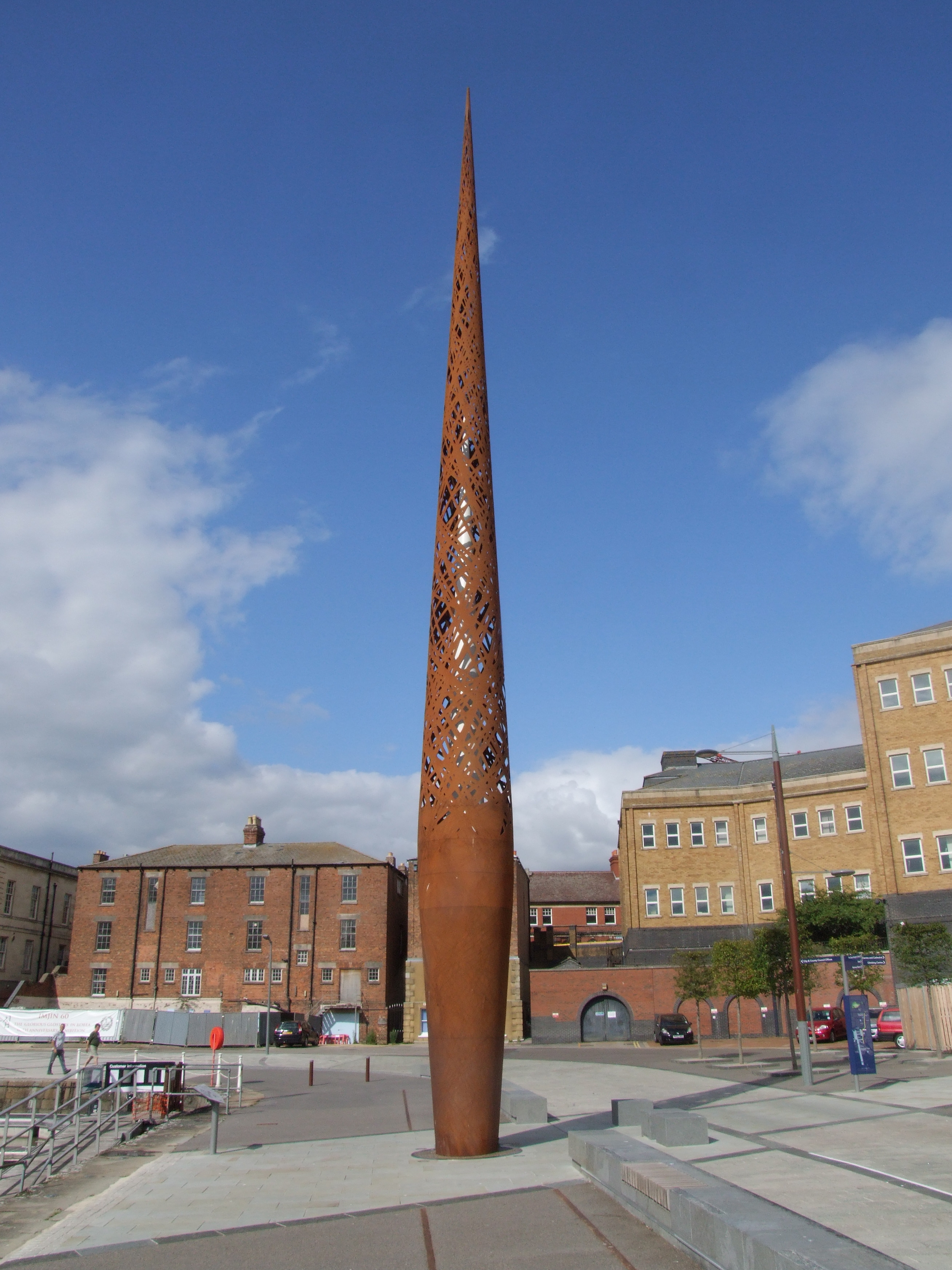
The Candle, Gloucester Docks (2011)

Gurney died of tuberculosis while still a patient at the City of London Mental Hospital, shortly before dawn on 26 December 1937, aged 47. He was buried in Twigworth, near Gloucester. The service was conducted by his godfather, Rev. Alfred Cheesman. Gurney was "a lover and maker of beauty", it was stated on his gravestone. (The stone was replaced after it was damaged – the original is now stored inside Twigworth church.) Marion Scott preserved Gurney's manuscripts and letters and worked with composer Gerald Finzi to ensure that his legacy should not be forgotten.

On 11 November 1985, Gurney was among 16 Great War Poets commemorated on a slate stone unveiled in Westminster Abbey's Poet's Corner. The inscription on the stone was taken from Wilfred Owen's "Preface" to his poems and reads: "My subject is War, and the pity of War. The Poetry is in the pity."

In 2000, a stained-glass window was installed in St Mary de Lode Church, Gloucester and dedicated to the memory of Ivor Gurney. A memorial to Gurney was erected in 2009 Sint-Juliaan, near Ypres, close to the spot where he was the victim of a mustard gas attack in 1917.

A sculpture by Wolfgang Buttress entitled The Candle was unveiled in 2011 in Victoria Dock, Gloucester Docks; it is inscribed with lines from Gurney's poem "Requiem" around the base. There is also a blue plaque memorial to Gurney in Eastgate Street, Gloucester.

In April 2014, BBC Four broadcast a documentary about Gurney, entitled The Poet Who Loved the War, presented by Tim Kendall, which focused on how the First World War had in some ways helped Gurney through the periods of depression he suffered and helped him become one of the war's foremost poets.

In June and July 2014 Gurney was the subject of BBC Radio 3's Composer of the Week, with contributions by Kate Kennedy and featuring a number of first recordings made by the BBC especially for the programme. In 2021 Kennedy published Ivor Gurney: Dweller in Shadows, claimed to be "the first comprehensive biography" of Gurney. The first comprehensive biography of Gurney to appear after Michael Hurd's 1978 biography was Ivor Gurney and Marion Scott: Song of Pain and Beauty by Pamela Blevins, The Boydell Press, 2008.

== Works ==
=== Compositions ===
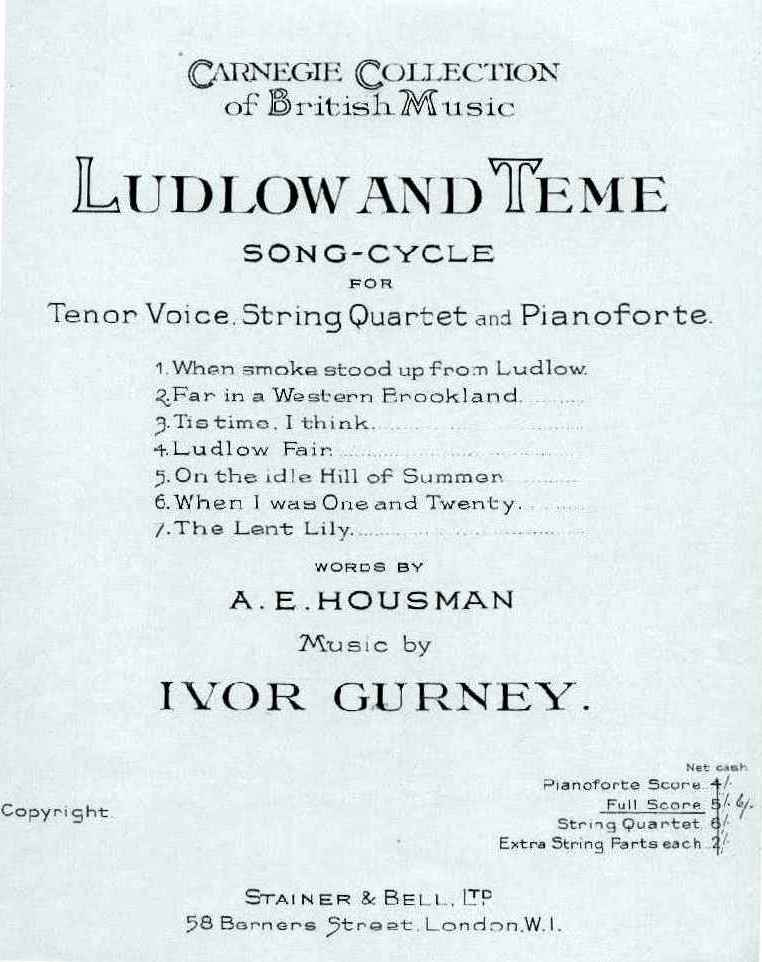
Cover of a 1923 edition of Gurney's song cycle Ludlow and Teme

Gurney wrote hundreds of poems and more than 300 songs but only set a handful of his own poems to music, the best-known of those being "Severn Meadows". The Five Elizabethan Songs (or 'The Elizas' as he called them) were written in 1913-14 while he was still a student at the Royal College of Music, and published in 1920 by Winthrop Rogers. The song cycles Ludlow and Teme (published 1923) and The Western Playland, (published 1926), both settings of poetry by A. E. Housman, were prepared for publication with the help of admirers and friends, including Gerald Finzi and his wife Joy, Howard Ferguson and Marion Scott. Oxford University Press issued two sets of ten songs in 1938, a year after his death, selected and edited by Finzi and Ferguson. Three further sets of ten songs came out in 1952, 1959 and 1979.

Gurney set to music many of the poems of his contemporaries, including at least nineteen poems written by Edward Thomas (six of them collected in the orchestral song cycle Lights Out published in 1926), at least seven by W. H. Davies and five by Rupert Brooke. All of Gurney's settings from the Canadian poet Bliss Carman's Sappho: One Hundred Lyrics (1904) were gathered in Seven Sappho Songs by Richard Carder in 1998.

It has been suggested that there is something of Schubert and Schumann, but considerably less of the prevailing folk idiom of the time, in the intensity of Gurney's musical language. He had a preference for setting dark ballads, as Schubert, Loewe and Brahms had before him, and "knew his Brahms and Schumann backwards, as his piano pieces testify". But where he does lean towards folksong, as in his setting of Belloc's "Ha’nacker Mill", it is often hard to tell whether the melody is original or traditional.

Gurney's instrumental and chamber music is only now coming to light. An exception are the Five Preludes for piano, which were written in 1919-20 and published the following year. But he also wrote four piano sonatas and as many as 20 string quartets, most of which have been lost. Three of the piano sonatas (No. 2 incomplete) have been recorded by George Rowley. The String Quartet in D minor, composed in 1924, received its premiere recording in 2020. There are also two violin sonatas, in E-flat major and in D major, both dating from 1918/19 and both now recorded.

=== War poet/local poet ===
Edmund Blunden, at the urging of Gerald Finzi, assembled the first collection of Gurney's poetry which was published in 1954. This was followed by P. J. Kavanagh's Collected Poems, first published in 1982 and reissued in 2004. It remains the most comprehensive edition of Gurney's poetry. Gurney is regarded as one of the great World War I poets, and like others of them, such as Edward Thomas, whom he admired, he often contrasted the horrors of the front line with the beauty and tranquillity of his native English landscape – these themes were explored in the 2012 musical play A Soldier and a Maker.

Deliberately unrhetorical in his poetic tone, and writing as a ranker, not an officer, Gurney offered a complex, wry, unheroic view of the soldierly world of the Western Front: presenting not a large statement (for or against war), but an individual experience. Without diminishing the horrors of the front line, Gurney's poems often emphasise the moments of relief. "On Rest" was above all what he called "the relief of knowing mere being". By detailing the "small trifles" of trench life – moments of comradeship, letters from home, singsongs, bread and Fray Bentos corned beef, wine, chocolate and café-au-lait Gurney was able (in Blunden's words) to "express part of the Western Front secret... with distinctive, intimate and imaginative quickness." In so far as he had a "manifesto", it was to present "the protest of the physical against the exalted spiritual; of the cumulative weight of small facts against the one large".

At the same time, Gurney was something of a local poet, rooted in Gloucester and its surroundings, which remained a touchstone of reality for him, in the front line and later in the asylum. In the preface to his first book, he wrote of "my county, Gloucester, that whether I live or die stays always with me." His tribute poem "Crickley Hill" was described by Edna Longley as "perhaps Gurney's most rapturous expression of local patriotism".

=== Collections of poetry and letters ===
- Severn & Somme, 1917
- War's Embers, 1919
- Poems by Ivor Gurney, 78 poems selected by Edmund Blunden, 1954
- Poems of Ivor Gurney, 1890-1937, 140 poems selected by Leonard Clark, 1973
- Collected Poems, ed. P. J. Kavanagh, 292 poems, 1982
- War Letters, ed. R.K.R. Thornton. Carcanet Press, 1983
- Collected Letters, ed. R.K.R. Thornton. Carcanet Press 1991
- Best Poems and The Book of Five Makings, ed. R.K.R. Thornton. Carcanet Press, 1995
- Severn & Somme and War's Embers, ed. R. K. R. Thornton. Carcanet Press, 1997
- 80 Poems or So, ed. George Walter and R. K. R. Thornton. Carcanet Press, 1997
- Rewards of Wonder: Poems of London, Cotswold and France, ed. George Walter. Carcanet Press, 2000
- Collected Poems (new edition, substantially revised and reordered) ed. P.J. Kavanagh. Fyfield Books (Carcanet Press), 2004
- Stars in a Dark Night: The Letters from Ivor Gurney to the Chapman Family. Anthony Boden (ed.), The History Press, 2004 (2nd edition)
- The Complete Poetical Works, Vol 1 ed. Philip Lancaster and Tim Kendall, Oxford University Press, 2020 (first of a projected five volume set).

==== Selected poems ====
The following poems provide an introduction to his work:

- "Strange Hells" – The effect of war on soldiers' psyches
- "The Ballad of Three Spectres" – A soldier's vision
- "Maisemore" – A soldier thinks of home
- "The Estaminet" – Comradeship
- "Purple and Black" – The politics of death
- "To the Poet before Battle" – A soldier poet prepares for the fight
- "To His Love" – A soldier writes to a dead comrade's lover of his death
- "The Silent One" – An account of a moment of terror during a battle

=== Five Elizabethan songs ===
- "Orpheus" (John Fletcher)
- "Sleep" (John Fletcher)
- "Spring" (Thomas Nashe)
- "Tears" (John Fletcher)
- "Under the Greenwood Tree" (William Shakespeare)

=== Other songs ===
Collections: Ludlow and Teme (1923) LT; Lights Out (1926) LO; The Western Playland (1926) WP; A First Volume of Ten Songs (1938) T1; A Second Volume of Ten Songs (1938) T2; A Third Volume of Ten Songs (1952) T3; A Fourth Volume of Ten Songs (1959) T4; A Fifth Volume of Ten Songs (1979) T5; Seven Sappho Songs (1998) SS

- "A Bird's Anger" (W H Davies)
- "A Cradle Song" (W B Yeats) T4
- "A Piper" (Seumas O'Sullivan) T4
- "All Night Under The Moon" (Wilfred Gibson) T1
- "All Suddenly the Wind" (Rupert Brooke)
- "An Epitaph" (Walter de la Mare) T2
- "A Sword" (Robin Flower) T2
- "Black Stitchel" (Wilfred Gibson) T1
- "Blaweary" (Wilfred Gibson) T2
- "Bread and Cherries" (Walter de la Mare) T2
- "Bright Clouds" (Edward Thomas) LO
- "Brown Is My Love" (anon.) T4
- "By a Bierside" (John Masefield) T5
- "Cathleen ni Houlihan" (W B Yeats) T1
- "Clouds" (Rupert Brooke)
- "Desire in Spring" (Francis Ledwidge) T5
- "Down by The Salley Gardens" (W B Yeats) T1
- "Dreams of the Sea" (W H Davies)
- "Early Morn" (W H Davies)
- "Edward, Edward" (anon.)
- "Epitaph in Old Mode" (J C Squire) T2
- "Even Such Is Time" (Sir Walter Raleigh) T4
- "Far in a Western Brookland" (A. E. Housman) LT
- "Goodnight to the Meadow" (Robert Graves) T3
- "Ha'nacker Mill" (Hilaire Belloc) T1
- "Hawk and Buckle" (Robert Graves) T2
- "Hesperus" (Bliss Carman) SS
- "I Praise the Tender Flower" (Robert Bridges) T3
- "In Flanders" (F W Harvey) T4
- "I Shall Ever be Maiden" (Bliss Carman) SS, T3
- "Is My Team Ploughing?" (Housman) WP
- "Lament" (Ivor Gurney)
- "Last Hours" (John Freeman) T2
- "Lights Out" (Edward Thomas) LO
- "Lonely Night" (Bliss Carman) SS
- "Loveliest of Trees" (Housman) WP
- "Love Shakes my Soul" (Bliss Carman) SS, T4
- "Ludlow Fair" (Housman) LT
- "Most Holy Night" (Hilaire Belloc) T4
- "Nine of the Clock" (Robert Graves) T1
- "Oh Happy Wind" (W H Davies)
- "One Day" (Rupert Brooke)
- "On the Downs" (John Masefield) T4
- "On the Idle Hill of Summer" (Housman) LT
- "Ploughman Singing" (John Clare) T3
- "Reveille" (Housman) WP
- "Scents" (Edward Thomas) LO
- "Severn Meadows" (Ivor Gurney) T5
- "Shepherd's Song" (Ben Jonson) T3
- "Snow" (Edward Thomas) T3
- "Soft Was the Wind" (Bliss Carman) SS
- "Song of Caibhan" (Ethna Carbery) T5
- "Song of Silence" (Ivor Gurney)
- "Snow" (Edward Thomas)
- "The Aspens" (Housman) WP
- "The Apple Orchard" (Bliss Carman) SS, T5
- "The Boat Is Chafing" (Walter de la Mare) T2
- "The Cherry Trees" (Edward Thomas) T3
- "The Cloths of Heaven" (W B Yeats) T5
- "The Far Country" (Housman) WP
- "The Fiddler of Dooney" (W B Yeats) T4
- "The Fields Are Full" (Edward Shanks) T5
- "The Folly of Being Comforted" (W B Yeats) T2
- "The Happy Tree" (Gerald Gould) T3
- "The Latmian Shepherd" (Edward Shanks) T1
- "The Lent Lily" (Housman) LT
- "The Moon" (W H Davies)
- "The Night of Trafalgar" (Thomas Hardy) T5
- "The Penny Whistle" (Edward Thomas) LO
- "The Quiet Mist" (Bliss Carman) SS
- "There's Wisdom in Women" (Rupert Brooke)
- "The Scribe" (Walter de la Mare) T2
- "The Ship" (J C Squire) T3
- "The Singer" (Edward Shanks) T1
- "The Sun at Noon to Higher Air" (Housman) WP
- "The Treasure" (Rupert Brooke)
- "The Trumpet" (Edward Thomas) LO
- "The Twa Corbies" (border ballad) T5
- "The White Cascade" (W H Davies)
- "Thou Didst Delight My Eyes" (Robert Bridges) T3
- "'Tis Time, I Think, by Wenlock Town" (Housman) LT
- "To Violets" (Robert Herrick) T4
- "Twice a Week" (Housman) WP
- "Walking Song" (F W Harvey) T5
- "When Death to Either Shall Come" (Bridges) T1
- "When I Was One-and-twenty" (Housman) LT
- "When on a Summer's Morning (W H Davies)
- "When Smoke Stood up from Ludlow" (Housman) LT
- "With rue my heart is laden" (Housman) WP
- "Will You Come?" (Edward Thomas) LO
- "You Are My Sky" (J C Squire) T1

== Recordings ==
- Gurney, Sainsbury, Elgar: Works for Violin and Piano. EM Records EMR CD011 (2013)
- Ivor Gurney. Songs. Naxos 8.572151 (2013)
- Ivor Gurney. Songs Volume 2. Naxos 8.574599 (2024)
- Never Such Innocence. ARS Produktion ARS38610 (2022)
- Severn Meadows: Songs by Ivor Gurney. Hyperion CDA 67243 (2001)
- Those Blue Remembered Hills. EM Records EMRCD065 (2020)

== See also ==
- George Butterworth
- The Path to Rome – A travelogue by Hilaire Belloc which Gurney described as his "trench companion"

== Sources ==
- P. J. Kavanagh, ed. (2004). Ivor Gurney, Collected poems (reprint ed.). Fyfield Books. ISBN 1-85754-709-8.
- Pamela Blevins. "Ivor Gurney and Marion Scott: Song of Pain and Beauty", The Boydell Press, 2008
- Pamela Blevins. "New Perspectives on Ivor Gurney's Mental Illness", The Ivor Gurney Society Journal, Vol. 6, 2000, pp. 29–58
- Pamela Blevins. "One Last Chance: Dr. Randolph Davis and Ivor Gurney", The Ivor Gurney Society Journal, Vol. 9, 2003, pp. 91–99
- Michael Hurd. The Ordeal of Ivor Gurney (1978)
- Kate Kennedy, ed. 'Ivor Gurney: Poet, Composer', Ivor Gurney Society Journal 2007
- Kate Kennedy. Dweller in Shadows: A Life of Ivor Gurney (2021)
