= Gloucester Service =

1946 choral composition by Herbert Howells

Magnificat and Nunc dimittis
- For the Cathedral Church of the Holy and Indivisible Trinity; Gloucester
- Sacred choral music by Herbert Howells
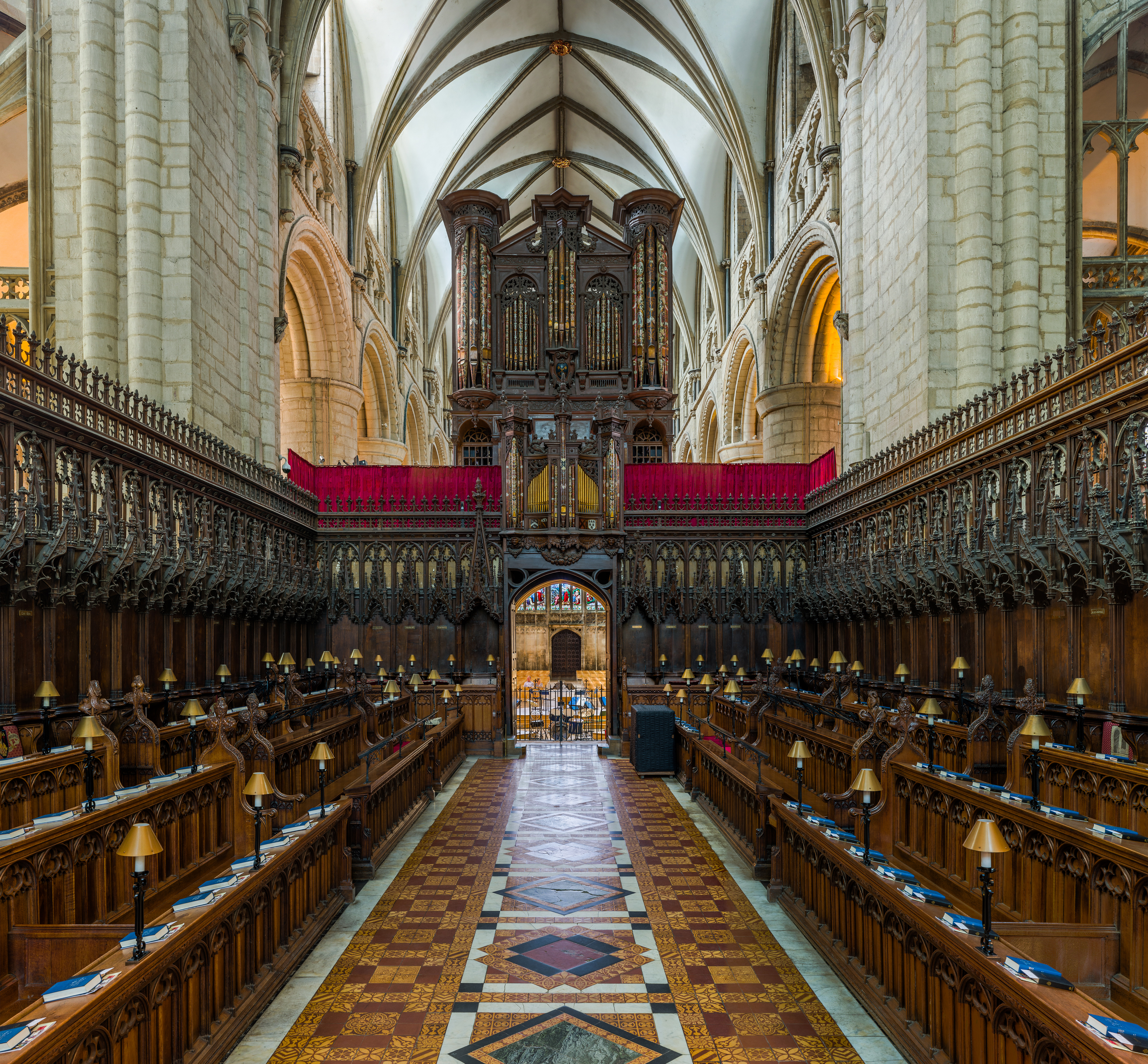
- The interior of Gloucester Cathedral
- Other name: Gloucester Service
- Text: Magnificat; Nunc dimittis
- Language: English
- Composed: 1946
- Published: 1947

The Magnificat and Nunc dimittis for Gloucester Cathedral, also known as the Gloucester Service, is a setting by the English composer Herbert Howells of the Magnificat and Nunc dimittis for the Anglican service of Evensong. Scored for four-part choir and organ, it was written in 1946 for Gloucester Cathedral. It was published by Novello in 1947.

== Text ==
The Magnificat (Song of Mary) and the Nunc dimittis (Song of Simeon) are biblical canticles. Mary sings the Magnificat ("My soul doth magnify the Lord") on the occasion of her visit to Elizabeth, as narrated in the Gospel of Luke (Luke 1:39–56). Simeon sings the Nunc dimittis ("Lord, now lettest thou thy servant depart in peace") when Jesus is presented in the temple (Luke 2:29–32). The canticles are part of the daily service of Evening Prayer in the Anglican church and have been set to music frequently.

== Music ==
Howells set the combination of Magnificat and Nunc dimittis 20 times, taking the words from the Book of Common Prayer. The Gloucester Service, his sixth setting, was written in 1946 and is scored for a four-part choir and organ. It is subtitled For the Cathedral Church of the Holy and Indivisible Trinity.

In the Gloucester Service, both canticles are set as one movement, with slight changes in tempo, and changes of key and time, to interpret the text. The Magnificat begins, marked "Con moto piacevole", with the sopranos alone, while the organ supplies a steady slow foundation of chords in halfnotes, and plays the melody after the voices in canon. The verse about being called "blessed" is sung by the divided sopranos. The text about "his mercy" is sung by four parts in imitation. Introduced by the organ, only the men sing in unison "He has showed strength", syncopated and with triplets, expanded to a unison of all voices for "He hath put down the mighty". The phrase "and hath exalted the humble" is marked by entrances in succession from the lowest voice to the highest, combined with crescendo. Marked "Meno messo" (Less moving), the basses introduce "He remembring his mercy", responded by four other voices, with again divided sopranos. The doxology repeats material from the beginning, but now in imitation of four voices. The Amen is again for five parts, in rich harmony but soft and further diminishing to a long last chord when all parts are divided.

The Nunc dimittis, marked "Tranquillo a poco lento" (Calm and somewhat slow), is set in more homophony. After a few measures of organ introduction, the lower voices enter with a long chord, on which the sopranos begin a melody, all voices joining for "depart in peace", ended with another long chord marked pianissimo. The doxology is built from material of the first one. Divided tenors emphasize the phrase "world without end", while all voices are divided for the final soft Amen.

Howells knew Gloucester Cathedral's acoustics very well, as he was a pupil of Sir Herbert Brewer, the cathedral's organist. Howells used the resonant space for "fervent, majestic" doxologies concluding both canticles, but with a quiet and reflective close. Eric Milner-White, then Dean of York, is reported to have been "in inward tears for the rest of the day" after he first heard the Nunc dimittis.

The composer's biographer, Christopher Palmer, described the Gloucester Service as being one of the three Howells canticle settings that "tower above the rest" (the others being Collegium Regale for King's College, Cambridge, and the St Paul's Service for St Paul's Cathedral) where the music "burns through the words' patina of familiarity into a dramatic and purposeful entity", while reflecting their "constantly varying nuances and inflections".

== Recordings ==
The service has been recorded several times, including a 2012 recording of music by Howells, called Requiem, combined with anthems, the St Paul's Service, and the Requiem, performed by the Choir of Trinity College, Cambridge, conducted by Stephen Layton, with organists Simon Bland and Jeremy Cole.

== See also ==
- List of compositions by Herbert Howells
