= St Paul's Service =

1950 composition by Herbert Howells

Magnificat and Nunc dimittis for St Paul's Cathedral
- Sacred choral music by Herbert Howells
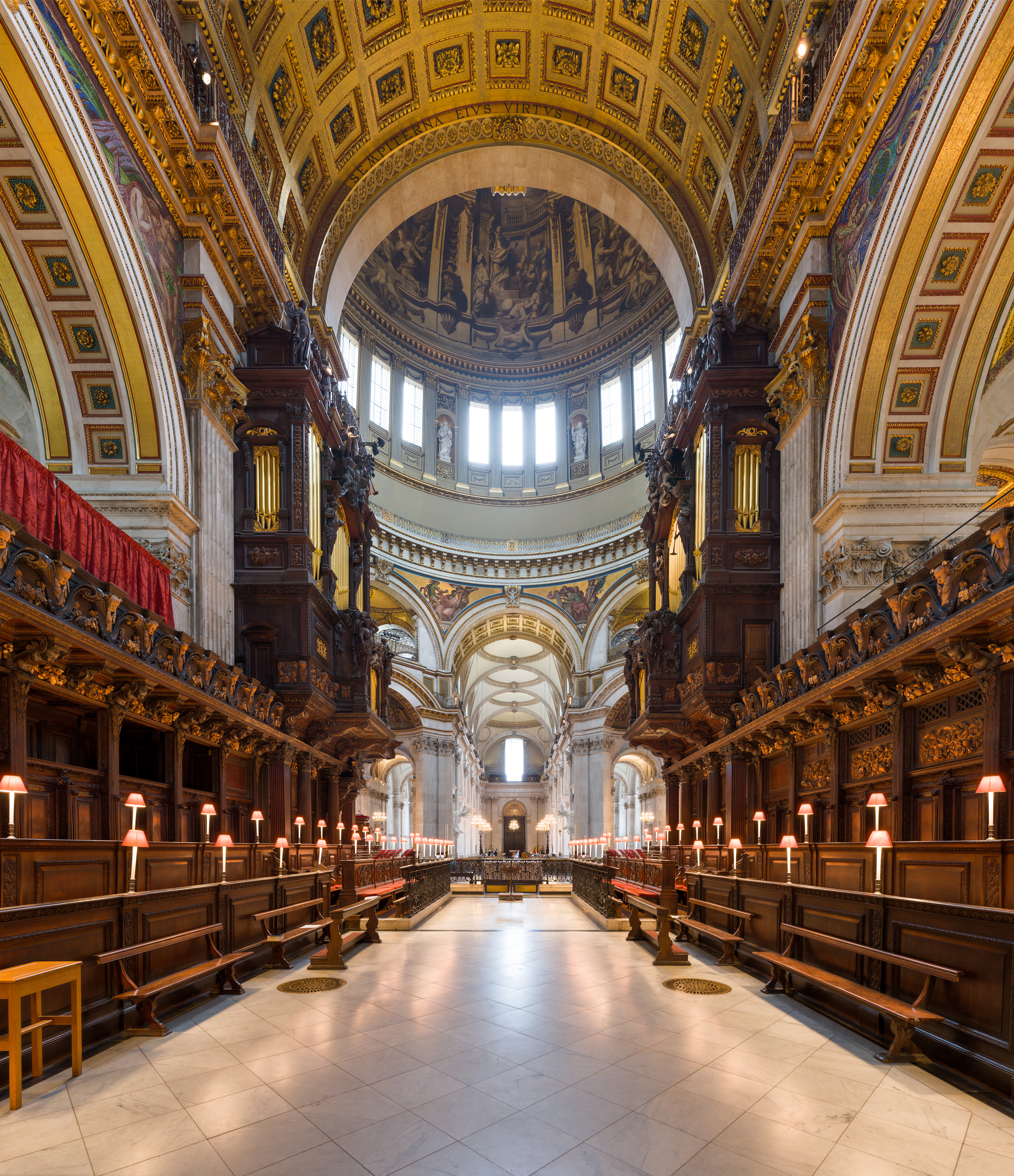
- The interior of St Paul's Cathedral
- Other name: St Paul's Service
- Text: Magnificat; Nunc dimittis
- Language: English
- Composed: 1950

The Magnificat and Nunc dimittis for St Paul's Cathedral, also known as the St Paul's Service, is a setting by the English composer Herbert Howells of the Magnificat and Nunc dimittis for the Anglican service of Evensong. Scored for four-part choir and organ, it was written in 1950 for St Paul's Cathedral in London.

== History and text ==
The Magnificat (Song of Mary) and the Nunc dimittis (Song of Simeon) are biblical canticles. Mary sings the Magnificat ("My soul doth magnify the Lord") on the occasion of her visit to Elizabeth, as narrated in the Gospel of Luke (Luke 1:39–56). Simeon sings the Nunc dimittis ("Lord, now lettest thou thy servant depart in peace") when Jesus is presented in the temple (Luke 2:29–32). The canticles are part of the daily service of Evening Prayer in the Anglican church and have been set to music frequently.

Howells set the combination of Magnificat and Nunc dimittis 20 times, taking the words from the Book of Common Prayer. The St Paul's Service is scored for a four-part choir and organ. He finished it at his home in Barnes, London, on 26 December 1950. He later wrote that this was "the most extended in scale" of the canticle settings he wrote, and that the "great spaces" of St Paul's influenced the music, since the cathedral's long echo meant that changes of harmony and tonality had to take place in "more spacious ways" than if it was a less reverberant building. While this meant that "climaxes are built more slowly", he said that it led to a "heightened volume of sound, and a tonal opulence commensurate with a vast church."

The composer's biographer, Christopher Palmer, described the St Paul's Service as being one of the three Howells canticle settings that "tower above the rest" – the others being his settings for King's College, Cambridge (Collegium Regale) and the Gloucester Service – where the music "burns through the words' patina of familiarity into a dramatic and purposeful entity", while reflecting their "constantly varying nuances and inflections".

== Recordings ==
The service has been recorded several times, including a 1988 collection The Music of St. Paul's Cathedral, performed by the cathedral choir conducted by John Scott with organist Christopher Dearnley, and a 1997 overview of ten settings of Magnificat and Nunc dimittis by English composers, performed by the Choir of York Minster conducted by Philip Moore and with organist John Scott Whiteley. A 2012 recording of music by Howells, called Requiem, combines it with anthems, the Gloucester Service, and the Requiem, performed by the Choir of Trinity College, Cambridge, conducted by Stephen Layton, with organists Simon Bland and Jeremy Cole.

== See also ==
- List of compositions by Herbert Howells
