= List of compositions by Herbert Howells =

Works by the British composer Herbert Howells (17 October 1892 – 23 February 1983).

== Sacred choral works ==
Dedications

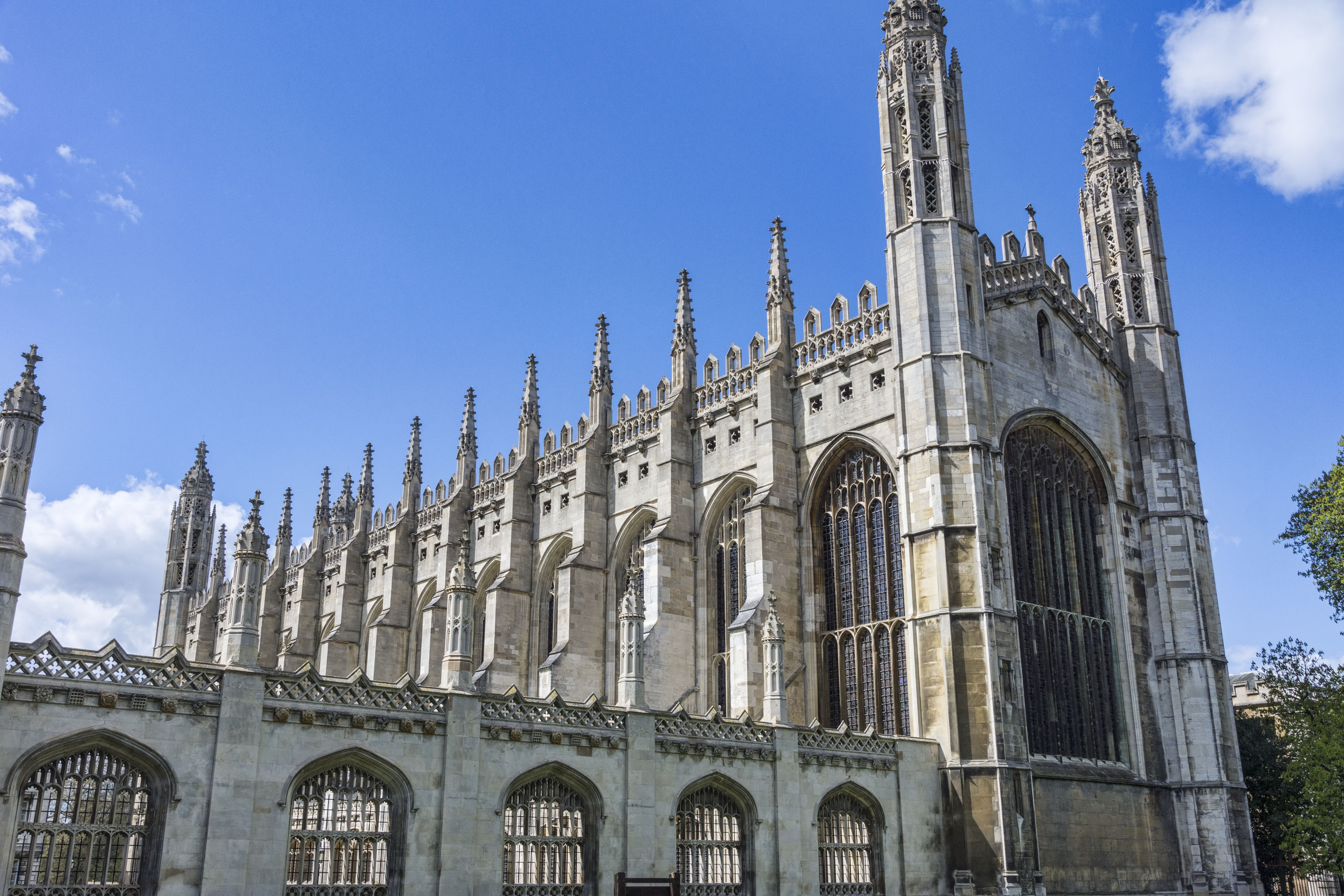
King's College Chapel

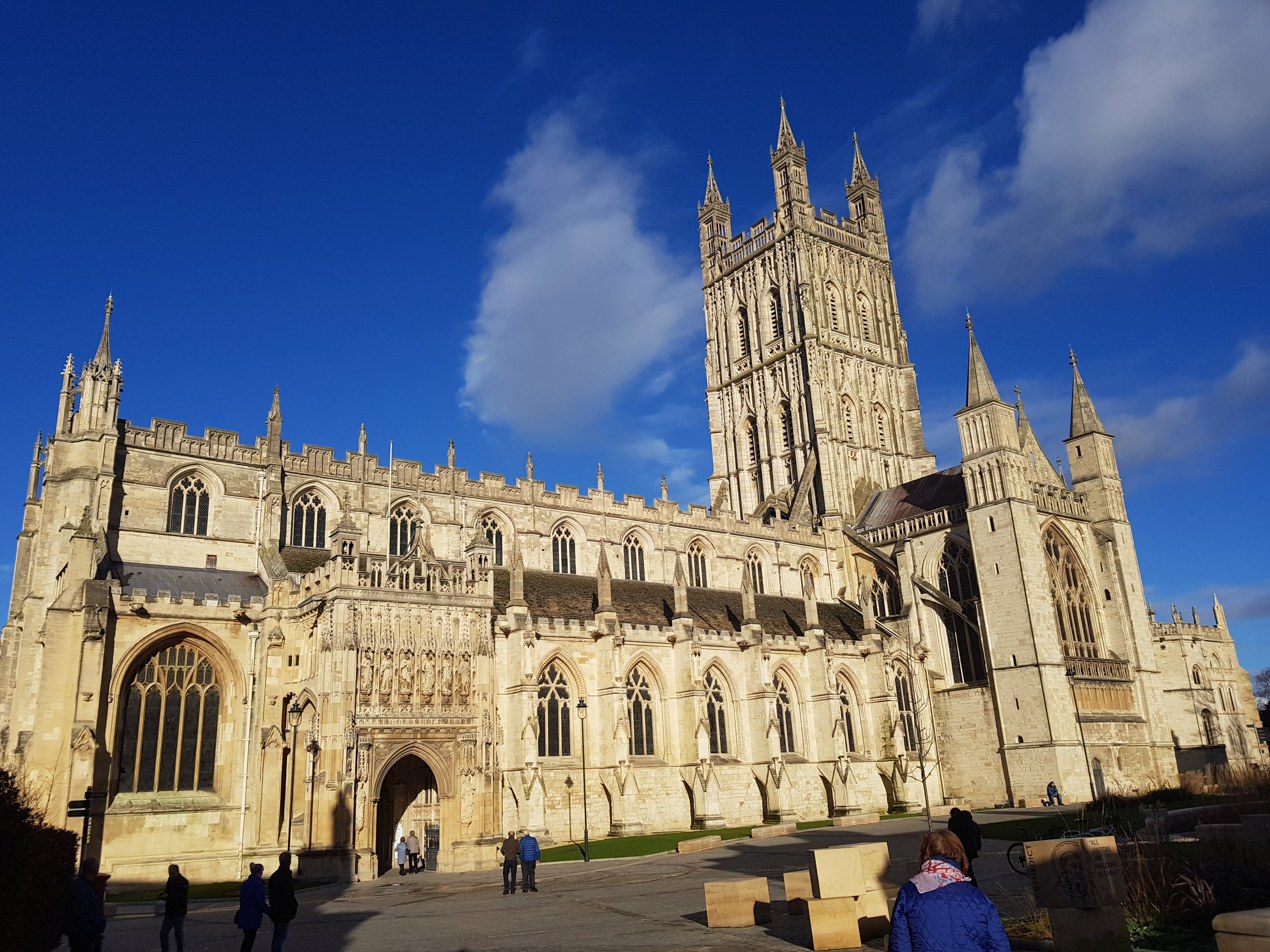
Gloucester Cathedral

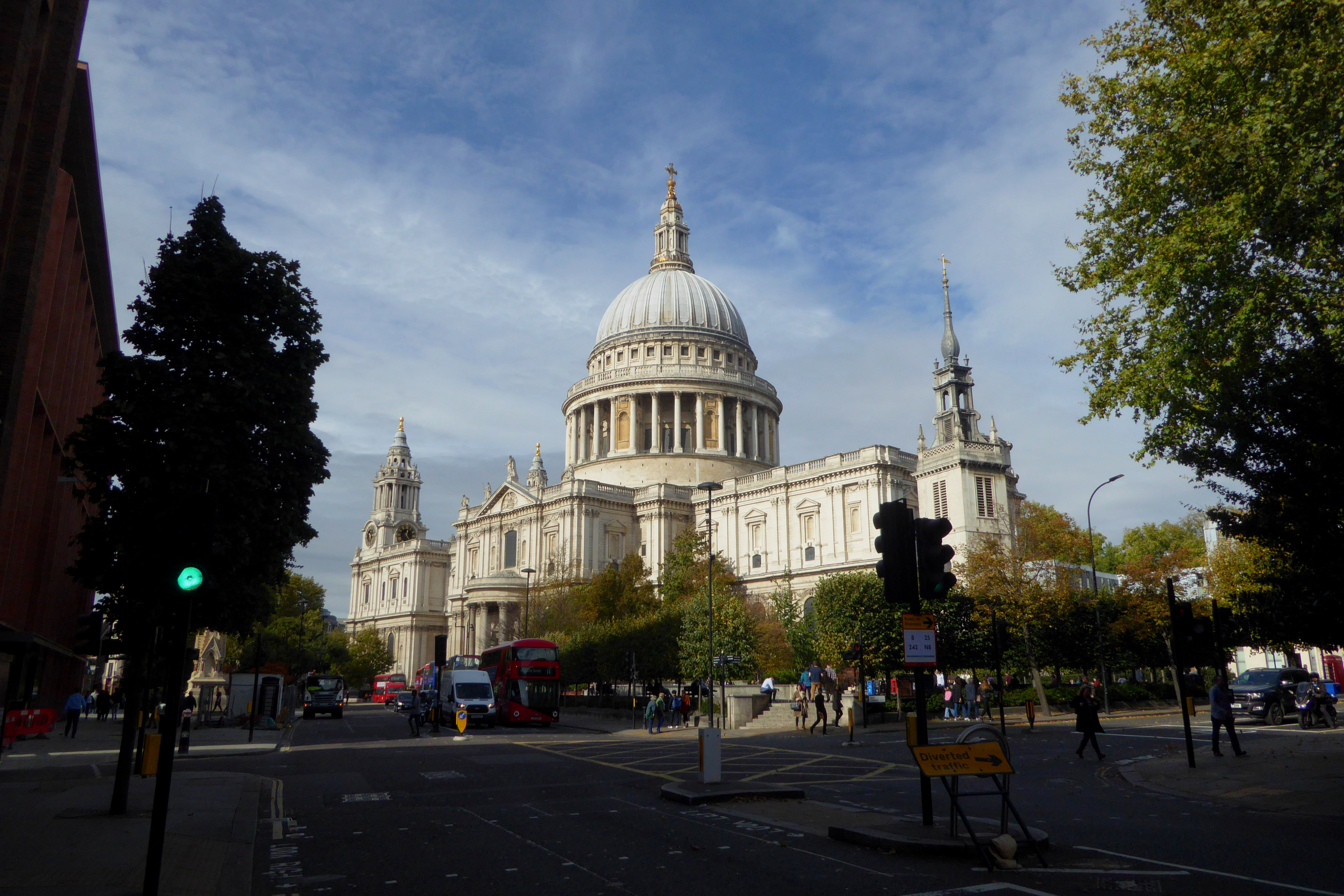
St Paul's Cathedral

Many choral works by Howells are dedicated to places of worship in England and elsewhere

=== Service settings and canticles ===
- Missa Sine Nomine (Mass in the Dorian Mode) (1912)
- Magnificat and Nunc Dimittis in G (1918)
- Requiem (1932)
- Magnificat and Nunc Dimittis for Men's Voices and Organ (1941)
- Collegium Regale (1944/45)
- Gloucester Service (1946)
- Te Deum and Benedictus for Christ Church Cathedral, Canterbury (1947)
- Magnificat and Nunc Dimittis (New College Oxford) (1949)
- Magnificat and Nunc dimittis for St Paul's Cathedral (1950)
- Magnificat and Nunc Dimittis (Worcester) (1951)
- Hymnus Paradisi (1951)
- Te Deum and Benedictus for St George's Chapel, Windsor (1952)
- Missa Sabriensis for Worcester Cathedral (1954)
- Office of the Holy Communion (Collegium Regale) (1956)
- Magnificat and Nunc Dimittis in B minor (1956)
- Magnificat and Nunc Dimittis (St Peter's, Westminster) (1957)
- Magnificat and Nunc dimittis (Collegium Sancti Johannis Cantabrigiense) (1957)
- Missa Aedis Christi (1958)
- Stabat Mater (1965)
- Te Deum for St. Mary Redcliffe, Bristol (1965)
- Magnificat and Nunc Dimittis (Sarum) (1966)
- Te Deum for Searle Wright at St Paul's Church Columbia University (1966)
- Magnificat and Nunc Dimittis (Winchester) (1967)
- Magnificat and Nunc Dimittis (Chichester) (1967)
- Magnificat and Nunc Dimittis (St. Augustine's Birmingham) (1967)
- Preces and Responses (1967)
- Coventry Mass (1968)
- Magnificat and Nunc Dimittis (Hereford) (1969)
- Magnificat and Nunc Dimittis (Collegium Magdalenae Oxoniense) (1970)
- Magnificat and Nunc Dimittis (York) (1973)
- Te Deum for the West Ridings Cathedrals Festival (1974)
- Magnificat and Nunc Dimittis (Dallas) (1975)
- Te Deum for Washington Cathedral

=== Hymn tunes ===
- Erwin (1967)
- In Manus Tuas (1968)
- Kensington (1968)
- Michael ("All My Hope on God is Founded") (1938)
- Newnham (1968)
- Salisbury (1968)
- Sancta Civitas (1962)
- Twigworth ("God is love, let heaven adore him") (1968)

=== Anthems ===
- Even such is Time – motet for double choir SATB.SATB unaccompanied (1913)
- Nunc Dimittis − motet for double choir SATB.SATB unaccompanied (c. 1914)
- Regina Caeli for SATB unaccompanied (1915; publ. 1987)
- Salve Regina for SATB unaccompanied (1915; publ. 1987)
- O Salutaris Hostia for SATB unaccompanied (1915; publ. 1987)
- A True Story − secular 2-part song for female voices and piano (1917)
- Here is the little door for SATB unaccompanied (1918)
- Haec Dies for SATB unaccompanied (MS dated 1918)
- A Spotless Rose for SATB unaccompanied (1919)
- Blessed are the Dead − motet for double choir SATB.SATB unaccompanied (1920; unfinished - completed by Patrick Russill)
- A Golden Lullaby − Unison song for voices and piano (1920)
- Sing lullaby for SATB unaccompanied (1920)
- O Lord, Who Createst Man − 3-part song for female voices and piano (1923)
- When First Thine Eyes Unveil for SATB & Organ (1925)
- My Eyes For Beauty Pine for SATB & Organ (1925)
- Tune thy Music − Unison song for voices and piano (1927)
- Requiem for SATB unaccompanied; words from various sources. (1932; publ. 1981)
- O Pray for the Peace of Jerusalem for SATB & Organ (1941)
- We have heard with our ears for SATB & Organ (1941)
- Like as the hart for SATB & Organ (1941)
- Let God Arise for SATB & Organ (1941)
- God is Gone Up for SATB & Organ (1944; publ. 1958)
- The Key of the Kingdom − 2-part song for female voices and piano (1948)
- Where Wast Thou? − Motet for Canterbury for SATB & Organ (1948)
- King of Glory for SATB & Organ (1949)
- Levavi oculos meos for unison Sopranos & Organ (1950’s?)
- Long Long Ago for SATB unaccompanied (1950)
- Behold O God Our Defender for SATB & Organ (1952)
- The House of the Mind for SATB & Organ (1954)
- A Christmas Carol − So now is come our Joyful'st Feast − Unison song for voices and piano (1958)
- A Hymn for St. Cecilia for SATB & Organ (1960)
- Coventry Antiphon for SATB & Organ (1961)
- A Sequence for St. Michael for SATB & Organ (1961)
- Take Him, Earth, for cherishing − Motet in memory of J. F. Kennedy, for SATB unaccompanied (MS dated June 6 1964)
- Holy Spirit Ever Dwelling − Hymn Tune, Salisbury (1964)
- God is love, let Heav'n adore him − Hymn Tune, Twigworth (1964)
- God be in my head for SATB unaccompanied (1966)
- Benedictus es, Domine for SATB & Organ (1967)
- Preces and Responses for SATB unaccompanied (1967)
- Lord By Whose Breath All Souls and Seeds are Living - Hymn Tune, Erwin (publ. 1967)
- O Holy City seen of John − Hymn Tune, Sancta Civitas (1968)
- One Thing have I Desired for SATB unaccompanied (1968)
- Thee Will I Love for SATB & Organ (1970)
- Now Abideth Faith, Hope and Charity for SATB & Organ (1972)
- Come my Soul for SATB unaccompanied (1972)
- Exultate Deo for SATB & Organ (1974)
- The Fear of the Lord for SATB & Organ (1976)
- I love all beauteous things for SATB & Organ (1977)
- Sweetest of Sweets for SATB unaccompanied (1977)
- Tryste Noël for SATB & Piano (1977)
- Hills of the North, Rejoice for SSA & Organ (1977)
- Antiphon for SATB unaccompanied (1978)
- I would be true for SATB & Organ (1978)

== Orchestral works ==
- Concerto for String Orchestra (1938)
- Fanfare (1977)
- The King's Herald (1937)
- Cello Concerto (1936)
- Merry-Eye (1920)
- Music for a Prince: Two Pieces for Orchestra (1948)
- Penguinski (1933)
- Piano Concerto No. 2 in C, Op. 39 (1925)
- Serenade for 4 solo violins and string orchestra (1917)
- Puck's Minuet (1917)
- Piano Concerto No. 1 in C minor, Op. 4 (1913)
- Suite for string orchestra (1942)
- Elegy for viola, string quartet and string orchestra, Op. 15 (1917)

== Chamber works ==
- Three Dances (1915)
- Lady Audrey's Suite, Op. 19 (String Quartet No. 1) (1915)
- Piano Quartet in A minor, Op. 21 (1916)
- Fantasy String Quartet, Op. 25 (String Quartet No. 2) (1917)
- Rhapsodic Quintet, Op. 31 (1919)
- String Quartet No. 3, "In Gloucestershire" (1916–20)
- Oboe Sonata (1942) (suppressed)
- Clarinet Sonata (1946)

== Keyboard works ==
=== Piano, clavichord ===
(Some of these are specifically for piano, some are for clavichord but playable on either.)

- Summer Idyls (1911)
- Phantasy (1917)
- Harlequin Dreaming (1918)
- Lambert's Clavichord, opus 41 (1927)
- My Lord Harewood's Galliard (1949)
- Howells' Clavichord (1961)
- Polka for two pianos (1951)
- Finzi: His Rest (1956)
- Siciliana (1958)
- Pavane and Galliard (1964)
- Petrus Suite (1967-73)

=== Organ ===
- Cradle Song (1913)
- Flourish for a Bidding (1969)
- Fugue, Chorale and Epilogue (1940)
- Intrada No. 2 (1941)
- Master Tallis's Testament (1940)
- Organ Sonata No. 1 in C (1911)
- Paean (1940)
- Partita (1972)
- Prelude De Profundis (1958)
- Preludio Sine Nomine (1940)
- Three Rhapsodies (1919)
- Rhapsody No. 4 Bene Psallite in Vociferatione (1958)
- Saraband for the Morning of Easter (1940)
- Saraband in Modo Elegiaco (1945)
- Siciliano for a High Ceremony (1952)
- Six Pieces for organ (1945)
- Six Short Pieces for Organ
- Organ Sonata No. 2 (1933)
- St. Louis comes to Clifton (1977)
- Epilogue (Hovingham Sketches) (1974)
- Three Pieces for organ (1977)
- Three Psalm Preludes Set 1 (1916)
- Three Psalm Preludes Set 2 (1939)
- Two Pieces (1959)
- Two Slow Airs for Organ (1928)

== Chorus and orchestra ==
- Behold, O God, Our Defender (1952)
- An English Mass (1955)
- The House of the Mind (1954)
- A Hymn for St Cecilia (1960)
- Hymnus Paradisi (1938)
- A Kent Yeoman's Wooing Song (1933)
- A Maid Peerless (1951)
- Michael- a Fanfare Setting
- Missa Sabrinensis - The Severn Mass (1954)
- O Mortal Man (Sussex Mummers' Carol)
- Sine Nomine: A Phantasy (1922)
- Sir Patrick Spens (1917)
- Stabat Mater (1963)
- Te Deum (1944)
- When Cats Run Home (1907)

=== Harp ===
- Prelude for Harp (1915)
