= Collegium Regale =

Composition by Herbert Howells

- For the King's College, Cambridge
- Sacred choral music by Herbert Howells
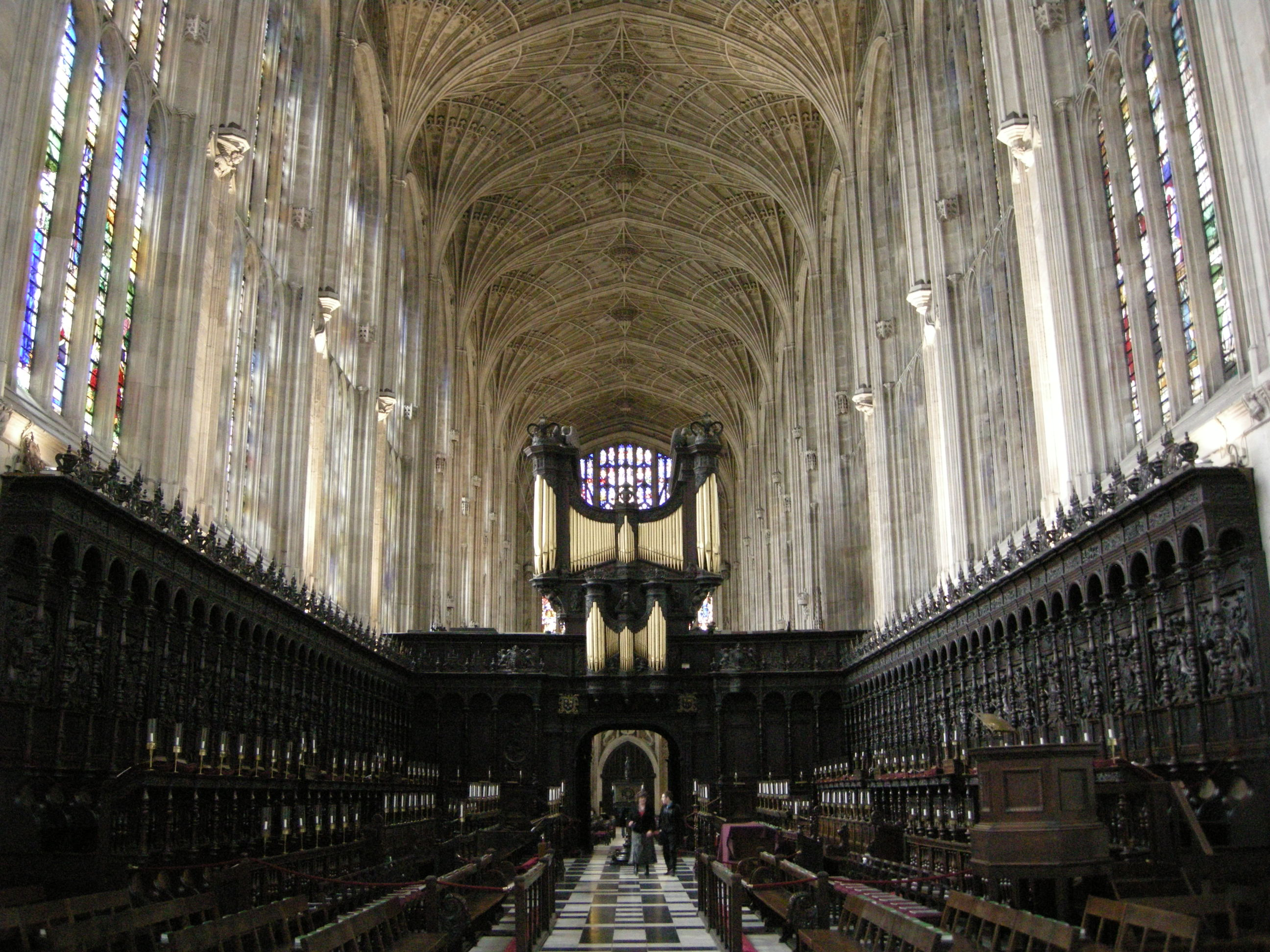
- Choir of King's College Chapel, Cambridge
- Text: Te Deum; Jubilate; Magnificat; Nunc dimittis; Office of Holy Communion (Book of Common Prayer)
- Language: Early Modern English
- Composed: 1944 – 1956
- Published: 1947

Collegium Regale is a collection of choral settings by the English composer Herbert Howells of the canticles for the Anglican services of Mattins, Holy Communion and Evening Prayer. Scored for four-part choir, solo tenor and organ, the pieces were written between 1944 and 1956 "for the King's College, Cambridge" (Collegium Regale in Latin). The first of the pieces were first published by Novello in 1947, and they have become a popular piece of music in the Anglican church music repertoire.

== Text ==
The text of the first service setting for the daily service of Mattins in the Anglican church consists of two pieces: the Te Deum, an ancient Latin Christian hymn; and the Jubilate a setting of Psalm 100.

The setting of the evening canticles, part of the Anglican daily service of Evening Prayer, consists of the Magnificat (Song of Mary) and Nunc dimittis (Song of Simeon). Mary sings the Magnificat ("My soul doth magnify the Lord") on the occasion of her visit to Elizabeth, as narrated in the Gospel of Luke (Luke 1:39–56). Simeon sings the Nunc dimittis ("Lord, now lettest thou thy servant depart in peace") when Jesus is presented in the temple (Luke 2:29–32).

Howells also set the text of the Office of the Holy Communion to music; like the morning and evening offices, the text is taken from the Book of Common Prayer. Because the Anglican liturgy is originally derived from the Roman Catholic Ordinary of the Mass, the pieces correspond with the sections of a Mass setting: Kyrie, Credo, Sanctus, Benedictus, Agnus Dei and Gloria in excelsis. Each section is titled in Greek or Latin, but the text is in the English translation, and the Gloria is sung at the end of the service according to the liturgy of the Book of Common Prayer.

== Composition ==
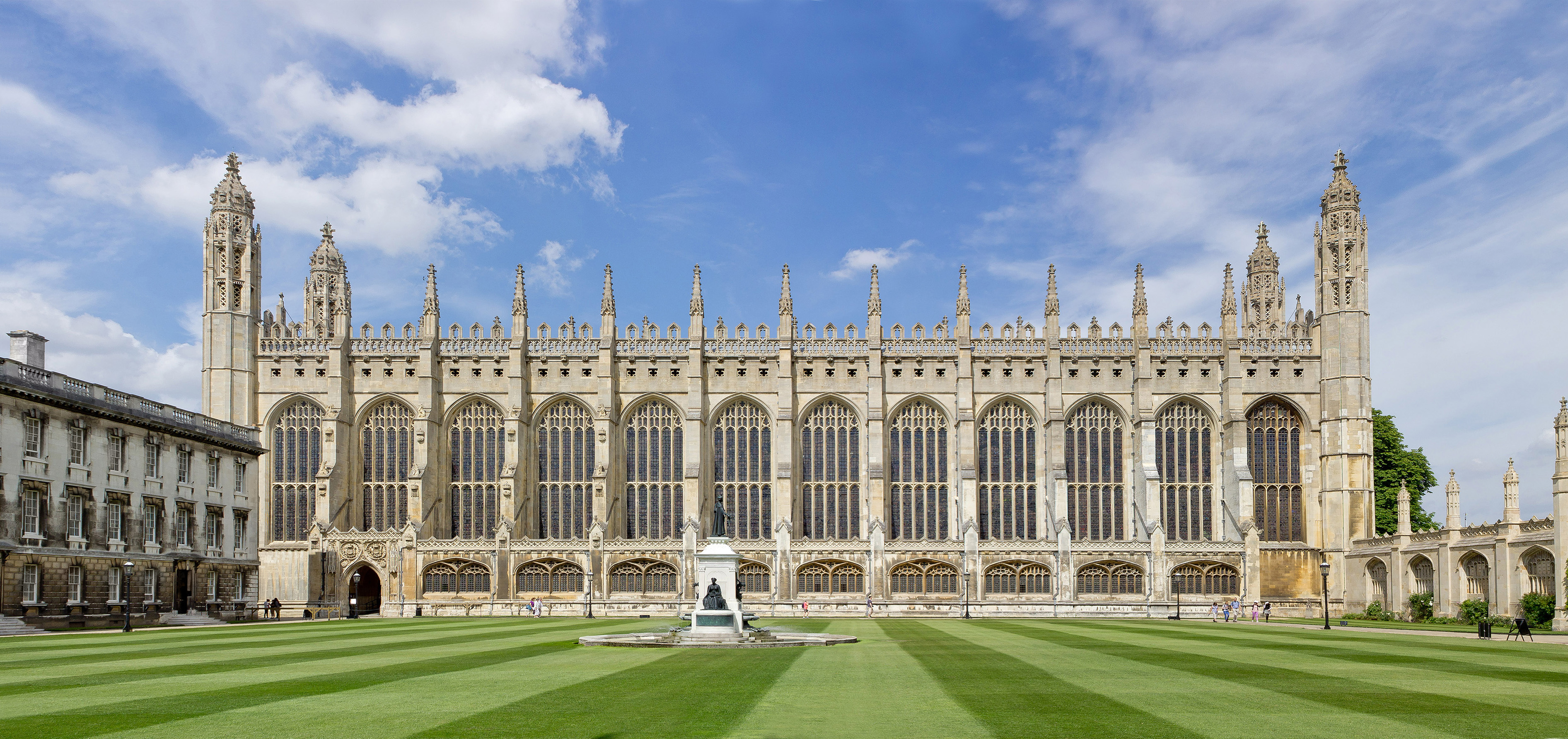
Collegium Regale was dedicated to Kings College King's College, Cambridge (pictured: the chapel)

In 1941, Howells took the post of acting organist of St John's College, Cambridge, standing in for Robin Orr who was away on active service in World War II. Howells attended a tea party held by Eric Milner-White, then Dean of King's College. There, he also met the Director of Music at King's, Boris Ord, and the organist of Gonville and Caius College, Patrick Hadley. The three men challenged Howells to a bet of one guinea that he could not compose a canticle setting for the Choir of King's College Chapel. Howells successfully produced a setting of the Te Deum; he later remarked that it was "the only Te Deum to be born of a decanal bet".

Following the challenge made at the Deanery tea, other settings followed: the Jubilate for Mattins in 1944, and in 1945 he completed the Magnificat and Nunc dimittis for Choral evensong. He revisited the music in 1956 for his setting of the Office of the Holy Communion (Collegium Regale). Praising the Collegium Regale settings, Paul Spicer, a pupil of Howells, has stated that "one guinea kickstarted music for the Anglican Church into a whole new phase of existence".

Howells's Collegium Regale evening canticles are among his best-known works and noted for their use of choral voices. While many Anglican settings of the Magnificat begin with full choir or male voices, Howells opens the work with mezzo-piano treble voices, emphasising the feminine voice of Mary's song. Correspondingly, the words of Simeon in the Nunc dimittis are initially conveyed by a solo tenor voice. Explaining his choice of voices, Howells stated that "… if I made a setting of the Magnificat, the mighty should be put down from their seat without a brute force which would deny this canticle’s feminine association. Equally, that in the Nunc dimittis, the tenor’s domination should characterize the gentle Simeon. Only the Gloria should raise its voice."

== Recordings ==
- A Celebration Of Herbert Howells — The Choir of King's College, Cambridge, Stephen Cleobury (Argo, 1992)
- Howells: Requiem, Take Him, Earth, For Cherishing (And Other Choral Works), Choir Of St John's College, Cambridge, Christopher Robinson, Iain Farrington (Naxos, 1999)

== See also ==
- List of compositions by Herbert Howells
