= Herbert Howells =

English composer, organist and teacher (1892–1983)

Herbert Howells CH CBE
- Born: 17 October 1892; Lydney, Gloucestershire, England
- Died: 23 February 1983 (aged 90); Putney, London, England
- Occupations: Composer; organist; music teacher
- Spouse: Dorothy Dawe
- Children: 2, including Ursula

Herbert Norman Howells CH CBE (17 October 1892 – 23 February 1983) was an English composer, organist, and teacher, most famous for his large output of Anglican church music.

== Life ==
=== Background and early education ===
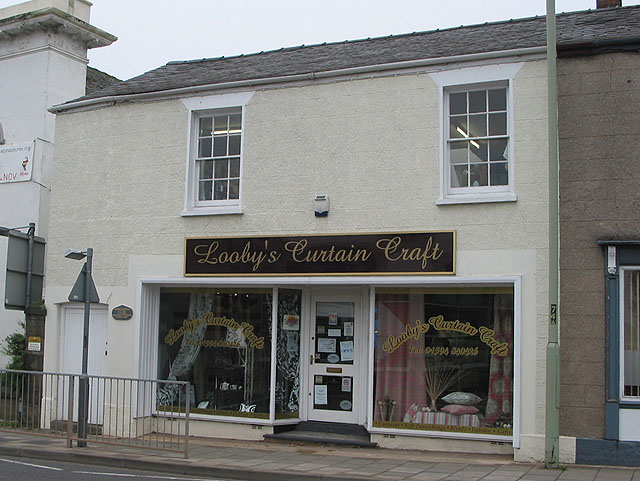
Birthplace of Herbert Howells on High Street, Lydney, Gloucestershire

Howells was born in Lydney, Gloucestershire, the youngest of six children of Oliver Howells, a plumber, painter, decorator and builder, and his wife Elizabeth. His father played the organ at the local Baptist church, and Herbert showed early musical promise, first deputising for his father, and then moving at the age of eleven to the local Church of England parish church as choirboy and unofficial deputy organist.

The Howells family's precarious financial situation came to a head when Oliver filed for bankruptcy in September 1904, when Herbert was nearly 12. This was a deep humiliation in a small community at the time and one from which Howells never fully recovered. Financially assisted by a member of the family of Charles Bathurst, 1st Viscount Bledisloe, who had taken an interest in the budding musician, Howells began music lessons in 1905 with Herbert Brewer, the organist of Gloucester Cathedral, and at sixteen became his articled pupil at the Cathedral alongside Ivor Novello and Ivor Gurney. Howells and Gurney became close friends, going on long walks through the Gloucestershire countryside discussing their shared love of music and English literature.

Another formative experience for the young Howells was the premiere in September 1910 at the Gloucester Three Choirs Festival of Ralph Vaughan Williams' Fantasia on a Theme by Thomas Tallis. Howells related in later years how Vaughan Williams sat next to him for the remainder of the concert and shared his score of Edward Elgar's The Dream of Gerontius with the awestruck aspiring composer. Both Vaughan Williams and the Tudor composers (including Tallis) profoundly influenced Howells' work.

=== Study at the Royal College of Music ===
In 1912, following the example of Ivor Gurney, Howells moved to London to study at the Royal College of Music, where his teachers included Charles Villiers Stanford, Hubert Parry and Charles Wood. Among Howells' contemporaries in the student body were Gurney, Arthur Bliss and Arthur Benjamin.

Howells blossomed in what he considered the "cosy family" atmosphere of the College, and his Mass in the Dorian Mode was performed at Westminster Cathedral under R. R. Terry within weeks of his arrival. For the most part, however, his music at this time was orchestral: works included a piano concerto, withdrawn after its first performance; a light orchestral suite, The B's, portraying three of his friends at the college (Arthur Bliss, Arthur Benjamin, and Francis Purcell "Bunny" Warren); and the Three Dances for violin and orchestra. More typical of the works with which Howells was later associated were his earliest important compositions for organ, the first set of Psalm Preludes (1915–16) and the first of the op. 17 Rhapsodies.

In 1915, Howells was diagnosed with Graves' disease and given six months to live. His poor health prevented him from being conscripted in World War I. At St Thomas' Hospital he was given the previously untried radium injections in the neck, administered twice a week over a period of two years. For much of this time Howells travelled between London for treatment and Lydney where he was nursed by his mother. He was nonetheless still able to compose and in 1916 produced the first work of his maturity. The Piano Quartet in A minor, dedicated to "the hill at Chosen and Ivor Gurney who knows it" was in the following year one of the first works published under the auspices of the Carnegie United Kingdom Trust. The quartet was first played at the home of Marion M. Scott on 13 July 1916, the players being Nancy Phillips, Sybil Maturin, Dorothy Thuell and George Ball, who afterwards played it at the RCM. Its first public performance took place at Oxford in November 1917. In the following year Howells became assistant organist at Salisbury Cathedral, but held the post for only a few months, finding the repeated journeys to London for treatment too difficult. Friends then arranged for a grant from the Carnegie Trust, which paid for Howells to assist R. R. Terry in editing the Latin Tudor repertoire that Terry and his choir were reviving at Westminster Cathedral. The work was to lead to a multi-volume edition of Tudor Church Music by Oxford University Press in the 1920s. It provided Howells with a comfortable income and enabled him to absorb the English Renaissance style which he loved and would evoke in his own music. His first significant works for choir, the Three Carol-Anthems (Here is the Little Door, A Spotless Rose and Sing Lullaby) were written around this time.

=== Marriage and teaching ===
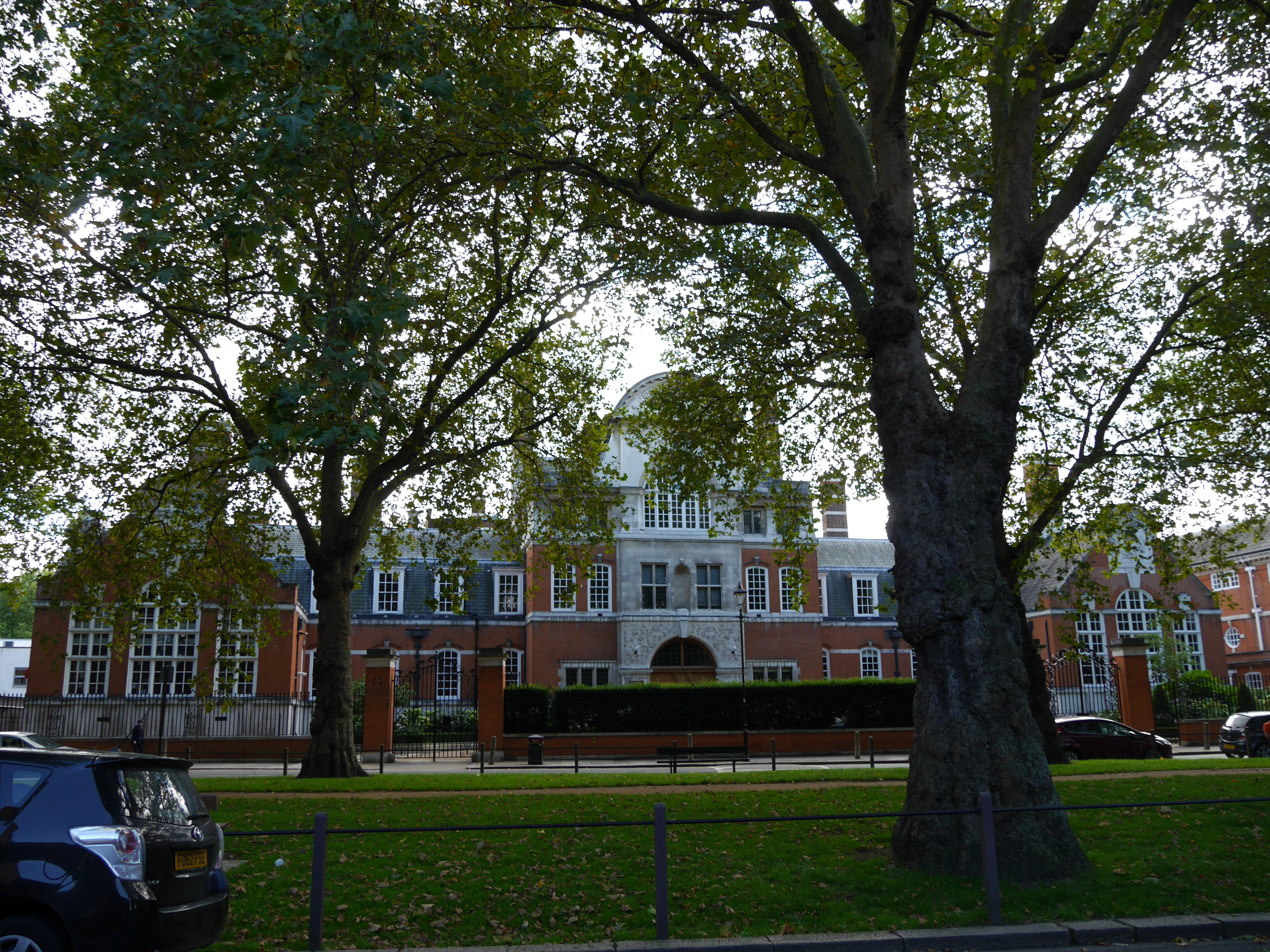
St Paul's Girls' School, Brook Green, London

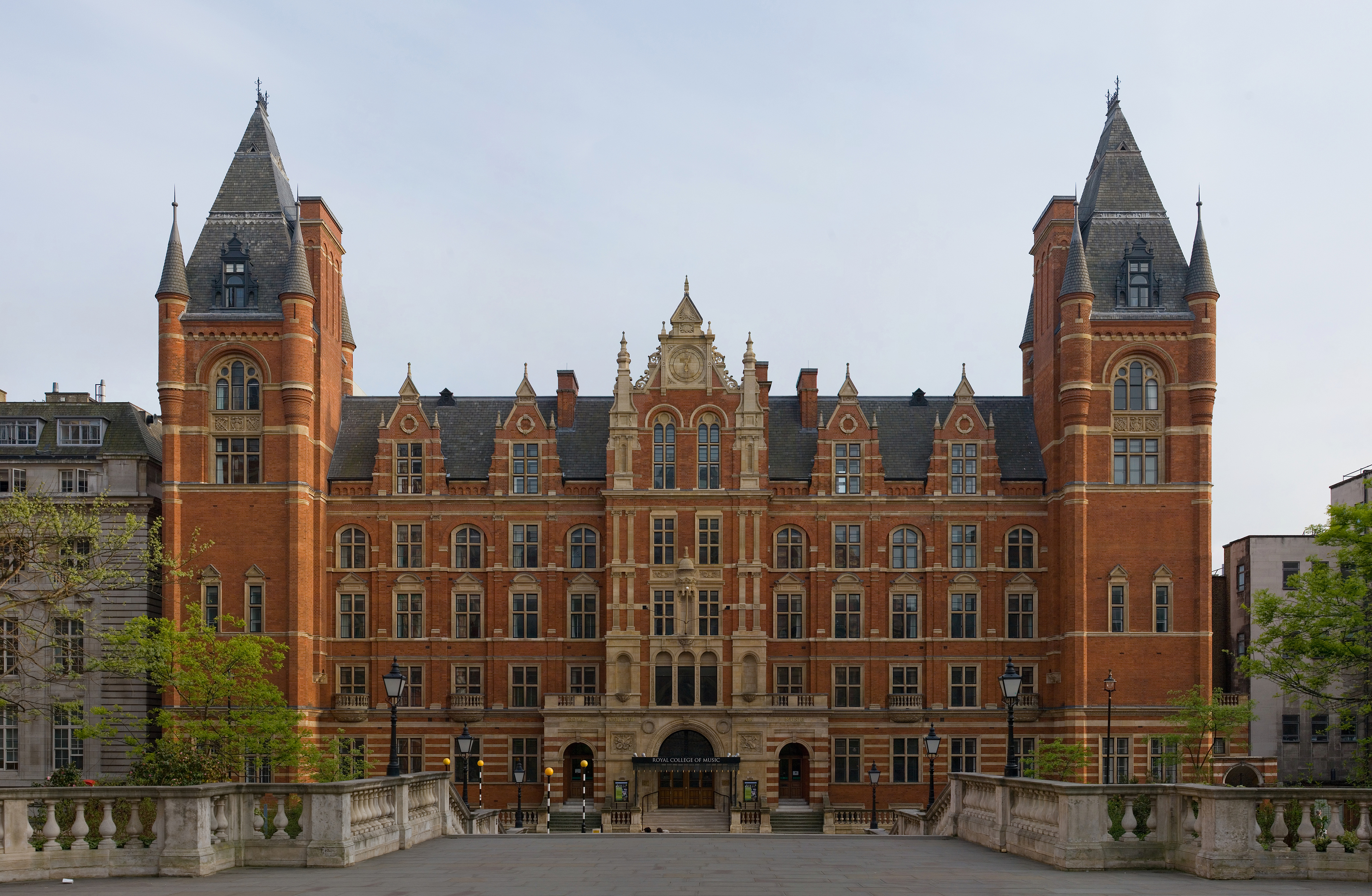
Royal College of Music, Kensington, London

In 1920 Howells married Dorothy Eveline Goozee, informally adopted daughter of John and Alma Dawe. Dorothy was a singer whom he had met in 1911 when deputising as her accompanist. The marriage endured despite Howells' frequent infidelities, and produced two children, Ursula (1922–2005), later an actress, and Michael (1926–1935).

In the same year he joined the staff of the Royal College of Music, where he was to remain until 1979. Among his pupils were Robert Simpson, Gordon Jacob, James Bernard, Paul Spicer, Madeleine Dring, and Imogen Holst. The post at the RCM, which from 1925 he combined with the position of Director of Music at St Paul's Girls' School, and frequent work as a competition adjudicator, was to reduce the amount of time he could devote to composition; but he continued to write orchestral and chamber music, including the string quartet In Gloucestershire (originally written 1916, but rewritten in whole or in part several times and not reaching its final form until the 1930s), the overture Merry Eye (1920) and the second Piano Concerto (1925). The first performance of the last named work occasioned a demonstration in the concert hall from a hostile critic. Howells, always over-sensitive to criticism, withdrew the work and produced few significant compositions for several years. Howells' friend and fellow composer, Martin Sumpter, encouraged this temporary hiatus from composing large-scale works. One exception was Lambert's Clavichord (1928), a rare example of a composition by a 20th-century composer for that instrument. It was inspired by a clavichord lent to Howells by his friend Herbert Lambert, an instrument maker and photographer based in Bath. Several other major compositions written around this time, however, remained unperformed, notably an a cappella Requiem to English words written in 1932, and a choral work, A Kent Yeoman's Wooing Song, written the following year.

=== Family tragedy and the war ===
In September 1935 Howells' nine-year-old son Michael contracted polio during a family holiday, dying in London three days later. Michael was buried in the churchyard of St Matthew's Church in Twigworth, Gloucestershire.

Howells was deeply affected and continued to commemorate the event until the end of his life. At the suggestion of his daughter Ursula he sought to channel his grief into music, and over the next three years composed much of the large-scale choral work which was eventually to become Hymnus Paradisi, drawing on material from the still unpublished Requiem of 1932. This remained, in Howells' words, "a personal, almost secret document" until 1950. Other commemorative works written around this time include the Concerto for Strings (written in 1938), the slow movement of which is in joint memory of Michael and Edward Elgar, and the unfinished Cello Concerto, on which Howells had been working at the time of the boy's death and which he found himself unable to complete. A Sequence for St Michael and the motet Take Him, Earth, for Cherishing have also been associated with Howells's grief for Michael, as have two of Howells's hymn tunes, the best-known of which is his tune for the hymn "All My Hope on God is Founded" by Robert Bridges ("A Hymn Tune for Charterhouse"), which was renamed Michael for its publication in The Clarendon Hymn Book in 1936. Howells also wrote the tune Twigworth (1968) for the hymn "God is love, let heaven adore him". To a greater or lesser extent, however, much of Howells' subsequent music shows the influence of this loss.

From the late 1930s, Howells turned increasingly to choral and organ music, composing a second series of Psalm Preludes followed by a set of Six Pieces (begun 1939), of which the third, Master Tallis's Testament, a particular favourite of the composer's, recalled his formative experience of Vaughan Williams' Tallis Fantasia. A set of Four Anthems, originally titled In Time of War and including the popular O Pray for the Peace of Jerusalem and Like as the Hart, followed in early 1941. In August of that year, Howells was invited to serve as acting organist of St John's College, Cambridge, replacing Robin Orr who was away on active service in World War II. Howells' association with Cambridge, which lasted until the end of the war in 1945, was a productive and happy period for him, and led directly to the works for which he is most remembered. He later recalled being challenged by the Dean of King's College, Eric Milner-White, to write a set of canticles for the choir. The result was the Te Deum and Jubilate of the service known as Collegium Regale, performed in 1944, followed the next year by the Magnificat and Nunc Dimittis, and completed in 1956 by the Office of Holy Communion. Collegium Regale, the Gloucester Service (for Gloucester Cathedral, 1946) and the St Paul's Service (for St Paul's Cathedral, 1951) remain the best known and most admired of the many settings of the Anglican liturgy written by Howells for particular choirs and buildings over the next thirty years.

=== Hymnus Paradisi and after ===
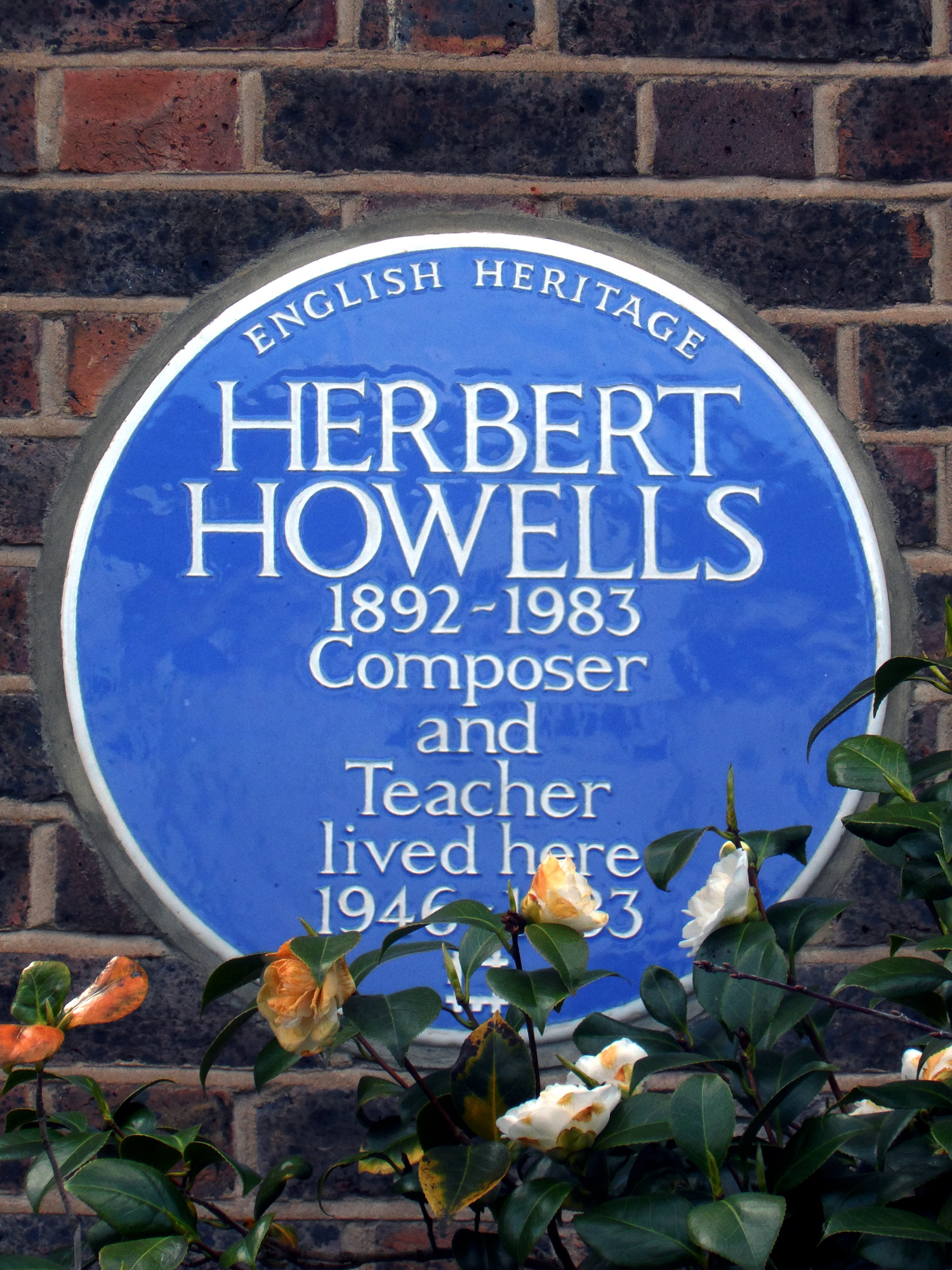
Blue plaque commemorating the residence 1946–1983 of Howells at 3 Beverley Close, in Barnes, London

In 1949, the organist Herbert Sumsion asked Howells if he had anything that could be performed at the 1950 Three Choirs Festival to be held at Gloucester. Howells decided to bring out the incomplete choral work he had written in his son Michael's memory between 1936 and 1938. (In later years Howells claimed it was at the urging of Vaughan Williams that the piece was disinterred). The work, retitled Hymnus Paradisi at Sumsion's suggestion, was completed and orchestrated in time for its first performance on 7 September 1950, the day after the 15th anniversary of Michael's death. It was Howells' greatest public and critical success, and for many years was his best known work. Shorter choral works written around this time include the carol-anthem Long long ago (1951), the introit Behold O God our Defender for the coronation of Queen Elizabeth II in 1953, and The House of the Mind (1954) for chorus and strings.

Though not an orthodox Christian, Howells was chiefly identified with the composition of religious music. His follow-up work to the Hymnus Paradisi was an extended setting of the Latin Mass for soloists, chorus and orchestra, named Missa Sabrinensis after the River Severn and first performed in Worcester Cathedral as part of the Three Choirs Festival in 1954. It was considered a disappointment after the success of the earlier work, and its extreme complexity and difficulty has prevented it becoming widely known. Howells followed it with An English Mass (1956), a smaller-scale setting to English words for chorus, strings and organ. His final large-scale choral work was the Stabat Mater, setting a text whose subsidiary theme of a parent mourning a child had obvious personal significance. He began it in 1959 but found it difficult to complete; it was not performed until 1965. The motet Take Him, Earth, For Cherishing, a posthumous tribute to President John F. Kennedy, was written in late spring of 1964. It premiered as part of a 22 November 1964 Canadian tribute to Kennedy at Washington's National Gallery of Art sung by the Choir of St George's Cathedral, Kingston, Ontario, Canada, under the direction of George N. Maybee. Maybee brought the St George's choir to England in September 1965, and they performed the piece at King's College, Cambridge with Howells in attendance. Take Him, Earth is described by Howells' pupil Paul Spicer as "a classic of twentieth century choral music" and "an undoubted masterpiece".

Howells continued to compose until his late 80s, but wrote nothing further on the scale of the Stabat Mater. One of the last works to appear in his lifetime was the Requiem, edited for performance from his manuscripts in 1980 and published the following year, almost fifty years after its composition. He died on 23 February 1983 at the age of 90, in a nursing home in Putney, one day after his good friend Sir Adrian Boult, and his ashes were interred in Westminster Abbey.

== Honours and legacy ==
Howells was appointed Commander of the Order of the British Empire in 1953 and Member of the Order of the Companions of Honour in 1972. His academic awards included an honorary doctorate from the University of Cambridge, awarded in 1961. A "Herbert Howells Society", started by his daughter Ursula in 1987, and a "Herbert Howells Trust", founded after her death in 2005, exist to promote his works.

There are several portraits of Howells. A 1974 oil painting by Leonard Boden hangs in the collection of the Royal College of Music, and in the National Portrait Gallery, London there is a chalk sketch by Boden, an oil portrait by Howard James Morgan and photographic portraits by Herbert Lambert, Clive Barda and Elliott & Fry. The cellist Julian Lloyd Webber was Howells' godson.

== Compositions ==
Howells composed a range of orchestral, choral and chamber works. He is best known for his sacred choral music, notably his settings of services for Mattins (morning service with Te Deum, Benedictus and Jubilate) and choral Evensong (evening service with Magnificat and Nunc Dimittis), many of which are dedicated to specific places of worship such as Gloucester Cathedral (Gloucester Service), King's College, Cambridge (Collegium Regale) and St Paul's Cathedral (St Paul's Service) He also composed several hymn tunes and a Requiem.
