= Magnificat =

Scriptural hymn of Mary in the Christian tradition

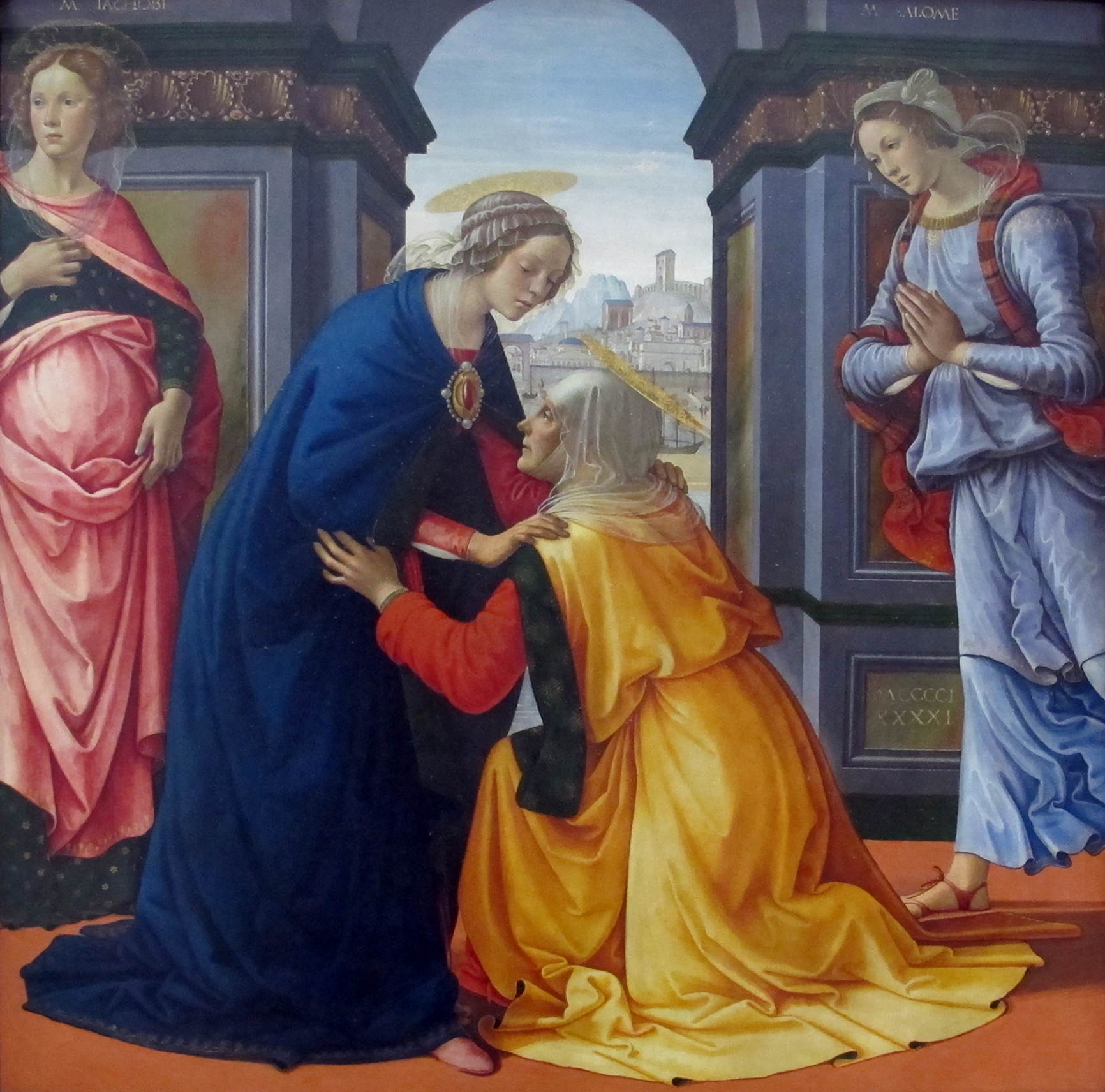
Visitation, by Domenico Ghirlandaio (1491), depicts Mary visiting her elderly cousin Elizabeth.

The Magnificat (Latin for "[My soul] magnifies [the Lord]") is a canticle, also known as the Song of Mary or Canticle of Mary, and in the Byzantine Rite as the Ode of the Theotokos (Greek: Ἡ ᾨδὴ τῆς Θεοτόκου). Its Western name derives from the incipit of its Latin text. The most popular canticle, it is used within the liturgies of the Catholic Church, the Eastern Orthodox Church, the Lutheran Church and the Anglican Communion.

The text of the canticle is taken from the Gospel of Luke (1:46–55) where it is spoken by Mary upon the occasion of her Visitation to her cousin Elizabeth. In the narrative, after Mary greets Elizabeth, who is pregnant with John the Baptist, the latter moves within Elizabeth's womb. Elizabeth praises Mary for her faith (using words partially reflected in the Hail Mary), and Mary responds with what is now known as the Magnificat. Some ancient authorities have Elizabeth, rather than Mary, speaking the Magnificat.

The Magnificat is one of the eight most ancient Christian hymns and perhaps the earliest Marian hymn. Within the whole of Christianity, the canticle is most frequently recited within the Liturgy of the Hours. In Western Christianity, the Magnificat is most often sung or recited during the main evening prayer service: Vespers in the Catholic and Lutheran churches, and Evening Prayer (or Evensong) in Anglicanism. The traditional form is found the Book of Common Prayer (1662) and in Common Worship, as well as the Book of Common Prayer (1928) and Book of Common Prayer (1979) of the Episcopal Church (United States). In Eastern Christianity, the Magnificat is always sung at Matins. The Magnificat may also be sung during worship services, especially in the Advent season during which these verses are traditionally read.

== Context ==
Mary's Magnificat, recorded only in Luke's Gospel, is one of four hymns, distilled from a collection of early Jewish-Christian canticles, which complement the promise-fulfillment theme of Luke's infancy narrative. These songs are Mary's Magnificat; Zechariah's Benedictus (1:67–79); the angels' Gloria in Excelsis Deo (2:13–14); and Simeon's Nunc dimittis (2:28–32). In form and content, these four canticles are patterned on the "hymns of praise" in Israel's Psalter. In structure, these songs reflect the compositions of pre-Christian contemporary Jewish hymnology. The first stanza displays graphically a characteristic feature of Hebrew poetry—synonymous parallelism—in ascribing praise to God: "my soul" mirrors "my spirit"; "proclaims the greatness" with "has found gladness"; "of the Lord" with "in God my Savior". The balance of the opening two lines bursts out into a dual Magnificat of declaring the greatness of and finding delight in God. The third stanza again demonstrates parallelism, but in this instance, three contrasting parallels: the proud are reversed by the low estate, the mighty by those of low degree, and the rich by the hungry.

Although there is some scholarly discussion of whether the historical Mary herself actually proclaimed this canticle, Luke portrays her as the singer of this song of reversals and the interpreter of the contemporary events taking place. Mary symbolizes both ancient Israel and the Lucan faith-community as the author/singer of the Magnificat. In modern scholarship, the thoery that Elizabeth was the original speaker of the Magnificat was first proposed by Alfred Loisy in 1893 and subsequently advanced by Adolf von Harnack in 1900. Harnack argued that Luke 1:46 should be read as "And Elizabeth said ..." in accordance with several ancient readings. Jeffrey Kloha notes that "few commentaries and no editions of the Greek New Testament produced in the last half-century concur with his judgment", although he maintains there is a case for accepting the attribution to Elizabeth.

The canticle echoes several biblical passages, but the most pronounced allusions are to the Song of Hannah, from the Books of Samuel (1 Samuel 2:1–10). Scriptural echoes from the Torah, the Prophets, and the Writings complement the main allusions to Hannah's "magnificat of rejoicing". Along with the Benedictus, as well as several Old Testament canticles, the Magnificat is included in the Book of Odes, an ancient liturgical collection found in some manuscripts of the Septuagint.

As with other canticles and psalms, Western liturgical tradition usually adds the doxology known as Gloria Patri to the end of the Magnificat. This is not found in the original text.

== Structure ==
In a style reminiscent of Old Testament poetry and song, Mary praises the Lord in alignment with this structure:

1. Mary rejoices that she has the privilege of giving birth to the promised Messiah (Luke 1:46–48).
2. She glorifies God for His power, holiness, and mercy (Luke 1:49–50).
3. Mary looks forward to God transforming the world through the Messiah. The proud will be brought low, and the humble will be lifted up; the hungry will be fed, and the rich will go without (Luke 1:51–53).
4. Mary exalts God because He has been faithful to His promise to Abraham (Luke 1:54–55; see God's promise to Abraham in Gen 12:1–3).

== Text ==
=== Latin and Anglican translation ===
Vulgate	Book of Common Prayer (1662)
Magnificat anima mea Dominum; et exsultavit spiritus meus in Deo salutari meo, quia respexit humilitatem ancillæ suæ; Ecce enim ex hoc beatam me dicent omnes generationes. quia fecit mihi magna, qui potens est, et sanctum nomen eius. Et misericordia eius a progenie in progenies timentibus eum. Fecit potentiam in brachio suo; dispersit superbos mente cordis sui; deposuit potentes de sede, et exaltavit humiles; esurientes implevit bonis et divites dimisit inanes. Suscepit Israel puerum suum, recordatus misericordiæ suæ, sicut locutus est ad patres nostros, Abraham et semini eius in sæcula. The Gloria Patri is appended to the canticle but is not part of Luke's Gospel. Gloria Patri, et Filio, et Spiritui Sancto, sicut erat in principio, et nunc, et semper: et in Sæcula sæculorum. Amen.	My soul doth magnify the Lord. And my spirit hath rejoiced in God my Saviour. For he hath regarded: the lowliness of his handmaiden: For behold, from henceforth: all generations shall call me blessed. For he that is mighty hath magnified me: and holy is his Name. And his mercy is on them that fear him: throughout all generations. He hath shewed strength with his arm: he hath scattered the proud in the imagination of their hearts. He hath put down the mighty from their seat: and hath exalted the humble and meek. He hath filled the hungry with good things: and the rich he hath sent empty away. He remembering his mercy hath holpen his servant Israel: As he promised to our forefathers, Abraham and his seed for ever. The Gloria Patri is appended to the canticle, but is not part of Luke's Gospel. Glory be to the Father, and to the Son: and to the Holy Ghost; As it was in the beginning, is now, and ever shall be: world without end. Amen.

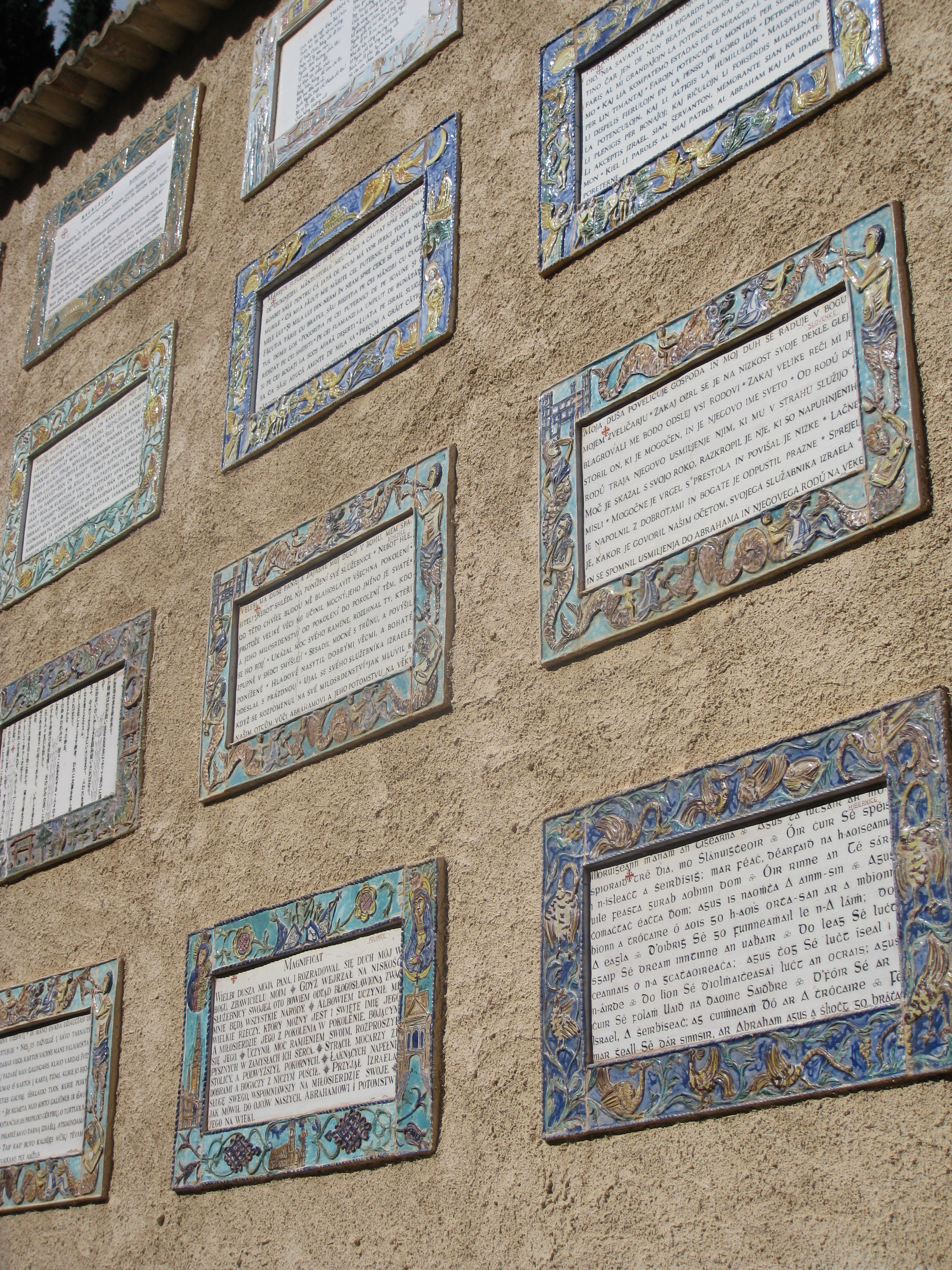
Translations of the Magnificat into various languages at the Church of the Visitation in Ein Karem

=== Catholic translation ===
Traditional

My soul doth magnify the Lord,
And my spirit hath rejoiced in God my Saviour
Because He hath regarded the humility of his handmaid: for behold from henceforth all generations shall call me blessed.
Because He that is mighty hath done great things to me, and holy is His name.
And His mercy is from generation unto generations to them that fear Him.
He hath shewed might in His arm: He hath scattered the proud in the conceit of their heart.
He hath put down the mighty from their seat, and hath exalted the humble.
He hath filled the hungry with good things, and the rich He hath sent empty away.
He hath received Israel His servant, being mindful of His mercy.
As He spoke to our fathers; to Abraham and his seed forever.

Glory be to the Father, and to the Son, and to the Holy Spirit,
As it was in the beginning is now, and ever shall be, world without end. Amen.

Modern

My soul proclaims the greatness of the Lord,
my spirit rejoices in God my Savior,
for He has looked with favor on His humble servant.

From this day all generations will call me blessed,
the Almighty has done great things for me,
and holy is His Name.

He has mercy on those who fear Him
in every generation.

He has shown the strength of his arm,
He has scattered the proud in their conceit.

He has cast down the mighty from their thrones,
and has lifted up the humble.

He has filled the hungry with good things,
and the rich He has sent away empty.

He has come to the help of His servant Israel
for He has remembered his promise of mercy,
the promise He made to our fathers,
to Abraham and his children for ever.

Glory to the Father, and to the Son, and to the Holy Spirit,
as it was in the beginning, is now, and will be for ever.
Amen, Alleluia.

=== Greek ===
The oldest (likely original) version of the Magnificat was written in Koine Greek.

Μεγαλύνει ἡ ψυχή μου τὸν Κύριον καὶ ἠγαλλίασεν τὸ πνεῦμά μου ἐπὶ τῷ Θεῷ τῷ σωτῆρί μου,
ὅτι ἐπέβλεψεν ἐπὶ τὴν ταπείνωσιν τῆς δούλης αὐτοῦ. ἰδοὺ γὰρ ἀπὸ τοῦ νῦν μακαριοῦσίν με πᾶσαι αἱ γενεαί,
ὅτι ἐποίησέν μοι μεγάλα ὁ δυνατός, καὶ ἅγιον τὸ ὄνομα αὐτοῦ, καὶ τὸ ἔλεος αὐτοῦ εἰς γενεὰς καὶ γενεὰς τοῖς φοβουμένοις αὐτόν.
Ἐποίησεν κράτος ἐν βραχίονι αὐτοῦ, διεσκόρπισεν ὑπερηφάνους διανοίᾳ καρδίας αὐτῶν·
καθεῖλεν δυνάστας ἀπὸ θρόνων καὶ ὕψωσεν ταπεινούς, πεινῶντας ἐνέπλησεν ἀγαθῶν καὶ πλουτοῦντας ἐξαπέστειλεν κενούς.
ἀντελάβετο Ἰσραὴλ παιδὸς αὐτοῦ, μνησθῆναι ἐλέους, καθὼς ἐλάλησεν πρὸς τοὺς πατέρας ἡμῶν τῷ Αβραὰμ καὶ τῷ σπέρματι αὐτοῦ εἰς τὸν αἰῶνα.

In Eastern Orthodox worship, the Ode of the Theotokos is accompanied by the following refrain sung between the verses (a sticheron) and a megalynarion, which is the second part of the Axion Estin hymn:

Τὴν τιμιωτέραν τῶν Χερουβὶμ καὶ ἐνδοξοτέραν ἀσυγκρίτως τῶν Σεραφίμ, τὴν ἀδιαφθόρως Θεὸν Λόγον τεκοῦσαν, τὴν ὄντως Θεοτόκον, σὲ μεγαλύνομεν.
('You who are more to be honoured than the Cherubim and incomparably more glorious than the Seraphim, you who, uncorrupted, gave birth to God the Word, in reality the God-bearer, we exalt you.')

Amharic

In the Oriental Orthodox Scripture of Ethiopia according to the Ye' Luqas Wongel, Gospel of Luqas (Luke):

46፤ ማርያምም እንዲህ አለች።

47፤ ነፍሴ ጌታን ታከብረዋለች፥ መንፈሴም በአምላኬ በመድኃኒቴ ሐሴት ታደርጋለች፤

48፤ የባሪያይቱን ውርደት ተመልክቶአልና። እነሆም፥ ከዛሬ ጀምሮ ትውልድ ሁሉ ብፅዕት ይሉኛል፤

49፤ ብርቱ የሆነ እርሱ በእኔ ታላቅ ሥራ አድርጎአልና፤ ስሙም ቅዱስ ነው።

50፤ ምሕረቱም ለሚፈሩት እስከ ትውልድና ትውልድ ይኖራል።

51፤ በክንዱ ኃይል አድርጎአል፤ ትዕቢተኞችን በልባቸው አሳብ በትኖአል፤

52፤ ገዥዎችን ከዙፋናቸው አዋርዶአል፤ ትሑታንንም ከፍ አድርጎአል፤

53፤ የተራቡትን በበጎ ነገር አጥግቦአል፤ ባለ ጠጎችንም ባዶአቸውን ሰዶአቸዋል።

54-55፤ ለአባቶቻችን እንደ ተናገረ፥ ለአብርሃምና ለዘሩ ለዘላለም ምሕረቱ ትዝ እያለው እስራኤልን ብላቴናውን ረድቶአል።

=== Slavonic ===
The translation of the hymn into Church Slavonic is as follows:

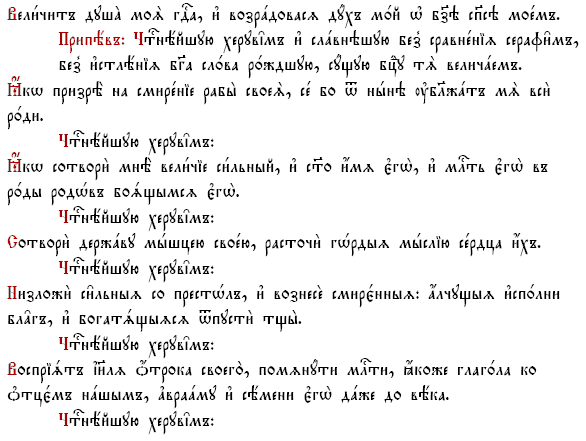

In modern Cyrillic (Russian) :

величит душа Моя Господа,
и возрадовася дух Мой о Бозе Спасе Моем:
яко призре на смирение Рабы Своея: се бо, отныне ублажат Мя вси роди:
яко сотвори Мне величие Сильный, и свято имя Его:
и милость Его в роды родов боящымся Его:
сотвори державу мышцею Своею: расточи гордыя мыслию сердца их:
Низложи сильныя со престол, и вознесе смиренныя:
алчущыя исполни благ и богатящыяся отпусти тщы:
восприят Израиля отрока Своего, помянути милости,
якоже глагола ко отцем нашым, Аврааму и семени его до века.

== Liturgical use ==
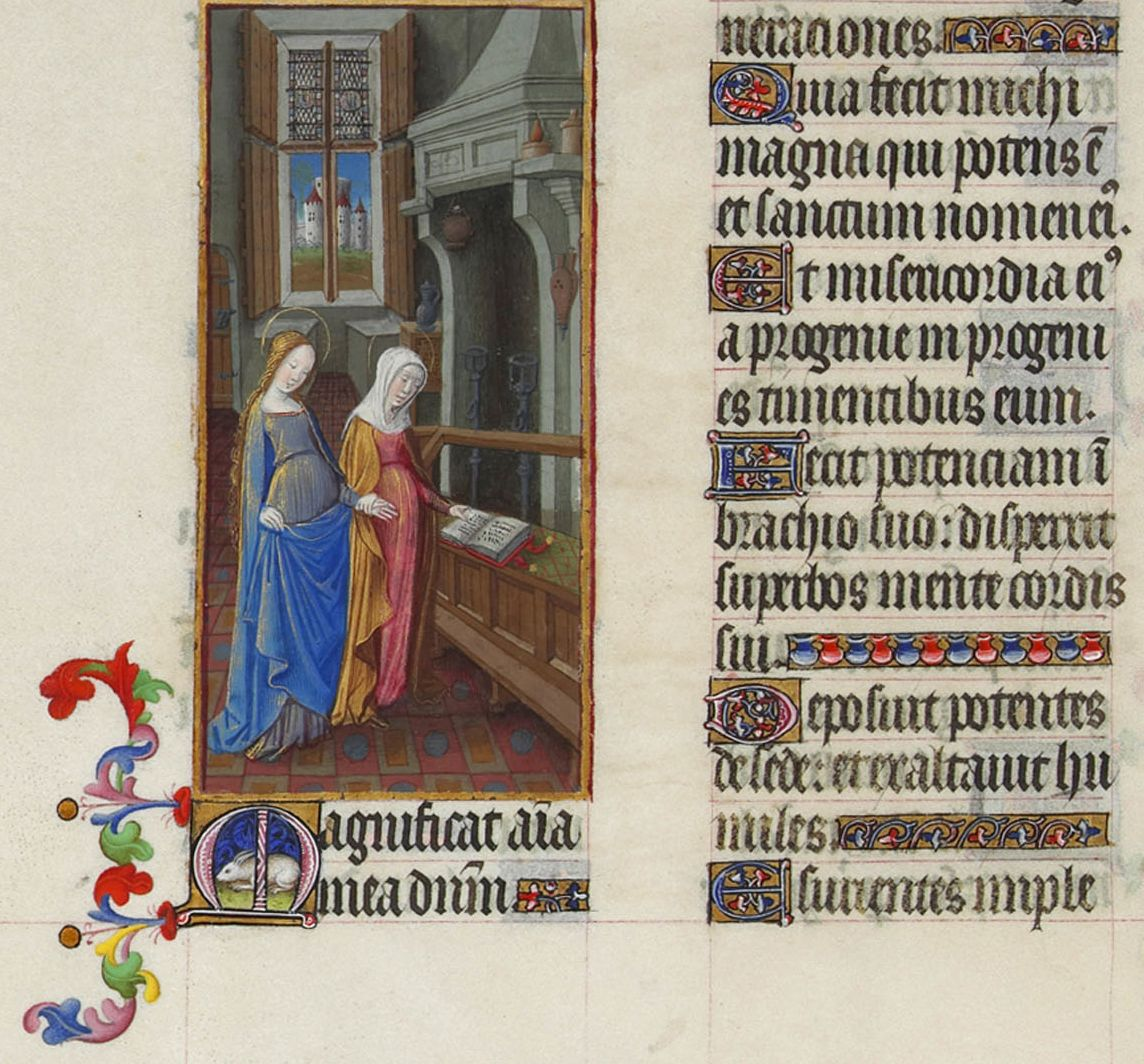
The Visitation in the Book of Hours of the Duc de Berry; the Magnificat in Latin

The text forms a part of the daily office in the Catholic Vespers service, the Lutheran Vespers service, and the Anglican services of Evening Prayer, according to both the Book of Common Prayer and Common Worship. In the Book of Common Prayer Evening Prayer service, it is usually paired with the Nunc dimittis. The Book of Common Prayer allows for an alternative to the Magnificat—the Cantate Domino, Psalm 98—and some Anglican rubrics allow for a wider selection of canticles, but the Magnificat and Nunc dimittis remain the most popular. In Anglican, Lutheran, and Catholic services, the Magnificat is generally followed by the Gloria Patri. It is also commonly used among Lutherans at the Feast of the Visitation (July 2).

In Eastern Orthodox liturgical practice, the Magnificat is always sung during the Matins service before the Irmos of the ninth ode of the canon (except on greater feasts of the Lord or the Theotokos, where the magnificat is excluded completely). After each biblical verse, i.e. as a sticheron, the following megalynarion or troparion is sung:

More honourable than the Cherubim, and more glorious beyond compare than the Seraphim, without corruption thou gavest birth to God the Word: true Theotokos, we magnify thee.

As a canticle, the Magnificat has frequently been set to music. Most compositions were originally intended for liturgical use, especially for Vesper services and celebrations of the Visitation, but some are also performed in concert.

== Indulgence ==
In the Catholic Church, the Enchiridion Indulgentiarum of 2004 provides for partial indulgence.

== Musical settings ==
As the Magnificat is part of the sung Vespers, many composers, beginning in the Renaissance, set the words to music, for example Claudio Monteverdi in his Vespro della Beata Vergine (1610). Henry Dumont, André Campra (1713), Antoine-Esprit Blanchard (1741), Marc-Antoine Charpentier, 10 settings (H.72, H.73, H.74, H.75, H.76, H.77, H.78, H.79, H.80, H.81), François Giroust (12 settings), Vivaldi composed a setting of the Latin text for soloists, choir, and orchestra, as did Johann Sebastian Bach in his Magnificat (1723, rev. 1733). Other notable examples include C.P.E. Bach's Magnificat and two extant settings by Jan Dismas Zelenka (ZWV 106 is missing).

Anton Bruckner composed a Magnificat for soloists, choir, orchestra, and organ. Rachmaninoff and, more recently, John Rutter also composed a setting, inserting additions into the text.

Dieter Schnebel wrote a Magnificat in 1996/97 for small choir (schola), percussion and additional instruments ad libitum. Arvo Pärt composed a setting for choir a cappella. Kim André Arnesen's Magnificat for choir, strings, piano, and organ premiered in 2010. The Taizé Community have also composed an ostinato setting of the text.

Together with the Nunc dimittis, the Magnificat is a regular part of the Anglican Evensong. The "Mag and Nunc" has been set by many composers – such as Thomas Tallis, Ralph Vaughan Williams, Herbert Sumsion, Charles Wood and John Tavener – of Anglican church music, often for choir a cappella or choir and organ. Since the canticles are sung every day at some cathedrals, Charles Villiers Stanford wrote a Magnificat in every major key, and Herbert Howells published 18 settings over his career, including the Collegium Regale setting and the Magnificat and Nunc dimittis for St Paul's Cathedral.

An Eastern Orthodox setting of the Magnificat (text in Latin and English) is to be found in the 2011 All-night Vigil (Section 11) by the English composer Clive Strutt.

Maria Luise Thurmair wrote in 1954 the lyrics for a popular German ecumenical hymn based on the Magnificat, "Den Herren will ich loben", set to a 1613 melody by Melchior Teschner (that of Valet will ich dir geben). Timothy Dudley-Smith wrote "Tell Out, My Soul", a popular paraphrase of the Magnificat, in 1962. Krzysztof Penderecki composed an extended Magnificat for the 1200th anniversary of the Salzburg Cathedral in 1974, for bass soloist, men's and boys' voices, two mixed choirs and orchestra. Catholic composer Rory Cooney in 1990 published a hymn setting of the Magnificat called the "Canticle of the Turning", set to the Irish folk tune Star of the County Down.

The oratorio Laudato si' composed in 2016 by Peter Reulein on a libretto by Helmut Schlegel includes the full Latin text of the Magnificat, expanded by writings of Clare of Assisi, Francis of Assisi and Pope Francis.

== Society and politics ==
In Nicaragua, the Magnificat is a favorite prayer among many peasants and is often carried as a sacramental. During the Somoza years, campesinos were required to carry proof of having voted for Somoza; this document was mockingly referred to as a Magnificat.

During the British Raj, Anglican Archbishop William Temple joked to evangelist Jack Winslow, who was sympathetic to Indian independence, that singing the Magnificat would make him look even more like a revolutionary than wearing home-spun Indian clothing already did.

== See also ==
- 4Q521, one of the Dead Sea Scrolls
