= Nunc dimittis =

Passage from the Gospel of Luke

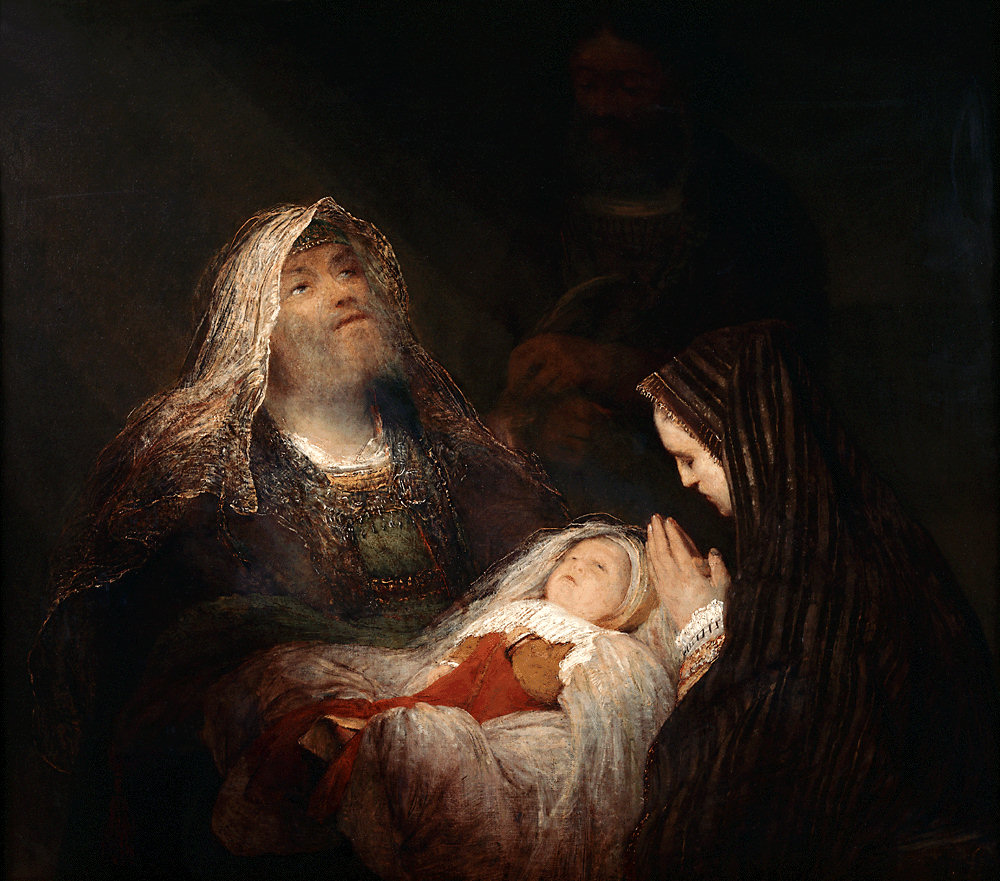
Simeon's Song of Praise by Aert de Gelder, c. 1700–1710

The Nunc dimittis (English: /nʊŋk dɪˈmɪtɪs/), also known as the Song of Simeon or the Canticle of Simeon, is a canticle taken from the second chapter of the Gospel of Luke, verses 29 to 32. Its Latin name comes from its incipit, the opening words, of the Vulgate translation of the passage, meaning "Now you let depart". Since the 4th century it has been used in Christian services of evening worship such as Compline, Vespers, and Evensong.

== Biblical account ==
The title is formed from the opening words in the Latin Vulgate, "Nunc dimittis servum tuum, Domine" ("Now thou dost dismiss thy servant, O Lord"). Although brief, the canticle abounds in Old Testament allusions. For example, "Because my eyes have seen thy salvation" alludes to Isaiah 52:10.

According to the narrative in Luke 2:25–32, Simeon was a devout Jew who had been promised by the Holy Spirit that he would not die until he had seen the Messiah. When Mary and Joseph presented the baby Jesus to the Temple in Jerusalem for the ceremony of redemption of the firstborn son (after the time of Mary's purification: at least 40 days after the birth, and thus distinct from the circumcision), Simeon was there. He took Jesus into his arms and uttered words rendered variously as follows:

== Versions ==
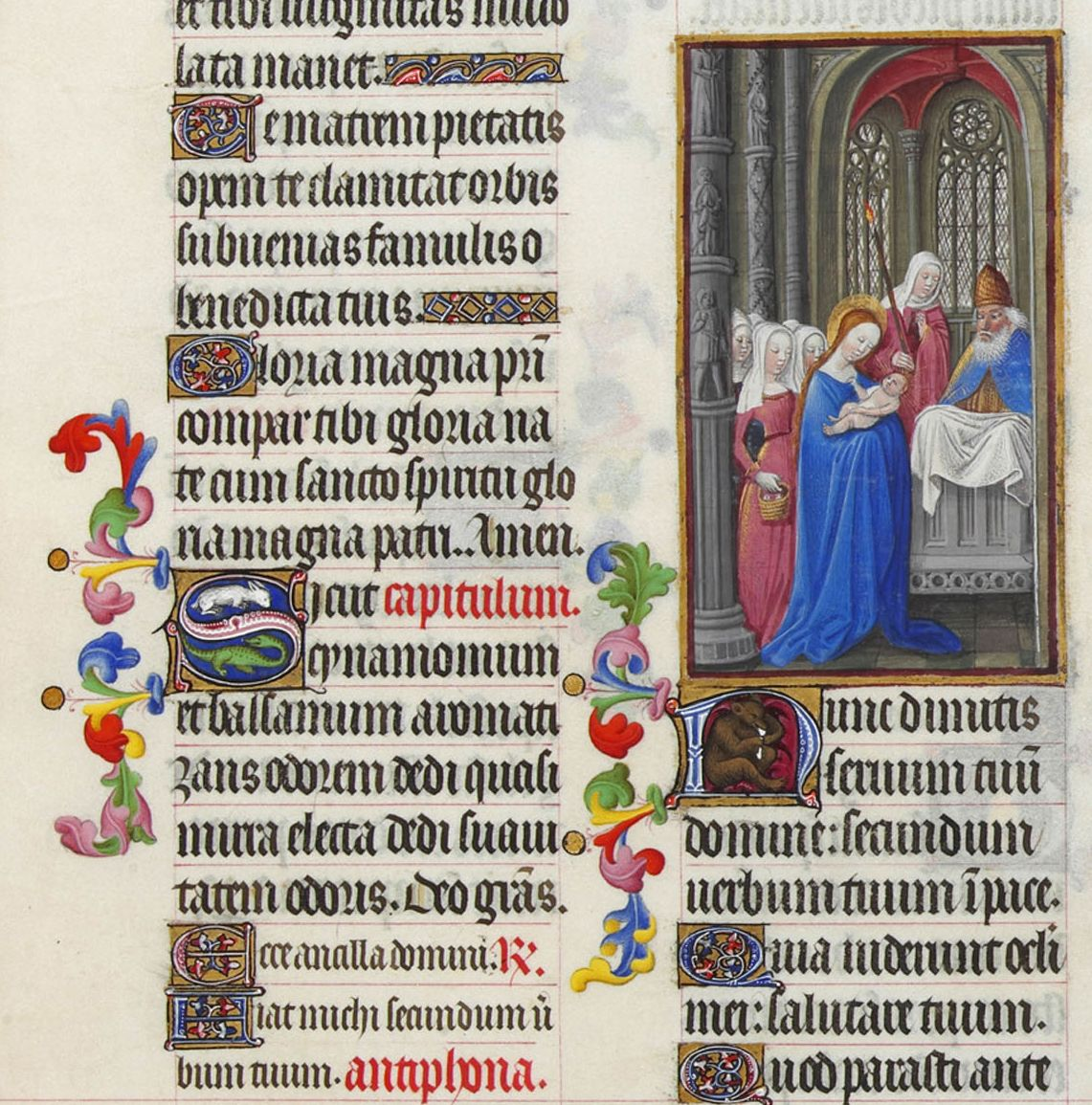
The start of the Nunc dimittis in the Très Riches Heures du Duc de Berry

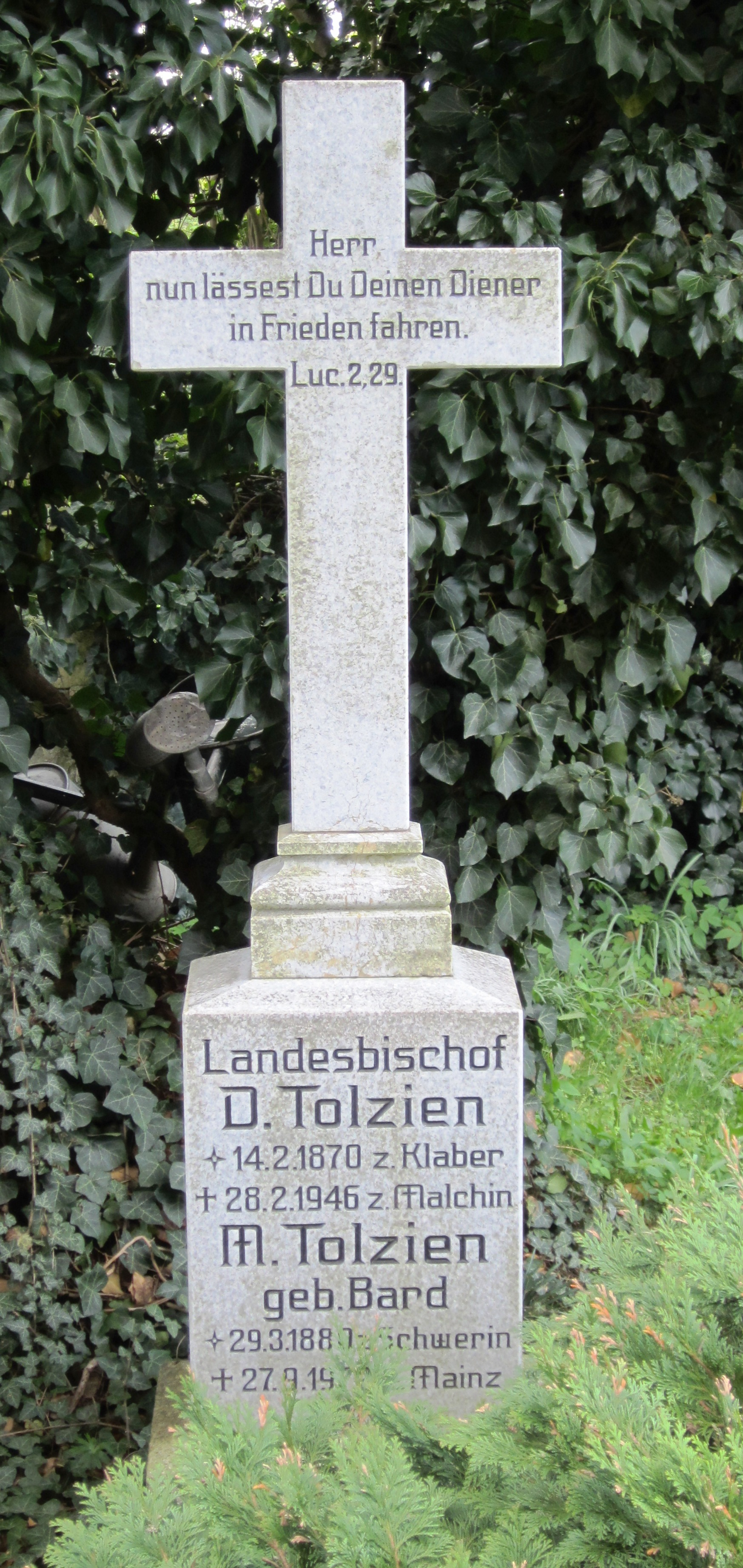
German translation on a tombstone

The "Nunc dimittis" passage in the original Koiné Greek:

νῦν ἀπολύεις τὸν δοῦλόν σου, δέσποτα, κατὰ τὸ ῥῆμά σου ἐν εἰρήνῃ·
ὅτι εἶδον οἱ ὀφθαλμοί μου τὸ σωτήριόν σου,
ὃ ἡτοίμασας κατὰ πρόσωπον πάντων τῶν λαῶν,
φῶς εἰς αποκάλυψιν ἐθνῶν καὶ δόξαν λαοῦ σου Ἰσραήλ.

Transliterated:

Nyn apolyeis ton doulon sou, despota, kata to rhēma sou en eirēnē.
Hoti eidon hoi ophthalmoi mou to sōtērion sou,
ho hētoimasas kata prosōpon pantōn tōn laōn.
Phōs eis apokalypsin ethnōn kai doxan laou sou Israēl.

Latin (Vulgate):

Nunc dimittis servum tuum, Domine, secundum verbum tuum in pace:
Quia viderunt oculi mei salutare tuum
Quod parasti ante faciem omnium populorum:
Lumen ad revelationem gentium, et gloriam plebis tuæ Israel.

English Protestant Translation (Book of Common Prayer (1549)):

Lord, now lettest thou thy servant depart in peace according to thy word.
For mine eyes have seen thy salvation,
Which thou hast prepared before the face of all people;
To be a light to lighten the Gentiles and to be the glory of thy people Israel.

English Catholic Douay–Rheims Bible translation of the Latin Vulgate (1610):

Now thou dost dismiss thy servant, O Lord, according to thy word in peace;
Because my eyes have seen thy salvation,
Which thou hast prepared before the face of all peoples:
A light to the revelation of the Gentiles, and the glory of thy people Israel.

English Protestant Translation (Book of Common Prayer (1979)):

Lord, you now have set your servant free to go in peace as you have promised;
For these eyes of mine have seen the Savior,
whom you have prepared for all the world to see:
A Light to enlighten the nations, and the glory of your people Israel.

English Catholic Translation (Roman Breviary (1985)):

Now, Master, you let your servant go in peace. You have fulfilled your promise.
My own eyes have seen your salvation,
which you have prepared in the sight of all peoples.
A light to bring the Gentiles from darkness; the glory of your people Israel.

English Protestant Translation (Common Worship (2002)):

Now, Lord, you let your servant go in peace: your word has been fulfilled.
My own eyes have seen the salvation which you have prepared in the sight of every people;
A light to reveal you to the nations and the glory of your people Israel.

The Book of Common Prayer (1549) translation of the Nunc dimittis is the same as the one in the Book of Common Prayer (1662). It is very similar to the translation in King James Version (KJV) of the Bible (1611), except for the last line. The KJV (Luke 2:32) reads: "A light to lighten the Gentiles, and the glory of thy people Israel."

Church Slavonic (in Cyrillic)

Ны́нѣ ѻ҆тпꙋща́еши раба́ Твоегѡ̀, Влады́ко, по глаго́лꙋ Твоемꙋ́ съ ми́ромъ;
ꙗ҆́кѡ ви́дѣста ѻ҆́чи мои́ спасе́ніе Твое́,
є҆́же є҆си́ оу҆гото́валъ предъ лице́мъ всѣ́хъ люде́й,
свѣтъ во открове́ніе ꙗ҆зы́ковъ, и҆ сла́ву люде́й Твои́хъ Исра́илѧ.

Nýně otpushcháeshi rabá Tvojegó, Vladýko, po glagólu Tvojemú s" mírom";
jáko víděsta óchi moí spaséníe Tvojé,
ếzhe êsí ugotóval" pred" litsém" vsěkh" lyudéj,
svět" vo otkrovéníe jazýkov", i slávu lyudéj Tvoíkh" Isráilya.

== Commentary ==
Writing in the early 20th century, Friedrich Justus Knecht concludes from this passage that "belief in Jesus Christ drives away all fear of death." He writes:

Simeon now rejoiced at the prospect of death. Such a sensation was hitherto unknown in Israel. "Pious Israelites closed their eyes in death, weary of life and submissive to God’s will; not altogether hopeless, but full of horror of the future. Death was a thing to be feared, and each new day of life which was granted was looked on as a gain" (Grimm). But all at once every thing was changed. Holy Simeon had seen the Saviour, and was now ready to die joyfully. In fact, he did die very soon after; a pious tradition even goes so far as to say that he died before he left the Temple. He was thus the first to take the joyful news to Limbo that the Saviour was born and the day of salvation at hand.

While serving as Prefect at Georgetown College, English Jesuit Roger Baxter reflects on this passage in his 19th-century Meditations, saying: "Oh that you would also bid farewell to all earthly things, and say with the Apostle, 'But I am straitened — having a desire to be dissolved, and to be with Christ.' (Phil. 1:23.)"

== Liturgical and musical settings ==
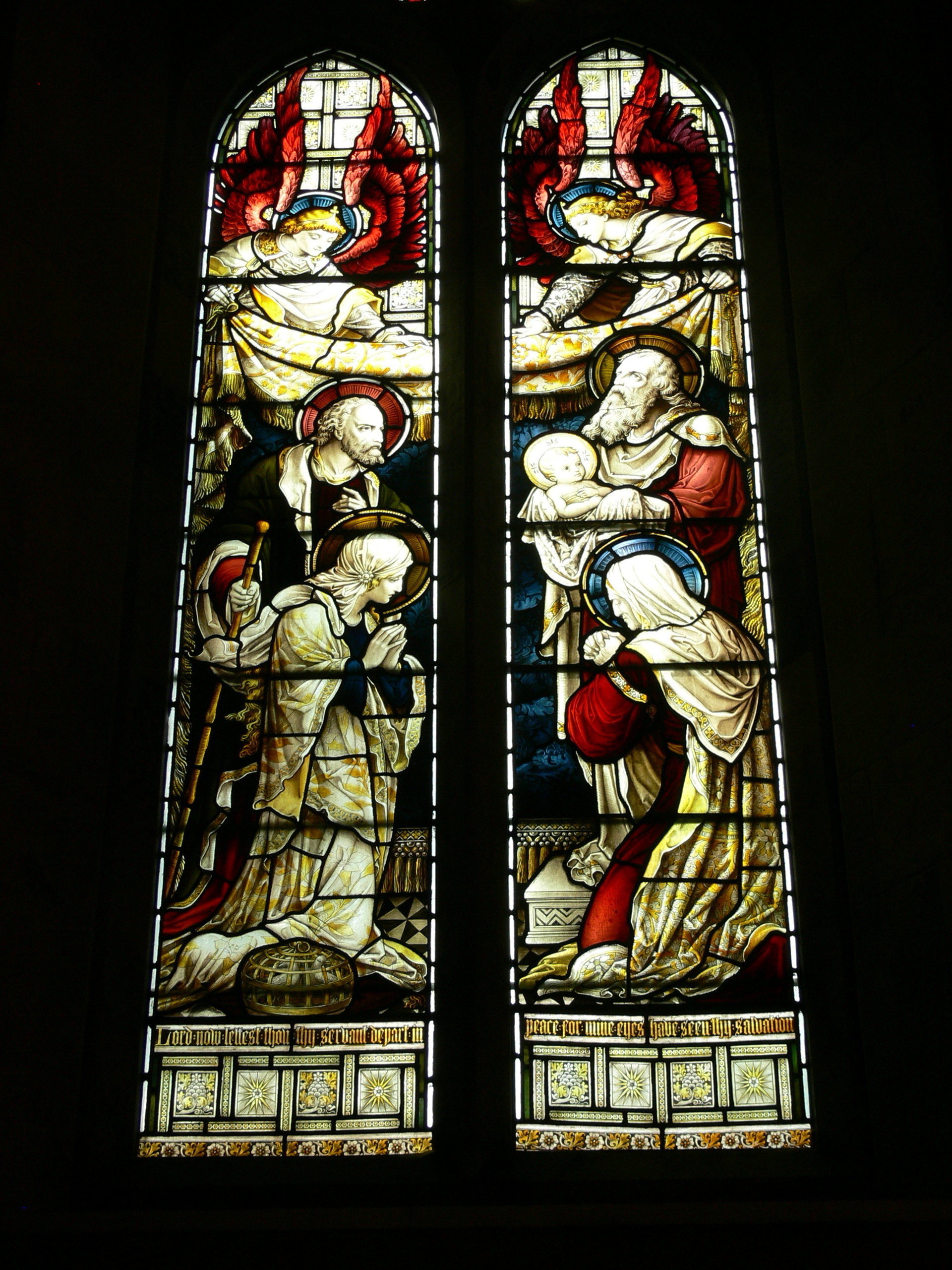
Stained-glass window in St. Alban's Anglican Church in Copenhagen, Denmark, depicting the "Nunc dimittis" scene

The Nunc Dimittis is the traditional "Gospel Canticle" of Night Prayer (Compline), just as Benedictus and Magnificat are the traditional Gospel Canticles of Morning Prayer and Evening Prayer, respectively. The Nunc Dimittis is found in the liturgical night office of many western denominations, including Anglican Evensong in the 1662 Book of Common Prayer, Compline (A Late Evening Service) in the 1928 Book of Common Prayer, and the Night Prayer service in the Common Worship. Both the Catholic and Lutheran services of Compline include this canticle. In eastern tradition the canticle is included in Eastern Orthodox Vespers.

In many Lutheran orders of service, the Nunc Dimittis may be sung following the reception of the Eucharist. A 1530 rhymed version by Johannes Anglicus, "Im Frieden dein, o Herre mein", with a melody by Wolfgang Dachstein, was written in Strasbourg for that purpose. Heinrich Schütz wrote at least two settings, one in Musikalische Exequien (1636), the other in Symphoniae sacrae II (1647). The feast day Mariae Reinigung was observed in the Lutheran Church in J. S. Bach's time. He composed several cantatas for the occasion, including Mit Fried und Freud ich fahr dahin, BWV 125, a chorale cantata on Martin Luther's paraphrase of the canticle, and Ich habe genug, BWV 82.

Many composers have set the text to music, usually coupled in the Anglican church with the Magnificat, as both the Magnificat and the Nunc dimittis are sung (or said) during the Anglican service of Evening Prayer according to the Book of Common Prayer, 1662. This prayer book merged the older offices of Vespers (Evening Prayer) and Compline (Night Prayer) into one service, which contained both Gospel canticles. In Common Worship, this is listed among "Canticles for Use at Funeral and Memorial Services" One of the most well-known settings in England is a plainchant theme by Thomas Tallis. Herbert Howells composed 20 settings of this pair of canticles, including the Gloucester Service (1947) and the St Paul's Service (1951). A setting of the Nunc dimittis by Charles Villiers Stanford was sung as the recessional at the funeral of Margaret Thatcher. Stanford wrote many settings of both the Magnificat and Nunc dimittis.

The Genevan Psalter used by Calvinist churches also included the metrical versification for Nunc Dimittis. The music was composed by Louis Bourgeois and the lyrics were versified from the biblical text by Clément Marot.

A setting by British composer Geoffrey Burgon is featured during the end credits of episodes in the 1979 television adaptation of Tinker Tailor Soldier Spy.

Sergei Rachmaninoff wrote a setting of the Slavonic Nunc dimittis text, Ны́не отпуща́еши (Nyne otpushchayeshi), as the fifth movement of his All-Night Vigil. It is known for its final measures, in which the basses sing a descending scale ending on the B♭ below the bass clef.

The neoclassical electronic music group Mannheim Steamroller used the text of Nunc Dimittis in the song "Lumen" on their album Fresh Aire V, that was otherwise based on Johannes Kepler's novel Somnium.

== Literary settings ==
- Thomas Jefferson, Letter to Marquis de Lafayette (17 May 1816), Joseph Cabell (31 January 1821), and General Andrew Jackson (18 December 1823)
- Ezra Pound poem "Cantico del Sole" (1918)
- Karel Čapek play R.U.R. (1920)
- T. S. Eliot poem A Song for Simeon (1928)
- Roald Dahl short story "Nunc Dimittis" (1953–1979)
- T. H. White novel The Once and Future King (1958) – recitation by Merlyn
- Walter Miller, A Canticle for Leibowitz (1959)
- John le Carré novel A Murder of Quality (1962)
- Joseph Brodsky poem "Nunc Dimittis" (1972)
- John le Carré novel Tinker Tailor Soldier Spy (1974) – closing theme of TV adaptation
- Tanith Lee story "Nunc Dimittis" (1984–1986)
- John le Carré novel The Constant Gardener (2001) – sung at the funeral of Tessa Quayle
- H. W. Brands novel The Strange Death of American Liberalism
- David Mitchell novel Cloud Atlas – "Pacific journal of Adam Ewing, part 1"
- Edith Pargeter novel, writing as Ellis Peters in the 6th and 15th volumes of "The Cadfael Chronicles", The Virgin in the Ice and The Confession of Brother Haluin
- J. L. Carr novel A Month in the Country (1980)

== See also ==
- Our Lady of Sorrows § Seven Sorrows of Mary
