= Evensong =

Church service

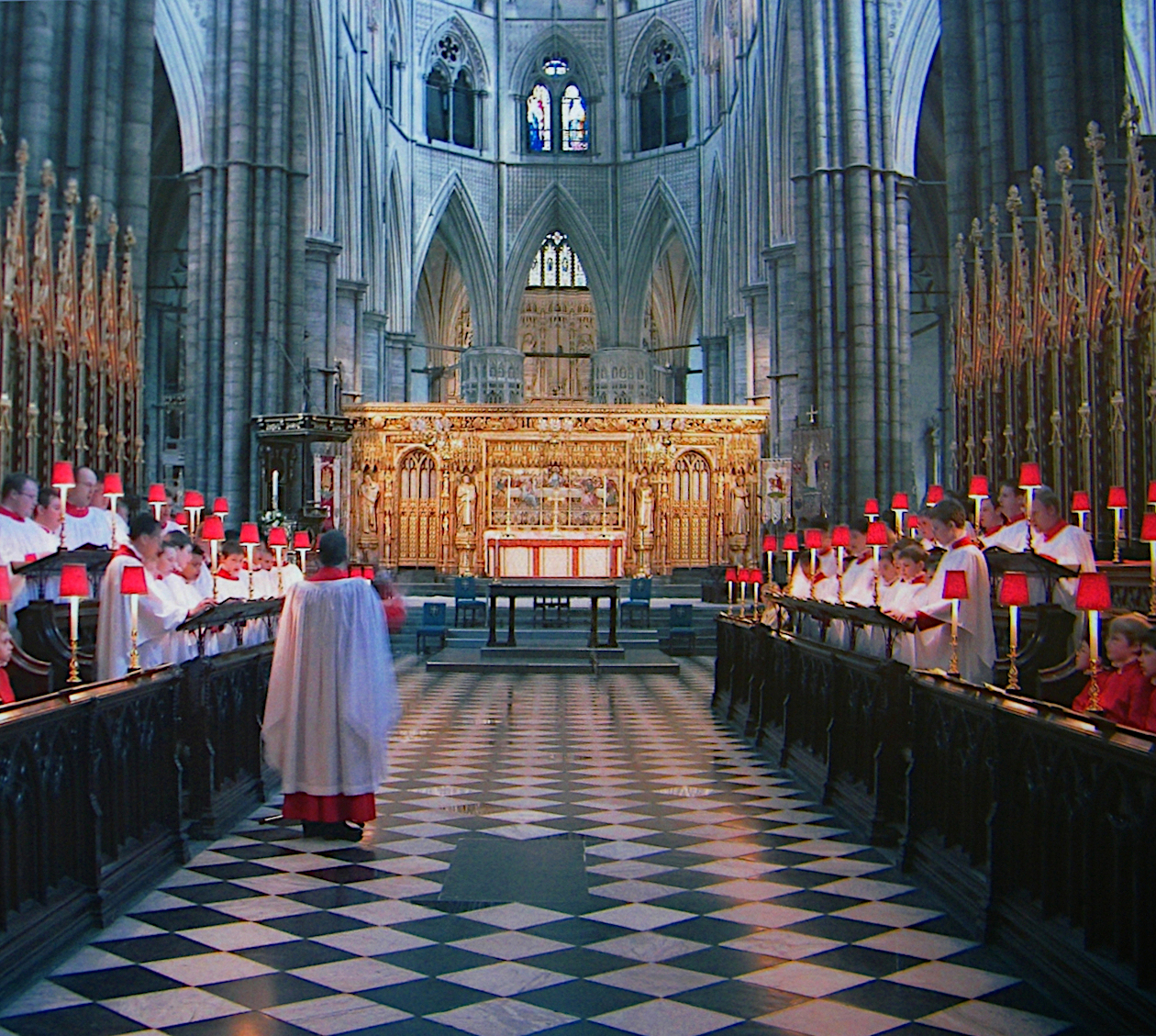
Evening prayer often takes the form of Choral Evensong, such as this service at Westminster Abbey.

Evensong is a church service traditionally held near twilight focused on singing psalms and other biblical canticles, usually in the Anglican church music tradition. It is loosely based on the canonical hours of vespers and compline. Old English speakers translated the Latin word vesperas as æfensang, which became 'evensong' in modern English. Typically used in reference to the Anglican daily office's evening liturgy, it can also refer to the pre-Reformation form of vespers or services of evening prayer from other denominations, particularly within the Anglican Use of the Catholic Church.

== Structure ==
From Late Antiquity onwards, the office of vespers normally included psalms, the Magnificat, a hymn, and other prayers. By the Early Middle Ages, it became common for secular clergy to combine vespers and compline. By the sixteenth century, worshippers in western Europe conceived 'evensong' as vespers and compline performed without break. Modern Eastern Orthodox services advertised as 'vespers' often similarly conclude with compline, especially as part of the all-night vigil.

When the English reformation produced the Book of Common Prayer, it provided a version of evensong that abbreviated the secular version of vespers and compline, drawing on the Use of Sarum. Nearly all its elements are taken from medieval service books, with only minor changes to the order in which they appear.

== Music ==
Examples of music for choral evensong
Preces & responses
The preces and responses by William Smith of Durham

Psalm Chant: Psalm 84
A setting of Psalm 84 by Hubert Parry, an example of Anglican chant

Evening Canticles: Magnificat
The Magnificat from the Evening Service in A by Stanford

Evening Canticles: Nunc Dimittis
The Nunc Dimittis from the Evening Service in A by Stanford

Anthem: God So Loved the World
The popular anthem, God So Loved the World, from Stainer's Crucifixion

Evensong was initially sung entirely to plainsong. Musicians gradually created polyphonic settings of its music, especially of the Magnificat.

The first musical setting of the Book of Common Prayer, by John Marbeck, provided a simplified version of traditional chant settings. It remains unclear whether plainsong remained a common feature of evensong in the Church of England after the sixteenth century. Metrical psalms and Anglican Chant were also developed as alternate methods of singing the psalms and canticles.

In choral evensong, all of the service is sung or chanted by the officiating minister and a choir. In cathedrals, or on particularly important days in the church calendar, the canticles are performed in elaborate settings. In churches where a choir is not present, simpler versions of the psalms and canticles are usually sung by the congregation, sometimes with responses and collects spoken rather than sung. Said evening prayer services with the musical setting omitted are also sometimes referred to as evensong.

A number of composers have contributed settings of the canticles. These range from late Renaissance composers such as Thomas Tallis, William Byrd and Orlando Gibbons, through Victorian composers such as Charles Villiers Stanford, Thomas Attwood Walmisley to later masters of the form such as Herbert Murrill, Basil Harwood, Herbert Howells, Michael Tippett, Giles Swayne, and Arvo Pärt (who composed a Magnificat and Nunc dimittis at different times).

In Anglo-Catholic parishes, the service may conclude with Benediction of the Blessed Sacrament (or a modified form of "Devotions to the Blessed Sacrament") and the carrying of the reserved sacrament under a humeral veil from the high altar to an altar of repose, to the accompaniment of music.

The service may also include hymns. The first of these may be called the Office Hymn, and will usually be particularly closely tied to the liturgical theme of the day, and may be an ancient plainchant setting. This will usually be sung just before the psalm(s) or immediately before the first canticle and may be sung by the choir alone. Otherwise, any hymns normally come toward the end of the service, maybe one on either side of the sermon (if there is one), or following the anthem. These hymns will generally be congregational.

== Churches offering evensong ==
=== Great Britain ===
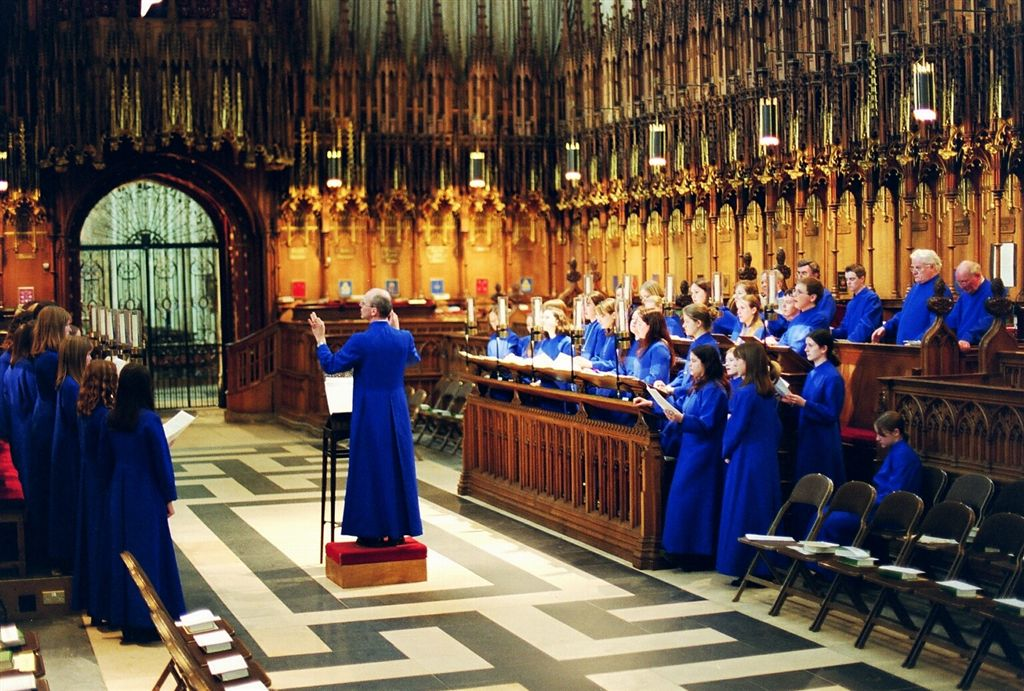
The choir rehearsing for Evensong in York Minster

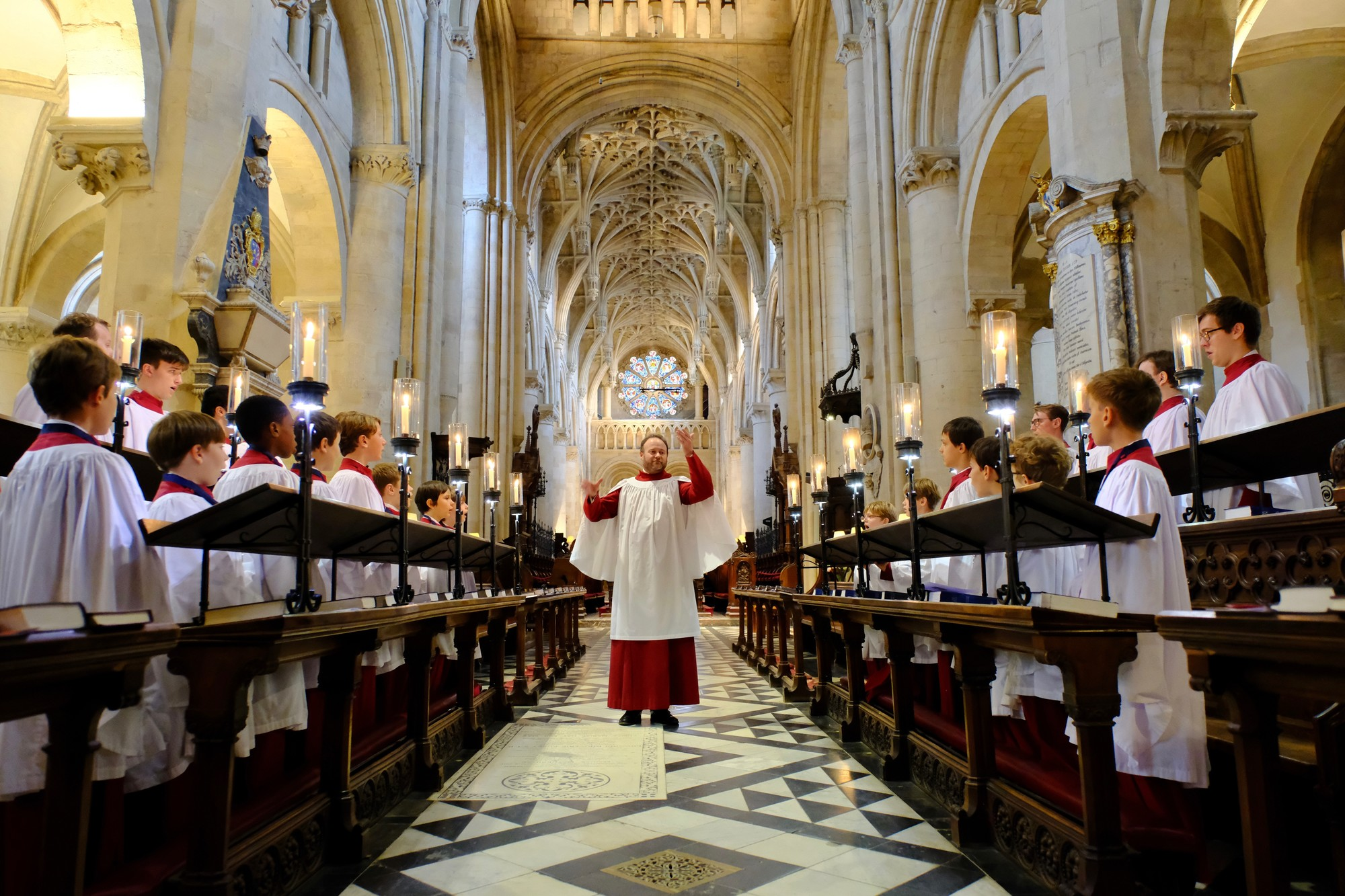
Choral Evensong at Christ Church Cathedral, Oxford

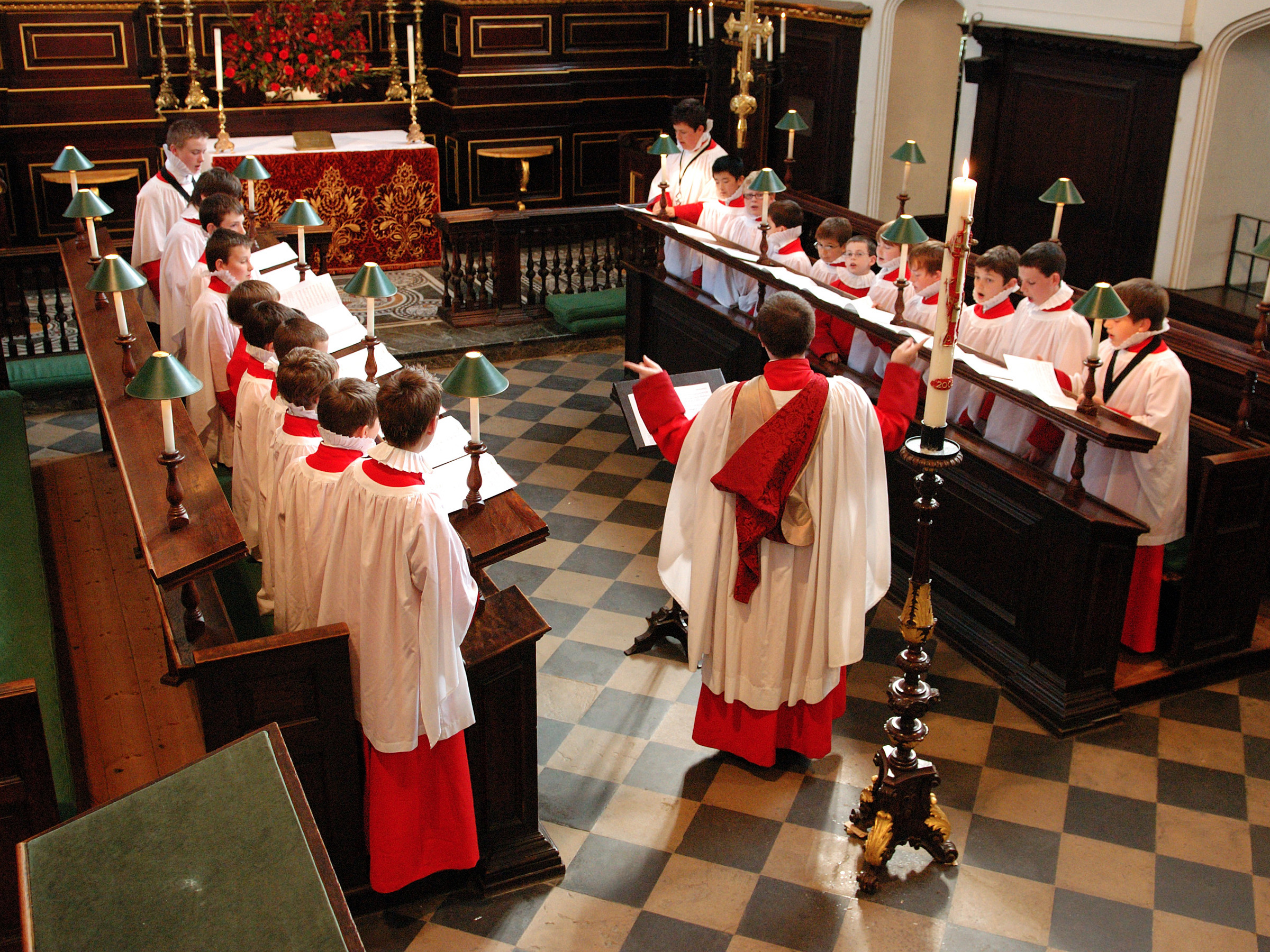
A parish church choir at All Saints' Church, Northampton singing Evensong

Most cathedrals of the Church of England, where the service originates, and a number of university college chapels (e.g. in the University of Cambridge, the University of Oxford, the University of St Andrews, the University of Durham and King's College London) offer evensong regularly, often daily. Most of the cathedrals of the Church in Wales and the Scottish Episcopal Church also offer choral evensong. Choral evensong is usually sung during term time; at other times, it is often sung by a voluntary or visiting choir, or replaced with said Evening Prayer.

Aside from the cathedrals and collegiate chapels, evensong is also sung in many parish churches around England where there is a choral tradition. There may be a choral service each Sunday or less frequently, such as on a monthly basis or only on feast days in the liturgical calendar. Many churches in central London have a professional choir and have a weekly service of choral evensong, among them All Saints, Margaret Street, Holy Trinity Sloane Square, St Bartholomew the Great and St Bride's, Fleet Street.

=== Ireland ===
Most of the larger churches and cathedrals of the Church of Ireland offer evensong. It is sung six times a week at St Patrick's Cathedral, Dublin, twice at Christ Church Cathedral, Dublin, and once at Trinity College, Dublin. Additionally, although rarely, some parish churches hold evensong; however, this is most often replaced with Evening Prayer.

=== United States and Canada ===
Most of the larger cathedrals and large parishes of the Episcopal Church and the Anglican Church of Canada offer choral evensong. During the school year, Washington National Cathedral offers Evensong not only on Sunday afternoon, but also from Monday to Thursday, with the Girl Choristers and the Boy Choristers alternating. Saint Thomas Church on Fifth Avenue in New York City offers Evensong from Tuesday to Thursday during the school year, in addition to Sundays.

Evensong is also often offered at Episcopal seminaries as part of a chapel program. For example, General Theological Seminary currently offers Evensong.

=== Africa ===
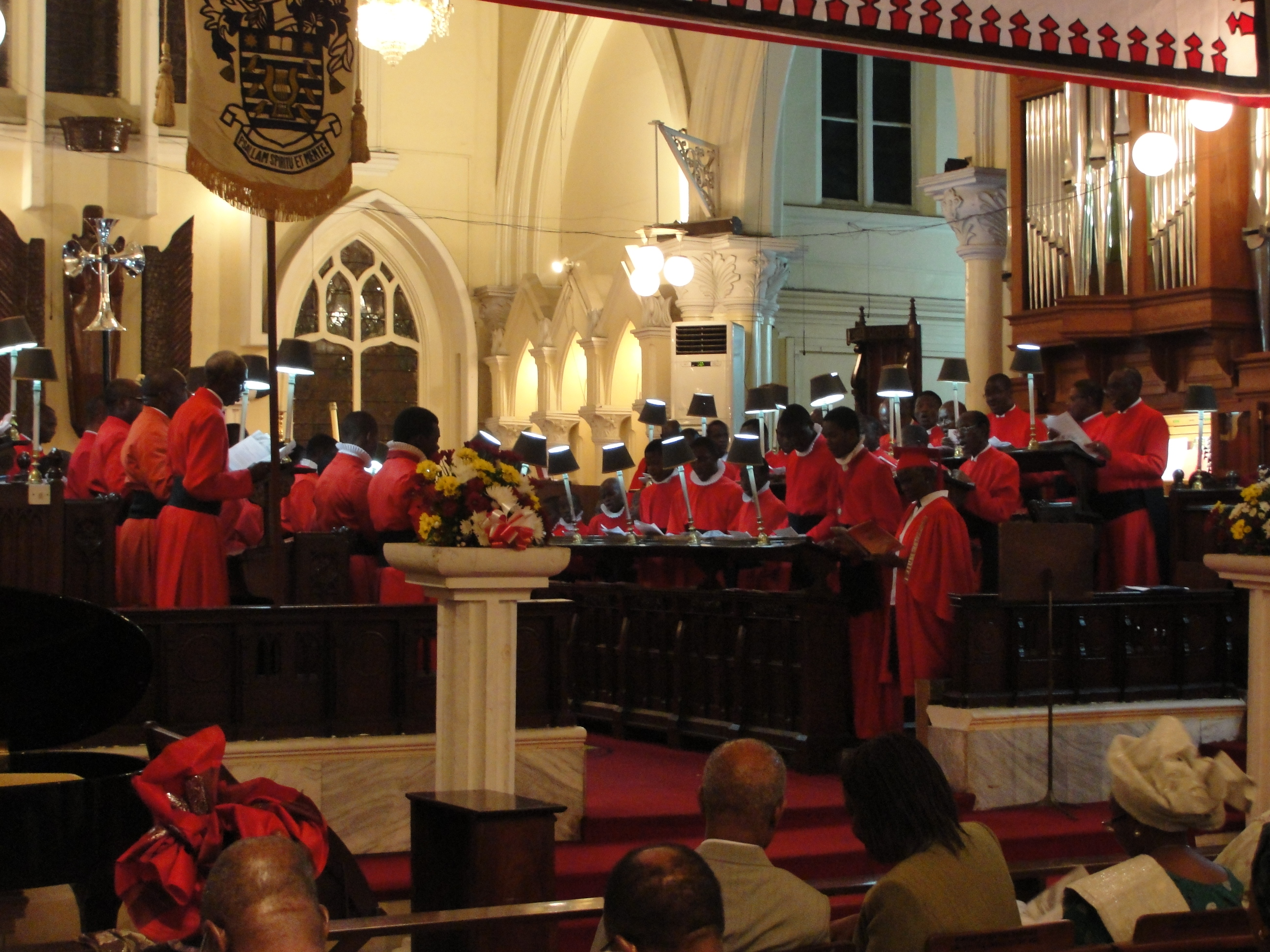
Christchurch Cathedral Choir, Lagos

Throughout the countries of Africa with a large Anglican presence, evensong is also offered, for instance in the Cathedral Church of Christ, Lagos, Nigeria, St George's Cathedral, Cape Town, South Africa, and every Sunday at the St Cyprian's Cathedral, Kimberley, South Africa.

=== Australia and New Zealand ===
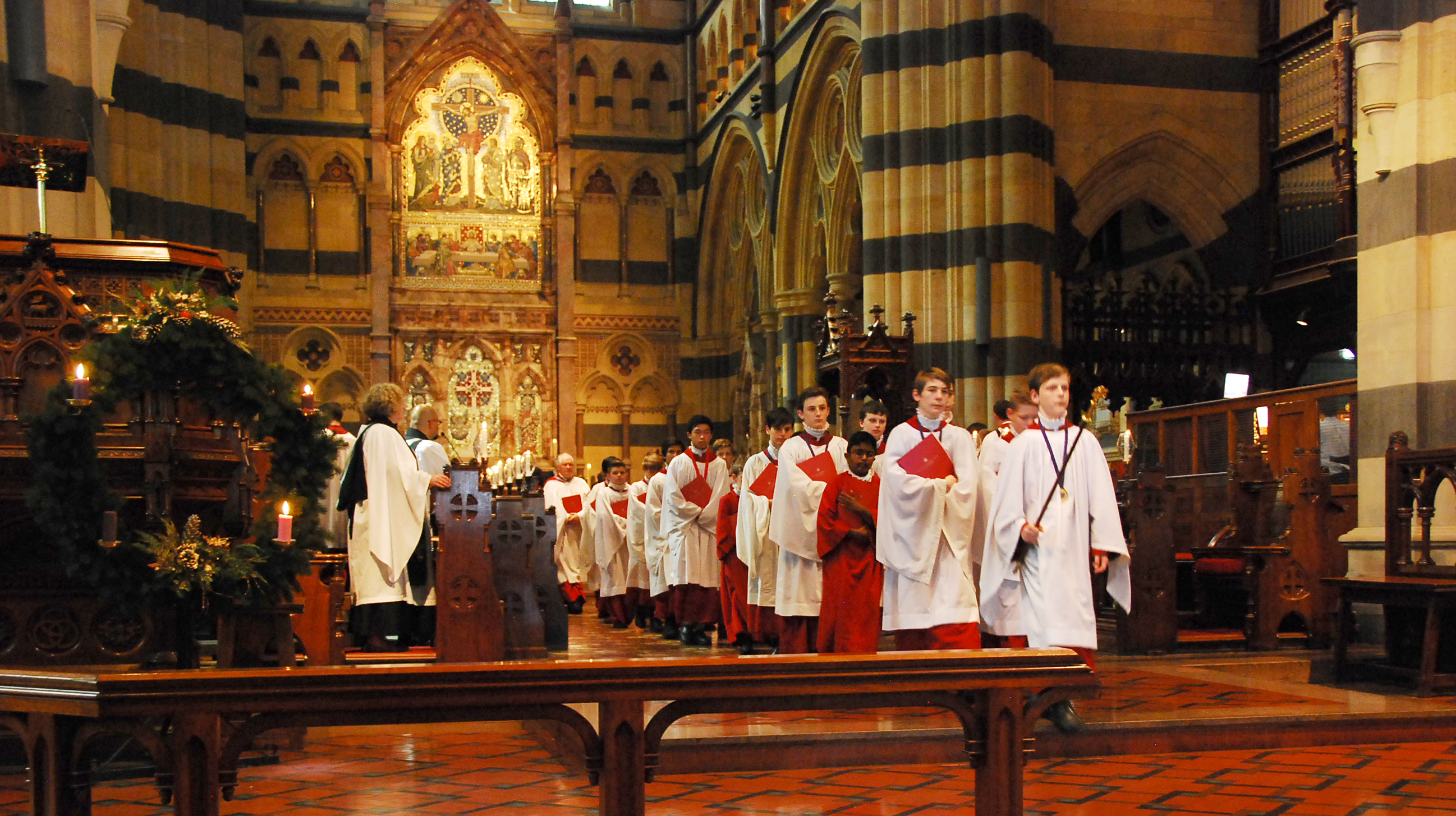
The choir in procession at a service at St Paul's Cathedral, Melbourne

Most of the cathedrals of the Anglican Church of Australia offer choral evensong at least weekly, with St Paul's Cathedral, Melbourne offering daily evensong. Likewise in the Anglican Church in Aotearoa, New Zealand and Polynesia, evensong is offered at the cathedrals in Auckland, Nelson, Christchurch, Dunedin, and Wellington.

=== Asia ===
- St John's Cathedral, Hong Kong
- All Saints' Cathedral, Hong Kong
- St Andrew's Cathedral, Singapore
- St Mary's Cathedral, Kuala Lumpur, Malaysia
- Rikkyo All Saints' Chapel, Tokyo, Japan
- Rikkyo St. Paul's Chapel, Saitama, Japan

=== Non-Anglican churches ===
The popularity of evensong has spread to other churches, particularly churches of the Presbyterian Church (USA) and United Methodist churches which use a formal liturgical worship style. Examples in the Presbyterian Church include Fourth Presbyterian Church (Chicago) and Independent Presbyterian Church (Birmingham, Alabama) both of which offer evensong services on a seasonal basis, as does Peachtree Road United Methodist Church in Atlanta, Georgia.

There are some Roman Catholic churches and abbeys in England offering choral evensong: These include Ampleforth Abbey, Liverpool Metropolitan Cathedral, the Birmingham Oratory, Ealing Abbey, Leeds Cathedral, Downside Abbey, the London Oratory, and Westminster Cathedral.

Loyola University Maryland, a Jesuit Catholic university in Baltimore, Maryland, celebrates a half-hour evensong on Thursday evenings, although this has been temporarily suspended.

In Scotland, some larger churches (and former cathedrals belonging to the Church of Scotland) hold evensong, including Glasgow Cathedral, Paisley Abbey (2nd Sunday of each month), and Edinburgh Cathedral.

The Basilica of St. Nicholas in Amsterdam holds choral evensong on Saturdays.

== Broadcasts ==
The BBC has, since 1926, broadcast a weekly service of Choral Evensong. It is broadcast (usually live) on BBC Radio 3 on Wednesdays at 15:30 and is repeated the following Sunday. Between February 2007 and September 2008, the service was broadcast on Sunday only. The service comes live from an English cathedral or collegiate institution. It is occasionally, however, a recording or is replaced by a different form of service or a service from a church elsewhere in the world or of another denomination. The most recent broadcast is available on BBC Sounds for up to a week after the original broadcast. There is also an archive available.

== Cultural heritage ==
In 2026, the Cathedral Music Trust, the Royal School of Church Music and others have submitted English evensong to the UK Living Heritage Inventory, with a view to obtaining UNESCO Intangible Cultural Heritage Listing.

== See also ==
- Morning Prayer (Anglican)
- Matins
- Vespers
- Anglican chant
- Anglican church music
- Magnificat
- Nunc dimittis
- Anglican devotions
