= List of English settings of Magnificats and Nunc dimittis =

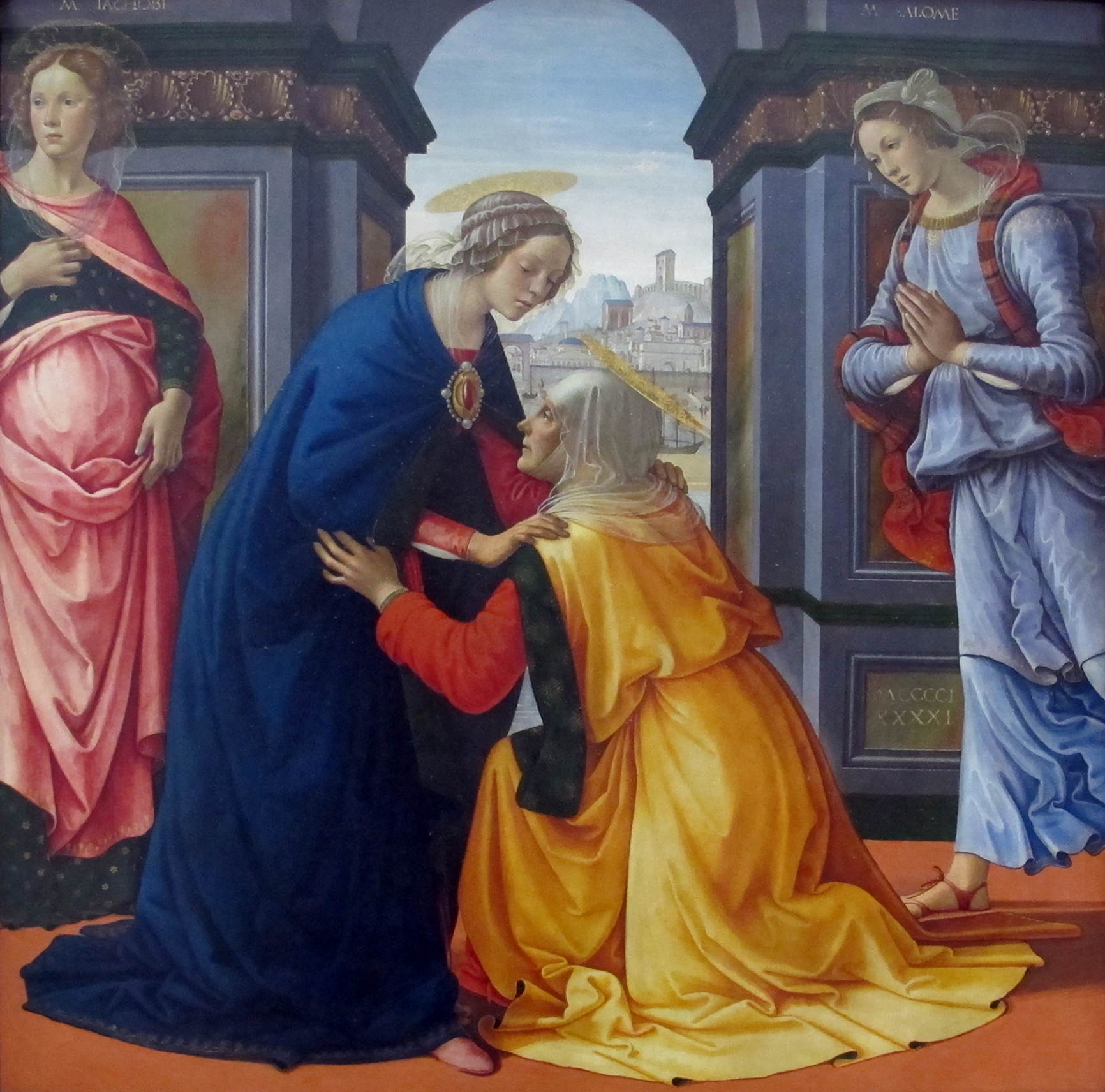
Visitation, by Domenico Ghirlandaio (1491), depicts Mary visiting her elderly cousin Elizabeth, the scenario of the Magnificat.

There are many English settings of Magnificats and Nunc dimittis, both "classic" and notable, as well as contemporary ones that are lesser known.

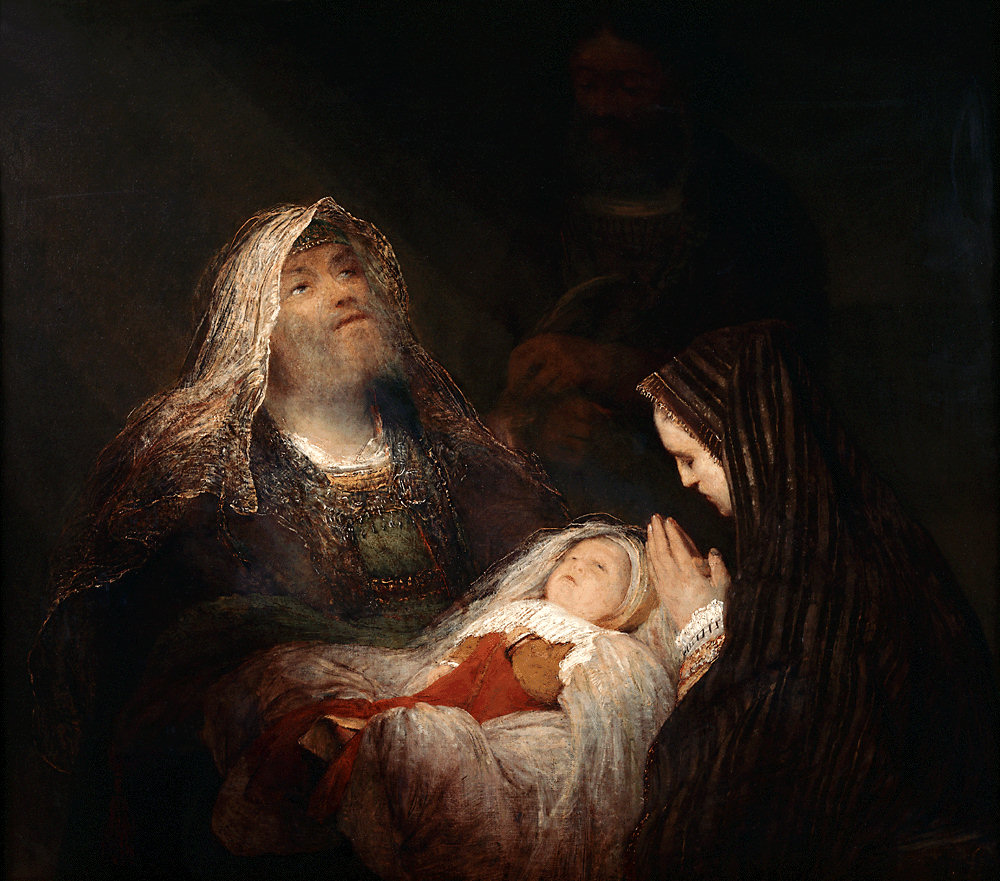
Simeon's Song of Praise by Aert de Gelder, c. 1700–1710, the scenario for the Nunc dimittis.

Evensong is unusual in several ways:

The service of Evensong is one of few within the church that continues to attract new congregations and maintains an almost 'cult' following. At the mid-point between active day and restful night, Evensong gives listeners time for contemplation and continues to inspire some of the greatest church music ever written. ... Either side of the service's New Testament readings are the evening canticles, the core repertoire of the Evensong - Magnificat and Nunc Dimittis. One, the Magnificat, is a song of a young woman, Mary, rejoicing at the prospect of her child's birth. The ensuing Nunc Dimittis is the voice of an old man named Simeon, reflecting on meeting Jesus and accepting his own death. Composers have set these two texts for centuries, but the 20th century produced some of the most important settings we know and hear today. Alongside these well-known canticles, many exist that haven't yet entered into the standard repertory, either due to being written so recently, or due to their composer's gender, race or faith tradition.

— Hattie Butterworth, for Gramophone

== Settings, by composer ==
(This does not include Gregorian Chants, Tones from I-IX (Fauxbordons) or Magnificats or Nunc dimittis in Latin). Works are assumed to be for SATB, with or without divisions, unless otherwise specified.

=== Composers A ===
Alcock Jr in A minor

Alcock Jr in D

Alcock Sr in G

Aldrich in E

Aldrich in G

Anderson

H K Andrews in D

H K Andrews in F (Treble voices)

H K Andrews in G

Amner (Cesar Service)

Arnold in A

Ashfield in D

Ashfield in G minor

Aston in G (Treble voices)

Aston in F

Aston St Andrews Service

Atkins in G

Attwood in C

Ayleward Short Service

=== Composers B ===
Bairstow in D

Bairstow in E Flat (Unison voices)

Bairstow in G

Barnby in D

Barnby in E Flat

Barnby in E

Barrow in F (c.1720 - 1789)

Batten 1st Service (Also Short Service)

Batten 2nd Service

Batten 3rd Service

Batten 4th Service

Batten 5th Service

Bax in G

Beer First Service (Treble voices)

Beer Second Service

Bennett in D minor (Men's voices)

Berkeley Chichester Service

Blatchly Third Service

Blair in B minor

Blow in F

Blow in G

Blow in the Dorian Moder

Blow Short Service

Brewer in D

Brewer in C

Brewer in E Flat

Brewer in F

Bryan Norwich Service

Bullock in C

Bullock in D

Bunnett in F

Burgon Magnificat and Nunc Dimittis

Burrell (Treble voices)

Byrd Short Service

Byrd Second Service

Byrd Third Service

Byrd The Great Service

=== Composers C ===
Carter Southwell Service

Chilcott Crescent City

Chilcott Downing Service

Child in E minor

Cleobury Short Service (men's voices)

Samuel Coleridge-Taylor in F

Cook in C

Cook in G

Cruft in A (Collegium Regale)

=== Composers D ===
Darke in A minor

Darke in E

Darke in F

Day in B Flat

Day in F

Davies in G (Festal)

Doveton SATB

Doveton ATB

Dyson in D

Dyson in C minor (Unison voices)

Dyson in F

=== Composers E ===
Edwards in C Sharp minor

Ebdon in C

=== Composers F ===
Farrant Short Service

Forbes L'Estrange King's College Service

Frances-Hoad Magnificat and Nunc Dimittis

Friedell in F

=== Composers G ===
Gibbons Second Service

Gibbons Short Service

Glasser

Gray in F minor

Greene in C

=== Composers H ===
Harker in A flat

Harris in A

Harwood in A flat

Harwood in E minor

Hawes in D

Hemingway in E

Hemingway The King's Service

Howells in B minor

Howells in E major (Men's voices)

Howells in G

Howells Chichester Service

Howells Collegium Regale

Howells Collegium Sancti Johannis Cantabridgiense

Howells Dallas Service

Howells Gloucester Service

Howells Hereford Service

Howells Magdalen College Service

Howells New College Service

Howells St Paul's Service

Howells Sarum Service

Howells Westminster Service

Howells Worcester Service

Howells York Service

Hunt on American themes, with chants.

Hurford in A (Treble voices)

Hurford in F sharp minor

=== Composers I ===
Ireland in F

Ives Edington Service

Ives Magdalen Service (ATB voices)

=== Composers J ===
F Jackson in G

G Jackson Truro Service

Johnson on Plainsong Tones

Jones The Berkeley Service (Treble voices)

=== Composers K ===
Kelly Jamaican Service

Kelly in C (Latin American)

Kelly Peterborough Service

Kelway in B minor

Knott Third Service

=== Composers L ===
L’Estrange New College Service

Leighton Second Service

Leighton Magdalen Service

Letts in A

C H Lloyd in A

R Lloyd Durham Service

R Lloyd St Cuthbert Service (on Plainsong tones)

R Lloyd Hereford Service

R Lloyd St Radegund Service (Treble voices)

Lole St David's Service (Unison voices)

Long in F (Treble voices)

Lumsden Lichfield Service (on Plainsong tones)

=== Composers M ===
MacDonald in A flat

Major in G

Mathias Jesus College Service

Millington Topsham Service

Moeran in D

Moore in A (Men's voices)

Moore First Service (Faux-bourdons)

Moore Second Service (Faux-bourdons)

Moore Third Service (Faux-bourdons)

Moore John Scott Service

Moore Collegium Sancti Johannis Cantabrigiense

Moore St Pancras Service

Moore St Thomas Service

Moore St Woolos Service

Morley First Service

Murrill in E

=== Composers N ===
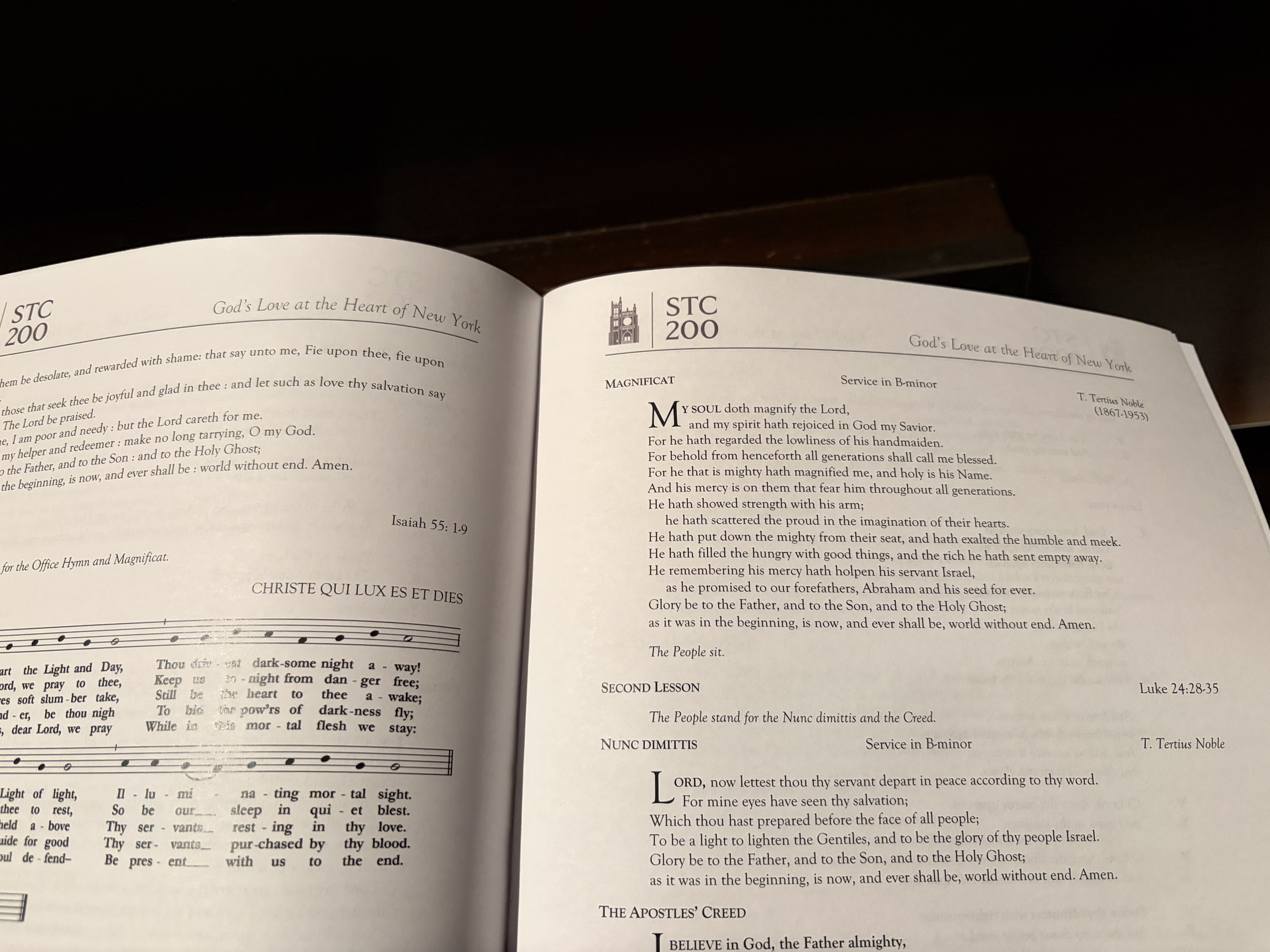
Photo of the T. Tertius Noble Service in B-minor from the Bulletin of Saint Thomas Church Fifth Avenue, for the Evensong on March 8, 2026

Nares in F

Naylor in A

Near St Mark's Service

Nixon (Faux-bourdons)

Noble in A minor

Noble in B minor

=== Composers O ===
Orr Short Service

Ossewaarde in C

=== Composers P ===
Panufnik St Pancras

C H H Parry in D

Parsons First/Great Service

Patterson Norwich Service

Pearce in D (Double Choir)

Purcell (Daniel) in E minor

Purcell in B flat

Purcell in G minor

=== Composers R ===
Radcliffe in C

Ramsay (Treble voices)

Ridout in A minor (Treble voices)

Ridout in B flat (Men's voices)

Ridout in F

Ridout Peterborough Service

Rogers in A minor

Rogers in D (Sharp service)

Rogers in F

Rose in C minor

Rose in E (Treble voices)

Rubbra in A flat

=== Composers S ===
Sanders Gloucester Service

Sanders Hereford Service

Sanders Lichfield Service

Schuller St Thomas Service

Shephard Hereford Service

Shephard Llandaff Service (Treble voices)

Shephard Salisbury Service

Smart in B flat

Smart in G

Sowerby in D

Stainer in B flat

Stanford in A

Stanford in B flat

Stanford in C

Stanford in F

Stanford in G (1902)

Statham in E minor

Stewart in C

Sumsion in A

Sumsion in D

Sumsion in G (Treble voices)

Sumsion in G (Men's voices)

Susa St Thomas Service

Svane St Thomas Service (Treble voices)

=== Composers T ===
Tabakova, Truro Canticles

Tallis Short Service, in the Dorian Mode

Tanner Southwark Centenary Service

Tavener Collegium Regale

Tippett Collegium Sancti Johannis Cantabrigiense

Tomkins Third Service

Tomkins Fifth Service

=== Composers V ===
Vann Chester Service (Treble voices)

Vann Chichester Service

Vann Hereford Service

Vann Peterborough Service

=== Composers W ===
Walmisley in D major

Walmisley in D minor

Walton Chichester Service

Ward First Service

Warren Bristol Service

Watson in E

Watson in E flat

Watson in F (Treble voices)

Weelkes First Service

Weelkes Fourth Service (Treble voices)

Weelkes Fifth Service (In medio chori)

Weelkes Sixth Service

Weelkes Eighth Service (for Five voices)

West in C (Men's voices)

Whiteley York Service

Whitlock in D

Wicks Cherubini Service

Willan in A

Willan in E flat

Willan (Faux-bourdons)

Williams in C

Willis Derby Service

Wills in D

Wills on Plainsong Tones (Men's voices)

Wise in E flat

Wise in F

Wood in A flat

Wood in A minor

Wood in C

Wood in C minor

Wood in E (Men's voices)

Wood in E flat No. 1

Wood in E flat No. 2

Wood in F

Wood in F (Collegium Regale)

Wood in G

Wood founded on an old Scotch chant.

Wright in E minor.
