= Clutag Press =

British publishing company

- Formation: 2000
- Location: Thame, Oxfordshire, England.
- Founder: Andrew McNeillie
- Website: www.clutagpress.com

The Clutag Press was established in 2000 as a venture by Andrew McNeillie to issue Clutag Poetry Leaflets, by established and emerging poets. In 2004, it received backing from The Christopher Tower Fund (in association with Christ Church, Oxford, Oxford University). As a result, it began issuing more substantial poetry pamphlets, full-length books, and CD sound recordings.

Its literary archive is now collected exclusively by the Bodleian Library, Oxford University, in digital and paper formats.

== Bibliography ==
Its catalogue of poetry pamphlets includes:

- Paul Thomas Abbott - FLOOD (2008)
- Tom Paulin - The Camouflage School (2007)
- Mick Imlah - DIEHARD (2006)
- Anne Stevenson - A Lament For The Makers (2006)
- Andrew McNeillie and Julian Bell - Arkwork with Artwork (2006)
- Geoffrey Hill - A Treatise of Civil Power (2005)
- Seamus Heaney - A Shiver (2005)
- John Fuller - The Solitary Life (2005)

Its catalogue of prose books includes:

- Andrew McNeillie - Ian Niall: Part of his Life (2007)
- John McNeillie - My Childhood (2004)

Its catalogue of CDs and sound recordings includes:

- Geoffrey Hill - Poetry Reading, Oxford (2006)

== Archipelago ==
In summer 2007, the Clutag Press launched a new magazine: Archipelago. Its first issue featured contributions from: Paul Thomas Abbott, Norman Ackroyd, John Beatty, Julian Bell, Roger Deakin, Greg Delanty, Seamus Heaney, Mick Imlah, Nicolas Jacobs, Andrew Kahn, Michael Longley, Robert Macfarlane, Derek Mahon, Osip Mandelshtam, Andrew McNeillie, Gail McNeillie, David Nash, Bernard O'Donoghue, Angharad Price and Mark Williams.

Writing in the Guardian, Robert Macfarlane said its tone was "praiseful and attentive, content to acknowledge both the mystery of placehood and the strangeness of material fact."
