= Bernard O'Donoghue =

Irish poet and academic

- Born: 14 December 1945 (age 80); Cullen, County Cork, Ireland
- Occupations: poet, academic, author
- Years active: 1970-Present

Bernard O'Donoghue FRSL (born 14 December 1945) is a contemporary Irish poet and academic.

== Early life and education ==
Bernard O'Donoghue was born on 14 December 1945 in Cullen, County Cork, Ireland, where he lived on a farm. “My father was a terrible and reluctant farmer, though my mother was very good, she got stuck into it,” he recalled in an interview with Shevaun Wilder. He learnt Irish from the age of five in the local school, and served Mass from when he was about ten, “just parroting the Latin answers,” an experience which “inclined him towards the medieval.”

When he was 16, his father died suddenly, and the family left Ireland, moving to Manchester, England. He attended St Bede's College, a Catholic school near Alexandra Park, from where he moved on to Lincoln College, Oxford in 1965 to read English literature.

== Career ==
After a year working as a computer programmer with IBM, O’Donoghue returned to Oxford to do a post-graduate degree in Medieval studies, also at Lincoln College. He has remained in Oxford ever since, apart from an annual return to County Cork, “It's good to have two places,” he says, “Two perspectives. When you're in one, you think you belong to the other one." He obtained a lectureship in English at Magdalen College, Oxford, remaining with the college from 1971 to 1995. Magdalen is where he started writing poetry, prompted by his colleague, John Fuller, who ran the college poetry society. “To go to it you had to write a poem, so that's what I started doing.”

O’Donoghue moved to Wadham College, Oxford in 1995 as Fellow and tutor in medieval English literature and English language. He specialised in Chaucer studies, but also taught Modern Irish Literature, especially poetry. His former students include the actress Rosamund Pike, the journalist and satirist Ian Hislop, and the writers Alan Hollinghurst and Mick Imlah. O’Donoghue retired from teaching in 2011, but stayed with Wadham as an emeritus fellow. In 2019 he took over the editorship of the Wadham Gazette from his colleague, Geoffrey Brooker, the successor of the Wadham classicist James Morwood.

== Poetry ==
Bernard O'Donoghue’s first poetry collection was Razorblades and Pencils, published by John Fuller as “a beautiful green pamphlet" in 1982. Fuller, O'Donoghue’s colleague at Magdalen College, Oxford, was an English poet and novelist, who ran the college poetry society, the Florio Society of which O’Donoghue was a member. Fuller also ran a publishing operation “on an ancient, oily machine in his garage”, The Sycamore Press, which, in addition to O’Donoghue, also published more established poets such as W. H. Auden and Philip Larkin. This was followed by Poaching Rights, published in Ireland by Peter Fallon, "a marvellous, alert editor", at Gallery Press in 1987, then a second pamphlet, The Absent Signifier in 1990, published by another English poet, Peter Scupham, at his Mandeville Press in 1990.

O'Donoghue's next collection, The Weakness, was published by Chatto & Windus in 1992. O'Donaghue himself regarded this as his most significant work from the Magdalen years. When the next book, Gunpowder (Chatto & Windus, 1995), won the 1995 Whitbread prize for Poetry, he said: "I often think that people often give credit to the following book as it were: maybe the more substantial stuff in The Weakness was rewarded by an accolade to the next book."

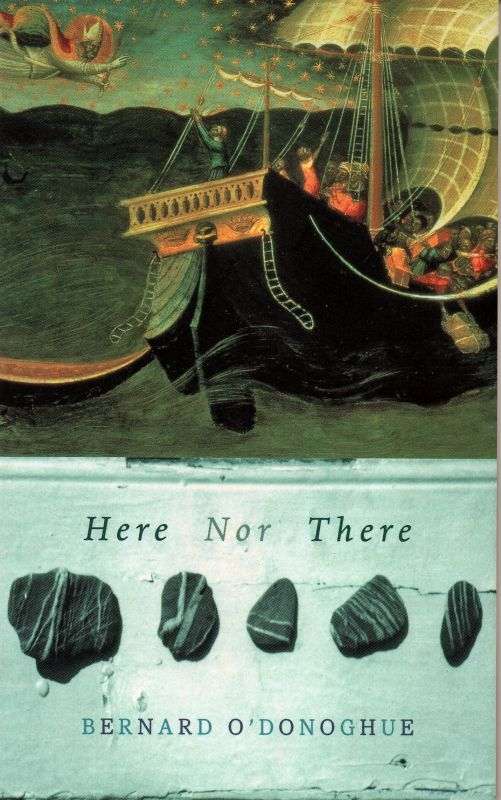
The medieval painting St Nicholas Rebukes the Tempest by Bicci di Lorenzo on the cover of Here Nor There by Bernard O'Donoghue, Chatto & Windus, 1999

Here Nor There (Chatto & Windus, 1999) features the "popular and moving" Ter Conatus, first published in The Times Literary Supplement in 1997. This is a poem about a brother and sister who cannot touch each other. "The title, ter conatus (“having tried three times”), is taken from two moments in the Aeneid [books 2 & 6] when Aeneas tries and fails to embrace shades of lost loved ones: first, his wife Creusa; then his father Anchises. In O'Donoghue’s poem, the sister falls ill, and the brother tries three times to touch her. "Three times the hand fell back, and took its place,/ Unmoving at his side."

The painting O’Donoghue chose for the cover of Here Nor There is St Nicholas Rebuking the Tempest by Bicci di Lorenzo (ca. 1425). This was one of three Chatto covers featuring a work of Medieval art, a nod to the inspiration found by the author in the Medieval, and earlier Anglo-Saxon elegies such as The Seafarer and The Wanderer, "which he has loved since he first encountered them as part of his primary degree programme. They are, he says, 'his model for the perfectly-formed short poem'".

Death recurs throughout O’Donoghue’s poetry, notably in Outliving, his last book for Chatto & Windus (2003) This collection starts with The Day I Outlived My Father with its bleak opening lines: Yet no one sent me flowers, or even/ asked me out for a drink. This poem features regularly in poetry readings by the author, along with The Iron Age Boat at Caumatruish, In Millstreet Hospital and Shells of Galice. When O’Donoghue and Faber & Faber collaborated on his Selected Poems (2008), these four favourites were the core to which they added poems from the previous collections for a total of 100 works "often recalling the rural Cork of his upbringing as seen against the exile of his adulthood, ever alive to the desire but impossibility of return."

The Anglo-Saxon motif returns in O’Donoghue’s next book, Farmer's Cross (Faber & Faber 2011). "One of the collection's highlights is O'Donoghue's masterly translation of the Old English lyric The Wanderer". Both this, and the next collection, The Seasons of Cullen Church (Faber & Faber 2016), were shortlisted for the T. S. Eliot Prize. In The Seasons of Cullen Church, O’Donoghue’s father reappears (in Meeting in the Small Hours), only to leave with the fateful words: "'Time to go back,' he said./ And I don't know if I will get away again.'"

The Irish poet Brendan Kennelly once said that “O'Donoghue's poetic world is one where stories are more important than ideas.” O’Donoghue agreed: "He's right. He's always right. You'd like to think that some idea comes out of the story - but the story is always primary."

== Other works ==
O’Donoghue has contributed to the discourse on modern poetry with two studies of Seamus Heaney. The first was Seamus Heaney and the Language of Poetry (1995), "a pioneering study of Heaney", followed in 2008 by The Cambridge Companion to Seamus Heaney. One of the few Cambridge Companions about a living writer, this comprises thirteen critical essays (Heaney and the Feminine, and so on), with an introduction by O’Donoghue, in which he points to the “political undercurrents that shape Heaney's work: he writes that Seeing Things (1991) ‘must be seen in the context of an improvement in the political situation in Northern Ireland, culminating in the 1994 IRA Ceasefire.’"

Meanwhile his C. Day-Lewis: The Golden Bridle, (co-Edited with Albert Gelpi, Oxford University Press, 2017) attempts to restore the reputation of “one of the major figures in twentieth-century English poetry by any objective measure” by presenting a selection of his prose writings.

O’Donoghue’s translations include A Stay in a Sanatorium and other poetry by Zbyněk Hejda (Southword Editions, 2005), a selection of poems from the contemporary Czeck writer, described by the Irish Times as "a voice out of the grand tradition of central European poetics." His next project was a new translation in verse of Sir Gawain and the Green Knight (Penguin Books, 2006), in which, Nicholas Lezard writes, "he has done justice to one of the first great works of literature in the language."

Two early medieval anthologies by O'Donoghue were The Courtly Love Tradition (Manchester University Press, 1982) and the related Thomas Hoccleve Selected Poems (Fyfield Books, 1982). He moved on from the medieval to the Irish with Oxford Irish Quotations (Oxford University Press, 1999). This included over two thousand quotations such as "The old literature of Ireland...has been the chief illumination of my imagination all my life." from W. B. Yeats.

== Awards ==
O'Donoghue received the 1995 Whitbread prize for Poetry for his collection Gunpowder, and the Cholmondeley Award in 2009. He has also been shortlisted multiple times for the T.S. Eliot Prize.

He was elected a Fellow of the Royal Society of Literature in 1999. He succeeded Seamus Heaney as Honorary President of the Irish Literary Society of London in 2014.

== Bibliography ==
=== Poetry ===
- Razorblades and Pencils (Sycamore Press, 1984)
- Poaching Rights (Gallery, 1987)
- The Absent Signifier (Mandeville, 1990)
- The Weakness (Chatto & Windus, 1991)
- Gunpowder (Chatto & Windus, 1995)
- Here Nor There (Chatto & Windus, 1999)
- Outliving (Chatto & Windus, 2003)
- Selected Poems (Faber and Faber, 2008)
- Farmers Cross (Faber and Faber, 2011)
- The Seasons of Cullen Church (Faber and Faber, 2016)

=== Other ===
- The Courtly Love Tradition (compiler) (Manchester University Press, 1982)
- Thomas Hoccleve Selected Poems (editor) (Fyfield Books, 1982)
- Seamus Heaney and the Language of Poetry (Prentice Hall, 1995)
- Oxford Irish Quotations (editor) (Oxford University Press, 1999)
- Zbyněk Hejda: A Stay in a Sanatorium and other poetry (translator) (Southword Editions, 2005)
- Sir Gawain and the Green Knight (verse translation) (Penguin, 2006)
- The Cambridge Companion to Seamus Heaney (Cambridge University Press, 2008)
- Reading Chaucer's Poems – A Guided Selection (Faber and Faber, 2015)
- Oxford Poets: Anthology Series (co-Edited with David Constantine) (Carcanet Press, 2000, 2004, 2009 and 2010)
- C. Day-Lewis: The Golden Bridle (co-Edited with Albert Gelpi) (Oxford University Press, 2017)
