= Richard Shephard =

British composer (1949–2021)

Richard James Shephard MBE, DL, FRSCM (20 March 1949 – 20 February 2021) was a British composer, educator, and Director of Development and Chamberlain of York Minster. He was acclaimed as one of the most significant composers of church music of his time.

== Education and musical career ==
Shephard was a chorister at Gloucester Cathedral, where the organist was then the composer Herbert Sumsion, before taking a degree at Corpus Christi College, Cambridge. While at Cambridge, Shephard studied under composer David Willcocks, Hugh Macdonald, the great expert on Berlioz, and Alan Ridout. He started his musical career as a lay vicar in Salisbury Cathedral Choir, and at this time was Conductor of the Salisbury Grand Opera Group, the Farrant Singers, Guest Conductor of the Salisbury Orchestral Society and musical director of various productions at the Salisbury Playhouse. It was at this time when he was greatly influenced by Richard Seal and Lionel Dakers, the former director of the Royal School of Church Music. An article published in 1987 in the Musical Times by Dakers, The RSCM: Past, Present...and Future, states that "Our policy is to provide music of quality and interest for every contingency which can then be absorbed into a choir's working repertory. Aston, Oxley, How, Shephard, and Sumsion feature in our catalogue because they measure up to these needs, produce what we want and what we can consequently sell in large numbers." Years later, in 2000, Shephard and Dakers would both contribute to The IAO Millennium Book, Thirteen essays About the Organ, a publication which comprises contemporary writings related to the organ and written by distinguished composers of the day. Shephard's article was entitled Composing for the Church today, in which he discussed current demands on church music composers in the 20th century. His first opera, The Turncoat was composed for the Salisbury International Arts Festival.

As a composer, he wrote operas, operettas, musicals, orchestral works, music for television, and chamber music but was perhaps best known for his choral works which are sung extensively around the world today, especially in churches and cathedrals in England and America. His compositions are frequently broadcast in the United Kingdom.

Shephard received commissions from numerous associations including the Three Choirs Festival, the Southern Cathedrals Festival, Woodard Schools, the Goldsmiths' Company and the Ryedale Festival. He was a Visiting Fellow at York University's music department and a visiting professor in the Music department of the University of the South (Sewanee); he has received honorary doctorates from both. For his "outstanding contribution to church music" he was awarded a Lambeth degree in music, and, in 2009, was granted Freedom of the City of York. Recently, he has had a place on the "Archbishop's Commission on Church Music" and on the "Church Music Commission on Cathedrals". Shephard was also a Fellow of the Royal School of Church Music, the highest honour which the RSCM offer.

In November 2009, Shephard was commissioned to write a piece for the commemoration of Henry Purcell's three hundred and fiftieth birthday by The National Centre of Early Music, Ode on the 350th Birthday of Mr Henry Purcell. The piece was performed in the Royal Albert Hall by five hundred school children who make up the Scunthorpe Co-operative Junior Choir which won the BBC Radio 3 Choir of the Year in 2008. Howard Goodall co-hosted the event.

In 1999 Shephard received a commission to write for the York Mystery Plays Millennium and in 2008 he coauthored York Minster: A Living Legacy with the Dean of York, Keith Jones, and Louise Ann Hampson.

== Career in education ==
As well as Shephard's prolific musical career, he also had a distinguished career in education. He became Head of Music at Godolphin School at the early age of 24, and then Deputy Head at Salisbury Cathedral School. In 1985, he moved to York, becoming headmaster of York Minster School and later became Chamberlain of York Minster. He remained headmaster of the school until 2004 when he stepped down, and was then Director of Development at York Minster, co-ordinating fundraising, and raising more than £20 million to restore the Great East Window. He was Chamberlain, in this role he served as cantor at evensong and mattins, leading the responses.

He was appointed MBE in the 2012 Queen's Birthday Honours list for his services to music and education. In the same year he was appointed a Deputy Lieutenant of North Yorkshire.

He died on 20 February 2021 at the age of 71, one month short of his 72nd birthday.

The Richard Shephard Music Foundation was set up in 2021 in memory of Dr Richard Shephard. The Foundation supports music in schools and is the owner of the royalties, manuscripts and printed works of Richard Shephard. For further information, visit: www.rsmf.org.uk.

== Selected works ==
=== Choral ===
Eucharistic settings:

- The Addington Service
- The Wiltshire Service
- Gloucester Cathedral
- Tisbury Service
- The Woodard Service
- The St Matthew's Service (for St Matthew's Church, Northampton)

Magnificat & Nunc Dimittis, for:

- Salisbury Cathedral
- Hereford Cathedral
- Liverpool Cathedral
- Lionel Dakers in memoriam
- Llandaff Cathedral
- Gloucester Cathedral

Anthems

- Let us now praise famous men
- The old order changeth
- Ye choirs of new Jerusalem
- The strife is o’er
- A Vision of Wheels
- O for a thousand tongues
- Last verses
- Never weather beaten sail
- Jesu dulcis memoria
- And didst thou travel light
- The birds
- Prayer for a new mother
- Let him who seeks
- We give immortal praise
- And when the builders
- Open for me the gates of righteousness
- Lord I have loved the habitation of thy house
- Adam lay y-bounden
- Who shall ascend
- Te Deum
- Out of the stillness
- The Secret of Christ
- Crossing the bar
- Jubilate Deo (for the celebrations on the 450th anniversary of the founding of Christ College, Brecon)

=== Opera ===
- The Turncoat
- The Dove and the Eagle
- Caedmon
- Good King Wenceslas
- The Shepherds' Play
- St Nicholas

=== Musicals ===
- All for Alice
- The Phantom Tollbooth
- Wind in the Willows
- Pride and Prejudice
- Solemn Parody
- Ernest
- A Christmas Carol
- Eek!
- Emil and the Detectives

=== Orchestral ===
- Overture – Mayday
- The Musicians of Bremen
- Six Shakespeare Songs
- Guildhall March

=== Oratorio ===
- Jonah
- Requiem
- St Luke Passion
- There Was Such Beauty (1991, Gloucester Cathedral)
- Christmas cantata
- Purcell birthday cantata (for the Albert Hall Schools Prom 2009)
