= In Exile (Sumsion) =

- Motet by Herbert Sumsion
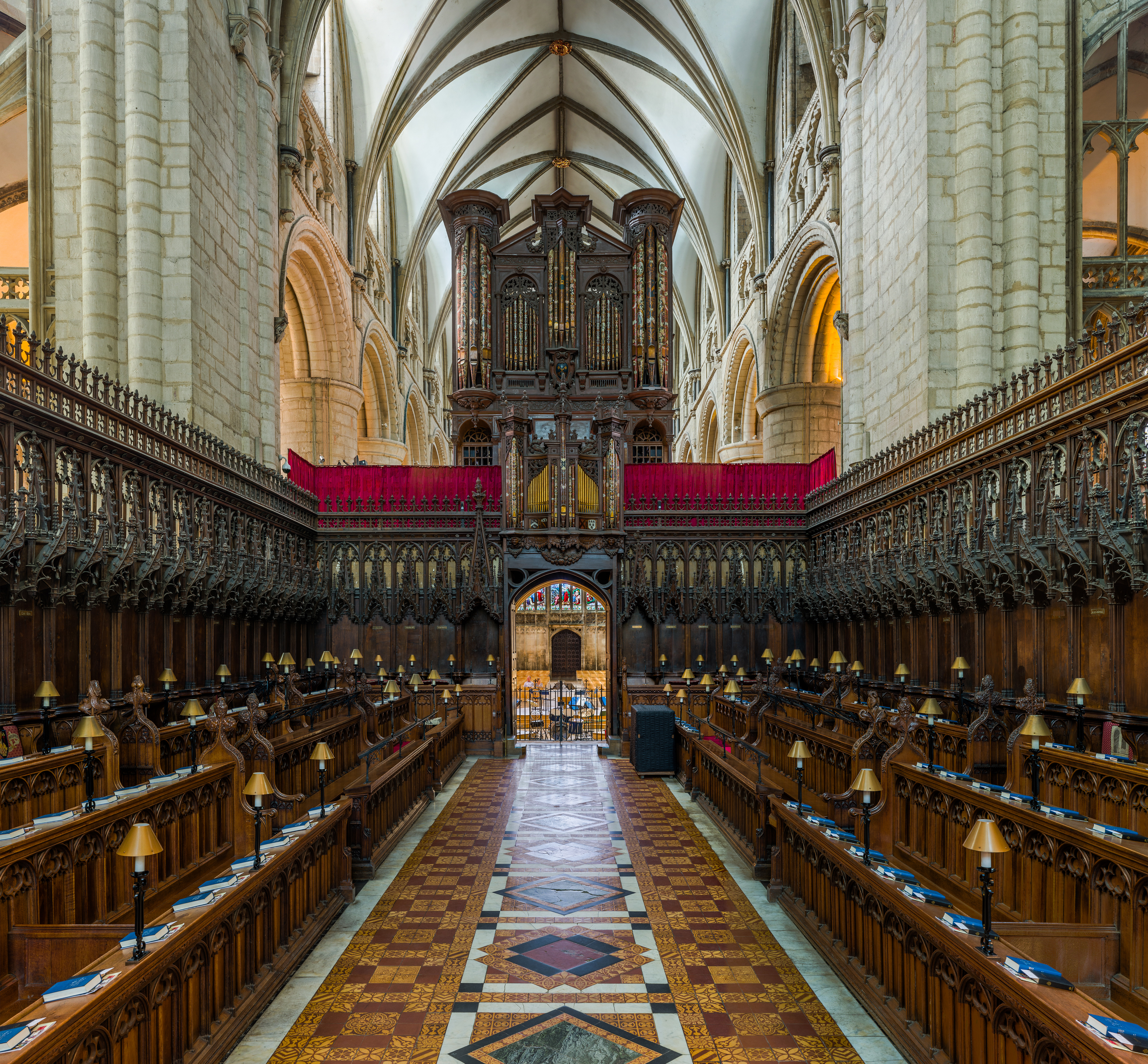
- Interior of Gloucester Cathedral
- Text: Psalms 137:1–6
- Language: English
- Performed: 1981

In Exile is a motet by Herbert Sumsion, who was for decades organist at Gloucester Cathedral. He set in 1981 a biblical text from Psalm 137 in English, beginning "By the waters of Babylon", scored for double choir a cappella. The motet was published by Basil Ramsey.

== History and text ==
Sumsion set in 1981 a translation of part of Psalm 137, expressing the distress of the Israelites in exile and captivity in Babylon after the destruction of the Solomon's Temple in Jerusalem. Sumsion selected Psalms 137:1–6 for his composition. It was premiered as part of [the Three Choirs Festival that year by the Donald Hunt Singers at the Gloucester Cathedral.

== Music ==
Sumsion knew Gloucester Cathedral's acoustics very well, as he was a chorister there from age nine, and then a pupil of Herbert Brewer, and cathedral organist from 1928 to 1967. He wrote the motet for a double choir, both SATB. It is written in B♭ minor, beginning in 3/4 time, marked Andante. Coro II (or Cantoris) begins with wave-like flowing motifs on a vowel "ah". Marked legato and pianissimo (pp); it is requested to be sung with almost closed lips and staggered breathing. After almost three measures, Coro I (or Decani) enters in homophony, marked doloroso (sorrowful). They carry the line "By the waters of Babylon we sat down and wept. The line is repeated with the choirs switching. For the continuation "when we remember'd thee O Zion", Coro I leads the text again. The scene between the captives and the guards is set with dramatic intensity, but the sorrowful beginning is repeated in text and music as a conclusion. A reviewer summarized that the "voices reproduce the effects of restless waters" in a piece which is "melodically rich, consistently interesting and deeply moving".

== Performance and recording ==
The psalm setting is suitable for Anglican Evensong, and for programs around the topic of exile. It was recorded in 1999 as part of English Choral and Organ Music, sung by Donald Hunt Singers conducted by Donald Hunt, along with works by Sumsion, Herbert Howells, Gerald Finzi and Edward Elgar. Hunt also conducted the Worcester Cathedral Choir in 2004 as part of the album An English Choral Tradition, along with Magnificat and Nunc dimittis for St Paul's Cathedral by Herbert Howells, anthems, and the Mass in G minor by Ralph Vaughan Williams.
