= Archipelago (disambiguation) =

An archipelago is a landform which consists of a chain or cluster of islands.

Archipelago(s) may also refer to:

== Film ==
- Archipelago (2010 film), a 2010 British film by Joanna Hogg
- Archipelago (2021 film), a 2021 Canadian film by Félix Dufour-Laperrière

== Literature ==
- Archipelago Books, a book publisher
- Archipelago (magazine), a British literary magazine
- Der Archipelagus ("The Archipelago"), a hymn written by Friedrich Hölderlin

== Military ==
- Archipelago Division, a Greek infantry formation active in 1916–1920
- Bismarck Archipelago Campaign, a military campaign from 15 December 1943 to 27 November 1944

== Music ==
- Archipelago, a 2012 album by Hidden Orchestra
- Archipelago (album), a live album by the American group, Land

== Places ==
- The Archipelago, a township in central Ontario, Canada
- Archipelago (Åland), a subdivision of Finland
- Duchy of the Archipelago, a maritime state created in the Aegean Sea (the Cyclades) in the aftermath of the Fourth Crusade

== Other uses ==
- Archipelago (restaurant), restaurant in Seattle, Washington
- Archipelago Exchange, an online stock exchange owned by the NYSE Group, abbreviation NYSE Arca
- Archipelago Philippine Ferries Corporation, a ferry company
- Archipelago Productions, an Australian film and theatre production company in Hobart, Tasmania, co-owned by Marta Dusseldorp
- Archipelago Tomorrow, a local right-wing French political movement
- Archipelagos (video game), a 1989 video game for the Atari ST, Amiga and PC

== See also ==
- The Gulag Archipelago, a novel about the Soviet slave labor and concentration camp system by Aleksandr Solzhenitsyn
