= Nunc dimittis (disambiguation) =

Nunc dimittis is a canticle from the New Testament. The canticle was often translated and set to music. Nunc dimittis and related translations may also refer to:

== Music ==
=== Latin ===
- Nunc dimittis (Pärt), a setting by Arvo Pärt (2001)

=== English ===
- List of English settings of Magnificats and Nunc dimittis, which includes
  - Magnificat and Nunc dimittis in D (Wood), a setting by Charles Wood (1898)
  - Magnificat and Nunc dimittis (Gloucester), a setting by Herbert Howells for Gloucester Cathedral (1947)
  - Magnificat and Nunc dimittis for St Paul's Cathedral, a setting by Herbert Howells for St Paul's Cathedral (1950)

=== German ===
- "Mit Fried und Freud ich fahr dahin", a hymn by Martin Luther (1524), on which several works are based, including
  - Mit Fried und Freud (Buxtehude), a funeral cantata by Dieterich Buxtehude (1674)
  - Mit Fried und Freud ich fahr dahin, BWV 125, a cantata for the feast of the Purification by Johann Sebastian Bach (1723)

== Other ==
- "Nunc Dimittis" (short story), a short story by Roald Dahl (1953)
