= Sarah Macdonald =

Sarah Macdonald may refer to:

- Sarah MacDonald (musician), Canadian-born organist and conductor, living in the UK
- Sarah Macdonald (journalist), Australian journalist, author and radio presenter
- Sarah MacDonald, a character in the TV series The River played by Katy Murphy
