= Andrew McNeillie =

British poet and literary editor (born 1946)

- Born: 12 August 1946 (age 80); Old Colwyn, Wales
- Education: Magdalen College, Oxford (BA)
- Occupation: Literature Editor of the Oxford University Press
- Father: John McNeillie

Andrew McNeillie (born 12 August 1946) is a British poet and literary editor.

== Early life and education ==
He was born in Old Colwyn, North Wales. He was educated in a local primary school, Colwyn Bay Grammar School, and Ysgol John Bright. He read English at Magdalen College, Oxford as a mature student from 1971 to 1973. He is the son of John McNeillie, also known as "Ian Niall".

== Career ==
His collection of poems Nevermore (2000), in the Oxford Poets series from Carcanet Press, was shortlisted for the Forward Prize for Best First Collection. His prose memoir An Aran Keening tells of his stay on Inis Mór, just short of a year through 1968 and 1969. It was published in 2001 by The Lilliput Press, Dublin, and in 2002 in the United States by the University of Wisconsin Press. Adam Nicolson, choosing his book of the year for 2002, in The Daily Telegraph wrote: ‘I enjoyed nothing more this year than An Aran Keening, Andrew McNeillie’s soft, sharp, funny and often heart-wrenchingly nostalgic account of the 11 months he spent on Inishmore, the biggest of the Aran Islands, in the late 1960s.’ Tim Robinson in The Irish Times wrote: ‘…McNeillie’s prose can be as pristine and effervescent as the sea’s edge on a summer beach….Aran is once again a larger place than it was.’

In 2000 McNeillie founded the Clutag Press, in Thame, Oxfordshire. It has issued limited edition works by Seamus Heaney, Tom Paulin, and Geoffrey Hill among others. Its literary archive is now collected exclusively by the Bodleian Library, Oxford University.

Between 1986 and 1994, McNeillie was the editor of the first four volumes of The Essays of Virginia Woolf, published as the critical edition by Hogarth Press (the sixth and final volume being issued in 2011). He was the Literature Editor of Oxford University Press between 2004 and 2009.

== Bibliography ==
=== Poetry ===
- Nevermore (Carcanet Press, 2000) ISBN 1-903039-02-9
- Now, Then (Carcanet Press, 2002) ISBN 1-903039-60-6
- Arkwork with Artwork (Clutag Press, 2006) ISBN 0-9547275-5-X
- Slower (Carcanet Press, 2006) ISBN 1-85754-828-0
- In Mortal Memory (Carcanet Press, 2010)
- Winter Moorings (Carcanet Press, 2014)
- Striking a Match in a Storm: New & Collected Poems (Carcanet, 2022)

=== Prose memoir ===
- An Aran Keening (Lilliput Press, 2001) ISBN 1-901866-63-7

=== Biography ===
- Ian Niall: Part of his Life (Clutag Press, 2007)

=== Editor ===
- The Essays of Virginia Woolf, Vols 1–4 (Hogarth Press, 1986–1994)
- Archipelago (Clutag Press, 2007–present)

== Related links ==
- Clutag Press website.
- Andrew McNeillie on the OUP website.
