= Basil Harwood =

English organist and composer (1859–1949)

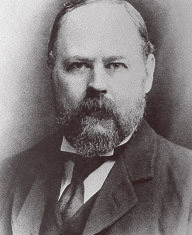
- Born: 11 April 1859; Woodhouse, Gloucestershire, England
- Died: 3 April 1949 (aged 89); London
- Occupations: Organist; Composer; Hymn writer
- Organizations: Ely Cathedral; Christ Church Cathedral, Oxford

Basil Harwood (11 April 1859 – 3 April 1949) was an organist and composer in the English church music tradition, best known today for his liturgical works, particularly his anthem O How Glorious is the Kingdom (1898) and his Service in A flat (1892), which still remain popular in English churches. He wrote numerous hymn tunes, several of which became well-known including Luckington ("Let All the World in Every Corner Sing") and Thornbury ("O Jesus I Have Promised" and "Thy hand, O God, has guided").

== Early life ==
Basil Harwood was born on 11 April 1859 at Woodhouse, Olveston, Gloucestershire, the youngest child of Edward Harwood (1818–1907), a banker. His mother Mary, née Sturge (1840–1867), was of Quaker extraction, and Harwood was brought up in that faith until a switch to Anglicanism in 1869 following his father's second marriage.

== Education ==
As a boy, Harwood attended Walton Lodge preparatory school in Clevedon, followed in 1864 by Charterhouse. In 1876 he won a scholarship to Trinity College, Oxford, where he was placed in the second class in classical moderations (1879) and the third in modern history (1881). He took his music degree (BMus) in 1880, studying with C. W. Corfe, then the university's Choragus.

After Oxford, Harwood spent a year in Leipzig studying composition with Jadassohn and the organ with Papperitz.

== Career ==
Harwood's first professional position was organist of St Barnabas', Pimlico in 1883, a post he held until 1887. He then served as organist at Ely Cathedral for five years, followed by a final move to Oxford in 1892 where he remained organist of Christ Church Cathedral until his retirement in 1909.

He became Doctor of Music (DMus) in 1896, submitting as his doctoral work a setting of Psalm 86, Inclina domine.

During his time in Oxford Harwood acted as conductor of the Oxford Orchestral Association (1892–8), and became the first conductor of the Oxford Bach Choir in 1896. He held the position of Precentor of Keble College between 1892 and 1903, and was Choragus at the university from 1900 until his retirement. He edited The Oxford Hymn Book (1908) as well as acting as an Oxford examiner for several academic years between 1900 and 1915.

== Works ==
Harwood's musical works sit within the 'English' tradition established by Wesley, Stainer, Parry and Stanford. He is best known today for his liturgical works, particularly his anthem O How Glorious is the Kingdom (1898), notable for its organ accompaniment and (said Henry Ley) "a coda based on a haunting melody of great beauty". Ley also identified When the Son of Man Shall Come (1900) as one of his finest anthems. There are nine liturgical settings: the Service in A flat (1892) is still popular with English choirs, while the lesser known Service in E minor (1919) is his most extensive and mature. He wrote numerous hymn tunes, several of which became well-known including Luckington ("Let All the World in Every Corner Sing"), Thornbury ("O Jesus I Have Promised" and "Thy hand, O God, has Guided"), and St Audrey ("Sing ye Faithful, Sing with Gladness").

He produced a number of choral works, often for church festivals, including Inclina Domine (Gloucester Festival 1898); As by the Streams of Babylon (Oxford Bach Choir 1907); Jesus, Thy Boundless Love (St Paul's Cathedral 1909); Song on May Morning (Leeds Festival 1913); Love Incarnate (Gloucester Festival 1925); Ye Choirs of New Jerusalem (Gloucester Festival 1928); and Sacrifice Triumphant (1939). There are also some part songs and solo songs.

Harwood's organ style was distinctive and technically challenging. He made significant contributions to the repertory of organ works for the concert hall, most requiring considerable virtuoso technique. The Organ Sonata in C sharp minor, op. 5, composed in 1886, was called by critics "the finest organ sonata composed by an Englishman". Other notable organ works include the Dithyramb, op.7 (1892, much admired by Edward Elgar who told Harwood he always had a desire to score it), the Paean (1903, first performed by Walter Parratt at the opening of the reconstructed organ in York Minster, and later recorded by Reginald Goss-Custard at Liverpool Cathedral), and the Toccata, op.49 (1930). There is also a Sonata for chamber organ and a full scale Concerto in D major for organ & orchestra, op. 24, which the composer played at the Gloucester Festival in 1910. His love of plainchant and hymn tunes is often evident in his organ works.

== Personal life ==
Harwood was deeply religious and was said to have had a quiet, gentle, and reserved personality. On 27 December 1899 he married one of his former pupils, Mabel Ada Jennings (1871–1974). The couple had two sons, John Edward Godfrey (born 1900) and Basil Anthony (born 1903). In 1909 Harwood took early retirement and returned to Gloucestershire to manage his family estate there.

In 1936 Harwood and his wife moved to London, where they remained except for some temporary absences in Bournemouth and then Shiplake during the war. Harwood died on 3 April 1949 at his home, 50 Courtfield Gardens, Kensington, aged 89. His ashes were interred in St Barnabas's Church, Pimlico.

== Bibliography ==
- Dibble, Jeremy (20 January 2001). "Harwood, Basil". Grove Music Online. doi:10.1093/gmo/9781561592630.article.12494.
- Dibble, Jeremy (23 September 2004). "Harwood, Basil (1859–1949)". Oxford Dictionary of National Biography (online ed.). Oxford University Press. doi:10.1093/ref:odnb/33749. (Subscription, Wikipedia Library access or UK public library membership required.)
- "Harwood, Basil". Who's Who. 29 March 2021. doi:10.1093/ww/9780199540884.013.U226553.
- Ley, Henry (December 1959). "Basil Harwood (1859–1949)". Ley: 682-3. doi:10.2307/938464.

Cultural offices
Preceded by Edmund Thomas Chipp	Organist and Master of the Choristers of Ely Cathedral; 1887–1892	Succeeded by Thomas Tertius Noble
Preceded by Charles Harford Lloyd	Organist and Master of the Choristers of Christ Church Cathedral, Oxford; 1892–1909	Succeeded by Henry Ley
