= A Tiger Walks =

1964 film by Norman Tokar

- Theatrical release poster
- Directed by: Norman Tokar
- Screenplay by: Lowell S. Hawley
- Based on: the book by Ian Niall
- Produced by: Walt Disney; Bill Anderson (co-producer)
- Starring: Brian Keith; Vera Miles; Pamela Franklin; Sabu; Edward Andrews; Una Merkel; Peter Brown
- Cinematography: William Snyder, A.S.C.
- Edited by: Grant K. Smith, A.C.E.
- Music by: Buddy Baker
- Production company: Walt Disney Productions
- Distributed by: Buena Vista Distribution Co., Inc.
- Release date: March 12, 1964
- Running time: 91 minutes
- Country: United States
- Language: English
- Box office: est. $1,600,000 (US/ Canada)

A Tiger Walks is a 1964 American drama film directed by Norman Tokar and starring Brian Keith and Vera Miles. Based on the 1960 novel of the same name by Ian Niall, it was produced by Walt Disney Productions. It was Indian-born actor Sabu's last film, which was released a few months after his death.

== Plot ==
Raja, a mistreated Bengal tiger, escapes from a traveling circus, and it hides in the woods surrounding the small town of Scotia. The new arrival starts a panic, and the townsfolk want Raja killed with the exception of Julie Williams, the sheriff's daughter. Julie wishes to capture Raja and put it in a zoo. To raise enough money to purchase Raja from the circus, she starts a campaign with the slogan "save the tiger" to rally children across the nation in the tiger's defense, resulting in national attention brought to the sleepy town. However, she, her father, and an Indian tiger trainer first need to find Raja before the National Guard, who are under orders to shoot the tiger on sight. Ultimately the tiger is tranquilized and placed in a zoo.

== Cast ==
- Brian Keith as Sheriff Pete Williams
- Vera Miles as Dorothy Williams
- Pamela Franklin as Julie Williams
- Sabu as Ram Singh
- Edward Andrews as Governor Robbins
- Una Merkel as Mrs. Watkins
- Peter Brown as Vern Goodman
- Kevin Corcoran as Tom Hadley
- Frank McHugh as Bill Watkins
- Connie Gilchrist as Liddy Lewis
- Arthur Hunnicutt as Frank Lewis
- Theodore Marcuse as Josef Pietz
- Merry Anders as Betty Collins
- Frank Aletter as Joe Riley
- Jack Albertson as Sam Grant
- Donald May as Captain Anderson

== See also ==
- List of American films of 1964
