= Oxford Bach Choir =

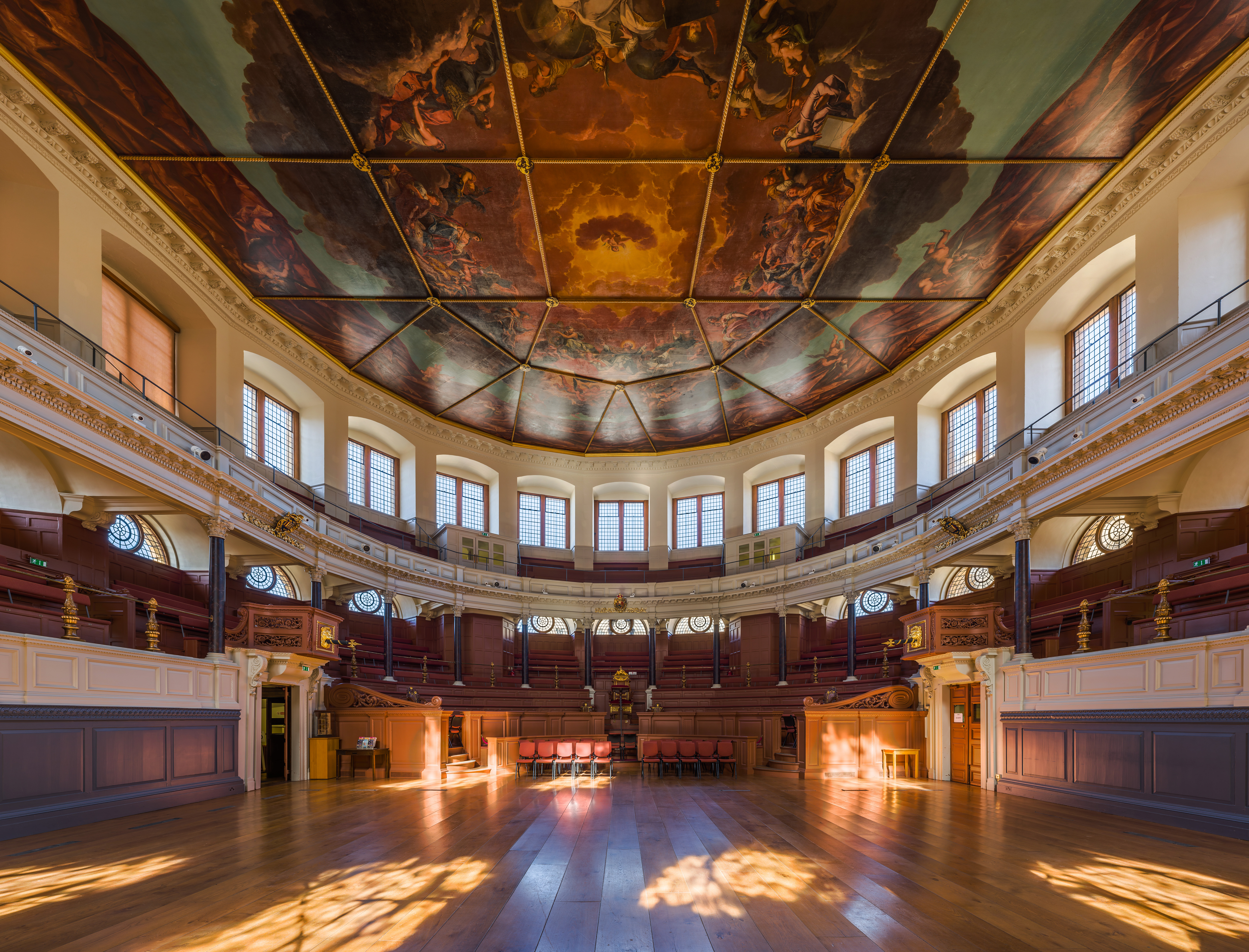
Interior view of the Sheldonian Theatre of Oxford University, where the Oxford Back Choir holds most of its concerts.

The Oxford Bach Choir is an amateur choir based in Oxford, England. Founded by Basil Harwood in 1896 to further the music of J. S. Bach in Oxford, the Choir merged in 1905 with the Oxford Choral & Philharmonic Society, whose origins can be traced back to 1819. Oxford Bach Choir therefore has a choral tradition which extends back over two centuries. The choir performs most of its concerts in the Sheldonian Theatre (designed by Christopher Wren) in central Oxford, but also performs in St John the Evangelist Church, Oxford, located on the Iffley Road.

== Overview ==
The Oxford Bach Choir is a large mixed-voice choir, with around 120 members. The range of music covered is diverse, from the works of Bach and the classical repertoire to contemporary works. Oxford Bach Choir has always had a mix of town and gown singers. Rehearsals and concerts are scheduled so that students, academics and professionals are all able to participate in the choir's programmes. The choir enjoys good relationships both with Oxford colleges and with businesses in the city. New members, drawn from throughout Oxfordshire and adjacent counties, are encouraged to apply to join the choir at the start of each term.

Oxford Bach Choir gives at least three concerts every season, at the end of each academic term in December, March and June, occasions that attract audiences of up to 800 people. It also gives a carol concert each December in the Sheldonian Theatre, most recently in association with Oxfordshire Young Singers, Oxfordshire County Youth Choir and Oxfordshire Youth Brass Ensemble.

For its main concerts the choir is regularly accompanied by a top professional orchestras, such as the Royal Philharmonic Orchestra, the Philharmonia Orchestra, the London Mozart Players and the City of Birmingham Symphony Orchestra.

In 2018 the choir appointed a new principal conductor, Benjamin Nicholas, who is also director of music at Merton College, Oxford.

Recordings have been made of some of the concerts performed by the choir.

== Conductors ==
- Basil Harwood (1896-1901)
- Hugh Allen (1901–26)
- William Henry Harris (1926–33)
- Thomas Armstrong (1934–55)
- Sydney Watson (1955–70)
- Jack Westrup (1970–71)
- Simon Preston (1971–74)
- Edward Olleson (1975–77)
- Christopher Robinson (1977–97)
- Nicholas Cleobury (1997–2015)
- David Crown (2016–17)
- Benjamin Nicholas (2018-)

== Notable members ==
- Adrian Boult - English conductor who established the BBC Symphony Orchestra and became the principal conductor of the London Philharmonic Orchestra.
- Vera Brittain - Writer, pacifist and feminist. Author of Testament of Youth.
- Dorothy L. Sayers - English "Golden Age" crime writer, classicist and poet. Creator of Lord Peter Wimsey.
- Edward Heath - Prime Minister of the United Kingdom 1970-1974.
- Basil Hume - English Bishop and Cardinal of the Roman Catholic Church.
- Margaret Thatcher (nee Roberts) - Prime Minister of the United Kingdom 1979-1990.
- Frederick Geoffrey Lawrence QC – lawyer who successfully defended suspected serial killer John Bodkin Adams in 1957.
- Peter Gilliver - associate editor of the Oxford English Dictionary.
