= Thy hand, O God, has guided =

English hymn

- Hymn
- Key: D major
- Genre: choral music
- Text: Edward Plumptre
- Language: English
- Meter: 7.6.7.6 D
- Melody: "Thornbury" by Basil Harwood
- Published: 1898

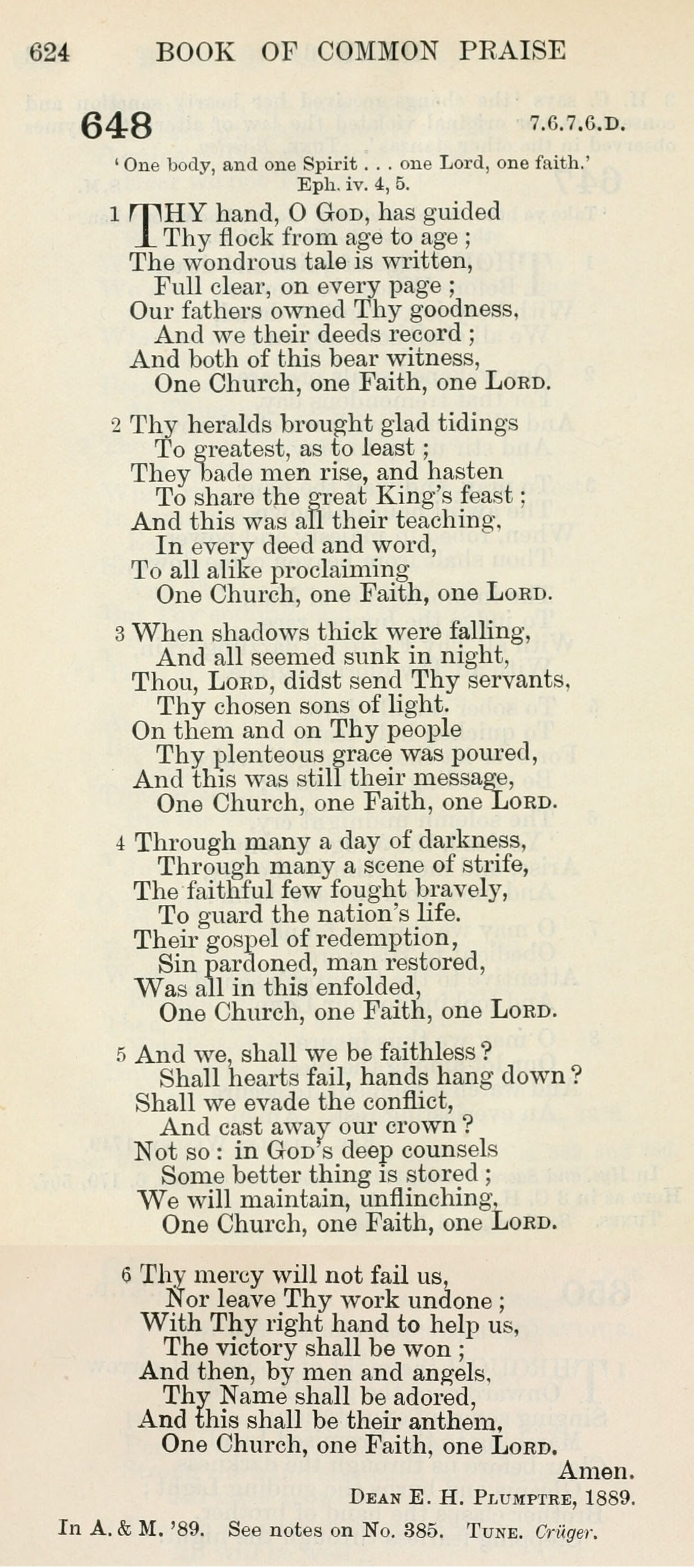

Thy hand, O God, has guided (also Your hand, O God, has guided) is a Christian hymn with words by Edward Plumptre and music by Basil Harwood.

== History ==
Edward Plumptre first created the lyrics to the hymn as a text called "Church Defense" and published it in his Lazarus and Other Poems in the second edition in 1865. The text was published in 1889 as one of the supplementary hymns to Hymns Ancient and Modern by Charles Steggall.

=== Use in hymnbooks ===
The has been and is published in more than fifty hymnbooks, including those of a number of significant denominations, such as the Church of England; the United Church of Canada and the Presbyterian Church in Canada (Book of Praise 1972 version, as Thy hand, O God, has guided; and the current Book of Praise 1997 version, as Your hand, O God, has guided); the Evangelical Lutheran Church in America; the Seventh-day Adventist Church; and the New Apostolic Church.

== Structure ==
The hymn has a meter of 7.6.7.6 D, and has the well-known refrain One Church, One Faith, One Lord.

== Recordings ==
=== Audio ===
- On Aled: Music From the TV Series (1987). Aled Jones, with the BBC Welsh Chorus. 10 Records, AJCD 3.
- On The English Hymn 1: Christ Triumphant (1999). Wells Cathedral Choir, Malcolm Archer (conductor). Hyperion Records, CDP12101.
- On Hymns and Anthems From Windsor Castle (2001). Choir of St George's Chapel, Windsor Castle. Word Entertainment, WMD028.
- On The Complete New English Hymnal, Disc 12 (2003). Choir of St Edmundsbury Cathedral. Priory Records Ltd.

=== Video ===
- Thornbury-Thy Hand, O God, Has Guided on YouTube. Presented as part of the August 14, 2011, episode "Fife’s Finest" of the BBC programme “Songs of Praise”, filmed at Dunfermline Abbey (a present-day Church of Scotland congregation).
