= Intimations of Immortality (Finzi) =

1950 composition by Gerald Finzi

Intimations of Immortality, Op. 29, an ode for tenor, chorus, and orchestra, is one of the best-known works by English composer Gerald Finzi. It is a setting of nine of the eleven stanzas (all but the seventh and eighth) of William Wordsworth's "Ode: Intimations of Immortality", cast as a single continuous movement of 45 minutes duration. Finzi began composing the work in the late 1930s, but did not complete it until 1950, just before it was performed on 5 September at the Three Choirs Festival in Gloucester Cathedral, with Eric Greene as soloist and Herbert Sumsion conducting.

Music critics and historians have pointed out there are obvious stylistic similarities between portions of Intimations and William Walton's 1931 cantata Belshazzar's Feast:

On hearing the Intimations of Immortality again, I find the Waltonisms (obvious Belshazzar) puzzling in the 'Now while the birds' section and its recapitulation. Is it deliberately allusive or simply an influence running round in his head at the time? The latter is hard to believe, but the former seems more puzzling still as the reference (if such it be) can hardly be seen as apt.

== Recordings ==
- Ian Partridge, Guildford Philharmonic Choir & Orchestra, Vernon Handley. Lyrita SRCD.238. 1975, reissued 2007
- Philip Langridge, Royal Liverpool Philharmonic and Choir, Richard Hickox. EMI CDC 7 49913 2. 1989, reissued 2001
- James Gilchrist, Bournemouth Symphony Orchestra and Chorus, David Hill. Naxos 8.557863
