= Louis Halsey =

English composer, arranger and choral conductor (born 1929)

Louis Arthur Owen Halsey (born 1929) is an English composer, arranger and choral conductor. He founded the Elizabethan Singers and the Louis Halsey Singers.

== Career ==
Halsey was born in London in 1929. He began singing as a chorister at All Saints, Margaret Street in London, just before the outbreak of war in 1939, though he was soon evacuated to Oxfordshire. He studied music at the University of Cambridge and sang in King's College Choir under Boris Ord.

He founded the Elizabethan Singers in 1953, which continued until 1966; the Thames Chamber Choir in 1964; and in 1967 the Louis Halsey Singers. These groups have sung in many first performances - including specially commissioned works by composers including John Gardner, Jonathan Harvey, Herbert Howells, Anthony Milner, Bernard Naylor, Alan Ridout, Edmund Rubbra and John Tavener - and have toured internationally. He has also conducted the Allegri Singers, a chamber vocal group specializing in 20th century music.

Halsey's professional posts have included nearly 20 years at the BBC as a music producer, the University of Illinois (Professor of Music and Head of the Choral Department), the Royal Liverpool Philharmonic Choir (guest chorus master), and at Regent's University London, where he was Director of Music.

With Basil Ramsey he co-edited the carol book Sing Nowell: 51 Carols by Contemporary British Composers (1963). In the 1950s, 1960s and 1970s his various choirs made a series of key recordings for the Argo, Decca and L’Oiseau-Lyre labels, some of which have since been reissued. He has composed anthems and other church music.
