= Herbert Kennedy Andrews =

English composer and organist (1904–1965)

Herbert Kennedy Andrews FRCO (10 August 1904 – 10 October 1965) was a composer and organist based in the East Riding of Yorkshire, and Oxford.

== Life ==
He was the son of Arthur Macdonald Andrews and Sarah Black, born in Comber, County Down and educated at Bedford School.

He gained two doctorates in music, one from New College, Oxford, and another from Trinity College, Dublin. He gained his Fellowship of the Royal College of Organists in July 1935.

He was a lecturer in music at New College, Oxford and Balliol College, Oxford, and also at the Royal College of Music.

On 10 October 1965, Dr Andrews died whilst playing for the inaugural and dedication service of the new Harrison & Harrison organ of Trinity College, Oxford, having been consultant for the project.

== Appointments ==
- Organist at Beverley Minster, 1933 – 1938
- Organist at New College, Oxford, 1938 – 1956

== Compositions ==
He wrote:

- A Magnificat and Nunc Dimittis in D.
- A Magnificat and Nunc Dimittis in G.
- Ah See the Fair Chivalry Come
- A Glass of Beer
- He Wants Not Friends
- The Spacious Firmament on High (Joseph Addison)
- When cats run home

Cultural offices
Preceded by Sydney Watson	Organist and Master of the Choristers of New College, Oxford; 1938–1956	Succeeded by Meredith Davies
