= Ian Niall =

Scottish writer, 1916–2002

Ian Niall (7 November 1916 – 24 June 2002), born John Kincaid McNeillie, was a writer from Galloway, Scotland. He wrote works under both these names.

== Biography ==
He was born in Old Kilpatrick, to parents from the Machars in South West Scotland. He moved back to Galloway at 18 months old, and the area formed a basis for his early fiction.

In the 1940s, he moved to North Wales, where his son, the writer Andrew McNeillie, was born.

Niall died in Chesham, Buckinghamshire, in south-east England.

=== Films ===
The 1951 film No Resting Place, based on Niall's novel, was directed by Paul Rotha and produced by Colin Lesslie Productions. It stars Michael Gough.

The 1964 film A Tiger Walks, directed by Norman Tokar and starring Vera Miles and Brian Keith, is also based on Niall's works.

== Works ==
- Wigtown Ploughman: Part of His Life (1939, Putnam, as John McNeillie; 2012, Birlinn Limited ISBN 978 1 78027 086 9)
- Glasgow Keelie (1940, Putnam, as John McNeillie)
- Morryharn Farm (1941, Putnam, as John McNeillie)
- No Resting Place (1948, Heinemann). The first under the name "Ian Niall", filmed by Paul Rotha
- Tune on a Melodeon (1948, Heinemann)
- Foxhollow (1949, Heinemann)
- The Poacher's Handbook (1950, Heinemann)
- The Deluge (1951, Heinemann)
- Fresh Woods (1951, Heinemann; 2012, Little Toller Books)
- Pastures New (1952, Heinemann; 2012, Little Toller Books)
- The Boy Who Saw Tomorrow (1952, Heinemann)
- A Tiger Walks (1960, Heinemann)
- The New Poacher's Handbook (1960, Heinemann)
- Trout from the Hills (1961, Heinemann)
- The Harmless Albatross(1961, Heinemann)
- Hey Delaney! (1962, Heinemann)
- The Game Keeper (1965, Heinemann)
- The Country Blacksmith (1966, Heinemann)
- A Galloway Childhood (1967, Heinemann)
- A Fowler's World: An Account of Days on the Marsh and Estuary (1968, Heinemann)
- A Galloway Shepherd (1970, Heinemann)
- The Village Policeman (1971, Heinemann)
- Around My House (1973, Heinemann)
- A London Boyhood (1974, Heinemann)
- One Man and His Dogs (1975, Heinemann)
- To Speed the Plough(1977, Heinemann)
- The Idler's Companion (1978, Heinemann)
- The Forester (1979, Heinemann)
- Portrait of a Country Artist Charles Tunnicliffe R.A. 1901–1979 (1980 Gollancz)
- Tunnicliffe's Countryside (1983, Clive Holloway Books)
- Feathered Friends (1984, Chatto)
- Country Matters (1984, Gollancz)
- Ian Niall's Complete Angler (1986, Heinemann)
- Ian Niall's Country Notes (1987, Octopus Books)
- English Country Traditions (1990 V&A)
- The Way of a Countryman (1965 and 1993, Heinemann)
- Country Life (1953–1993, regular column as Ian Niall)

== External links and references ==
- Part of his life
- Obituary in the Glasgow Herald
- Entry on Ian Niall.
