= Reginald Goss-Custard =

English organist and composer (1877–1956)

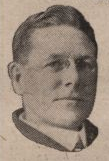
- Reginald Goss-Custard, circa 1925
- Born: 29 March 1877
- Died: 13 June 1956 (aged 79)
- Occupation: Composer

Edward Reginald Herbert Goss-Custard (born 29 March 1877 in St Leonards-on-Sea, died 13 June 1956) was an English organist and composer.

The brother of the organist Harry Goss-Custard, he was largely self-taught. He held several organist positions in London, including twelve years at St Margaret's, Westminster from 1902 to 1914, and gave concerts at the Bishopsgate Institute.

Among his compositions were Chelsea Fayre, an elegy, an idyll, a March in F, a Fantasia in F and a Serenade in A for the organ. He also wrote organ arrangements including Tchaikovsky's The Nutcracker and the overtures to Beethoven's Egmont, Bizet's Carmen, Hérolds Zampa, Mozart's Le nozze di Figaro and Suppé's Dichter und Bauer.
