= Sydney Watson =

English church musician (1903–1991)

Sydney Watson OBE (3 September 1903 – 17 February 1991) was an English church musician who was the organist of Christ Church Cathedral, Oxford and conductor of the Oxford Bach Choir from 1955 to 1970.

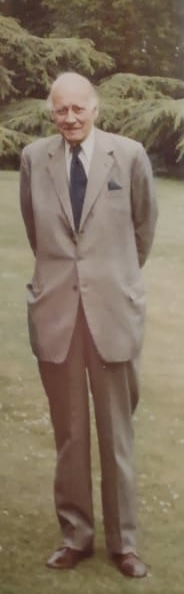
Sydney Watson OBE at home in 1982

== Biography ==
Watson was born in Denton, Lancashire. He attended Warwick School, before studying at the Royal College of Music (RCM) and Keble College, Oxford, graduating with a BA in 1925, a B.Mus. in 1926, an MA in 1928, and a D.Mus. in 1932. He then took up a position at Stowe School, Buckingham, followed by appointments as music master at Radley College, Oxfordshire, organist at New College, Oxford, from 1933 to 1938, and musical director at Winchester College, from 1938 until 1945. He moved to become precentor at Eton College, leaving in 1955 to take up a post as music lecturer at Christ Church, Oxford, and organist of Christ Church Cathedral, Oxford—posts he held until 1970. He was professor of organ at the RCM from 1946 to 1971, and conducted the Oxford Bach Choir between 1955 and 1970.

In 1965 he conducted the first performance of Walton's The Twelve, and in 1967 directed what was probably the first liturgical performance of Taverner's Missa Corona Spinea for 400 years. He composed an evening service, Magnificat and Nunc Dimittis in E, which is regularly sung in the evening liturgy of the Anglican Church, and while at Winchester composed the hymn tune "Morestead". The tune "Guarda" he contributed to 'More Hymns for Today' for the hymn 'Lord of all, to whom alone' written by Cyril Alington. He was appointed an OBE in 1970 for his services to music. A private and undated recording exists of Sydney Watson conducting Sir Arnold Bax' Concertante for Piano (Left Hand) and Orchestra with Douglas Fox as soloist and an orchestra called the Oxford Orchestral Society.

Cultural offices
Preceded by John Dykes Bower	Organist and Master of the Choristers of New College, Oxford; 1933–1938	Succeeded by Herbert Andrews
Preceded by Thomas Armstrong	Organist and Master of the Choristers of Christ Church Cathedral, Oxford; 1955–1970	Succeeded by Simon Preston
