= Archipelago (magazine) =

Magazine of British and Irish writing

- Editor: Andrew McNeillie
- Categories: Literary magazine
- Frequency: Variable
- First issue: 2007
- Company: Clutag Press
- Country: United Kingdom
- Language: English
- Website: www.clutagpress.com/product-category/archipelago/
- OCLC: 234083534

Archipelago is a literary magazine that publishes non-fiction and poetry on the subject of the British Isles. It is edited by Andrew McNeillie and published by Clutag Press. In 2021, The Lilliput Press published an anthology of contributions to the magazine between 2007 and 2019, edited by Nicholas Allen and Fiona Stafford and entitled Archipelago: A reader. Notable contributors to the magazine include Seamus Heaney, Robert Macfarlane, and Terry Eagleton.

Although several sources, including the aforementioned anthology, state that Archipelago stopped publishing in 2019, as of April 2023 new issues are still being published.
