= Adrian Batten =

English composer and organist

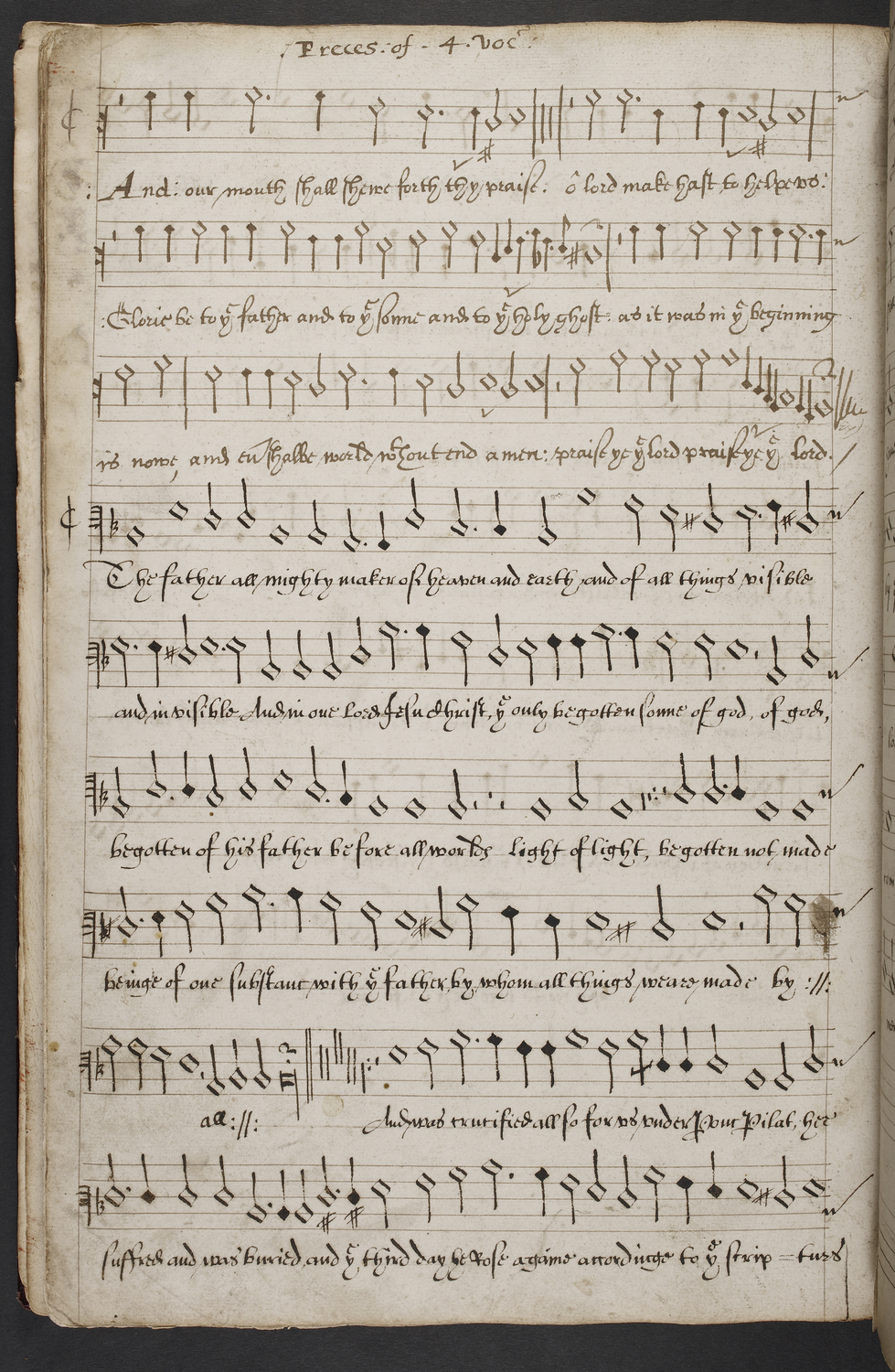
Autograph manuscript of Preces for 4 voices.

Adrian Batten (c. 1591 – c. 1637) was an English organist and Anglican church composer. He was active during an important period of English church music, between the Reformation and the English Civil War in the 1640s. During this period the liturgical music of the first generations of Anglicans began to diverge significantly from music on the continent. Among the genres developed during this period by Batten and other Anglican composers was the 'verse anthem', in which sections alternate between the full choir and soloists, underlain and unified by an independent organ accompaniment.

== Early life ==
Batten was born in Salisbury, and was a chorister and subsequently an organ scholar at Winchester Cathedral, where he studied under John Holmes. (The date of his birth is uncertain, but since Holmes, Batten's organ instructor, left that post in 1602 when his chorister pupil would have been about twelve years of age, Batten must have been born in about 1590. Most sources give the year as 1591.) Batten remained with the cathedral choir after his voice had changed, as evidenced by graffiti carved into the wall of Bishop Gardiner's chantry that reads "Adrian Battin: 1608".

== Career ==
In 1614, Batten moved to London to become a Vicar Choral of Westminster Abbey, and was apparently still at Westminster in 1625; The Lord Chamberlain's Records for 1625 show that at the funeral of James I (at which Orlando Gibbons was organist and master of the music) Batten is described as a "singingman of Westminster". In 1626, Batten became a Vicar Choral of the cathedral choir at St. Paul's Cathedral, and also played the organ there. As far as is known, he stayed at this position until his death. Letters of administration for the disposal of his estate were granted to John Gilbert of Salisbury (with the consent of Batten's three brothers) on 22 July 1637, so it can be inferred that he died during the middle of that year at the age of approximately 46.

To augment his income while at Westminster Abbey, Batten worked as a music copyist, and the Abbey's account books record payments to Batten for copying works of Weelkes, Tallis and Tomkins. Batten is credited with the preservation of many pieces of church music of the time, compiled in the Batten Organbook (now in the Bodleian Library), a 498-page quarto in his handwriting. Containing many popular works of that time, which Batten scored for the organ, the Batten Organbook is the only surviving source for many pieces of the time.

== Works ==
The Organbook has few of Batten's own works, so ironically much of Batten's own music has been lost. Accordingly, Batten is less well known than some of his contemporaries. He was, however, a prolific composer. A number of works exist only in manuscript at various British libraries and cathedrals, having never been published.

His music has been described as follows: "It is serious and somewhat sad, but not altogether devoid of more joyous touches. His artistic sense was perhaps in excess of his technical powers, and his self-restraint makes of his work something very suitable to certain occasions. His counterpoint is skilful, and the atmosphere created by his music is a pure and devotional one… There is one virtue in Batten's sacred music which was possessed by only a few composers; and that is his constant endeavour to think of music as the servant of divine worship and not as the central figure of that service."
