= Bryan Kelly =

English musician (1934–2026)

- Kelly, in the 1970s
- Born: Bryan George Kelly; 3 January 1934; Oxford, England
- Died: 17 September 2026 (aged 92)
- Education: Royal College of Music
- Occupations: Composer; Conductor; Pianist; Academic teacher
- Organizations: Royal Scottish Academy of Music; Royal College of Music
- Partner: John Newberry

Bryan George Kelly (3 January 1934 – 17 September 2026) was an English composer, conductor and pianist from Oxford who taught at the Royal College of Music and internationally at the American University and in Italy. His compositions, both sacred and secular works, were recorded. In 1965, he composed a pioneering Magnificat in C that included Latin American rhythms. He also composed for learners and ABRSM exams.

== Life and career ==
Bryan George Kelly was born in Oxford on 3 January 1934. He was a choir boy at Worcester College and attended Southfield Grammar School. After lessons with Harold Spicer, the long-serving organist and choirmaster of Manchester College, Oxford, he studied at the Royal College of Music with Gordon Jacob and Herbert Howells, then with Nadia Boulanger in Paris. He subsequently taught at the Royal Scottish Academy of Music and (from 1963) at the Royal College of Music. Kelly then moved to the United States, teaching at the American University in Washington, DC. In Umbria, Italy, he taught and gave recitals in Rome; he also conducted the United Nations Choir. In Egypt, he worked with the Cairo Opera and in projects of the American University in Cairo.

Kelly's partner for 50 years was John Newberry, a watercolour painter.

Kelly died on 17 September 2026, aged 92. An obituary by one of his publishers, Stainer & Bell, summarised that "his genuine compositional "light touch" conveyed joy in everything he wrote".

== Music ==
Kelly composed in a wide range of genres, including light orchestral music, works for brass band, extended orchestral works (such as his Symphony from 1983 and the Concertante Dances), and church music including large-scale choral works. Lighter orchestral works include the Cuban Suite, the New Orleans Suite, Divertissement, and two Leicestershire Schools Symphony Orchestra commissions – the overture Sancho Panza (1969) and the Sinfonia Concertante (1967). His works for brass band include Brass Bagatelles, the overture Provence and the Divertimento for Brass.

His setting of the Magnificat and Nunc dimittis in C (Kelly in C) of 1965 (the first of six settings he composed) is his best-known work. Scored for choir with organ accompaniment (or in an alternative version with timpani, percussion, harp and organ), it controversially incorporated Latin American rhythms. Opinions continue to be divided on the merits of this. The conductor Andrew Nethsingha called it in his liner notes "a beautifully crafted, concise product of its time", but he also notes that Herbert Howells told Kelly: "After each performance, the church will have to be re-consecrated!". Other choral works for the church include the sequence At the round earth's imagin'd corners (1977) for choir, soloists and strings, including six settings of religious texts from the fifteenth to the seventeenth centuries. It was commissioned by the Sheffield Bach Choir. The 45-minute choral work St. Francis of Assisi (1981) is a collaboration with poet John Fuller. For Adoration (2001) is a set of five short anthems.

Instrumental solos and educational music were also important to him. In 1961 Kelly wrote the piano piece Tango for Peter Katin. An example of his educational work is the collection of thirteen easy (Grade 2) themed piano pieces A Baker's Dozen, set by ABRSM. Similarly, the Whodunnit Suite for trumpet and piano includes themed movements entitled: 'Poirot (Detective)', 'Lavinia Lurex (Actress)', 'Colonel Glib (Retired)', 'Miss Slight (Spinster of This Parish)', 'The Chief Suspect' and 'The Chase'.

== Recordings ==
Two CDs of exclusively Kelly's orchestral music were issued by Heritage.

- Volume One (2014): Left Bank Suite, 'Epitaph for Peace' (from the two movement Lest We Forget), A Christmas Celebration (five movements), Concertante Dances, Globe Theatre Suite (for recorder and strings), and Nativity Scenes. Heritage HTG CD284 (2014).
- Volume Two (2021): Fantasy Overture: San Francisco; Calypso's Isle; Concerto da camera; Four Realms Suite, Capricorn, A Christmas Dance (Sir Roger de Coverley), Concerto for Two Trumpets, Comedy Film for orchestra. Heritage HTG CD180 (2020).

Kelly's Improvisations on Christmas Carols (1969) was recorded by the City of Prague Philharmonic Orchestra, conducted by Gavin Sutherland. There is a non-commercial recording of Kelly's Symphony No. 1 (1983), by the City of Oxford Orchestra conducted by Yannis Daras, available on YouTube.

The choir of Clare College, Cambridge issued a CD of choral music by Kelly in 2001, including the cantata Crucifixion, the Missa Brevis and the popular carol "This Lovely Lady". The Chapel Choir of Selwyn College, Cambridge with the Britten Sinfonia, conducted by Sarah MacDonald, recorded a CD of choral works, including Kelly's St Francis of Assisi (1981), At the round earth's imagin'd corners (1977), and For Adoration (2001). The Magnificat and Nunc dimittis in C (1965) was recorded by St John's College Choir Cambridge, conducted by Andrew Nethsingha with organist George Herbert, as the conclusion of a collection of settings of these texts.
