= Paul Edwards (composer) =

English organist & composer (born 1955)

Paul Christison Edwards
- Born: 19 March 1955 (age 71)
- Origin: Bedford Modern School
- Occupations: Composer

Paul Christison Edwards (born 19 March 1955) is an English organist and composer of music for the Anglican Church.

== Biography ==
Paul Edwards was brought up in the village of Turvey in Bedfordshire and educated at St Paul's Choir School and Bedford Modern School. He was a chorister at St Paul's Cathedral for four and a half years and then spent an equal amount of time as lay clerk at Peterborough Cathedral. He has served as organist and choir master at several churches in Bedfordshire, including All Saints, Turvey and St. Paul's Church, Bedford. He is also active as a teacher, piano accompanist and choral singer.

Edwards has made a series of recordings of the historic organs of North Bedfordshire. He has transcribed and edited ten volumes of 18th century English Organ Music published by ANIMUS. The opus numbers of his compositions rise to almost 450. They include about 150 hymn tunes and a large number of anthems. Many of these works have been published in collections including Hymns for Today’s Church, Psalms for Today and Carols for Today. His carol No Small Wonder, written in 1983 to words by Paul Wigmore, first appeared in Carols for Today in 1986 and was recorded on LP by Canterbury Cathedral Choir and subsequently heard in the famous Nine Lessons and Carols service broadcast on the BBC Television by the Choir of King's College, Cambridge in 2000. His music has been recorded on several CDs.

Edwards finds inspiration for his compositions in the English countryside, in particular that of Norfolk. He also enjoys driving and photographing buses and coaches.

== Selected compositions ==
=== Choral works ===
- O dear and lovely brother op.84 (1979)
- Evening Service in C sharp minor op. 133 (1980)
- Mass in C sharp minor op. 133 (1980)
- O gladsome light, O grace op. 126 (1980)
- O dearest Lord, thy sacred head op. 177 (1982)
- Come, dearest Lord op.196 (1983)
- No Small Wonder op. 204 (1983)
- Love is Come Again op. 224 (1985)
- All Poor Men and Humble op. 248 (1988)
- Round me falls the night op.268 (1988)
- Give us the wings of faith (soprano and organ) for the Choir of St Botolph's Parish Church, Helpston
- Great shepherd of thy people op. 292 (1990)
- How shall I sing that majesty op. 325 (1993)
- O love that wilt not let me go (tune Colkirk) (1994)
- O Lord, how manifold are thy works op. 356 (1996)
- Blessed are those servants op. 364 (1996)
- Come, healing cross op. 369 (1997)
- Requiem Mass op. 377 (1999)
- Hold thou my hands op.382 no 1 (2000)
- O joyful light of the heavenly glory op. 382 no 2 (2000)
- Bread of heaven op. 394 (2001)
- What Sweeter Music op. 393 (2001)
- Adam Lay Ybounden op. 343 (2001)
- In Memoriam op. 333 (2001)
- God be in my head op. 412 (2002)
- Behold us, Lord op. 413 (2003)
- Saviour, who didst healing give (2003)
- Carol of the birds op. 436 (2007)

=== Organ works ===
- Three Preludes op. 184 (1983)
- Fanfare for Ascension Day op. 190 (1983)
- An 18th Century Voluntary op. 353 (1995)
- Trumpet Air op. 367 (1997)
- Voluntary for a City Church op. 370 (1997)
- Contemplation op. 378 (1999)
- Partita on Iste Confessor op. 379 (1999-2000)
- Turvey Tuba Tune op. 383 (2000)
- Versets on a Chant by T. H. Webb op. 386 (2000)
- Two Romantic Pieces op. 387 (2000)
- Okehampton Trumpet Tune op. 395 (2001)
- Cornopean Voluntary op. 399 (2001)
- Northamptonshire Miniatures op. 428 (2004–05)
- Trumpet Processional op. 429 (2006)
- Three Elegiac Improvisations op. 432 (2007)
- A Prayer op. 438 (2008)
- St. Godric Variations op. 443 (2009)
- Miniature Variations on a Chant by E. Edwards op. 453 (2011)
- Lament for a Damson Tree op. 454, no. 1 (2012)
- Andante grazioso op. 454, no. 2 (2012)
- Prelude and Tiento "Omnia clara et pulchra" op. 478 (2019)
- Chorale Prelude on "Bow Church" op. 486 (2021)
- Consolation and Concelebration op. 499 (2022)

=== Selected Recordings ===
- No Small Wonder Music for Christmas and Remembrance- The Concord Singers, directed by Mary Bainbridge, LAMM 139D
- God be in my head Choral works by Paul Edwards, The Chapel Choir of Selwyn College, Cambridge directed by Sarah MacDonald (musician), REGCD339
