= John Fuller (poet) =

English poet and author

- Born: 1 January 1937 (age 89) Ashford, Kent, England, UK
- Occupation: Poet and author
- Period: 1970–present
- Genre: Poetry, fiction and children's stories
- Relatives: Roy Fuller (father)

Website
- www.johnfuller-poet.com/index.htm

John Fuller FRSL (born 1 January 1937) is an English poet and author, and Fellow Emeritus at Magdalen College, Oxford.

== Biography ==
Fuller was born at Ashford, Kent, United Kingdom, the son of poet and Oxford Professor Roy Fuller, and educated at St Paul's School and New College, Oxford.

He began teaching in 1962 at the State University of New York, then continued at the University of Manchester. From 1966 to 2002 he was a Fellow and tutor of Magdalen College, Oxford; he is now Fellow Emeritus.

Fuller has published 15 collections of poetry, including Stones and Fires (1996), Now and for a Time (2002), Song and Dance (2008) and the recent The Dice Cup (2014). Chatto and Windus published a Collected Poems in 1996. His novel Flying to Nowhere (1983), a historical fantasy, won the Whitbread First Novel Award, and was nominated for the Booker Prize. In 1996 he won the Forward Prize for Stones and Fires and in 2006 the Michael Braude Award for Light Verse. He has also written collections of short stories and several books for children. His poem Ship of Sounds, illustrated with a wood engraving by the artist Garrick Palmer, was published in 1981 in an edition of 130 by The Gruffyground Press.

In 1968, John Fuller established the Sycamore Press, which he ran from his garage. The Sycamore Press published some of the most influential and critically acclaimed poets of the latter half of the twentieth century, such as W. H. Auden, Philip Larkin and Peter Porter. In addition to these established authors, the Press sought to promote younger poets, many of whom have gone on to achieve great success. The Sycamore Press ceased operations in 1992. John Fuller and the Sycamore Press (Bodleian Library, 2010) includes an interview with John Fuller and personal reflections by Sycamore Press authors about Fuller, the press and the works it produced. The book also includes a bibliography of the pamphlets and broadsides Fuller produced.

Fuller is a Fellow of the Royal Society of Literature.

== Poetry ==
- Fairground Music (Chatto & Windus, 1961)
- The Tree that Walked (Chatto & Windus, 1967; Poetry Book Society Choice)
- Cannibals and Missionaries (Secker & Warburg, 1972)
- Epistles to Several Persons (Secker & Warburg, 1973; Geoffrey Faber Memorial Prize)
- The Mountain and the Sea (Secker & Warburg, 1975)
- Lies and Secrets (Secker & Warburg, 1979)
- The Illusionists (Secker & Warburg, 1980; Southern Arts Literature Prize)
- Waiting for the Music (Salamander Press, 1982)
- The Beautiful Inventions (Secker and Warburg, 1983; Poetry Book Society Choice)
- Selected Poems 1954 to 1982 (Secker & Warburg, 1985, and Penguin Books, 1986)
- Partingtime Hall (with James Fenton, Salamander Press, 1987, and Penguin Books, 1989)
- The Grey Among the Green (Chatto and Windus, 1988)
- The Mechanical Body (Chatto and Windus, 1991)
- Stones and Fires (Random House, 1996)
- Now and for a Time (Chatto and Windus, 2002)
- Collected Poems (Chatto and Windus, 2002)
- Ghosts (Chatto and Windus, 2004)
- The Solitary Life (Clutag Press, 2005)
- The Space of Joy (Chatto and Windus, 2006)
- Song and Dance (Chatto and Windus, 2008)
- Pebble and I (Chatto and Windus, 2010)
- Writing the Picture with David Hurn (Seren Books, 2010)
- New Selected Poems: 1983-2008 (Chatto and Windus, 2012)
- Sketches from the Sierra de Tejeda (Clutag Press, 2013)
- The Dice Cup (Chatto and Windus, 2014)
- Gravel in My Shoe (Chatto and Windus, 2015)
- AWOL with Andrew Wynn Owen (The Emma Press, 2015)
- A Week in Bern (Clutag Press, 2016)
- The Bone Flowers (Chatto and Windus, 2017)
- Double Dactyls (Shoestring Press, 2017)
- Asleep and Awake (Chatto and Windus, 2021)
- How Many Children? (Rack Press Broadside, 2024)
- Marston Meadows (Chatto and Windus, 2025)

== Fiction ==
- Flying to Nowhere (1983), winner of the Costa Book Awards First Novel and nominated for the Booker Prize) (Penguin, 1983)
- The Adventures of Speedfall (Salamander Press, 1985)
- Tell It Me Again (Chatto and Windus, 1988)
- The Burning Boys (Chatto and Windus, 1989)
- Look Twice: An Entertainment (Chatto and Windus, 1991, Vintage, 1992)
- The Worm and the Star (Chatto and Windus, 1993)
- A Skin Diary (Chatto and Windus, 1997)
- The Memoirs of Laetitia Horsepole (Chatto and Windus, 2001)
- Flawed Angel (Chatto and Windus, 2005)
- The Clock in the Forest (Shoestring Press, 2019)
- Loser (Shoestring Press, 2021)

== Criticism ==
- A Reader's Guide to W. H. Auden (Thames and Hudson, 1970)
- The Sonnet (Metheun, 1972)
- W. H. Auden: A Commentary (Faber and Faber, 1998)
- Who is Ozymandias? and other puzzles in poetry (Chatto and Windus, 2011)

== For children ==
- Squeaking Crust (Chatto and Windus, 1974)
- The Last Bid (Andre Deutsch, 1975)
- The Extraordinary Wool Mill and other stories (Andre Deutsch, 1980)
- Come Aboard and Sail Away (Salamander Press, 1983)
- You're Having Me On! (Laurel Books, 2015)
- Up and Down the Chimney (Shoestring Press. 2021)

== As editor ==
- The Dramatic Works of John Gay Two Volumes, (Clarendon Press, 1983)
- The Chatto Book of Love Poetry (Chatto and Windus, 1990)
- W. H. Auden Poems selected by John Fuller (Faber and Faber, 1998)
- The Oxford Book of Sonnets (Oxford University Press, 2000)
- W. H. Auden (Poet to Poet) (Faber and Faber, 2005)
- Alexander Pope (Poet to Poet) (Faber and Faber, 2008)

== As librettist ==
- Herod Do Your Worst by Bryan Kelly 1968
- Spider Monkey Uncle King by Bryan Kelly 1971
- St Francis of Assisi by Bryan Kelly 1981
- Dream Hunter by Nicola LeFanu 2010
