= Mick Imlah =

Scottish poet and editor (1956–2009)

Michael Ogilvie Imlah (26 September 1956 – 12 January 2009), better known as Mick Imlah, was a Scottish poet and editor.

== Background ==
Imlah was brought up in Milngavie near Glasgow, before moving to Beckenham, Kent, in 1966. He was educated at Dulwich College and Magdalen College, Oxford, where he subsequently taught as a Junior Fellow. He captained the Magdalen team in the 1984 series of the quiz show University Challenge, reaching the semi-finals. He helped revive the historic Oxford Poetry before editing Poetry Review from 1983–6, and then worked at the Times Literary Supplement from 1992. His collection The Lost Leader (2008) won the Forward Prize for Best Collection, and was shortlisted for the 2009 International Griffin Poetry Prize.

Imlah died in January 2009, aged 52, as a result of motor neurone disease. He was diagnosed with this disease in December 2007. An issue of Oxford Poetry was dedicated to his memory. Alan Hollinghurst dedicated his 2011 novel The Stranger's Child to Imlah's memory; the final section of the novel has the epigraph 'No one remembers you at all' from Imlah's poem 'In Memoriam Alfred Lord Tennyson'. A selection of Imlah's poetry, edited by Mark Ford and with an introduction by Alan Hollinghurst, was published by Faber and Faber in 2010. A selection of his prose appeared in 2015.

== Bibliography ==
=== As author ===
- The Zoologist’s Bath (Oxford: Sycamore Press, 1982), 15 pages, ISBN 978-0-906003-04-6
- Birthmarks, the first full book of his poetry (Chatto & Windus, 1988), 56 pages, ISBN 978-0-7011-3358-0
- Penguin New Poets 3: Glyn Maxwell, Mick Imlah, Peter Reading (1994), ISBN 978-0-14-058742-5
- Diehard, booklet (Clutag Press, 2006) ISBN 978-0-9547275-9-8
- The Lost Leader, the second full book of his poetry before his death (Faber and Faber, 2008), ISBN 978-0-571-24307-5

=== As editor ===
- Dr. Wortle's School by Anthony Trollope (Imlah wrote the introduction and notes; Penguin Classics, 1999), ISBN 978-0-14-043404-0
- The New Penguin Book of Scottish Verse (with Robert Crawford), 2000), ISBN 978-0-14-058711-1
- A Century of Poems (with Alan Jenkins), Times Supplements Ltd, 2002), 136 pp, ISBN 978-1-84122-064-2
- The TLS On Shakespeare (The Times, 2003), 178 pp, ISBN 978-1-4058-3843-6
- Alfred, Lord Tennyson: Poems Selected by Mick Imlah (Faber and Faber, 2004), ISBN 978-0-571-20700-8
- Edwin Muir Selected Poems (Faber and Faber, 2008), ISBN 978-0-571-23547-6

=== Posthumous ===
- Mick Imlah: Selected Poems Edited by Mark Ford and introduced by Alan Hollinghurst (Faber and Faber, 2010), ISBN 978-0-571-26881-8
- Mick Imlah: Selected Prose Edited by André Naffis-Sahely and Robert Selby (Peter Lang, 2015), ISBN 978-1-906165-53-6
