= Sarah MacDonald (musician) =

Canadian-born organist and conductor

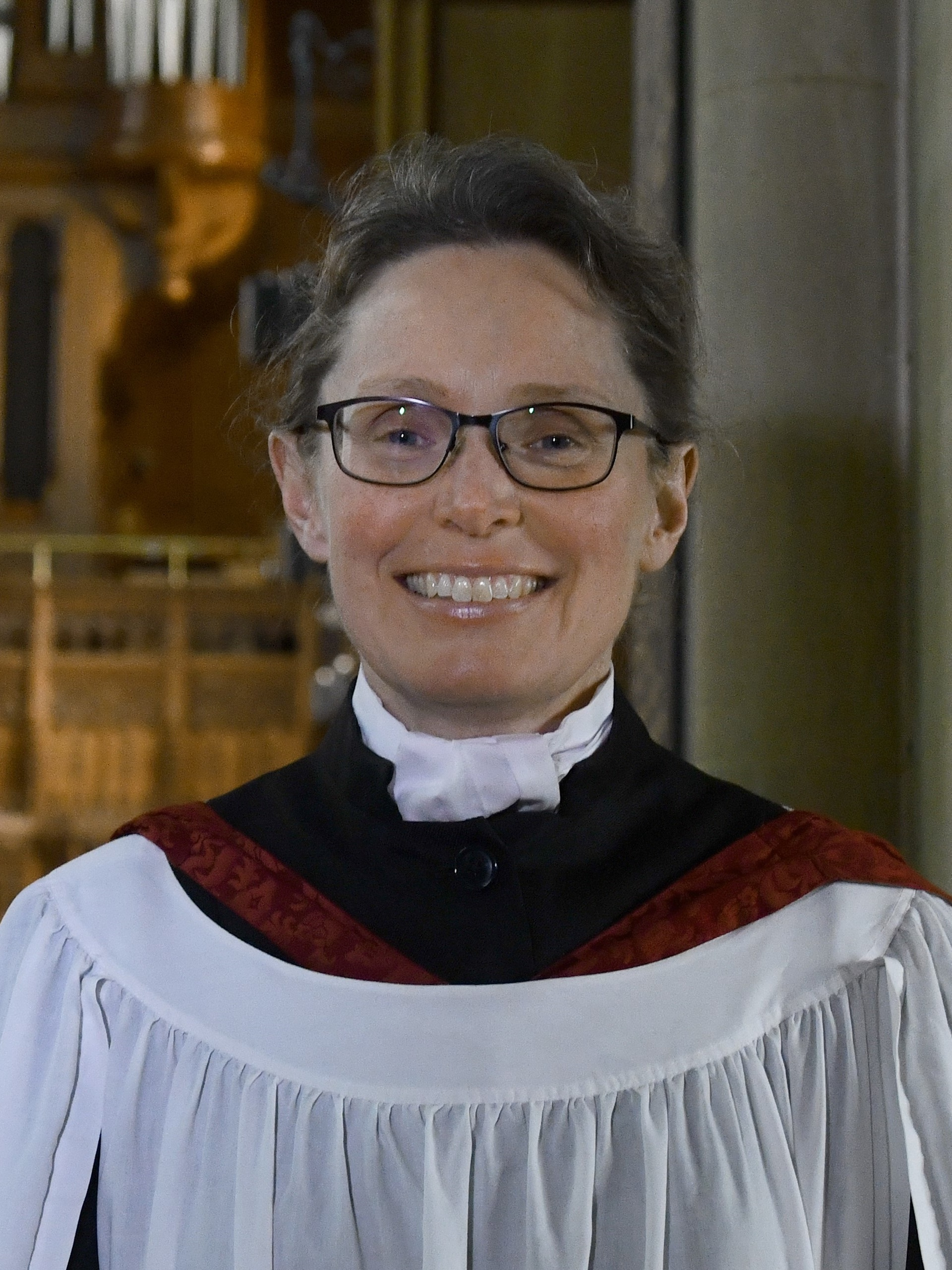
- MacDonald in 2019
- Born: 22 November 1968 (age 57); Ottawa, Canada
- Education: Royal Conservatory of Music; Robinson College, Cambridge
- Occupations: Organist and conductor
- Website: Official website

Sarah Elizabeth Arwen MacDonald (born 22 November 1968) is a Canadian-born organist, conductor, and composer, living in the United Kingdom, and currently holds the positions of Fellow and Director of Music at Selwyn College, Cambridge, and Director of the girl choristers at Ely Cathedral. She is also Organist to the University of Cambridge.She has been at Selwyn since 1999, and is the first woman to hold such a post in an Oxbridge Chapel. In 2018 MacDonald was given the honorary award of Associate of the Royal School of Church Music (ARSCM). She served as the President of the Royal College of Organists from 2024-2025.

== Education ==
MacDonald came from Canada to the United Kingdom in 1992 as organ scholar of Robinson College, Cambridge, after studying piano, organ, and conducting at The Royal Conservatory of Music's Glenn Gould School in Toronto with Leon Fleisher, Marek Jablonski, and John Tuttle. At Cambridge she read for a degree in music, and studied the organ with David Sanger. Her early musical studies as a pianist took place at the Victoria Conservatory of Music on the west coast of British Columbia.

== Career ==
MacDonald has played numerous recitals and conducted choirs throughout the UK, North America, the Middle East, New Zealand, and much of mainland Europe. She has made over 35 recordings as pianist, organist, conductor, and producer, and currently works most frequently with Regent Records. MacDonald is a winner of the Royal College of Organists’ (RCO) Limpus Prize, and is a regular director for the Rodolfus Foundation Choral Courses. She has taught on Oundle for Organists, the Jennifer Bate Organ Academy, and courses run by the RCO. For its first 10 years, she was a director of the Girl Chorister Course at St Thomas' Church Fifth Avenue, in New York City, and is a guest conductor of international RSCM residential courses. MacDonald holds the Royal College of Organists' Fellowship Diploma (FRCO), is Examiner for the RCO and the Cambridge University Music Faculty, and also spent many years as a member of the Academic Board of the RCO and as a Trustee. She is an Honorary Patron of the Herbert Howells Society and of the Society of Women Organists. In 2023 she was appointed University Organist at Cambridge, the first woman to hold this ceremonial role which dates back to 1670.

MacDonald is active as a composer, and has had works published by Encore Publications, the Royal School of Church Music, August Press, and St James Music Press. In January 2020, the 'Sarah MacDonald Choral Series' with Selah Publishing was launched.

MacDonald also writes a popular monthly column for the American Guild of Organists' magazine 'The American Organist', called "UK Report". In November 2022 a compendium of these essays was published in a book "Cathedrals, Chapels, Organs, Choirs". In August 2023, MacDonald co-edited with Timothy Rogers a new anthology of carols which includes her own descants and last verses for nine popular congregational carols.

In July 2023 it was announced that MacDonald has been elected as the next President of the Royal College of Organists. She took up office in July 2024.

== Selected discography ==
- 2026 - Regent Records: Sing my soul his wondrous love, sacred choral music by Sarah MacDonald (Chapel Choir of Selwyn College)
- 2025 - Regent Records: Seven Last Words from the Cross, works by Jonathan Bielby (Chapel Choir of Selwyn College)
- 2025 - Regent Records: St Francis of Assisi and other works, music by Bryan Kelly (Chapel Choir of Selwyn College, Britten Sinfonia)
- 2024 - Regent Records: J S Bach Goldberg Variations, recorded on the Steinway-D in Ely Cathedral (double CD; debut solo album)
- 2022 – Regent Records: Faces in the mist, choral music by Richard Peat (Chapel Choir of Selwyn College, Girl Choristers of Ely Cathedral)
- 2020 – Regent Records: choral music by Paul Ayres (Chapel Choir of Selwyn College, Cambridge)
- 2019 – Regent Records: Christmas Music by Ben Parry (musician) (Chapel Choir of Selwyn College, Cambridge & Ely Cathedral Girls' Choir)
- 2019 – Regent Records: The garment of holiness, Choral Music by Iain Quinn (Chapel Choir of Selwyn College, Cambridge)
- 2018 – Regent Records: An Ely Christmas (Girl Choristers and Layclerks of Ely Cathedral Choir)
- 2018 – Regent Records: Utrumne est ornatum, Choral Music by Mark Gotham (Chapel Choir of Selwyn College, Cambridge & Ely Cathedral Girls' Choir)
- 2017 – Regent Records: Marvellous Light, Choral Music by Ben Ponniah (Chapel Choir of Selwyn College, Cambridge)
- 2017 – Regent Records: Christmas from Selwyn
- 2016 – Regent Records: settings of the Magnificat and Nunc dimittis for upper voices (Ely Cathedral Girls' Choir)
- 2016 – Regent Records: choral music by John Hosking (Chapel Choir of Selwyn College, Cambridge & Ely Cathedral Girls' Choir)
- 2015 – Regent Records: choral music for Advent and Christmas by Alan Bullard, including 'O Come, Emmanuel'
- 2015 – Regent Records: "The Eternal Ecstasy" – including music by MacMillan, Cooke, Tavener, Mealor, Whitacre, Lauridsen, and Bullard
- 2014 – Regent Record: Choral music by Phillip Cooke (Chapel Choir of Selwyn College, Cambridge)
- 2013 – Regent Records: Wondrous Cross: liturgical choral music by Alan Bullard (Chapel Choir of Selwyn College, Cambridge)
- 2013 – Regent Records: Penitence and Redemption: Pergolesi Stabat Mater and other music for Lent and Passiontide (Ely Cathedral Girls' Choir)
- 2011 – Regent Records: Choral Music by Gary Higginson (Chapel Choir of Selwyn College, Cambridge & Ely Cathedral Girls’ Choir)
- 2010 – Regent Records: Milles Regretz: music for lutes and voices (members of the Chapel Choir of Selwyn College, Cambridge)
- 2010 – Regent Records: God be in my head: Choral music by Paul Edwards (composer) (Chapel Choir of Selwyn College, Cambridge)
- 2009 – Regent Records: Come out, Lazar: the Shorter Choral works of Paul Spicer (musician) (Chapel Choir of Selwyn College, Cambridge)
- 2009 – Choir & Organ: A lover’s complaint: New music for choir and organ (Chapel Choir of Selwyn College, Cambridge) (cover CD for March/April 2009 issue of Choir & Organ)
- 2008 – Regent Records: A Candle to the Glorious Sun: Music by Martin Peerson & John Milton Senior (Chapel Choir of Selwyn College, Cambridge)
- 2008 – Regent Records: Sing reign of fair maid: Music for Christmas and the New Year (Ely Cathedral Girls’ Choir)
- 2007 – Priory Records: Master-Pieces from Selwyn College, Cambridge (music selected for Chapel Choir of Selwyn College, Cambridge by Masters of the College)
- 2006 – Kevin Mayhew: Christus vincit: Music by Colin Mawby to celebrate his 70th birthday (Chapel Choir of Selwyn College, Cambridge)
- 2006 – Priory Records: Songs of Welcome: Music for Women’s Voices (Newnham College Chamber Choir, Cambridge)
- 2005 – URM Audio: The Moon of Wintertime: Carols from around the world (Chapel Choir of Selwyn College, Cambridge)
- 2004 – Priory Records: One day in thy courts: Settings of the Psalms (Chapel Choir of Selwyn College, Cambridge)
- 2003 – Priory Records: Complete New English Hymnal Vol. XIV (Chapel Choir of Selwyn College, Cambridge)
- 2000 – Herald AV Productions: Herbert Howells: Evening Canticles (Chapel Choir of Selwyn College, Cambridge)

== Selected publications ==
- 2026 'Quid retribuam Domino' for SATB and organ (Encore Publications)
- 2025 'Brother Sun, Sister Moon' for SATB with divisi (Encore Publications)
- 2024 'Funeral Sentences' for SATB (Encore Publications)
- 2024 'O sacrum convivium' for SATB (Selah Publishing)
- 2023 'Carols of our Time' edited anthology of carols, including nine new descants/last verses to popular congregational carols (Encore Publications)
- 2022 'Love has come' carol for SATB and organ (Encore Publications)
- 2021 'Wondrous Cross' and 'Now the green blade riseth', arrangements for upper voices (Chichester Music Press)
- 2021 'MacDonald in A flat', evening canticles for mixed voices (RSCM)
- 2020 Several works in the 'Sarah MacDonald Choral Series' (Selah Publishing, Pittsburgh)
- 2020 'Tomorrow shall be my dancing day', arrangement for ATB voices (Chichester Music Press)
- 2019 'Gaudete', arrangement for mixed voices (Encore Publications)
- 2019 'Take delight in the Lord', anthem for mixed voices (August Press)
- 2019 'Keep me as the apple of an eye', anthem for upper voices and organ (Encore Publications, forthcoming)
- 2018 'Huron Carol', arrangement for mixed voices (RSCM)
- 2018 'This joyful Eastertide', carol arrangement for ATB voices (Encore Publications)
- 2017 'Advent Responsories', Matin & Vesper Responsories for mixed voices (Encore Publications)
- 2016 'The holly and the ivy', arrangement for upper voices and organ (Encore Publications)
- 2015 'Cherry Tree Carol', arrangement for upper voices and organ (Encore Publications)
- 2014 'Andrew's Song', anthem for upper voices and organ (Encore Publications)
- 2013 'Miserere mei, Deus', anthem for upper voices (Encore Publications)
- 2012 'MacDonald in A flat', evening canticles for upper voices and organ (St James Press, USA)
- 2012 Evening canticles (two sets) for upper voices (RSCM, in volume "Open thou our lips")
- 2009 Preces & Responses for upper voices (Encore Publications)
