= Herbert Brewer =

English composer and organist (1865–1928)

Sir Herbert Brewer
- Brewer in 1898
- Born: Alfred Herbert Brewer; 21 June 1865; Gloucester, England
- Died: 1 March 1928 (aged 62); Gloucester, England
- Occupations: Composer, organist

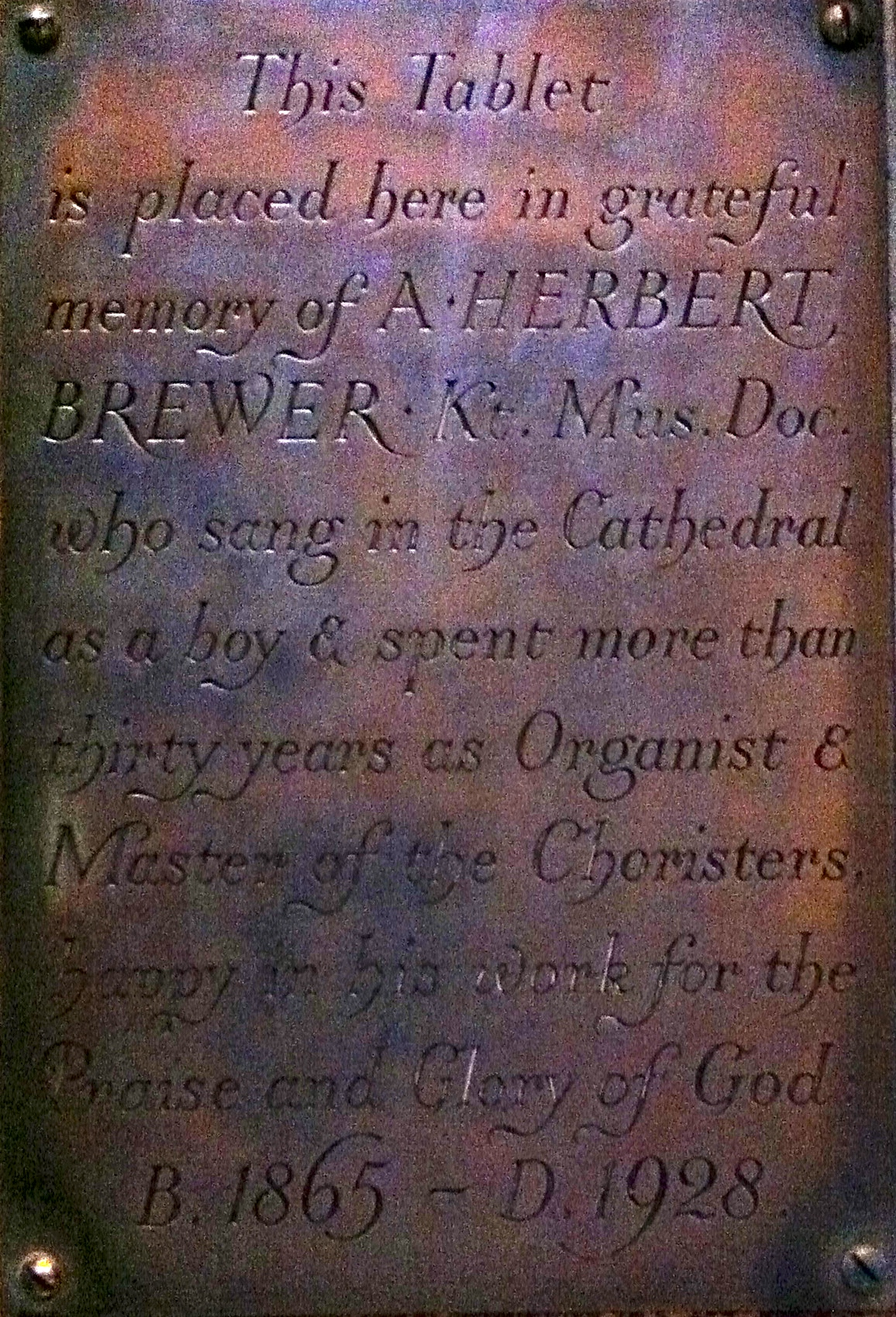
Memorial to Brewer in Gloucester Cathedral

Sir Alfred Herbert Brewer (21 June 1865 – 1 March 1928) was an English composer and organist. As organist of Gloucester Cathedral from 1896 until his death, he contributed a good deal to the Three Choirs Festival for 30 years.

== Life ==
Brewer lived in Gloucester his whole life. He was the organist at two of its churches, and also founded the city's choral society in 1905. He had been a Gloucester Cathedral chorister in his boyhood, and began his organ studies there under C. H. Lloyd. He was educated at the Cathedral School, Oxford and was the first organ scholar at the Royal College of Music. He matriculated at Exeter College, Oxford in 1884.

In December 1896 he succeeded C. Lee Williams (1852–1935) as organist and choirmaster of Gloucester Cathedral. His pupils there included Ivor Novello, Ivor Gurney and Herbert Howells. Although his professional career was spent in the provinces, his three decades of involvement in planning and organising the Three Choirs Festival brought him into contact with a wide range of composers and other artistic figures both from Britain and the continent, including Robert Bridges, Edward Elgar, Glazunov, H Rider Haggard, Hubert Parry, Arthur Quiller-Couch, Ravel, Saint-Saëns and Sibelius. In 1913 Brewer was entrusted with conducting the premiere of Sibelius's tone-poem for soprano and orchestra, Luonnotar, Op. 70. The soloist was Aino Ackté.

Brewer was knighted in 1926. His memoirs, Memories of Choirs and Cloisters, were published posthumously in 1931.

== Music ==
As a composer, Brewer was fairly conservative. His output includes church music of all types, cantatas, songs, instrumental works, and orchestral music. Grove divides the works into those with "serious aspirations", such as the cantatas Emmaus (Gloucester, 1901) and The Holy Innocents (Gloucester, 1904), and lighter pieces including Three Elizabethan Pastorals for voice and orchestra (Hereford, 1906), Summer Sports, a suite for chorus and orchestra (Gloucester, 1910), and the song cycle Jillian of Berry (Hereford, 1921), which "represent him more favourably". 'The Fairy Pipers' was his most popular song, and it was taken up and recorded by Clara Butt between 1917 and 1921.

The greater part of his life was devoted to the advancement of the standards of ecclesiastical music. Some of his church music has been recorded on the Priory label. His Magnificat and Nunc dimittis in D major are in the standard repertoire of Anglican church music. An organ work, Marche Héroïque, is also revived from time to time and was heard at the televised 1979 funeral of Lord Mountbatten.

== Works ==
Organ

- Meditation on the name of BACH
- Solitude
- An impression
- Elegy
- Introduction and Fugato
- Marche héroïque
- Reverie
- A Thanksgiving Processional
- 'Carillon' (Mvmt 3 from A Little Organ Book)
- Interlude in F
- Eventide
- Cloister Garth
- Paean of Praise
- Canzonetta
- Praeludium in Eb
- Elgar organ transcriptions
  - Prelude and "Angel's Farewell", from The Dream of Gerontius, Op. 38
  - In the South, Op. 50
  - Chanson de Matin, Op. 15/1
  - Chanson de Nuit, Op. 15/2

Choral

- Emmaus, cantata (1901)
- The Holy Innocents, cantata (1904)
- Summer Sports, suite for chorus and orchestra (1910)
- Brothers in Arms a marching song, words by H. Godwin Chance (1914)
- Bow down Thine ear, O Lord (1916)
- I heard the bells (1916)
- God is our hope and strength (1917)
- Let the people praise thee (1921)
- Fear Not, O Land
- Gloucester tune written for Charles Wesley's hymn 'Come, let us with our Lord arise' (New English Hymnal 254)
- Magnificat and Nunc dimittis in A (1893)
- Magnificat and Nunc dimittis in B flat (1894)
- Magnificat and Nunc dimittis in F (circa 1900)
- Magnificat and Nunc dimittis in E flat (1904)
- Magnificat and Nunc dimittis in D (1927)

Song

- Three Elizabethan Pastorals for voice and orchestra (1906)
- The Fairy Pipers (1912), text Frederic Weatherly
- Jillian of Berry, song cycle (1921)
- Miller’s Green, song cycle (1921)
- A Sprig of Shamrock: Four Old Irish Airs, song cycle (1925), text F W Harvey

Preceded by Charles Lee Williams	Organist and Master of the Choristers of Gloucester Cathedral; 1897-1928	Succeeded by Herbert Sumsion
