= Alan Ridout =

British composer

- Born: 9 December 1934; West Wickham, Kent, England
- Died: 19 March 1996 (aged 61); Caen, France
- Occupation: Composer

Alan Ridout (9 December 1934 – 19 March 1996) was a British composer and teacher.

== Life ==
Born in West Wickham, Kent, (Note: West Wickham was originally in Kent in 1934 when Ridout was born, but was incorporated into Greater London in 1965) England, Alan Ridout studied briefly at the Guildhall School of Music before commencing four years of study at the Royal College of Music, London with Herbert Howells and Gordon Jacob. He was later taught by Michael Tippett, Peter Fricker and (under a Dutch government scholarship) Henk Badings.

He went on to teach at the Royal College of Music, the University of Birmingham, the University of Cambridge, the University of London, and at The King's School, Canterbury. He also broadcast musical talks on the radio.

Alan Ridout lived for much of his life in Canterbury, but after a serious heart attack in 1990 he moved to France, settling in the town of Vitré, Brittany, before moving on to Caen at the very end of his life.

== Music ==
Ridout's style is mostly tonal, though in younger life he wrote some microtonal works. His works include church, orchestral and chamber music, often intended for amateurs and children. Much of the church music came out of a collaboration between Ridout and Allan Wicks, organist and master of the choristers at Canterbury Cathedral which began in 1964.

The six string quartets, composed over a period of nine years (1985-1994), are adventurous and varied in form and mood, but "not so testing as to be outside the scope of the good amateur ensemble". There are also a large number of concertinos for solo instruments with piano or string accompaniment often written especially for students or friends. He also wrote pieces for unaccompanied instruments such as Caliban and Ariel (1974), for unaccompanied bassoon, a musical recreation of two Shakespeare characters from The Tempest. It was first performed in Canterbury by Laurence Perkins (then a student) and has been frequently performed (and recorded) by him since.

Alan Ridout worked regularly with the Leicestershire Schools Symphony Orchestra (LSSO). His Three Pictures of Picasso, originally written for the National Youth Orchestra, was performed by the LSSO at a De Montfort Hall concert conducted by Rudolf Schwarz in 1964 with the composer present. His second symphony, also for the LSSO, was dedicated to Michael Tippett to mark his 60th birthday (though Ridout did not hold Tippett in high regard). The symphony was first performed in 1965 and also featured in the television programme Overture with Beginners (see video link below).

The 1967 Leicestershire Schools Music Festival included a number of LSSO commissions and in May that year Ridout's dance drama Funeral Games for a Greek Warrior made its debut at De Montfort Hall. In July 1967 the LSSO made its first commercial disc for the Pye Golden Guinea label and Ridout responded to a request for a short work for inclusion on the disc by composing a lively Concertante Music. The work's debut took place on a record rather than at a public concert. Concertante Music was then taken on the LSSO tour of Denmark and Germany in September 1967 (see external video link below).

Recent academic studies of Ridout's music include Andrew Plant's monograph The Higher Storie: Alan Ridout's music for counter-tenor (2022) and Nicholas Bannan's Signs of the times: the Canterbury children’s operas of Alan Ridout (2022).

Ridout's musical archive was bequethed by him to Ampleforth Abbey in Yorkshire whose library now holds a comprehensive catalogue of his manuscripts. A few of previously unpublished works held by the library have in recent years been made available for publication by the Trustees of Ampleforth Abbey bringing his work to a new audience.

== Selected works ==
Ridout was a prolific composer; the complete list of his works runs to 100 pages.

Choral

- On Christ's Nativity for choir SATB (1954)
- St. John Passion for tenor, bass, chorus and organ (1962)
- Magnificat and Nunc Dimittis (St. John's service) for choir SATB and organ (1962)
- O most merciful Redeemer for choir SATB (1965)
- Sacred Songs for Treble Voices (1st set) for boys' choir and organ (1965)
- The Beatitudes for 4-part treble voices (1966)
- Let us with a gladsome mind for mixed choir and organ (1967)
- Stabat Mater, for the Louis Halsey Singers (1967)
- Communion Service for choir and congregation (1968)
- Sacred Songs for Treble Voices (3rd set) for boys' choir and organ (1969)
- The History of the Flood to 6 voices and to a poem by John Heath-Stubbs (1971)
- Songs of Advent for unison voices and organ (1987)
- Through the Day for 2-part treble voices and organ (1989)
- Samuel! Cantata for treble, baritone and bass soli, mixed choir and organ (1993)
- Canticle of Joy for countertenor and tenor solo, mixed choir and orchestra (1994)

Vocal

- Whom time will not reprieve, four songs for countertenor and viola (1989)

Orchestral

For a ?complete list of his orchestral works, see

- Symphony No. 1 (1958)
- Concerto for Orchestra (1959)
- Three Pictures of Picasso (1962)
- Symphony No. 2 (1964)
- Symphony No. 3 (for wind, brass and percussion) (1965)
- Funeral Games for a Greek Warrior for orchestra and children's choir (1966)
- Concertante Music (1967)
- Symphony No. 4 (for wind, brass and percussion) (1967)
- Symphony No.5 Sinfonia da chiesa for women's voices and orchestra (1969)
- Concerto for double bass and strings (1974)
- Concertino for bassoon and strings (1975)
- Concertino for trumpet and strings (1976)
- Concertino for clarinet and strings (1976)
- Concertino For flute and strings (1978)
- Concertino for tuba and strings (1979)
- Concertino for Alto Saxophone and Strings (1979)
- Concerto for treble recorder, strings and percussion (1979)
- Symphony No 6 for wind orchestra (1981)
- Aubade for violin and orchestra (1982)
- Pedro the Parrot, for National Youth Ballet (1983)
- Symphony No.7 for trumpets, percussion, piano and strings (1983)
- Cello Concerto No. 1 for cello, strings and percussion (1984)
- Symphony No.8 for string orchestra (1984)
- Ode (1986)
- Cello Concerto No. 2 for cello and voices (1994)
- Cello Concerto No. 3 The Prisoner for solo cello and 8 cellos (1995)

Organ

- The Seven Last Words (1965)
- Two Pictures of Graham Sutherland (1967)
- Resurrection Dances (1969)
- Three Nativity Dances (1971)
- Processions (1974)
- Six Studies (1976)
- The Fourteen Stations of the Cross (1978)
- Canticle of the Rose (1989)
- Toccata (1989)
- Messe d'orgue (1995)

Brass

- Sonata for solo trombone (1975)
- Eclogue for trombone and piano (1975)
- Autumn Story for tuba and piano (1978)
- Six Diversions for horn and piano (1989)
- Light and Shade: six easy pieces for horn and piano (1991)

Winds

- Sonata for flute and piano (or harp) (1987; date of first publication 2022)
- Sonatina for clarinet and piano (1967)
- Pigs for four bassoons (1972)
- Sonata for bassoon and piano (1972)
- Concertante for woodwind quartet (1972)
- Three nocturnes for flute and piano (1972)
- Caliban and Ariel for solo bassoon (1974)
- Suite for oboe and piano (1974)
- The Emperor and the Bird of Paradise for narrator and solo flute (1974)
- 6 Melodies for flute or oboe and piano (1976)
- Epitaph for Michael for clarinet (1976)
- Tarka, the water wanderer for three flutes (1987)
- A Day in the Country: 12 easy pieces for recorder and piano (1990)
- The Shippen for wind quintet (1990)
- The Shepherd's Calendar for 4 bassoons (1991)
- Farndale Dances for solo piccolo (1992)
- Snow Scenes for saxophone in E♭ and piano (1992)
- To Autumn for flute and piano (1992)
- Folies de Paris for contrabassoon and piano (1994)

Strings

- Partita for cello solo (1959)
- Bagatelles for cello and piano (1967)
- Music for Three Violoncelli (1967)
- Ferdinand for speaker and solo violin (1971)
- Little Sad Sound, a melodrama for narrator and double bass (1974)
- String Quartet No. 1 (1985)
- String Quartet No. 2 (1987)
- String Quartet No. 3 (1987)
- Seascapes: six easy pieces for viola or cello and piano (1990)
- Dance Preludes for double bass or cello and piano (1992)
- String Quartet No. 4 Malden (1992)
- String Quartet No. 5 Stocklinch (1993)
- String Quartet No. 6 The Vitréen (1994)

Piano

- Dance Bagatelles (1956)
- Suite for clavichord or piano (1960)
- Sonatina (1968)
- Portraits: Eight pieces for piano (1973)
- White Notes, Black Notes, Key Notes (1990)

Percussion

- Sonatina for timpani (1967)

== Video ==
- Sir Michael Tippett and Eric Pinkett rehearse Ridout's 2nd Symphony with the Leicestershire Schools Symphony Orchestra in 1965 on YouTube
- A complete performance of Concertante Music on YouTube
