= Herbert Sumsion =

English organist and composer (1899-1995)

Herbert Whitton Sumsion CBE
- Born: 14 January 1899; Gloucester, England
- Died: 11 August 1995 (aged 96)
- Genres: Classical
- Occupation: Composer
- Instrument: Organ

Herbert Whitton Sumsion CBE (14 January 1899 – 11 August 1995) was an English musician who was organist of Gloucester Cathedral from 1928 to 1967. Through his leadership role with the Three Choirs Festival, Sumsion maintained close associations with major figures in England's 20th-century musical renaissance, including Edward Elgar, Herbert Howells, Gerald Finzi, and Ralph Vaughan Williams. Although Sumsion is known primarily as a cathedral musician, his professional career spanned more than 60 years and encompassed composing, conducting, performing, accompanying, and teaching. His compositions include works for choir and organ, as well as lesser-known chamber and orchestral works.

== Biography ==
=== Training and early career ===
Sumsion was born in Gloucester, a cathedral city on the River Severn. In 1908, at the age of nine, he became a Probationer in the choir at the cathedral there, which was then under the direction of Herbert Brewer. After two years, Sumsion became a full Chorister and sang with the choir until 1914. From 1911 to 1915 he was organist at Ashleworth, a small village six miles from Gloucester, responsible for the church choir and the "organ blower" for a fee of £5 a quarter, quite a responsibility for a 12-year-old. Gloucester was (and is) one of the three host cities, along with Worcester and Hereford, of the Three Choirs Festival, an annual festival of choral emphasis first held in the early 18th century. Sumsion would later write of his musically formative experiences at the cathedral: 'Quite soon after my entry into the choir I was singing with the [Three Choirs] Festival Chorus and gradually absorbing the choral music of the great classical composers and the contemporary writers, of whom the giant was certainly Elgar.' When Sumsion's treble voice broke at age 15, he became an 'articled pupil' (Note: For a fuller description of the 'articled pupil' system in English cathedrals at this time, see Spicer 1998, p. 19) to Brewer, a designation connoting a three-year apprenticeship in organ, choral direction, and music theory. As one of Brewer's articled pupils Sumsion was following in the footsteps of his slightly older contemporaries, Herbert Howells and Ivor Gurney. Sumsion passed the Associateship exam of the Royal College of Organists in 1915, and in July 1916 joined Howells in passing the Fellowship exam; though he was only 17, Sumsion was awarded the Turpin prize for the second-highest marks in the practical component.

From 1917 to 1919 Sumsion served in 16th (County of London) Battalion, London Regiment (Queen's Westminster Rifles) and spent time in the trenches of the Western Front. In 1919 he returned to Gloucester Cathedral to take up an appointment as assistant organist to Brewer. Sumsion's duties during this period included serving as accompanist for the Three Choirs Festival Chorus, which occasioned a brief but memorable encounter with Elgar after a rehearsal of The Dream of Gerontius. Sumsion earned an undergraduate degree in music from Durham University in 1920 and continued in his post at Gloucester until 1922, when he embarked for London to become organist of Christ Church, Lancaster Gate. In 1924 he took on two additional posts—director of music at Bishop's Stortford College, north of London, and a teaching position at Morley College. He also studied conducting with Adrian Boult at the Royal College of Music, though Boult observed that Sumsion's conducting technique was already well-developed.

At the Royal College of Music Sumsion also met R. O. Morris, professor of counterpoint and composition. When Morris accepted a position at the Curtis Institute of Music in Philadelphia, he asked Sumsion to serve as his assistant; the two, along with Morris's wife Emmie, departed for America at the end of September 1926. The Curtis Institute was then a conservatory in its infancy, but figures such as Leopold Stokowski, famed conductor of the Philadelphia Orchestra, were associated with it in its early days. (Note: Although no direct contact between Sumsion and Stokowski has been confirmed, Boden 1995 notes that Sumsion 'added considerably to his conducting experience' during his time at Curtis) Sumsion's decision to accompany the Morrises was of consequence to his personal life as well as his career. Emmie Morris wrote frequently to her sister Adeline (who was married to Ralph Vaughan Williams) and reported 'with interest' on Sumsion's courtship of an American girl, Alice Garlichs. Sumsion had been introduced to Alice through her uncle, a professor at the University of Pennsylvania whom Sumsion had met on board the ship to America. On 7 June 1927, Herbert and Alice were married in Philadelphia.

=== Gloucester and the Three Choirs Festival ===
On 1 March 1928, Herbert Brewer died suddenly of a heart attack, leaving the post of organist at Gloucester vacant only a few months before the cathedral was to host the Three Choirs Festival. Brewer had expressed a desire that Sumsion succeed him, so although Sumsion had just accepted the position of organist at Coventry cathedral, the Dean and Chapter at Gloucester negotiated his release from this commitment. Sumsion and his wife left America for England in June 1928.

Despite his relatively late arrival on the scene, Sumsion's leadership of the 1928 Three Choirs Festival at Gloucester impressed both music colleagues and the press. In those days the resident organist bore the burden of conducting, and though in 1928 several composers were on hand to conduct their own works—notably Elgar and the Hungarian composer Zoltán Kodály—Sumsion was responsible for works such as Verdi's Requiem and Honegger's King David, the latter being a Three Choirs debut. It was following the 1928 festival that Elgar made his oft-quoted pun: 'What at the beginning of the week was assumption has now become a certainty.'

A former Sumsion pupil writes that Sumsion's 'vision in matters of programme planning together with his skill of direction in a very wide spectrum of works made him one of the most successful conductors' in the Three Choirs Festival's history. From 1928 until his retirement in 1967, Sumsion was responsible for planning and serving as the principal conductor for eleven festivals held at Gloucester. Although Sumsion personally acknowledged the challenge that cathedral organists—who were primarily choral conductors—faced in conducting major orchestral works, his own conducting was greatly respected, and his interpretations of Elgar's works were viewed as being representative of the composer's own readings. At the first festival following Elgar's death (1934), Sumsion proposed that the three cathedral organists each conduct one of the Elgar works on the program, a welcome division of labour for the host conductor that would later become standard practice. After the retirement in 1949 of Percy Hull of Hereford and Ivor Atkins of Worcester, Sumsion remained the only direct link with Elgar amongst the musicians of the three cathedrals.

In his programme planning for the festival, Sumsion championed the performance of new English works. Notable premieres at Sumsion's Gloucester festivals included Gustav Holst's Choral Fantasia (1931), Howells's Hymnus Paradisi (1950), and Finzi's Intimations of Immortality (1950); as well as works by Vaughan Williams, Howard Ferguson, Robin Milford, Tony Hewitt-Jones, John Sanders, and Sumsion himself. Outside the realm of English music, Sumsion helped sustain a festival connection with Kodály by inviting him back to Gloucester in 1937 and programming his works at six Gloucester festivals.

Sumsion maintained personal friendships with many of the well-known composers who frequented the festival, particularly Vaughan Williams, Finzi, and Howells. Social gatherings at the festival, in which Sumsion's wife Alice played a significant role, helped to cultivate these relationships. In 2007 Ursula Vaughan Williams still recalled that her husband had been 'great friends' with Herbert and Alice. (Note: Sumsion was called 'John' by his friends) Sumsion was considered part of Finzi's intimate circle and was a frequent guest at Finzi's home at Ashmansworth in Hampshire; the Sumsion and Finzi families (the Sumsions had three sons, the Finzis two) also went on holiday together. The Sumsion and Howells families were likewise close, evidenced by the fact that in 1935 the Sumsions hosted Howells and his wife for Christmas following the death of the Howellses' son Michael; and according to one Howells biographer, it was Sumsion who first encouraged Howells to allow Hymnus Paradisi, written in Michael's memory, to be performed. (Note: Spicer 1998, p. 145 contends that Howells first showed Hymnus Paradis to Sumsion, who in turn showed it to Finzi, and that only after these two expressed their enthusiasm did Howells show the music to Vaughan Williams. Boden 1992, p. 193 also notes that it was Sumsion who suggested the title of the work to Howells.)

Sumsion also led an active professional life outside the cathedral. He had begun composing as a young man and continued to accept commissions when he was well into his eighties. Possibly his last work was a set of hymns entitled 'Four Hymns', to words by Paul Wigmore, and published by Oecumuse in the autumn of 1995, only weeks after Sumsion's death. He composed many works for organ and choir, as well as chamber and orchestral pieces and a book of piano exercises. Sumsion also taught piano, organ, and composition privately, adjudicated at competitions, accompanied vocalists and played with chamber groups, and performed as an organ recitalist. His 1965 recording of Elgar's Organ Sonata, which he recorded in one 'take', is now regarded as the standard interpretation of that work. Concurrent with his post at the cathedral Sumsion served as director of music at Cheltenham Ladies' College (1935–1968) and directed the Gloucester Choral and Orchestral Societies. As a teacher and choir trainer he was said to be demanding yet kind and encouraging, displaying 'that rare gift that made people want to do well for him'. Sumsion was honoured with a Lambeth Doctorate in 1947 and was appointed CBE in 1961.

After retiring from Gloucester cathedral in 1967, Sumsion remained in Gloucestershire and continued to teach and compose. He helped design the fabulous Hill, Norman & Beard Chapel Organ for Ellesmere College after a fire there had totally destroyed the Chapel in 1966. He died at Frampton-on-Severn in 1995 at age 96.

== Works ==
Sumsion's compositional style reflects the influence of his more famous contemporaries Howells, Finzi, and Vaughan Williams, while at the same time retaining something of the 'diatonic strength' of Edwardian composers like Parry and Brewer. Despite these influences, however, Sumsion's music speaks in a fresh and distinctive voice that is appealing to both performers and listeners. His harmonic language is sturdy and conventional, yet often tinged with modality, and his melodic style is fluid and elegant. In the organ and choral works Sumsion displays a fondness for parallel thirds in the accompaniment, detached bass lines, and the descending minor third in the melody.

Choral and organ music appear most often in Sumsion's output during his Gloucester tenure and retirement, with many choral pieces dating from his last decade of life. Works such as the Magnificat and Nunc dimittis in G major, the Preces and Responses, and the anthem They that go down to the sea in ships have entered the standard repertoire of Anglican church music. A new disc of Sumsion's choral music featuring the Ecclesium Choir, directed by Philip Stopford, was released in 2007 as No. 9 in Priory's British Church Composers Series. Sumsion's most significant work for organ is the challenging Introduction and Theme, which has been recorded by Donald Hunt (among others) for the Helios label.

Most of Sumsion's chamber and orchestral works were written earlier in his career and are unpublished or out of print; however a Piano Trio, the orchestral pieces Overture, In the Cotswolds and Idyll, At Valley Green, and the Cello Sonata have all had public performances, the first three at various Three Choirs Festivals. David Lloyd-Jones and the Royal Ballet Sinfonia have recorded an attractive work for strings called A Mountain Tune ('English String Miniatures'/White Line/2003), which Sumsion originally wrote for cello and piano.

In December 2014, the violinist Rupert Marshall-Luck and the pianist Duncan Honeybourne recorded for EM Records Sumsion's Violin Sonata of 1920; the recording was released in May 2015 (King of Instruments; Instrument of Kings/EM Records/EMR CD029). The work, which was suspected to have been lost, was rediscovered in the archive of Sumsion's works following correspondence between Marshall-Luck, Dr Donald Hunt and the composer's grandson, Paul Sumsion.

=== Choral ===
- As With Gladness, for SATB choir and organ
- Benedicite, Omnia Opera in B-flat major, for SATB choir and organ
- By the Cross of Jesus, for SATB choir
- A Child This Day is Born, for SATB choir and organ
- Communion Service in A and D for SSATB and organ
- Communion Service in F major, for SATB choir and organ
- Fear Not O Land, for SATB choir and organ
- Festival Benedicite in D major, for SATB choir and organ or orchestra
- The Holy Birth, for SATB choir and organ
- Hosanna to the Son of David, for SATB choir
- I Was Glad, for TTBB and piano
- I Will Lift Up Mine Eyes, for SATB choir and organ
- In Exile, motet for double chorus unaccompanied
- The Lord Ascendeth Up on High, for SATB choir and organ
- Magnificat and Nunc Dimittis in A major, for SATB choir and organ
- Magnificat and Nunc Dimittis in D major, for trebles or SATB choir and organ
- Magnificat and Nunc Dimittis in G major, for SATB choir and organ
- Magnificat and Nunc Dimittis in G Major, for ATB choir and organ
- Magnificat and Nunc Dimittis in G Major, for treble choir and organ
- Nine Introits for Seasons of the Church's Year
  - And the Angel said, Behold (Christmas)
  - Arise, Shine for your light has come (Epiphany)
  - Timor et Tremor
  - With a Voice of Singing
  - You shall receive power
  - Holy, holy, holy is the Lord God
  - Lift up your heads
  - O praise the Lord, ye Angels of his
  - Dilexit Justitiam
- O Be Joyful in the Lord, for SATB choir and organ
- O Lord, Thou Hast Searched Me Out, for SATB choir and organ
- One Thing Have I Desired of the Lord, for SATB double choir
- Praise the Lord, O My Soul, for SATB choir
- Praise to the Lord (St. Patrick’s Breastplate), for SATB choir
- The Spacious Firmament, for SATB choir and organ
- Te Deum Laudamus in G major, for SATB choir and organ
- There is a Green Hill Far Away, for SATB choir and organ
- They That Go Down to the Sea in Ships, for SATB choir and organ
- Thou Wilt Keep Him in Perfect Peace, for SATB choir and organ
- Two Carols (I Sing of a Maiden and Herrick’s Carol), for unaccompanied mixed voices
- Versicles, Responses, and the Lord's Prayer, for SATB choir
- Watt’s Cradle Song, for unison choir
- We Love the Place, O God, for SATB choir

=== Organ ===
- Air, Berceuse and Procession
- Allegretto
- Canzona
- Carol and Musette (Vaughan Williams) arranged for organ
- Ceremonial March
- Chorale Prelude on 'Down Ampney'
- Cradle Song
- Elegy
- Four Preludes on Well-Known Carols
- Intermezzo
- Introduction and Theme
- Pastorale
- Procession
- Quiet Postlude
- Sarabande and Interlude
- Toccata on 'University'
- Variations on a Folk Tune

=== Chamber and orchestral ===
- Idyll, At Valley Green for orchestra
- Lerryn, for orchestra
- A Mountain Tune, for cello and piano
- A Mountain Tune, arr. for string orchestra
- Overture, In the Cotswolds, for full orchestra
- Piano Trio (1931)
- Piano Trio (1982)
- Romance, for string orchestra
- Sonata in C minor, for cello and piano
- Sonata in E minor, for violin and piano
- String Quartet in G major
- Variations on a Folk Song, 'I Will Give My Love an Apple', for piano solo
- Variations on a Folk Tune, for flute and piano

=== Miscellaneous ===
- Piano Technique: a Book of Exercises

Preceded by Herbert Brewer	Organist and Master of the Choristers of Gloucester Cathedral; 1928–1967	Succeeded by John Sanders
