= Choir of Trinity College, Cambridge =

- Choir
- Founded: 1553
- Founder: Mary Tudor
- Members: c. 34 choral scholars; 2 organ scholars
- Music director: Steven Grahl
- Website: http://trinitycollegechoir.com/

The Choir of Trinity College, Cambridge is a mixed choir whose primary function is to sing choral services in the Tudor chapel of Trinity College, Cambridge. In January 2011, Gramophone named the choir the fifth best choir in the world.

The choir has taken various forms since its foundation, and has existed in its present form since 1982 when, shortly after the admission of women to the college, female voices were used for the first time for the choir's top lines. Three regular services are sung per week in full University Term, and the choir sings Latin grace from the minstrels' gallery in the college's Great Hall at a number of feasts.

In addition, the choir undertakes projects outside term-time such as recordings, concerts, radio broadcasts and tours.

The choir is typically made up of 36 members, many of whom are students in Trinity College.

== Directors of Music ==
The director of music is Steven Grahl, who succeeded Stephen Layton in January 2024.

== History of the Choir ==
External audio
- You may hear the Choir of Trinity College Cambridge performing Gregorio Allegri's Miserere mei, Deus (Vulgate Psalm 50) Here on archive.org

Trinity College's choral associations date back to the establishment of King's Hall by Edward II in 1317 (Chaucer's "Solar Hall" in The Canterbury Tales). This college, incorporated by Edward III in 1337, was amalgamated with an adjacent early 14th century foundation, Michaelhouse, when Henry VIII created Trinity in 1546. From the time of Edward II, Chapel Royal choristers, on leaving the Court, customarily entered King's Hall to continue their academic studies, alongside other undergraduates training for service in the royal administration.

The constitution of the medieval chapel choir remains obscure, but the choral foundation which Mary Tudor established in 1553 (ten choristers, six lay clerks, four priests, an organist, and a schoolmaster) survived essentially unchanged for over 300 years. Among the musicians associated with the choir during this time were the Tudor composers Thomas Preston, Robert White and John Hilton the elder; Robert Ramsey was organist just before the English Commonwealth; the lutenist and writer Thomas Mace was a lay clerk for around 70 years from 1635; and Thomas Attwood Walmisley was organist in the early 19th century.

In the 1896/97 academic year the college choir school was closed down and incorporated into The Perse Grammar School. Thereafter, the choir of boy trebles, lay clerks (some of whom shared their duties with the choirs of King's and St John's Colleges) and students continued the regular pattern of choral services until the 1950s. This traditionally-constituted body then gave way to a choir of undergraduate men during Raymond Leppard's tenure as Director of Music, to be replaced with a mixed choir by Richard Marlow in 1982.

== Tours and Concerts ==
The choir has toured to destinations such as Australia, Germany, France, Spain, Italy, the United States, Canada, the Canary Islands, India, South Africa, Namibia and Zimbabwe, Peru, and Japan, Taiwan and Hong Kong. Particularly notable events include singing mass at the installation of Abbot Martin Werlen, O.S.B. as Abbot of Einsiedeln, Switzerland, and becoming the first western choir to tour India.

The choir also performs concerts in the UK, at home in Cambridge and in London (South Bank Centre, St John's Smith Square, Spitalfields Festival), and around the country. ‘Livings tours’ allow the choir to visit parishes around the country of which the college is patron and sing services and concerts; these include villages in the Isle of Wight, North Yorkshire, County Durham, Norfolk and the Lake District.

== May Week ==
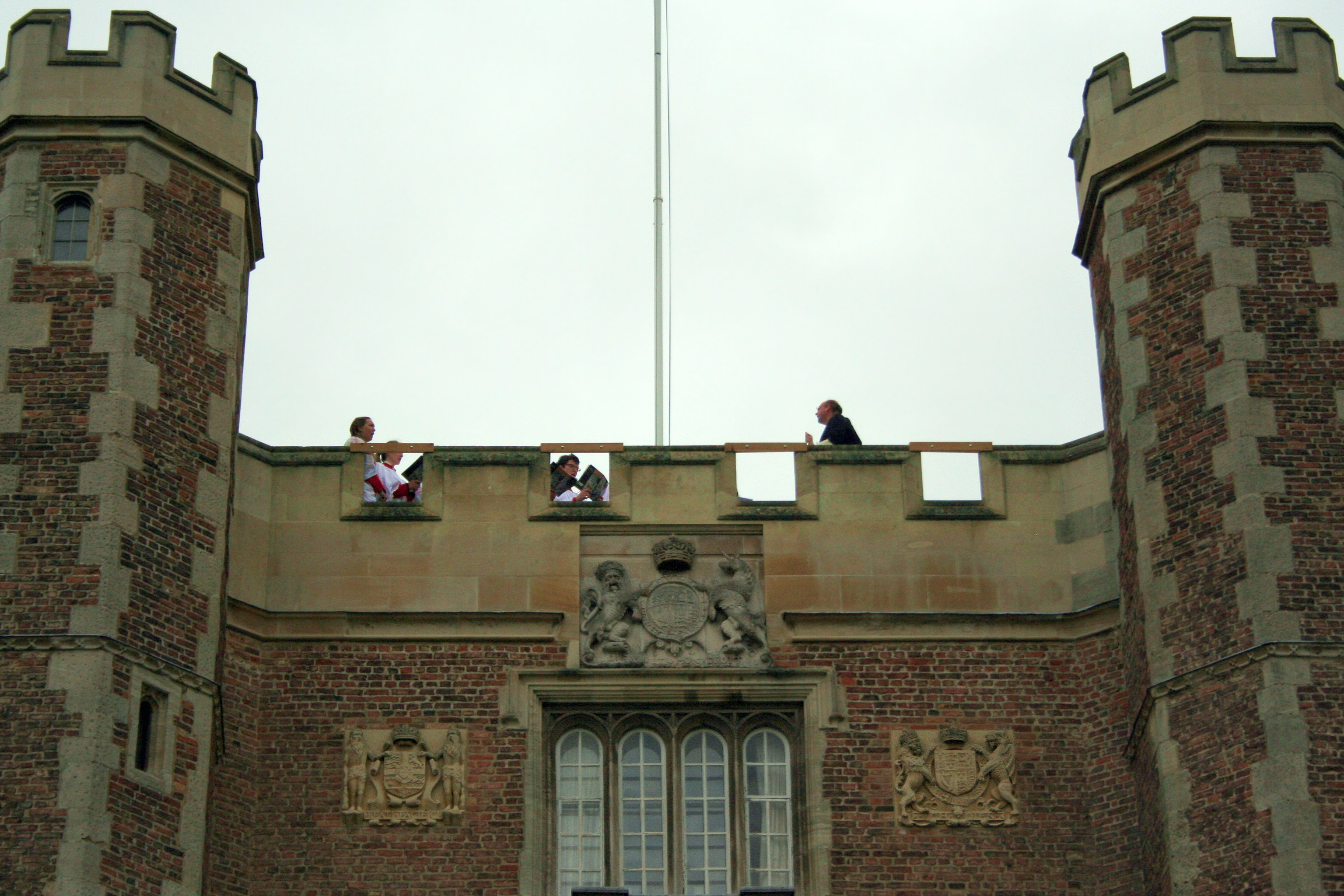
Singing from the Towers, 2013

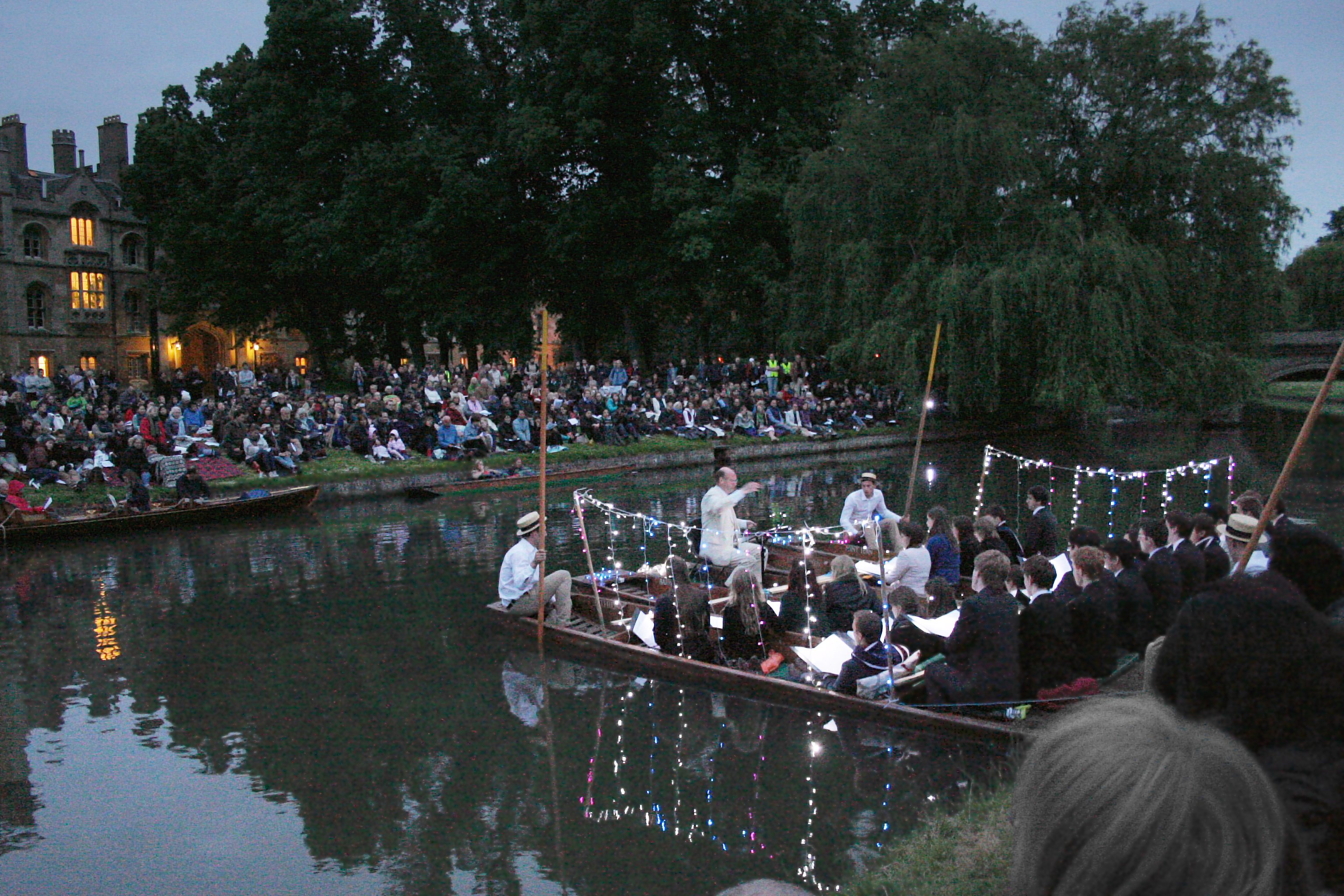
Singing on the River, 2013

On the final Sunday of the academic year the Choir performs two outdoor concerts. At midday the choir sings antiphonally from two of the towers in the college's Great Court, with a brass ensemble performing from the third. In the evening the choir inaugurates May Week with the traditional River Concert, in which the madrigals and part-songs are performed upon punts moored at Trinity Backs. The evening's entertainment concludes, as dusk gives way to darkness, with Wilbye's madrigal Draw on, sweet night performed as the choir is punted down the river and out of sight.

== Recordings ==
=== Under Richard Marlow ===
- Purcell: Anthems for the Chapel Royal (Conifer)
- Poulenc - Sacred Choral Works (1988; Conifer)
- Walton: Sacred Choral Music (1989; Conifer)
- Carols from Trinity (1990; Conifer)
- Glorious Trinity (1990; Conifer)
- French Sacred Choral Works (1990; Classics)
- Brahms: Complete Motets (1990; Classics)
- Victoria: Tenebrae Responsories/Lamentations (1991; Conifer)
- Schütz: Psalmen Davids (1991; Conifer)
- Monteverdi: Dixit Dominus (1992; Conifer)
- Monteverdi - Motets (1992; Classics)
- Michael Haydn: Masses and Vespers (1993; Classics)
- Great Is The Lord (1993; Conifer)
- Miserere and Other Popular Choral Works (1993; Classics)
- A Child Is Born (1993; Classics)
- Carols from Trinity (1993; Conifer)
- Voce: An Intimate Expression of Faith Offered By the Human Voice (1994; Brentwood Music, a compilation)
- Weelkes/Tomkins - When David Heard (1994; Conifer)
- Sweelinck: Pseaumes De David (1994; Conifer)
- Bach: The Six Motets (1994; Conifer)
- Lassus - Regina coeli and Seasonal Motets (1994; Conifer)
- Praetorius - In dulci jubilo (1995; Conifer)
- Gibbons - Hosanna to the Son of David (1995; Conifer)
- The Songs of Angels (1996; Conifer)
- Britten - Sacred and Profane (1996)
- Bach Family Motets (1997; Conifer)
- Carols from Trinity (1997; Conifer)
- Choral Moods (1997; Conifer)
- Descants from Trinity (1997; Conifer)
- Sweelinck: Cantiones Sacrae, Vol.2 (1999; Hyperion)
- Sweelinck: Cantiones Sacrae, Vol.1 (1999; Hyperion)
- Hymns and Descants (2000; GMN)
- A Trinity Christmas (2001; GMN)
- Palestrina - Offertoria (2002; GMN)
- Duruflé - Complete Choral Works (2005; Chandos)
- Mendelssohn - Sacred Choral Works (2006; Chandos)
- Byrd - Cantiones sacrae (2007; Chandos)

=== Under Stephen Layton ===
- Handel - Dettingen Te Deum (2008; Hyperion)
- Poulenc - Gloria & Motets (2008; Hyperion)
- Lukaszewski - Choral Music (2008; Hyperion)
- Handel - Chandos Anthems vol. 1 (2009; Hyperion)
- Various - Baltic Exchange (2010; Hyperion)
- Briggs - Messe de Notre Dame (2010; Hyperion)
- American a cappella - Beyond all mortal dreams (2011; Hyperion)
- Howells - Requiem & other choral works (2012; Hyperion)
- Britten - A Ceremony of Carols & St Nicolas (2012; Hyperion)
- Handel - Chandos Anthems vol. 2 (2013; Hyperion)
- Bach - Christmas Oratorio (2013; Hyperion)
- Ešenvalds - Northern Lights & other choral works (2015; Hyperion)
- Leighton - Crucifixus & other choral works (2015; Hyperion)
- Various - Yulefest! (2015; Hyperion)
- Howells - Collegium Regale & other choral works (2016; Hyperion)
- Stanford - Choral Music (2017; Hyperion)
- Bach - Mass in B Minor (2018; Hyperion)
- Park - Choral works (2018; Hyperion)
- Finzi - Choral works (2019; Hyperion)
- Mäntyjärvi - Choral Music (2020; Hyperion)
- McDowall - Sacred choral music (2021; Hyperion)
- Antognini - Come to me in the silence of the night & other choral works (2023; Hyperion)
- Anthems, Vol.1 (2023; Hyperion)
- Briggs - Hail, gladdening Light & other works (2024; Hyperion)
- Duruflé: Requiem; Poulenc: Lenten Motets (2024; Hyperion)

== Directors of Music of the College ==
- George Loosemore (app. by Michaelmas 1660)
- Robert Wildbore (app. 11 Sept. 1682)
- Charles Quarles (app. 26 Dec 1688)
- Charles Quarles/John Bowman (app. 13 Aug 1709; six months alternately)
- John Bowman (app. 4 July 1717)
- James Kent (app. 25 June 1731)
- Edward Salisbury (app. 20 Nov 1738)
- William Tireman (app. 27 July 1741)
- William Tireman/John Randall (app. 13 Nov 1762)
- William Tireman (app. 11 June 1768)
- John Randall (app. 1 April 1777)
- John Clarke-Whitfeld (app. 1799)
- William Beale (app. 1 Nov 1820)
- Samuel Matthews (app. 29 Dec 1821)
- Thomas Attwood Walmisley (app. 1 Feb 1833)
- John Larkin Hopkins (app. 31 Mar 1856)
- Charles Villiers Stanford (app. 21 Feb 1874)
- Alan Gray (1893-1930)
- Hubert Stanley Middleton (b. 1890-d.1959)
- Raymond Leppard ( -1968)
- Richard Marlow (1968-2006)
- Stephen Layton (2006-2023)
- Steven Grahl (2024-)

== Organ Scholars ==
- Thomas Simpson (2024-present)
- Augustine Cox (2023-present)
- Jonathan Lee (2020)
- Harrison Cole (2019)
- Luke Fitzgerald (2019) (under the title of Associate Organist)
- Victor Matthews (2018)
- Asher Oliver (2016)
- Alexander Hamilton (2015)
- Owain Park (2013)
- Eleanor Kornas (2012)
- Jeremy Cole (2010)
- Simon Bland (2009)
- Rupert Compston (2007)
- Michael Waldron (2006)
- Max Pappenheim (2005)
- James Sherlock (2003)
- Oliver Lallemant (2002)
- Douglas Paine (2000)
- Benjamin Woodward (1999)
- Mark Williams (1997)
- Thomas Blunt (1996)
- Andrew Lamb (1994)
- Christopher Allsop (1993)
- Philip Rushforth (1991)
- Silas Wollston (1990)
- Richard Pearce (1987)
- Graham Jackson (1985)
- Charles Matthews (1984)
- Stephen Johns (1982)
- Timothy Lole (1981)
- Joseph Cullen (1978)
- Alan Woodbridge
- Alan Woodbridge (1976)
- Stephen Barlow (1972)
- Paul Halley (1970)
- Nicholas King (1968)
- Clive Haden Russell (1966)
- Ewart Agnew Boddington (1945)

== TCCA ==
In 2004 the Trinity College Choir Association ("TCCA") was formed by a group of choir alumni. It provides a framework for all current and past members of the choir, organists and clergy to keep in touch, meet up and make new acquaintances, and to keep abreast of the current activities of the choir. It also comprises a body of people to help and support the interests and the future of the choir.

== Awards and nominations ==
Year	Award and category		Work	Result	Notes
2011	APRA Awards	Work of the Year – Vocal or Choral	Deserts of Exile	Won	
2012	Gramophone Award	Choral		Won	
2012	Grammy Awards	Best Choral Performance	Beyond All Mortal Dreams - American A Cappella	Nominated	
