= Faculty of Music, University of Cambridge =

Faculty of the University of Cambridge, England

The University of Cambridge was the first institution in the world to award a dedicated Bachelor of Music degree. The Faculty of Music was established in 1947, and has this since grown into an academic centre covering all the aspects of study and research in music.

The most recent Research Assessment Exercise (2008) judged research at the Faculty to be in the highest possible category (4*) for 45% of the faculty member's research output. According to The Guardian's University Guide 2013, the Faculty has the highest ratio of staff to students in any of the top-10 institutions in the country where one can study music in the UK.

== Famous current and past members of the faculty ==
The list includes some of the musicologists, composers and musicians who are or have been active at the faculty:

- Nicholas Cook
- Ian Cross
- Ruth Davis
- Martin Ennis
- John Deathridge
- Katharine Ellis
- Iain Fenlon
- Marina Frolova-Walker
- Alexander Goehr
- Sarah Hawkins
- Christopher Hogwood
- Robin Holloway
- John Hopkins (composer)
- Nicholas Marston
- Susan Rankin
- John Rink
- Jeremy Thurlow
- David Trippett
- Benjamin Walton
