= Westminster Quarters =

Clock chime melody

The Westminster Quarters
Recording of Westminster chimes from Big Ben, broadcast on Radio Oranje, at midnight on New Year's Eve 1945

The Westminster Quarters, from its use at the Palace of Westminster, is a melody used by a set of four quarter bells to mark each quarter-hour. It is also known as the Westminster Chimes, Cambridge Quarters, or Cambridge Chimes, from its place of origin, the Church of St Mary the Great, Cambridge.

== Description ==
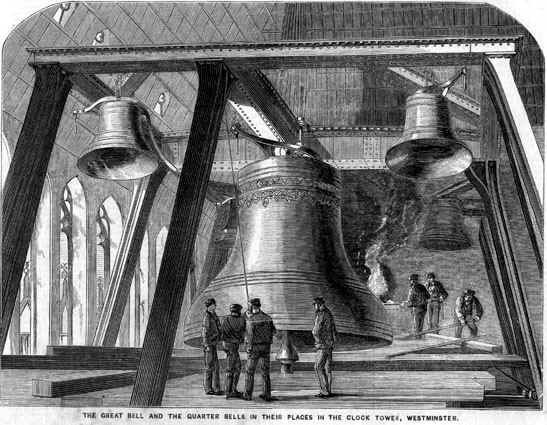
The quarter bells shown hung around Big Ben, December 1858

The Westminster Quarters are sounded by four quarter bells hung around Big Ben in the Elizabeth Tower belfry, in the Palace of Westminster. These are:

Quarter bell	Pitch	Weight	Diameter
First	G♯_{4}	1.1t	1.1m
Second	F♯_{4}	1.3t	1.2m
Third	E_{4}	1.7t	1.4m
Fourth	B_{3}	4.0t	1.8m

The quarters consist of five changes, permutations of the four pitches provided by these quarter bells (G♯_{4}, F♯_{4}, E_{4}, B_{3}) in the key E major. This generates five unique changes as follows:

1. G♯_{4}, F♯_{4}, E_{4}, B_{3}
2. E_{4}, G♯_{4}, F♯_{4}, B_{3}
3. E_{4}, F♯_{4}, G♯_{4}, E_{4}
4. G♯_{4}, E_{4}, F♯_{4}, B_{3}
5. B_{3}, F♯_{4}, G♯_{4}, E_{4}

Each of the five changes is played as three crotchets (quarter notes) and a minim (half note) and are always played in the sequence 1, 2, 3, 4, 5. This sequence of five changes is used twice every hour as follows:

First quarter, change 1.
Half hour, changes 2 and 3.
Third quarter, changes 4, 5 and 1.
The full hour, changes 2, 3, 4 and 5 followed by one strike for each hour past 12 midnight or 12 noon struck on the Great Bell known as Big Ben in E_{3}.

The number of changes used matches the number of quarter hours passed.

Because the five changes are used twice, and in the same sequence, the mechanism that trips the hammers needs to be programmed with only five changes instead of ten, reducing its complexity.

Both the third quarter and the full hour require the fourth quarter bell, B_{3}, to be rung twice in quick succession (changes 4,5,1 and 2,3,4,5); too quick for the hammer to draw back for the second strike. To address this, the fourth quarter bell is equipped with two hammers on opposite sides and becomes, effectively, a fifth bell for the mechanism to play.

The first and third quarters finish on the dominant, B, while the half and full hours finish on the tonic, E, producing the satisfying musical effect that has contributed to the popularity of the chimes.

First quarter:
Half-hour:
Third quarter:
Full hour:

== Words associated with the melody ==
The prayer inscribed on a plaque in the Big Ben clock room reads:

All through this hour
Lord be my guide
That by Thy power
No foot shall slide.

The conventional prayer is:

O Lord our God
Be Thou our guide
That by Thy help
No foot may slide.

An alternative prayer changes the third line:

O Lord our God
Be Thou our guide
So by Thy power
No foot shall slide.

A variation on this, to the same tune, is prayed at the end of Brownie meetings in the UK and Canada:

O Lord our God
Thy children call
Grant us Thy peace
And bless us all. Amen.

== History ==
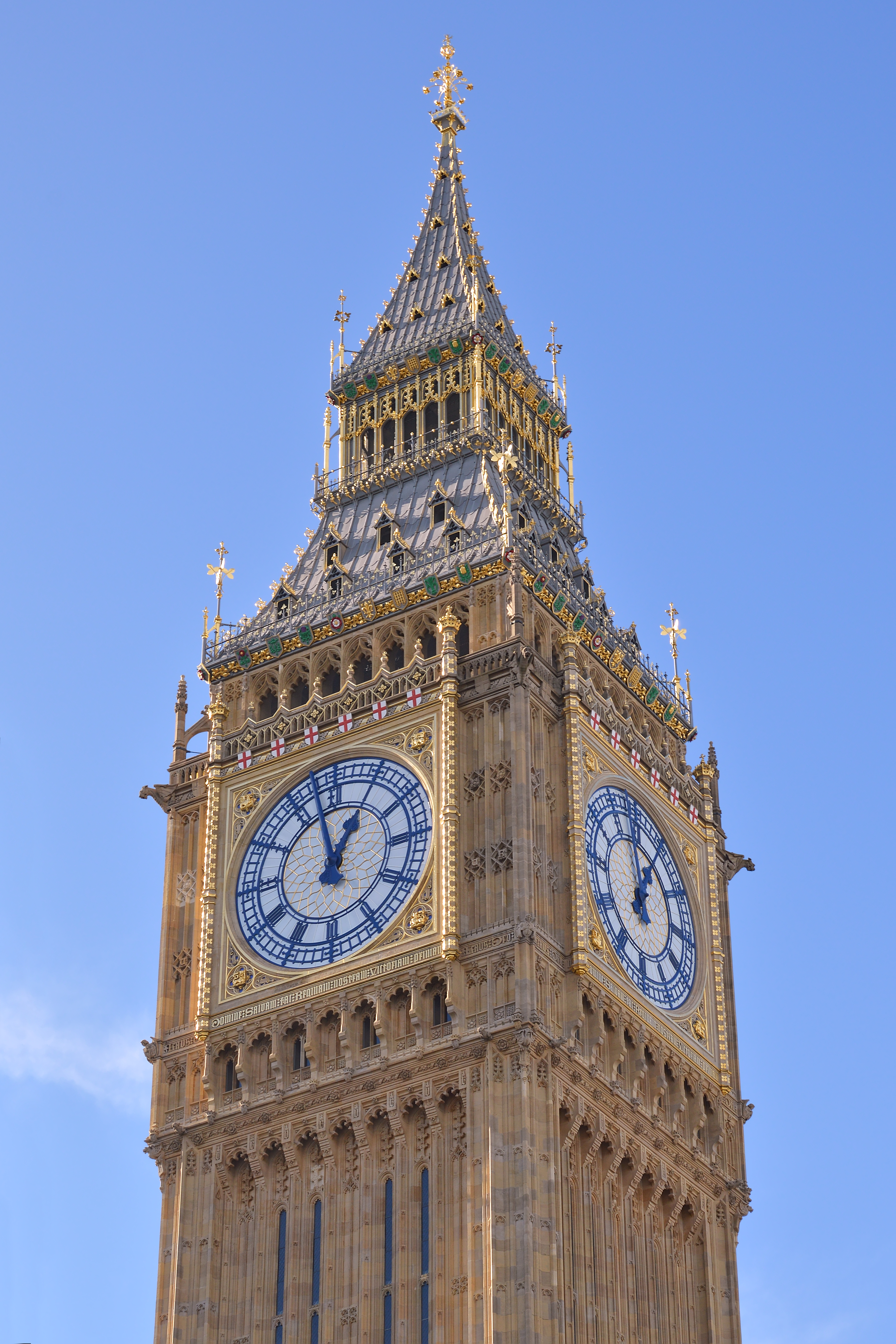
The Elizabeth Tower at the Palace of Westminster, the namesake of the chime

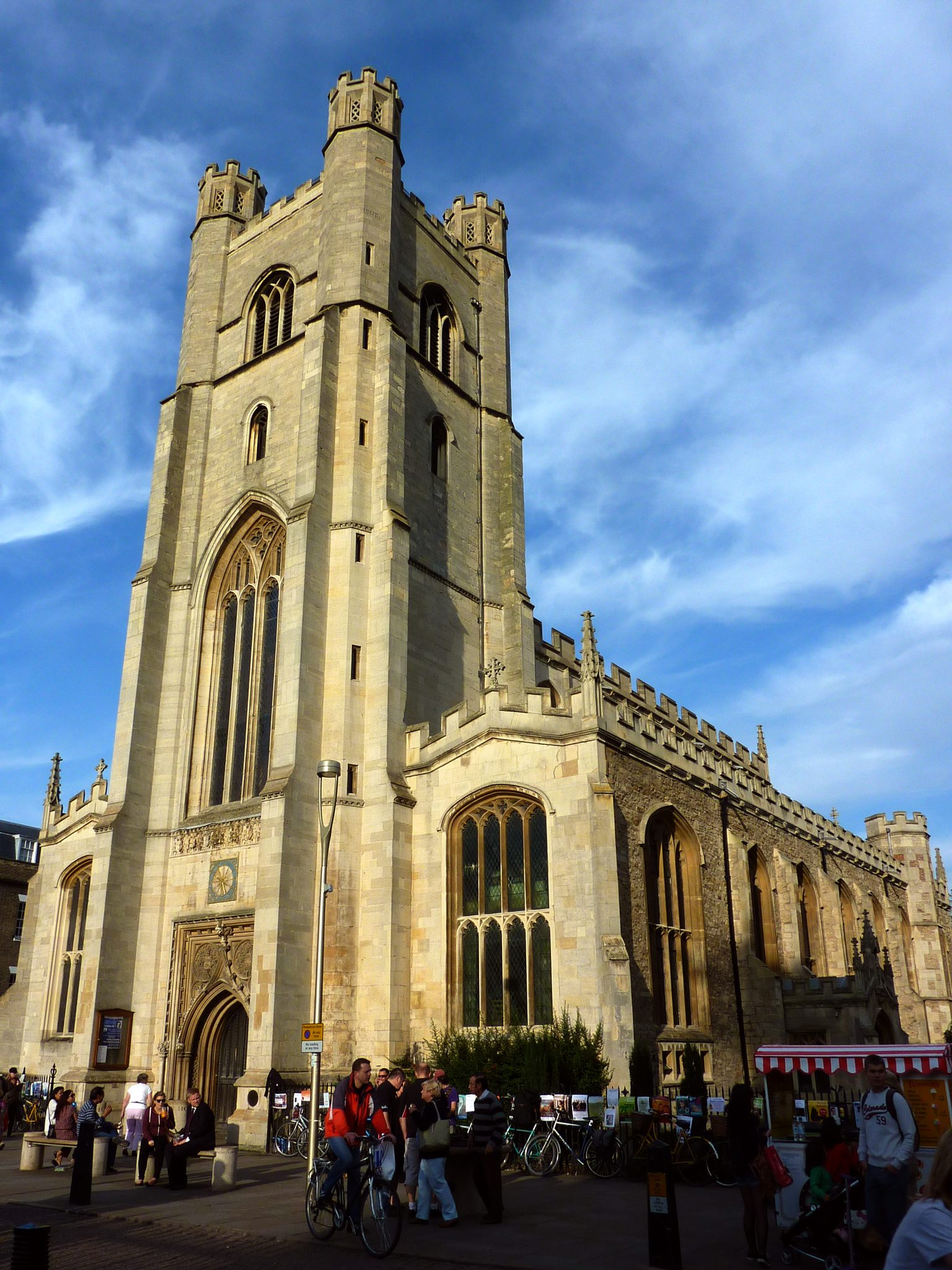
The Church of St Mary the Great, Cambridge for which the chime was written

The Westminster Quarters were originally written in 1793 for a new clock in Great St Mary's, the University Church in Cambridge. There is some doubt over exactly who composed it: Joseph Jowett, Regius Professor of Civil Law, was given the job, but he was probably assisted by either John Randall (1715–1799), who was the Professor of Music from 1755, or his undergraduate pupil, William Crotch (1775–1847). This chime is traditionally, though without substantiation, believed to be a set of variations on the four notes that make up the fifth and sixth bars of "I know that my Redeemer liveth" from Handel's Messiah. (Note: Claimed for example by Harrison, Daniel (October 2000). "Tolling Time". Music Theory Online. 6 (4). Note 16. doi:10.30535/mto.6.4.1. Harrison's note 16 in turn cites Starmer (1907), in footnote 6, so this ultimately traces back to Amp's account, who is quoted by Raven, who is quoted by Starmer.) This is why the chime is also played by the bells of the so-called Red Tower in Halle, the native town of Handel.

In 1851, the chime was adopted by Edmund Beckett Denison (an amateur horologist, and graduate of Trinity College, Cambridge, who was familiar with the Great St Mary's chime) for the new clock at the Palace of Westminster, where the bell Big Ben hangs. From there its fame spread. It is now one of the most commonly used chimes for striking clocks.

According to the church records of Trinity Episcopal Church (Williamsport, Pennsylvania), this chime sequence was incorporated into a tower clock mechanism by E. Howard & Co., Boston, Massachusetts. The clock and chime in Trinity's steeple base was dedicated in December 1875. It holds the distinction of being the first tower clock in the United States to sound the Cambridge Quarters.

== Other uses ==
- Three O'Clock in the Morning is a 1920s waltz which begins with the Westminster Quarters and incorporates the tune in its chorus. It is one of the first 20 recordings in history to sell more than 1 million copies. Films which uses this song, and consequently the Westminster Quarters, include Presenting Lily Mars (1943), Margie (1946), and Belles on Their Toes (1952), among others.
- A London Symphony by Ralph Vaughan Williams incorporates the half-hour changes, 2 and 3, near the beginning of the work and the first three changes of the hour, 2, 3 and 4, near the end.* A London Symphony by Ralph Vaughan Williams incorporates the half-hour changes, 2 and 3, near the beginning of the work and the first three changes of the hour, 2, 3 and 4, near the end.
- Light music composer Eric Coates incorporated the music into "Westminster", the Meditation and second part of his London Suite (1933).
- "The Westminster Waltz", a light orchestral piece by Robert Farnon (1956) uses the music of the chimes.
- The theme music by Ronnie Hazlehurst for the satirical TV series Yes Minister (1980–1984) and its sequel Yes, Prime Minister (1986–1988), about a British politician and his interactions with the civil servants who nominally serve him, is largely based on the chimes (though with a longer duration for the first note of each quarter, which arguably makes the derivation less obvious). When asked in an interview about its Westminster influence, Hazlehurst replied, "That's all it is. It's the easiest thing I've ever done."
- A piece called Carillon de Westminster based on the chimes was written for organ in 1927 by the French composer and organist Louis Vierne. It alters the order at certain points and introduces a new variant of chime 3.
- A composition based on the chimes was written in the ladrang form for central Javanese gamelan. It is named variously as ladrang Wesminster, ladrang Wesmister, ladrang Wèsmèster, etc.
- Indonesian train stations play the chimes as a sign of train departures and arrivals. Upon arrival, the chimes are looped continuously until departure, which may last up to 15 minutes.
- The Westminster Quarters is a common doorbell chime.
- Most schools in Japan and East Asia play the chimes to signal the end and beginning of classes.
- For the millennium New Year, a recording of the clock was released by London Records in 1999, titled "Millennium Chimes", with the artist labelled as Big Ben. It reached number 53 on the UK singles chart for the week ending 8 January 2000 (which included purchases prior to 31 December 1999).
- In the United States, electronic storm sirens commonly use the Westminster full-hour chime in place of a siren tone for regular tests to avoid confusion among the public.
- The chimes are used when the player reaches 6 a.m. in some of the Five Nights at Freddy's games.
