= Stanley Hugh Badock Professor of Music =

The Stanley Hugh Badock Professorship of Music was established in 1946 at the University of Bristol, and named after Sir Stanley Badock (died 1945), who had been Pro-Chancellor of the University.

== List of Stanley Hugh Badock Professors ==
- 1947–1958: Walter Kendall Stanton.
- 1958–1972: Willis Grant.
- 1972–1994: Raymond Henry Charles Warren.
- 1994–2002: Thomas James "Jim" Samson.
- 2003–2012: Stephen David Banfield.
- 2013–2017: Katharine Ellis.
- 2017–present: Sarah Hibberd.
