= Dunnill =

Dunnill is a surname. Notable people with the surname include:

- Peter Dunnill (1938–2009), British biochemical engineer
- William Frederick Dunnill (1880–1936), English cathedral organist
