= Edward John Hopkins =

English organist and composer

Edward Hopkins, 1897

Dr. Edward John Hopkins FRCO (30 June 1818 - 4 February 1901) was an English organist and composer. The organist and composer John Larkin Hopkins was his cousin.

== Life ==
He was born on 30 June 1818 in Westminster. He was the eldest son of George Hopkins, a clarinet player who played with the orchestra of the Royal Opera House. Two of his brothers, John (1822-1900) and Thomas Hopkins (died 1893) also became organists – John at Rochester Cathedral and Thomas at St Saviour's Church, York. His uncle Edward Hopkins (c1778-1860) was also an outstanding clarinettist and bandmaster of the Scots Guards in 1815.

In 1826 he became a chorister of the Chapel Royal under William Hawes and sang at the coronation of King William IV in Westminster Abbey in 1830. At the same time, he sang in the choir of St Paul's Cathedral, having to manage his double schedule with great dexterity. On Sunday evenings, he would play the outgoing voluntary for his organ teacher Thomas Forbes Walmisley, the father of Thomas Attwood Walmisley, at St Martin's-in-the-Fields. He left the Chapel Royal in 1834 and started studying organ construction at two organ factories.

His first organist appointment was at Mitcham Church. He played in a blind audition against several other organists and won first place in the auditions. The committee, on seeing that he was only sixteen, were reluctant to appoint him but his friend James Turle, the organist at Westminster Abbey, where Hopkins had played as a stand-in for Turle, informed them of the fact and he was appointed.

After four years at Mitcham Church, he became organist at the Church of St Peter, Islington and in 1841, he became organist at St Luke's, Berwick St, Soho (demolished 1936). He held that position for two years before becoming organist at Temple Church (succeeding George Warne) which held a historic organ built in 1683 under the auspices of the Benchers. He held this position for many years.

Closely associated with the Bach Society he was organist in the first English performances of Bach's St Matthew Passion under the direction of William Sterndale Bennett

In 1855 he collaborated with Edward Rimbault in the publication of The Organ: Its History and Construction. In 1864 he was one of the founders of the College of Organists, later the Royal College of Organists. In 1882 he received an honorary Doctorate in Music from the Archbishop of Canterbury.

== Appointments ==
- Organist in Mitcham Parish Church, Surrey 1834 - 1838
- Organist of St Peter's Church, Islington 1838 - 1841
- Organist of St Luke's Church, Berwick Street, London 1841 - 1843
- Organist of Temple Church 1843 - 1898

== Compositions ==
He composed over 30 hymn tunes, and some psalm chants, which are widely used in the Church of England to this day.

Cultural offices
Preceded by George Warne	Organist of Temple Church; 1843-1898	Succeeded by Henry Walford Davies
