= Edwin Stephenson =

Edwin Stephenson may refer to:

- Edwin Stephenson (cricketer) (1832–1898), English cricketer
- Edwin Stephenson (organist) (1871–1922), English cathedral organist
