= Stephen Banfield =

Musicologist and historian (born 1951)

Stephen David Banfield (born 1951) is a British musicologist, music historian and retired academic. He was Elgar Professor of Music at the University of Birmingham from 1992 to 2003, and then Stanley Hugh Badock Professor of Music at the University of Bristol from 2003 to his retirement at the end of 2012; he has since been an emeritus professor at Bristol.

== Biography ==
Banfield was educated at Clare College, Cambridge; St John's College, Oxford; and Harvard University, where he was a Frank Knox Fellow. His D.Phil. was awarded by the University of Oxford in 1979 for his thesis "Solo song in England from 1900 to 1940: Critical studies of the late flowering of a romantic genre". During the 1970s he was an occasional composer: his Capriccio for recorder and piano (1972) and Three Miniatures for descant recorder (1974) have been recorded.

In 1978, he was appointed to a lectureship at Keele University, where he was later promoted to senior lecturer in 1988. He remained there until his appointment at Birmingham in 1992. He was head of the school of performance at Birmingham between 1992 and 1997, and Birmingham's department of music from 1996 to 1998; he was also head of the School of Arts at Bristol in 2006 and from 2010 to 2012. While at Bristol he founded CHOMBEC, the Centre for the History of Music in Britain, the Empire and the Commonwealth, to encourage and provide a focal point for research into the history of music in the British Empire, in Britain, and within the West Country. Some of the fruits of this activity emerged in 2018 with the publication of his Music in the West Country (2018), described as "the first regional history of music in England".

Banfield's comprehensive, two volume study of early twentieth century English song, first published in 1985, is notable for its incorporation of both literary and musical scholarship alongside a performance perspective. In 1997 Banfield was commissioned by the Finzi Trust to write the first full length biography of Gerald Finzi. For the BBC, Banfield wrote and presented a four part broadcast series on the neglected tradition of British orchestral light music, The Light Brigade, in August 1995. He organized a revival of Granville Bantock's hour-long orchestral song cycle Sappho at Birmingham in 1996.

His work also includes in-depth studies of the American musical theatre composers Jerome Kern and Stephen Sondheim. While at Birmingham he orchestrated from the existing piano scores Sondheim's first (and then unperformed) musical Saturday Night, holding a study day presentation of excerpts in 1994, advising the Bridewell Theatre's world premiere in 1997, and staging a full production at the university in 1998.

== Selected publications ==
- Sensibility and English Song: Critical Studies of the Early 20th Century (Cambridge University Press, 1985).
- Sondheim's Broadway Musicals (University of Michigan Press, 1993).
- (Editor) The Blackwell History of Music in Britain, vol. 6 (Blackwell, 1995).
- 'Sondheim and the Art that has No Name', in Approaches to the American Musical, ed. Robert Lawson-Peebles (1996)
- Gerald Finzi: An English Composer (Faber and Faber, 1997).
- 'England: art and commercial music' (2001), (10,000 word essay in Grove Music Online)
- 'Albion Attractions', review, The Musical Times, Vol. 143, No. 1881 (Winter, 2002), pp. 66-69 (4 pages)
- Jerome Kern, Yale Broadway Masters (Yale University Press, 2006).
- The Sounds of Stonehenge (ed.) (Archaeopress, 2009).
- (Co-edited with Nicholas Temperley) Music and the Wesleys (University of Illinois Press, 2010).
- 'English Musical Comedy, 1890-1924', in The Oxford Handbook of the British Musical, ed. Robert Gordon and Olaf Jubin (2016), pp. 117-42
- Music in the West Country: Social and Cultural History Across an English Region (Boydell, 2018).

Academic offices
Preceded by Jim Samson	Stanley Hugh Badock Professor of Music, University of Bristol; 2003–2012	Succeeded by Katharine Ellis
