= St Luke's Church, Berwick Street =

St Luke's Church was an Anglican church in Berwick Street, in the City of Westminster, London. It was built in 1839, on the site of a Huguenot church of 1689 and an Anglican chapel of ease of the 18th century. It was demolished in 1936.

== History ==
A church in Berwick Street (at coordinates 51°30′47.0″N 0°8′4.2″W) was opened in 1689. It was one of two non-conforming churches in London known as La Patente (the other being in Spitalfields), a licence having been granted by James II to a group of French church ministers to establish churches for Huguenot refugees in London. When in 1694 ministers and congregation moved to a new building in Little Chapel Street (now Sheraton Street), three ministers and part of the congregation remained, the church being known as L'Ancienne Patente or La Vieille Patente.

In 1707, when there was no longer a congregation, it was proposed by the rector of the vestry of St James's parish that the building be purchased and made into a chapel of ease for the parish. The chapel, which may have been rebuilt, was completed the following year. There were repairs in the 1760s, and in 1766 the chapel acquired the organ from Tenison Chapel in King Street. The freehold was purchased in 1801.

=== Nineteenth and twentieth centuries ===
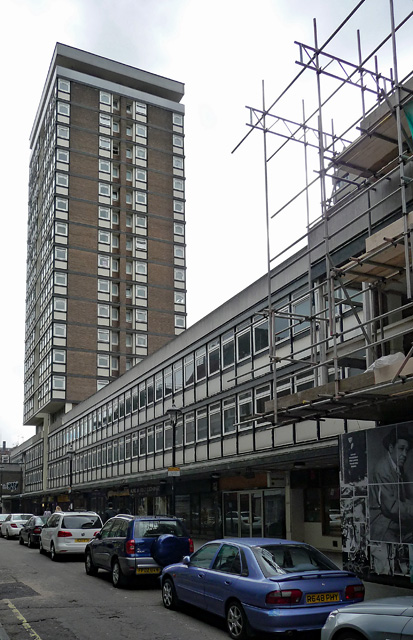
Kemp House in Berwick Street, on the site of St Luke's Church

The Church Building Commissioners were consulted about a proposal to erect a new chapel elsewhere, since by 1833 the district was judged to be no longer respectable. The Commissioners stipulated that they would assist only in building a new church on the existing site. This was carried out: the freehold was conveyed to the Commissioners in 1835, and on 15 March 1838 Thomas de Grey, 2nd Earl de Grey laid the first stone. The new church, designed by Edward Blore and dedicated to St Luke, was consecrated on 23 July 1839.

An ecclesiastical district of St Luke was established in 1841. Because of the poverty of the area, pew rent was abandoned by 1863. The district became in 1935 part of the neighbouring parish of St Anne; the church was demolished the following year.

Kemp House, a 14-storey residential block built in 1960, now stands on the site.

== Incumbents and organists ==
Incumbents of St Luke's include the following:

William Henry Brookfield was curate from 1841. Francis Marendaz was minister at his death on 10 June 1842. Thomas Henry Jones was curate from 1854 to 1857. Stanley Leathes was curate in 1858; John Oakley was curate in 1858. Henry Wace was curate from 1861 to 1863.

John Festing was vicar from 1873. His biographer Ernest Pearce (1912) describes that "he was appointed to the vicarage of St Luke, Berwick Street, a poor parish close to Seven Dials, which had recently been visited by cholera. Festing increased his reputation here for pastoral diligence, and on 19 May 1878 John Jackson, bishop of London, collated him to the important vicarage of Christ Church, Albany Street".

Arnold Whitaker Oxford was vicar in 1883.

Edward John Hopkins was organist of the church from 1841 to 1843.

From 1851 to 1856 the assistant curate was Henry Whitehead, who, with John Snow and others, investigated the local cholera epidemic in 1854 and thus discovered the water-borne transmission of cholera.
