= Amalia Arvaniti =

American linguist

- Awards: European Research Council Advanced Grant

Academic background
- Education: University of Cambridge (PhD, MPhil), University of Athens (BA)
- Thesis: The phonetics of Modern Greek rhythm and its phonological implications (1991)
- Doctoral advisor: Sarah Hawkins

Academic work
- Discipline: linguistics
- Sub-discipline: phonetics, phonology, prosody, bilingualism, sociophonetics
- Institutions: Radboud University (2020-), University of Kent (2012-2020), UC San Diego (2002-2012), University of Cyprus (1995-2001)
- Website: https://www.amaliaarvaniti.info/

Amalia Arvaniti (Greek: Αμαλία Αρβανίτη) is a Greek linguist and Professor and Chair of English Language and Linguistics at Radboud University. She is known for her works on phonetics, phonology, and prosody, particularly intonation and speech rhythm.

== Biography ==
Arvaniti completed her Ph.D. in Linguistics at the University of Cambridge under the supervision of Sarah Hawkins.

== Research ==
Arvaniti is a former editor of the Journal of the International Phonetic Association (2015-2019).
