= Sam McCready (actor) =

Northern Irish actor, theatre director, and playwright (1936–2019)

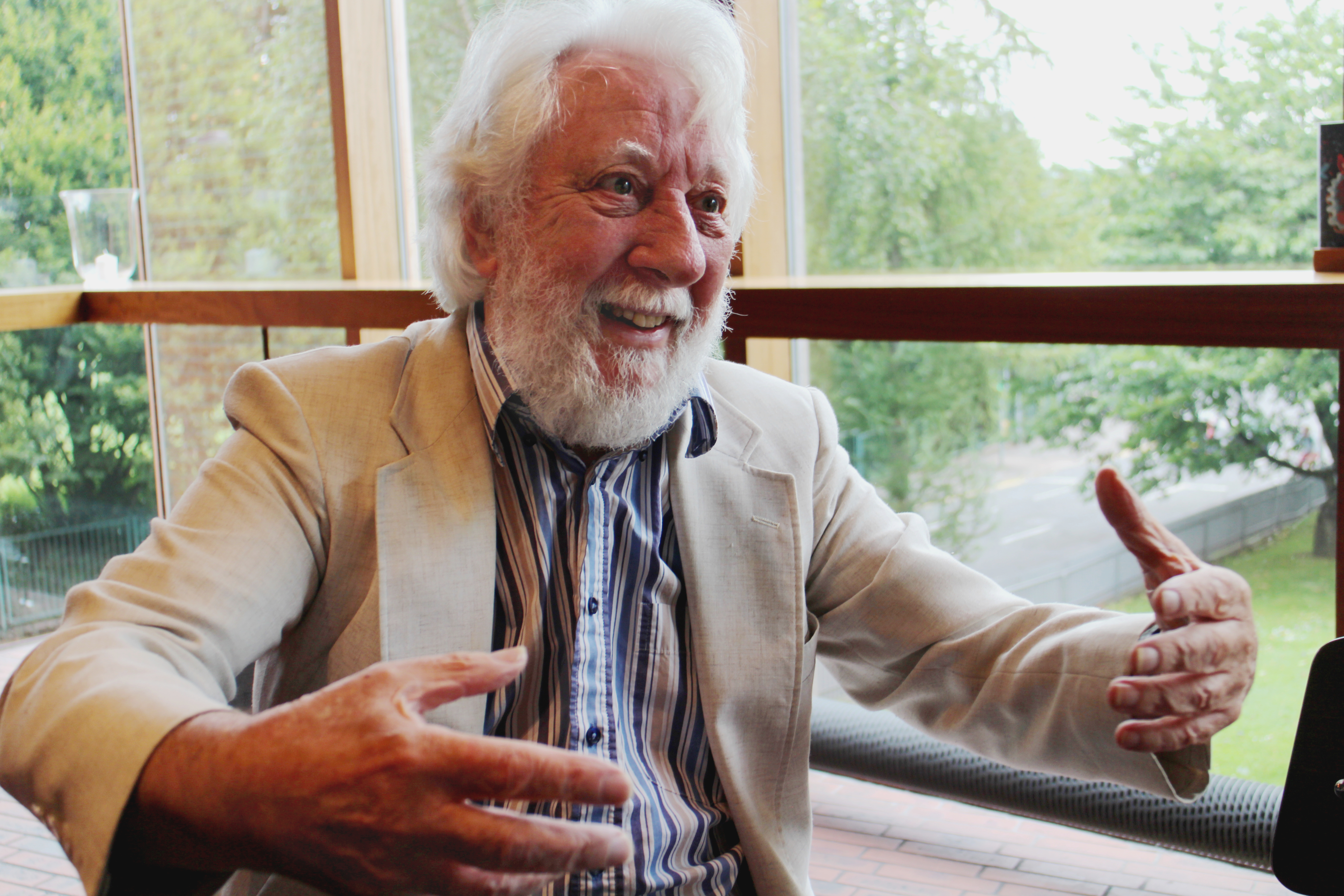
Sam McCready at Lyric Theatre, Belfast, 2017

Sam McCready (22 November 1936 – 10 February 2019) was an actor, theatre director and playwright who was born in Belfast, Northern Ireland. One of 13 children of David and Sarah McCready, he lived in Northern Ireland and in the United States with his wife Joan Carslake whom he met in 1958 at Stranmillis College, Belfast, and married in 1962. They had two children.

Sam McCready was a founder member of the Lyric Theatre, Belfast, with whom he founded the Lyric Youth Theatre (1968), and later still the Lyric Drama Studio (1978). He performed and directed theatre productions in Europe and the US, and with Joan McCready was the founder and co-Artistic Director of Two-for-One Productions, a touring company which specializes in small-scale productions. He conducted the Drama Workshop at the Yeats International Summer School, Sligo regularly from 1999.

He also gained a reputation as a painter with major exhibitions in Ireland and the United States. He was represented by ArtisAnn Gallery, Bloomfield Avenue, Belfast.

== Early life and education ==
Born in East Belfast, he moved to Hillsborough, County Down, when the family home at 6 Tower Street was destroyed in the Belfast Blitz. There he attended St. John's Primary School, Hillsborough, and returned to Belfast in 1945, living with his parents at 144 Connsbrook Avenue. He attended Strand Primary School (1945–48), and Grosvenor High School (1948–1954). After completing his Senior Certificate, he accepted a post as Permanent Clerk, Northern Ireland Civil Service, Family Allowances Branch (1954–1956).

He returned to full-time education in 1956, starting his teacher training at Stranmillis University College and graduating with a Cert. Ed (with Special Merit) in 1960.

== Academic career ==
His first teaching appointment was at Fane Street School, an unreorganised primary school in Belfast, where he taught Art (1960–62). He was appointed Advertising Manager at Berkshire Hosiery, Newtownards in 1962 but returned to full-time teaching as Head of Drama at Orangefield Boys' Secondary School in 1964, followed by his appointment as Head of English.

In 1969, he accepted a post in the Drama Department at University College of North Wales, where he completed his MA (1969–1978). and was appointed Head of Drama, Stranmillis Training College (1978–1982). An invitation to direct in New York brought him to the US, where he was appointed Professor of Theatre, University of Maryland, Baltimore County, a position he held with distinction until his retirement from full-time teaching in 2001. From then on he maintained, with his wife Joan McCready, a successful theatre career as actor, playwright and director.

== Professional training ==
McCready was trained at the Guildhall School of Music and Drama (LGSM) and the London Academy of Music and Dramatic Art (LLCM).

The plays he directed include A Time to Speak, a dramatisation of the Holocaust memoir by Helen Lewis, which was performed at the Lyric Theatre, Belfast.

== Death ==
Sam McCready died in the United States on 10 February 2019, aged 82.

== Plays and publications ==
- Lucille Lortel: The Queen of Off-Broadway (1993)
- A William Butler Yeats Encyclopedia (1997)
- Coole Lady: The Extraordinary Story of Lady Gregory (2005)
- Baptism by Fire: My Life with Mary O’Malley and the Lyric Players (2008)
- The Great Yeats! : Remarkable Father of a Remarkable Family (2010)
- A Time to Speak: adapted from the Holocaust memoir by Helen Lewis (2011)
- Dickens at the Ulster Hall (2012)
- Percy French: Melodies of Unforgotten Years (2014)
- No Surrender: adapted from the memoir of a Belfast childhood by Robert Harbinson (2018)
