= Phyllis Weliver =

American historian

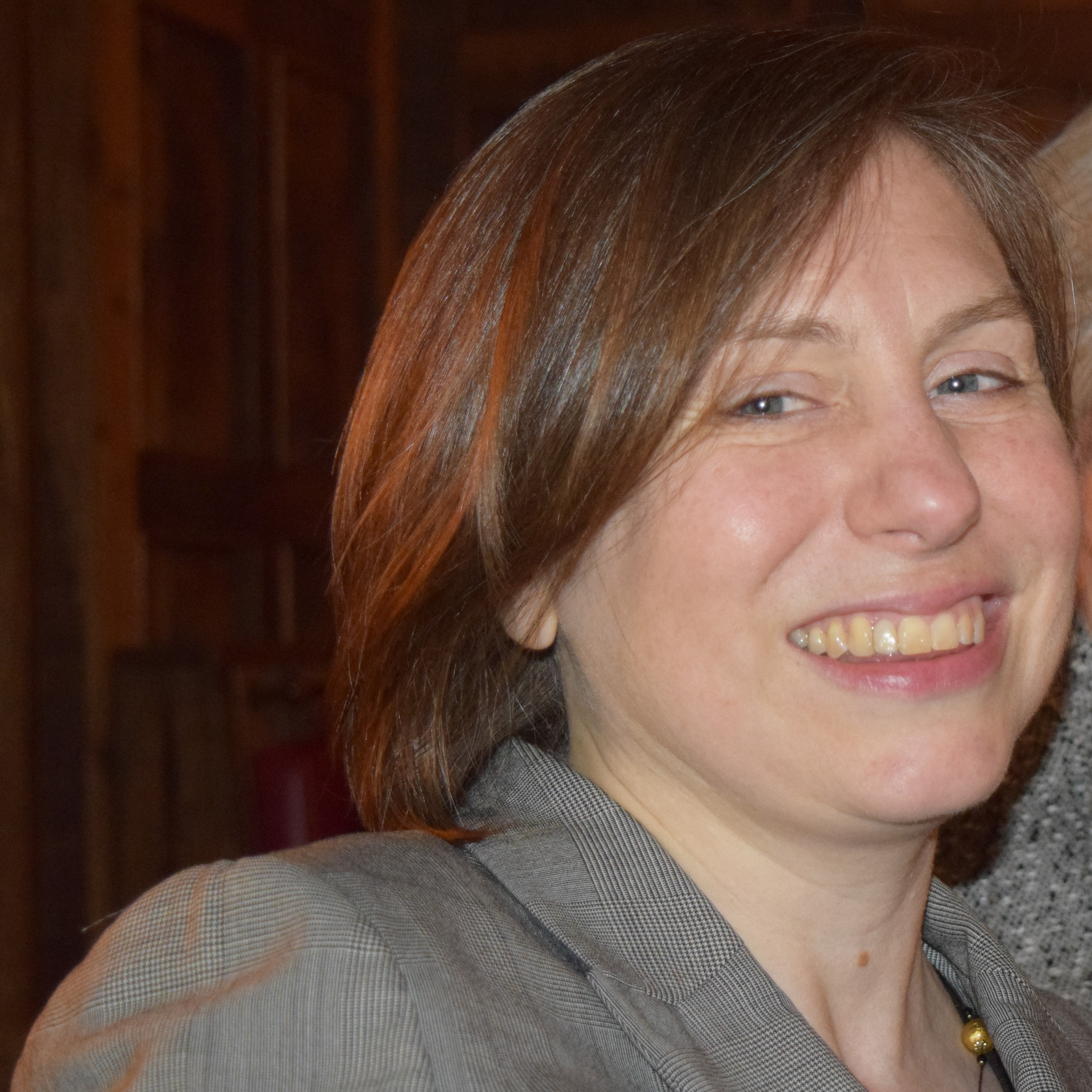
- Phyllis Weliver in London, March 2018
- Occupation: Academic

Phyllis Weliver is an American academic specializing in Victorian literature and music history.

== Career ==
Weliver completed first degrees at Oberlin College, Oberlin Conservatory of Music, and the University of Cambridge, and her doctoral studies at the University of Sussex. She taught at Wilkes University, and is now Professor of English at Saint Louis University.

In 2011, Weliver became a lifetime Fellow of Gladstone's Library in Wales. She was Macgeorge Fellow at Melbourne Conservatorium of Music and Sugden Fellow at Queen's College, Melbourne in 2024. In 2020, she was Visiting Research Fellow at the Faculty of Music, University of Cambridge. Weliver was a Visiting Scholar at St Catharine's College, Cambridge in 2020, as well as for two terms in the 2013-2014 academic year. She received a National Endowment for the Humanities Fellowship in 2015, and a National Endowment for the Humanities Summer Stipend in 2004.

Her publications focus on the nineteenth-century novel, Victorian poetry, and music in nineteenth-century Britain. In 2016, she began Sounding Tennyson, the first test case for adding sound to the International Image Interoperability Framework (IIIF). She has also contributed to BBC Two Television and to BBC Radio 3.

== Selected publications ==
- Reading Texts in Music and Literature of the Long Nineteenth Century, eds Phyllis Weliver and Katharine Ellis, Boydell & Brewer (2025)
- Victorian Poetry, 60.2, Special issue on Victorian Poetry and the Salon, eds Linda K. Hughes and Phyllis Weliver (Summer 2022): 105–275
- Mary Gladstone and the Victorian Salon: Music, Literature, Liberalism, Cambridge (2017)
- Words and Notes in the Long Nineteenth Century, eds Phyllis Weliver and Katharine Ellis, Boydell & Brewer (2013)
- The Musical Crowd in English Fiction, 1840–1910: Class, Culture and Nation, Palgrave Macmillan (2006)
- The Figure of Music in Nineteenth-Century British Poetry, ed. Phyllis Weliver, Ashgate (2005); Routledge (2016)
- Women Musicians in Victorian Fiction, 1860–1900: Representations of Music, Science and Gender in the Leisured Home, Ashgate (2000); Routledge (2016)
- Sounding Tennyson
