= Antony Manini =

British violinist

Antony Manini (or Anthony Manini, 1750–1786) was a British violinist.

== Life ==
Manini was from Norfolk. It is believed that his family may have immigrated from Italy to England.

== Career ==
He is known to have been a regular violin player at the St. John's College Hall, Cambridge University. He has also played concerts at Emmanuel College, Trinity College, Caius College Hall and Kings College Hall.

He was a contemporary of Charles Hague.

== Works ==
The British Museum contains the only copy known of his "Six Divertimentos for Two Violins". Each consists of two parts only.
