= John Hopkins (composer) =

British composer (born 1949)

- Born: Polegate, East Sussex, UK
- Occupation: composer

John Hopkins (born in 1949, at Polegate in East Sussex) is a British composer.

== Education ==
Hopkins studied at University College Cardiff. There his teachers included Alun Hoddinott and Arnold Whittall. He also took composition lessons with Peter Maxwell Davies. He graduated in 2000 from University of Sussex with a D.Phil.

== Career ==
Hopkins was elected as a regional composer-in-residence by the Eastern Arts Association (now Arts Council England East) in 1979. After several teaching positions, including being co-ordinator of Practice-Based Studies at the Faculty of Music (University of Cambridge), and Director of Studies for Music at Homerton College, Cambridge, he is now Composer in Residence at Homerton College, Cambridge.

== Works ==
His For the Far Journey (1981) was commissioned and premièred by the Geminii Ensemble and has been described as illustrating characteristics of Hopkin's music, namely 'attractive textures and effective pacing'. White Winter, Black Spring is a composition for two voices and large instrumental ensemble; Hopkins used poems by Robert Lowell for this work commissioned by the BBC.

== Some major pieces ==
- For the Far Journey (1981)
- The Magic Mountain (1983)
- White Winter, Black Spring (1985)
- Faustus (1986)
- Double Concerto for trumpet and saxophone (1994)
- Akhmatova Songs (2005)
- The Floating World, for mezzo-soprano and orchestra (2008)
- Watching the Perseids (2008)
