= Willis Grant =

English organist

Willis Grant (1 May 1907 – 9 November 1981) was an English cathedral organist, who served in St. Philip's Cathedral, Birmingham.

== Background ==
Willis Grant was born on 1 May 1907 in Bolton, Lancashire. He was educated at Astley Bridge School. He studied the organ with Walter Williams of Bury and Edward Bairstow at York Minster.

Whilst at Lincoln he was Music Master at South Park High School, Conductor of the Great Burton Choral Society, and Lecturer in Music for the Extra-Mural department of the University of Nottingham. In 1934 he became a Doctor of Music (Dunelm) and was the youngest Doctor of Music in the country.

From 1934 to 1937 he was Lecturer in Music at Sheffield University. From 1938 to 1939 he was Tutor for the Special Music Course at the City of Sheffield Technical College.

During World War II he served with the Royal Army Service Corps, 1941–1942 and was a Major in the Royal Army Educational Corps in the Indian Command lecturing on music, 1942–1946.

From 1948 he was head of music at King Edward's School, Birmingham. His eminent pupil Harrison Oxley was his Assistant until leaving for Christ Church, Oxford in 1951. From 1958 to 1972, Grant was professor of music at the University of Bristol.

He founded the Birmingham Bach Society in 1947

In 1958, Willis Grant was invited to become the Stanley Hugh Baddock Professor of Music at Bristol University, and he held this post until his retirement in 1972.

He died on 9 November 1981.

== Career ==
Assistant Organist of:

- Lincoln Cathedral 1931–1936

Organist of:

- Church of All Souls, Bolton 1929–1931
- St. Philip's Cathedral, Birmingham 1936–1958

Cultural offices
Preceded by William Frederick Dunnill	Organist and Master of the Choristers, St. Philip's Cathedral, Birmingham; 1936–1958	Succeeded by Thomas Tunnard
Academic offices
Preceded by W. K. Stanton	Stanley Hugh Badock Professor of Music, University of Bristol; 1958–1972	Succeeded by Raymond Warren
