= Professor of Music (Cambridge) =

The Professorship of Music was founded in 1684, and is one of the oldest professorships at the University of Cambridge.

== List of Professors of Music ==
- 1684 Nicholas Staggins
- 1705 Thomas Tudway
- 1730 Maurice Greene
- 1755 John Randall
- 1799 Charles Hague
- 1821 John Clarke Whitfield
- 1836 Thomas Attwood Walmisley
- 1856 William Sterndale Bennett
- 1875 George Alexander Macfarren
- 1887 Charles Villiers Stanford
- 1924 Charles Wood
- 1926–1941 Edward Joseph Dent
- 1946 Patrick Arthur Sheldon Hadley
- 1962 Robert Thurston Dart
- 1965 Robin Orr
- 1976 Alexander Goehr
- 1999 Roger Parker
- 2009 Nicholas Cook
- 2017 Katharine Ellis
