= Katharine Ellis =

British musicologist and academic

Katharine Ellis FBA MAE

Academic background
- Education: University College, Oxford; Guildhall School of Music

Academic work
- Discipline: Musicology and cultural history
- Sub-discipline: History of music; France in the long nineteenth century; Music of France
- Institutions: St Anne's College, Oxford; Open University; Royal Holloway, University of London; Institute of Musical Research, School of Advanced Study; University of Bristol; Faculty of Music, University of Cambridge; Selwyn College, Cambridge

Katharine Ellis, FBA, MAE is a British musicologist and academic, specialising in music history. Since 2017, she has been the 1684 Professor of Music at the University of Cambridge. She previously taught at the Open University, at Royal Holloway, University of London and at the School of Advanced Study, University of London, before serving as Stanley Hugh Badock Professor of Music at the University of Bristol (2013–2017).

== Early life and education ==
Ellis studied at University College, Oxford, graduating with Bachelor of Arts (BA) and Doctor of Philosophy (DPhil) degrees. She also studied the violin at the Guildhall School of Music. Her DPhil was awarded in 1991 for a doctoral thesis titled "La revue et gazette musicale de Paris, 1834-1880: the state of music criticism in mid nineteenth-century France".

== Academic career ==
Ellis's first post in her academic career was as a junior research fellow in French studies at St Anne's College, Oxford Then, from 1991 to 1994, she lectured with the Open University. In 1994, she joined Royal Holloway, University of London as a lecturer. She was additionally the inaugural Director of the Institute of Musical Research, which was then based at the School of Advanced Study, University of London, between February 2006 and July 2009.

In 2013, Ellis joined the University of Bristol as its next Stanley Hugh Badock Professor of Music. She gave her inaugural lecture on 13 February 2014. In August 2016, it was announced that she would be the next 1684 Professor of Music at the University of Cambridge, in succession to Nicholas Cook. She took up the chair in June 2017, and was also elected a Fellow of Selwyn College, Cambridge.

=== Research ===
Ellis's research centres on the cultural history of music in France in the long nineteenth century. She also has interests in musical tastes and practices, women's musical careers, music criticism, and music in fiction.

== Honours ==
In 2010, Ellis was elected a Member of the Academia Europaea. In 2013, she was elected a Fellow of the British Academy (FBA), the United Kingdom's national academy for the humanities and social sciences. Ellis was elected in 2017 to the American Philosophical Society.

== Selected works ==
- Ellis, Katharine (1995). Music Criticism in Nineteenth-Century France. Cambridge: Cambridge University Press. ISBN 978-0521454438.
- Ellis, Katharine (2005). Interpreting the Musical Past: Early Music in Nineteenth-Century France. Oxford: Oxford University Press. ISBN 978-0199710850.
- Ellis, Katharine (2008). "The Making of a Dictionary: François-Joseph Fétis, Aristide Farrenc, and the "Biographie universelle des musiciens". Revue belge de Musicologie / Belgisch Tijdschrift voor Muziekwetenschap. 62: 63–78. JSTOR 25486037.
- Ellis, Katharine (2013). The politics of plainchant in fin-de-siècle France. Burlington, VT: Ashgate. ISBN 978-1409463733.
- Weliver, Phyllis; Ellis, Katharine, eds. (2013). Words and Notes in the Long Nineteenth Century. Woodbridge: Boydell & Brewer. ISBN 978-1843838111.

Academic offices
Preceded by Stephen Banfield	Stanley Hugh Badock Professor of Music; University of Bristol; 2013 to 2017	Succeeded by Sarah Hibberd
Preceded by Nicholas Cook	1684 Professor of Music; University of Cambridge; 2017 to present	Incumbent
