= Helen Lewis (choreographer) =

Northern Irish choreographer (1916–2009)

- Born: Helena Katz; 22 June 1916; Trutnov, Bohemia, Austria-Hungary
- Died: 31 December 2009 (aged 93); Belfast, Northern Ireland
- Other name: Helena Hermann
- Occupations: dance teacher, choreographer
- Known for: A Time to Speak, autobiography
- Spouse(s): Paul Hermann (1938–1945; his death); Harry Lewis (1947–1991; his death)
- Children: Two sons: Michael Lewis; Robin Lewis

Helen Lewis MBE (née Helena Katz; 22 June 1916 – 31 December 2009) was a pioneer of modern dance in Northern Ireland, and made her name as a dance teacher and choreographer. A survivor of the Holocaust, she was also known for her memoir of her experiences during the Second World War.

== Early life ==
Helena Katz was born in 1916 into a German-speaking Jewish family in Trutnov in Bohemia, Austria-Hungary (now in the Czech Republic). After she completed study at the Realgymnasium of Trutnov in 1935, she and her mother, an accomplished singer and pianist, moved to Prague; her father had died in the previous year.

In Prague, she studied dance with Milča Mayerová, who had trained with Rudolf Laban. Katz also studied philosophy at the German University of Prague, and took private lessons in French. In about 1936 she met Paul Hermann, a Czech from a Jewish family, and in 1938, after she had finished her dance training and her university exams, they were married. She taught as an assistant at Mayerová's dance school, and experimented with choreography.

== War years ==
In what became, following the German occupation in March 1939, the Protectorate of Bohemia and Moravia, the Hermanns experienced a progressive exclusion of Jews from public life. Italy's entry into the war in June 1940, dashed their hopes of an escape via Trieste for the refuge offered in Shanghai.

=== Theresienstadt Ghetto ===
Deportations of Jewish families began in August 1941. Preceded by their parents, the Hermanns were sent in August 1942 to Theresienstadt/Terezín ghetto and concentration camp. Helen found work in a children's home where, with the rest of the staff, she "deliberately and actively disobeyed the 'no schooling' orders".

She also participated, including as a dancer, in the "rich and varied cultural life" in the ghetto which "flourished in the face of starvation, disease and the constant threat of deportation to the east". This, she recalls was first resisted by authorities but then used for propaganda (toward the end of 1944, plays, concerts and other cultural activities were staged under the close supervision of the SS to deceive visitors from the International Red Cross and were documented in a film depicting the camp as a spa town).

=== Stutthof KZ ===
In May 1944, the Hermanns were transferred to the family camp at Auschwitz-Birkenau and separated. In August, Helen, who survived two "selections" by Josef Mengele, was sent in a group of three hundred women to Stutthof concentration camp in northern Poland.

They were assigned to a satellite camp outside Praust/Pruszcz Gdański where they had been preceded by a group of five hundred women from Poland, the Baltic states, Hungary and Romania. These women spoke Yiddish, rather than German, and "bitterly resented" both the newcomers' "lack of religious ardour" and the privilege they had enjoyed in retaining their unshaven hair. The gulf between the two groups was bridged when, in "battle of wills" with their SS overseer (Oberaufseherin), they held to fast in honour of Yom Kippur. Perversely, they were rewarded with a post-fast meal complete with sweet pudding

Unexpected rations were again available two months later when the Oberaufseherin encouraged Helen and fellow inmates to stage Christmas and New Year reviews featuring dramatic sketches, music, singing, and, with Helen as choreographer and performer (the valse from Delibes's Coppelia), dancing. The "quirky" indulgences came to an end when on 27 January 1945 when the camp was evacuated.

=== After liberation ===
With those surviving prisoners able to walk, Helen was driven west toward Lauenburg. It was a death march from which on 11 March 1945, having been abandoned, wracked with typhoid fever, in the snow, she escaped into the care of the advancing Soviet forces. After a period of hospitalisation, she returned to Prague where she learned, first of the death of her husband Paul on a forced march from the Sachsenhausen sub-camp Schwarzheide, and then of her mother's fate, deported early in 1942, and murdered at Sobibór extermination camp.

Helen began to correspond with Harry Lewis (Lewy), a former beau from Trutnov who, now in Belfast, Northern Ireland, had seen her name on a Red Cross list of survivors. They married in June 1947 in the Old Town Hall in Prague.

== Belfast ==
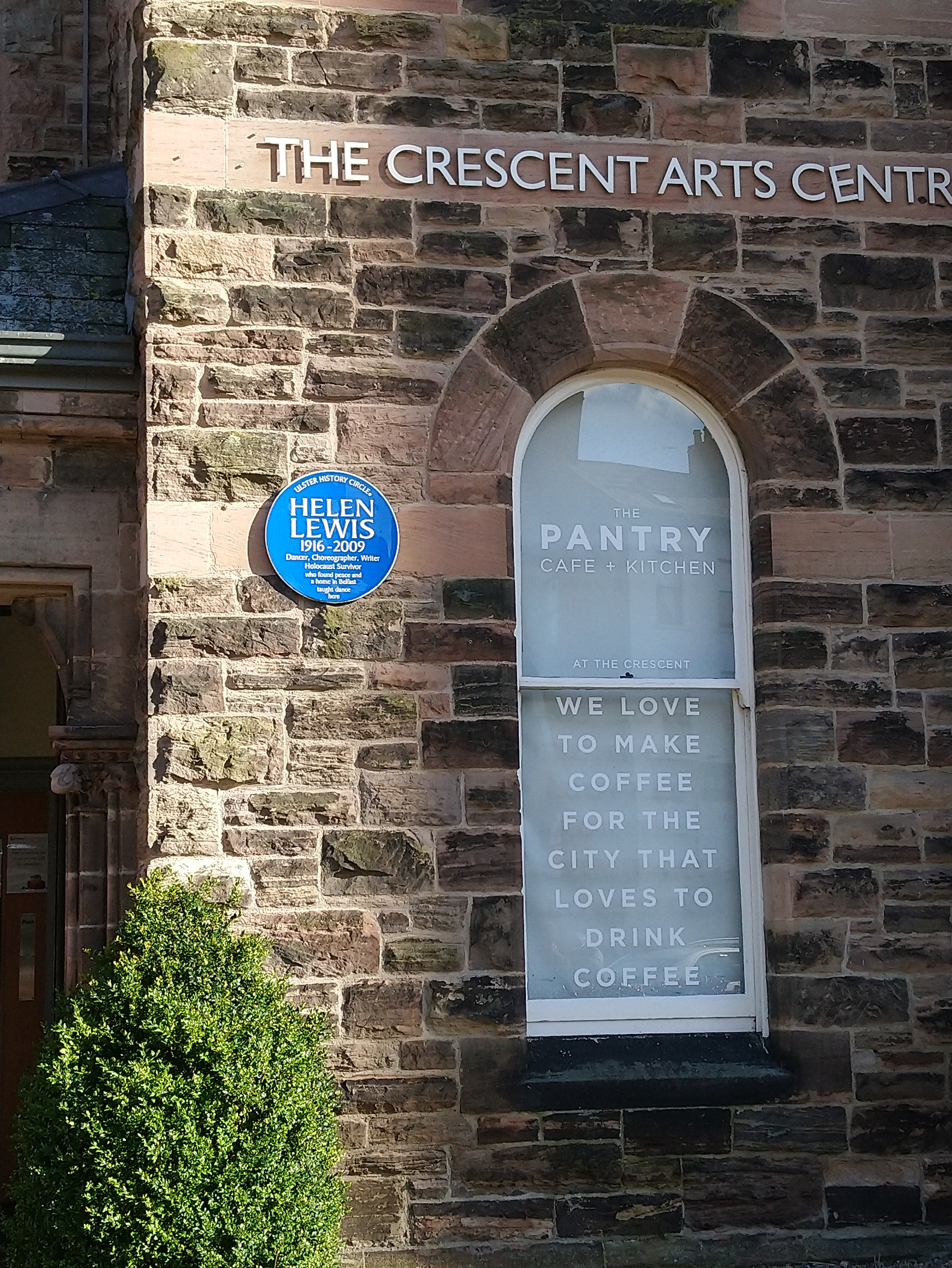
Plaque commemorating Lewis on the Crescent Arts Centre building, Belfast

In October 1947, the Lewises joined Harry's parents in Belfast. From July 1939, Northern Ireland had taken in Jewish children who had arrived in the United Kingdom through the Kindertransport scheme. But entry to the province for Jewish refugees had otherwise been restricted to those few judged to have the capital or skills that would employ local people. However, no barrier had been encountered by Harry's family as his father had been awarded British citizenship for service in the Boer War.

After the birth of her two sons, Michael and Robin, in 1949 and 1954, Helen began to work as a choreographer. In 1956, she created the choreography for the productions The Bartered Bride of Smetana at Grosvenor High School in Belfast, for a performance of Dvořák's The Golden Spinning Wheel at the Belfast Ballet Club, and for a Macbeth at the Lyric Theatre, Belfast. She later became choreographer in residence at the Lyric, where she worked alongside, and became a close friend of, the set designer and artist, Alice Berger Hammerschlag.

In 1962, Helen started the Belfast Modern Dance Group for which she devised and choreographed original ballets. These included the "Dance of Anne Frank’" (1995), which she asked to recreate in Germany. In Northern Ireland, which had known only Irish dance and classical ballet, she introduced an "experimental European style of contemporary dance never before seen". At same time, she did so while collaborating with Irish artists: with composers Raymond Warren, Havelock Nelson, and Alan Tongue, and, in a short ballet based on his poem "A Lough Neagh Sequence", with Nobel Laureate, Seamus Heaney.

During the Northern Ireland Troubles, Helen worked with the Corrymeela Community, and with other peace and reconciliation initiatives, speaking out against bigotry and ethnic cleansing, and bringing theater and dance to schools. For her contributions to contemporary dance, Helen was recognised with honorary doctorates by Queen's University Belfast and by Ulster University, and, in 2001, with her appointment as MBE.

Encouraged by her friends, the writers Michael Longley and Jennifer Johnson, in 1992 she published a memoir, Time to Speak, about her experiences before and during the war, and was translated into several languages, including Czech, and was serialised by the Irish broadcaster RTÉ and the British broadcaster, BBC. A month before her death, a one-woman show adapted from her story by Sam McCready was performed at the Lyric Theatre during the 2009 Belfast International Arts Festival.

Helen Lewis died at her home in Belfast on 31 December 2009, aged 93.

== Commemoration ==
To mark Holocaust Memorial Day 2024, writer and dancer Maddy Tongue presented her book, Helen Lewis: Shadows Behind the Dance at the Linen Hall Library in Belfast. It takes up Helen's story from her arrival in Belfast, and includes a suite of poems in her memory by Michael Longley, also a close friend of Helen, who read from his work.

In 2025, the Northern Ireland War Memorial organised a Holocaust Memorial Day event that included an illustrated online presentation, "Dance Saved My Life",, by her grandson, Dan Lewis.

In 2026, in the dance studio at the Crescent Arts Centre in Belfast that has been named in Helen's honour, funds were raised on Holocaust Memorial for the Helen Lewis Bursaries, a new grants scheme for dance artists in Northern Ireland, in an occasion that included the presentation of a triptych that the artist Sarah Longley had created in response to her late father's poem, "Ghetto".
