= Institute of Musical Research =

Institute of the University of London

- Established: 2005
- Owner: Royal Holloway, University of London
- Address: Senate House, Malet Street
- Location: London, England, United Kingdom
- Website: www.the-imr.uk

The Institute of Musical Research is a research institution associated with the University of London. Formerly a member of the School of Advanced Study, it is since 2015 affiliated to Royal Holloway, University of London. Its focus is the facilitation of research in music of all traditions and eras, and to support freelance and affiliated scholars alike.

Located at Senate House in Bloomsbury, the Institute of Musical Research was established in 2005 and began operation in 2006.

== Notable people ==
- 2006 to 2009: Katharine Ellis; first director
- 2009 to 2011: John Irving
- Current director: Stephen Downes
