= William Jowett =

British missionary

- Born: 1787; Newington, Surrey
- Died: 20 February 1855 (aged 67–68); Clapham, South London
- Education: St John's College, Cambridge
- Spouse: Martha Whiting

Ecclesiastical career
- Church: Church of England
- Writings: Christian Researches in the Mediterranean
- Title: Secretary of the Church Missionary Society

William Jowett (1787 – 20 February 1855) was a missionary and author, in 1813 becoming the first Anglican cleric to volunteer for the overseas service of the Church Missionary Society. A leader of the Evangelicals at Cambridge, he worked in Malta, Ottoman Syria, and Ottoman Palestine, and in later life was clerical secretary of the Society and a parish priest in Clapham, South London.

== Life ==
The son of John Jowett of Newington, Surrey, William Jowett was also a nephew of the jurist Joseph Jowett. His father, John Jowett, was a skinner by trade and an early member of the Church Missionary Society.

Jowett was educated by another uncle, the Reverend Henry Jowett, and then at St John's College, Cambridge, where he matriculated in 1806. He graduated BA (achieving the ranking of twelfth wrangler in the Mathematical Tripos and winning the Hulsean Prize for an essay on the Jews and idolatry) in 1810, then MA in 1813.

Jowett was a Fellow of St John's from 1811 to 1816. John Henry Overton, in The English Church in the Nineteenth Century, says that "The two Jowetts, Joseph Jowett (1752-1813) and his nephew William Jowett (1787-1855), were also leaders of the Evangelicals at Cambridge."

In 1813, Jowett became the first Anglican cleric to step forward for the overseas service of the Church Missionary Society. Between 1815 and 1820 he worked in the Mediterranean region. The Christian Observer noted in May 1816 "The Rev. Wm. Jowett has established himself in Malta", while The Baptist Magazine reported in 1816 under the heading 'Church Missionary Society' that

At Malta, an island in the Mediterranean, the Rev. Wm. Jowett is the Society's representative, and is opening a correspondence wherever he can hear of a good and zealous man, likely to assist him in distributing the scriptures and religious tracts, and in bringing Mahomedans and Heathens to know Christ.

Jowett was based in Malta for most of his first five years in the Mediterranean, but during that period he also lived for a time in Corfu and twice visited Egypt. He returned to England in 1820, with his family, to recover his health.

Considering the peoples and religions of Africa while he was based in Malta, Jowett wrote "Even the geographer, whose task lies merely with the surface of the land and sea, confesses that all he has to show of Africa is but as the hem of a garment!"

In 1818, writing from Malta to the Rev. James Connor in Constantinople, Jowett said: "Religious tracts are too generally dull, because they deal more in abstract truth than in living pictures... It is well, in all our observations of life, to keep some very leading truths in view: they serve as beacons, by the help of which the philosophic mind shapes its course."

Later, from 1823 to 1824, Jowett worked for the Society in Ottoman Syria and Ottoman Palestine. Towards the end of 1823, he visited Jerusalem.

From 1832 to 1841, Jowett was clerical secretary of the CMS and was also lecturer at St Mary Aldermanbury and St Peter upon Cornhill, both in the City of London, and at Holy Trinity, Clapham. Eugene Stock, writing The History of the Church Missionary Society at the end of the 19th century, described Jowett in his role as clerical secretary of the Society as "faithful and tender-spirited" and over-shadowed by the Society's Lay Secretary, Dandeson Coates.

Jowett retired from his position with the Church Missionary Society in July 1841 on the grounds of ill health, and the Society's Committee resolved as follows:

That the Committee, deeply sympathizing with the Rev. William Jowett on the failure of his strength, which they believe to be mainly attributable to his exhausting labours in the Mediterranean Mission, receive with heartfelt and unfeigned regret his resignation of the office of Secretary of the Church Missionary Society — that, while the Committee would ascribe all the praise to the Grace of God our Saviour, they desire to record their grateful sense of Mr. Jowett's long-tried, self-denying, and holy services; which abroad, under the Divine Blessing resting upon his Researches in the Mediterranean, laid the foundation of the Egyptian, Greek, and Abyssinian Missions; and at home have left a succession of Instructions, and a series of many hundreds Letters, addressed to the various Missionaries of the Society, as lasting memorials of his Missionary Experience, his Spiritual Wisdom, and his Christian Love — and that the Committee further assure him, that they entertain toward him the liveliest sentiments of respect and affection, and will follow him, in his retirement to less onerous duties, with their earnest prayers that God, in His infinite mercy, may still continue to bless and make him a blessing to others.

A Māori chief of the Ngāti Paoa of Waiheke Island, New Zealand, was baptized 'William Jowett' in honour of Jowett, and in Māori usage this name became 'Wiremu Howete'.

In 1851, Jowett gained the benefice of St John's, Clapham Rise, and he died at Clapham in 1855.

== The first Amharic Bible ==
Jowett gives an account of the creation of the first Amharic Bible, in which he himself played a part. In about 1809, the French consul at Cairo, M. Asselin de Cherville, met an elderly Abyssinian named Abu Rumi, who had been both interpreter to the traveller James Bruce in North Africa and an instructor to the philologist Sir William Jones. Asselin wished to have some important book translated into Amharic, the vernacular language of Abyssinia, as a linguistic exercise, and employed Abu Rumi to translate the Bible. Asselin remarked, however, "I blushed while I offered a salary to a man the most simple, the most virtuous, and the most disinterested, that I ever met with." In 1819, after he had finished the whole translation, Abu Rumi died of the plague at Cairo. In 1820, while on a visit to Cairo, Jowett saw this work in manuscript, entered into negotiations with Asselin, and on 10 April 1820 bought it for the British and Foreign Bible Society "on terms which appeared to... be equitable to all parties". The manuscript consisted of 9,539 pages "...in the hand-writing of the Translator, Abu Rumi; which is a bold and fine specimen of the Amharic character". Jowett wrote in 1822:

The publication of the Amharic Scriptures will be as the lighting of a Pharos on the inhospitable shores of the Red Sea!... This remarkable work, therefore, British Christians may well accept as a gift in Trust for Abyssinia.

This was the first ever complete translation of the Bible into Amharic, and the Bible Society produced an edition by Thomas Pell Platt and circulated thousands of copies in Abyssinia, where it caused a sensation. The Amharic Bible of Abu Rumi was later revised for the Bible Society by Johann Ludwig Krapf, a German missionary. The Abu Rumi Bible was the principal translation of the Bible in Amharic until the Emperor Haile Selassie ordered a new translation which appeared in 1960-61.

== Wife and children ==
In 1815, Jowett had married Martha, a daughter of John Whiting of Little Palgrave, Norfolk, and they had seven children together, but his wife died long before him, in 1829. She had worked as a missionary alongside her husband, and according to Emma Raymond Pitman's Heroines of the Mission Field (1880), "Miss Martha Whiting in her youth received a superior education, and evinced not only a zeal for the acquisition of knowledge, but an aptitude for acquiring languages". A number of her letters survive. A memorial inscription to Martha Jowett at St Mary's, Lewisham, reads "In memory of Martha, the beloved wife of the Rev. William Jowett M.A., She was eleven years resident as a missionary in Malta, born Oct. 22, 1789, died June 24, 1829. Who shall separate us from the love of Christ?"

== Publications ==
In 1822 Jowett published a work on the Mediterranean, Christian Researches, and in 1825 other work on Syria and Palestine. Among his many other works, a memoir of the Rev. Cornelius Neale ran into two editions.

- Christian researches in the Mediterranean, from MDCCCXV to MDCCCXX in the furtherance of the objects of the Church Missionary Society, with an appendix containing the Journal of the Rev. James Connor, chiefly in Syria and Palestine (London: L. B. Seeley and J. Hatchard, for the Church Missionary Society, 1822)
- Christian Researches in Syria and the Holy Land in MDCCCXXIII and MDCCCXXIV, in Furtherance of the Objects of the Church Missionary Society: with an Appendix Containing the Journal of Mr. Joseph Greaves on a Visit to the Regency of Tunis (London: L. B. Seeley and J. Hatchard, 1825)
- A Memoir of the Rev. W. A. B. Johnson, Missionary of the Church Missionary Society in Regent's Town, Sierra Leone, A.D. 1816-1823, Compiled from his Journals, etc., by R. B. Seeley, with some prefatory remarks by the Rev. William Jowett, M. A. (London: 1832, 430pp)
- Memoir of the Rev. Cornelius Neale, M. A., to which are added his Remains; being Sermons, Allegories & Various Compositions in Prose and Verse (London: Seeley & Burnside, 2nd edition, 1835)
- The Christian visitor; or, Select portions of the Old Testament, Genesis to Job; with expositions and prayers, designed to assist the friends of the sick and afflicted (London: R. B. Seeley & W. Burnside, 1836) and three other volumes on Psalms to Malachi, the Four Gospels, and the Acts of the Apostles & the Epistles.
- Helps to Pastoral Visitation: illustrating the Spiritual Intercourse of a Minister with his Flock (London: Seeley, Burnside & Seeley, 1844, 342pp)
- Scripture Characters: First Series: Adam to Abraham B.C. 4004—1822 (London: Seeley, Burnside & Seeley, 1847)
- Family Prayers for Five Weeks (London: Seeley, Jackson & Halliday, 1855)

Seventy-eight letters written by Jowett from Malta and England between 1816 and 1836 are held in the British and Foreign Bible Society's Archives.

J. H. Overton notes "Henry Blunt, Josiah Pratt, William Jowett, Basil Woodd, in fact, almost all the leaders of the Evangelical party, were writers of devotional works which have shared the inevitable fate of the vast majority of such works, and, having served their purpose in their day, passed into oblivion."
