= Abu Rumi =

Translator for the first complete Bible in Amharic

Abu Rumi (about 1750– 1818) is the name recorded as being the translator for the first complete Bible in Amharic, the national language of Ethiopia. Previously, only partial Amharic translations existed, and the Ethiopian Bible existed only in Ge'ez, the ancient liturgical language of Ethiopia. His story is recorded by William Jowett (1824). He was educated in the Ethiopian Orthodox Church, but it is not clear if he was a monk, priest, or had any official status within the church.

According to Jowett, Abu Rumi served as a translator for the Scots explorer James Bruce at the age of 22. Abu Rumi left Ethiopia in his 28th year, visited Cairo, Jerusalem, Syria and India, where he resided in the house of Sir William Jones. "We are not told what he is supposed to have taught that great orientalist," writes Edward Ullendorff, "but presumably it was a smattering of Ge'ez and Amharic poetry" (Ullendorff, 1968: 66).

While travelling through Cairo, at which time his age is estimated at "about fifty or fifty-five years of age" (Jowett, 1824:201), Abu Rumi became very ill and was taken in by M. Jean-Louis Asselin de Cherville (1772–1822), the French Consul in Cairo. He provided Abu Rumi with food, lodging, and medical care. But more significantly, he also provided him with writing materials. Over a period of 10 years, Abu Rumi produced a complete translation of the Bible in Amharic. He then made one more journey to Jerusalem; Abu Rumi died of the plague in Cairo.

The manuscript containing his translation was eventually purchased by William Jowett on behalf of the British and Foreign Bible Society. He took it back to Britain where it was typeset and printed. These printed copies were sent back to Ethiopia. There were a number of editions made of Abu Rumi's original translation, different editors making some changes, but the original work is his. A copy of Abu Rumi's translation of the Bible in Amharic was eventually found in a monastery in the early 1860s and launched a church renewal movement that eventually led to the founding of the Ethiopian Evangelical Church Mekane Yesus (Aren 1978:14, 15, 104).

Since then, there have been other translations of the whole Bible in Amharic, mostly by the Ethiopian Bible Society, but his is the first. According to Ullendorff, "Abu Rumi's version, with some changes and amendments, held sway until the Emperor Haile Sellassie I ordered a new translation of the entire Bible which appeared in 1960/1." (Ullendorff 1968: 66).

== Sources ==
- Arén, Gustav. 1978. Evangelical Pioneers in Ethiopia. Stockholm: Stockholm: EFS Forlaget.
- Jowett, William. 1824. Christian Researches in the Mediterranean from MDCCCXV to MDCCCXX in Furtherance of the Objects of the Church Missionary Society. London.
- Fellman, Jack. 1977. The first Amharic Bible translation. The Bible Translator 28: pp. 154–155.
- Kleiner, Michael. 2003. "Abu Rumi". Encyclopaedia Aethiopica, vol. 1, edited by Siegbert Uhlig, pp. 53, 54. Wiesbaden: Harrassowitz.
- Ullendorff, Edward. 1968. Ethiopia and the Bible. Oxford: The British Academy.
