= Thomas Attwood Walmisley =

English composer and organist (1814–1856)

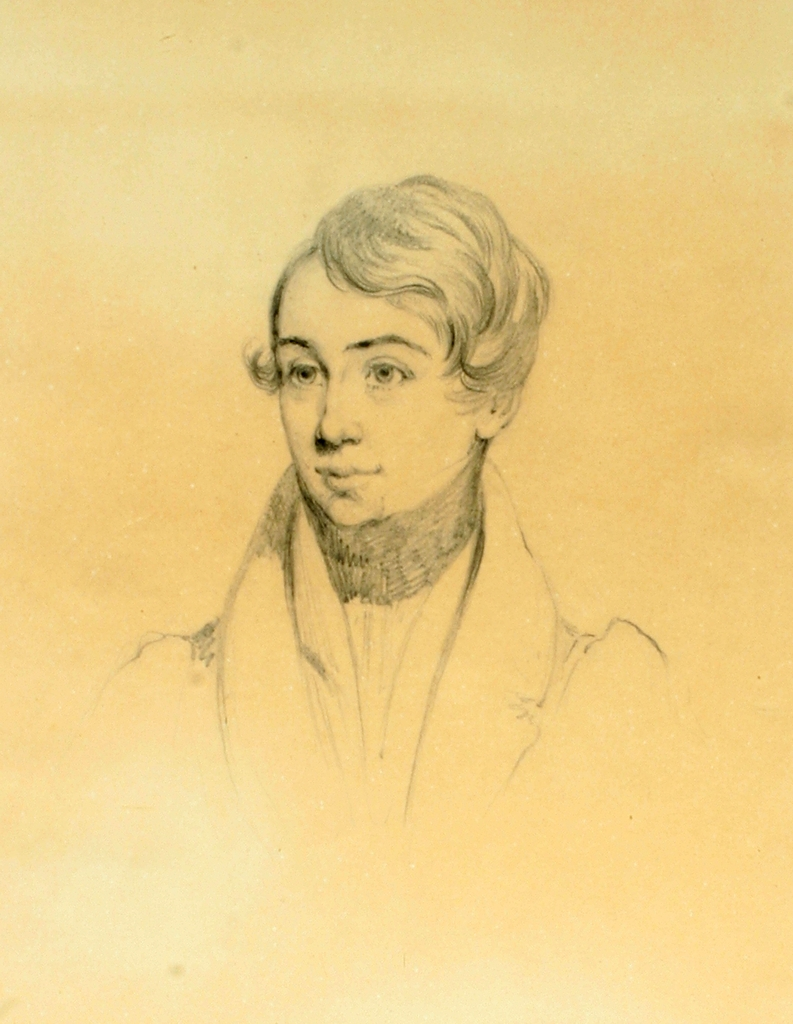

Background information
- Born: 21 January 1814; London, England
- Origin: England
- Died: 17 January 1856 (aged 41) Fairlight, East Sussex, England
- Genres: Classical
- Occupation: Composer
- Instrument: Organ

Thomas Attwood Walmisley (21 January 1814 – 17 January 1856) was an English composer and organist.

== Life and career ==
He was born in London, the son of Thomas Forbes Gerrard Walmisley (1783–1866), a well-known organist and composer of church music and glees. Mozart’s former pupil Thomas Attwood was his godfather, and the boy was educated in music under their tuition.

Walmisley was organist of Croydon Parish Church in 1830 before becoming organist at Trinity College, Cambridge in 1833. There, he soon became prominent through his anthems and other compositions. He was simultaneously the organist for the Choir of St John's College, Cambridge. He not only earned the degrees of Mus.Bac. and Mus.Doc. but also graduated from Jesus College as BA and MA.

In 1836, Walmisley was made Professor of Music at Cambridge. His Cathedral Music was edited after his death by his father.

Walmisley died in 1856 and is buried in the churchyard of St Andrew's Church, Fairlight, East Sussex.

== Compositions ==
Walmisley is remembered chiefly for his Magnificat and Nunc dimittis in D minor, which hold a significant place in the Anglican choral repertoire. He also composed numerous Anglican chants that are still in general use.

== Notes ==
Academic offices
Preceded by Samuel Matthews	Director of Music, Trinity College, Cambridge; 1833–1856	Succeeded by John Larkin Hopkins
