= Jim Samson =

British musicologist and academic (born 1946)

Thomas James Samson, FBA (born 6 July 1946), commonly known as Jim Samson, is a musicologist and retired academic. Described as "a leading authority on the music of Chopin", his research extends to Romantic music, early 20th-century classical music and the music of east Central Europe in general.

== Life and career ==
Thomas James Samson was born on 6 July 1946 in Carnlough in Northern Ireland. Educated at Queen's University Belfast (BMus) and studied with Arnold Whittall at the University College, Cardiff (MMus, PhD).

Samson was appointed to a research fellowship at the University of Leicester in 1972. He moved to the University of Exeter in 1973 as a lecturer; promotions followed, to reader in 1987 and Professor of Musicology in 1992. In 1994, he was appointed Stanley Hugh Badock Professor of Music at the University of Bristol, and was then Professor of Music at Royal Holloway, University of London, between 2002 and 2011.

== Honours and awards ==
Samson was awarded the Order of Merit by the Polish government in 1990 and was elected a Fellow of the British Academy, the United Kingdom's national academy, in 2000. In 2018, he received the IRC Harrison Medal from the Society for Musicology in Ireland.

== Selected publications ==
- Music in Transition: A Study of the Tonal Expansion and Early Atonality, 1900–1920 (Dent, 1977; reprinted in 1993).
- The Music of Szymanowski (Kahn and Averill, 1980).
- The Music of Chopin (Routledge and Kegan Paul, 1985; reprinted by Clarendon Press, 1994).
- Chopin: The Four Ballades (Cambridge University Press, 1992).
- (Editor) The Cambridge Companion to Chopin (Cambridge University Press, 1992).
- Chopin (Oxford University Press, 1996).
- (Editor) The Cambridge History of Nineteenth-Century Music (Cambridge University Press, 2002).
- Virtuosity and the Musical Work: the Transcendental Studies of Liszt (Cambridge University Press, 2003).
- (Edited with J. P. E. Harper-Scott) Introduction to Music Studies (Cambridge University Press, 2008).
- Music in the Balkans (Brill, 2013).
- (Edited with Nicoletta Demetriou) Music in Cyprus (Routledge, 2015).

Academic offices
Preceded by Raymond Warren	Stanley Hugh Badock Professor of Music, University of Bristol; 1994–2002	Succeeded by Stephen Banfield
