= W. K. Stanton =

English composer (1891–1978)

Walter Kendall Stanton (29 September 1891, Dauntsey, Wiltshire – 30 June 1978, Sedgehill, Wiltshire) was an English organist, educationalist, and composer of sacred music.

W.K. Stanton was educated at Choristers' School, Salisbury Cathedral before undertaking an organ scholarship at Lancing College, Sussex. He then went to Merton College, Oxford (1909–1913) where he was an organ scholar and was awarded M.A., B.Mus. He proceeded to Mus.D. in 1935. Stanton taught at St John's School, Leatherhead, Surrey (1914–1915), St Edward's School, Oxford (1915–1924), and Wellington College, Berkshire (1924–1937). During World War 1 years he raised money for wounded soldiers by giving organ recitals. Stanton became Director of Music at Reading University (1927–1937) and then Director of Music for the Midland Region of the BBC (1937–1945). He was the first Professor of Music at Bristol University (1947–1958). Later he was Conductor of the Bristol Choral Society and City Organist for Bristol. He served on several examining boards and was active in a number of musical societies. Stanton was known affectionately to students and colleagues as 'WK'. He was a railway enthusiast and a keen philatelist.

Stanton composed mostly choral music, including almost 50 hymn tunes and numerous choral anthems, several of which have become standard church choir fare. Two motets for double choir (Sing We Triumphant Hymns of Praise and The Spacious Firmament on High) are considered notable. He also compiled the Wellington College Hymn Book, was Editor-In-Chief of the BBC Hymn Book, and provided the commentary for Sixty Years of Cathedral Music 1898–1958.

Stanton's father was a schoolmaster and he had a younger brother, Cyril, who was a Special Telegraphist during World War 1 and a self-taught pianist. He married Edith Monica Leslie Wood, known as Monica (13 October 1896 – 8 May 1956), a violinist, in 1931. There were no children.

Academic offices
Preceded by Office created.	Stanley Hugh Badock Professor of Music, University of Bristol; 1947–1958	Succeeded by Willis Grant
