= Harriet Hague =

English pianist and composer

Harriet Hague (1793–1816) was an English pianist and composer.

Hague was the daughter of the violinist Charles Hague. She composed six songs, which were collected in the 1814 publication Six songs: with an accompaniment for the piano forte. Robert René Meyer-Sée said in his book Masquerier and his circle that her "1816 death unfortunately cut short what might have been a brilliant career". A review of one of Hague's compositions in the 1804 publication Monthly Magazine and British Register, Volume 18 states, "This infantile production (for the ages of the poetess and musician, added together, we are told, amount but to twenty-two years) greatly exceeds what we should have expected from two such young authoresses".

Hague died at Bury St Edmunds on 6 February 1816, a notice of her death published in The Morning Post (London) referred to her as "the amiable and accomplished daughter of Professor Hague, Cambridge".
