= Charles Hague =

English violinist and composer

Charles Hague (4 May 1769 – 18 June 1821) was an English violinist and composer, who became professor of music at Cambridge University.

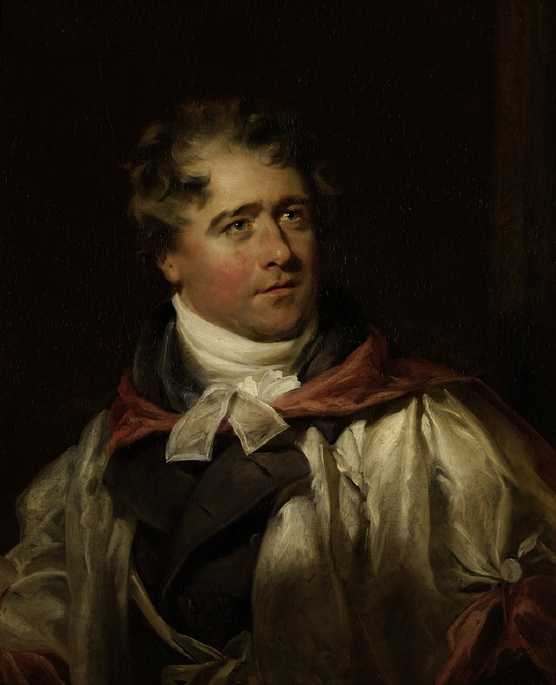
Charles Hague

== Life ==
Hague was born at Tadcaster, Yorkshire, and was taught music and the violin by his elder brother, William. In 1779 he moved with his brother to Cambridge, where he studied the violin under Antony Manini, and thorough-bass and composition under Hellendaal the Elder. He acquired a reputation as a violin player, which led to a friendship with Joseph Jowett, then regius professor of civil law. Manini died in 1785, and Hague moved to London and studied under Johann Peter Salomon and Benjamin Cooke. On his return to Cambridge he took pupils, among whom was William Crotch, and in 1794 as a member of Trinity Hall, Cambridge proceeded Mus.B. In 1799 he succeeded John Randall as professor of music, and in 1801 proceeded Mus.D.

In 1791 he married Harriet, daughter of J. Hussey, Esq. of Clapton and they settled in Cambridge. They had two children. His eldest daughter, Harriet Hague, an accomplished pianist, who published in 1814 Six Songs, with an Accompaniment for the Pianoforte, died in 1816, aged 23.

Hague died in Cambridge 18 June 1821.

== Works ==
Hague's main works were:

- By the Waters of Babylon. An Anthem composed for the Degree of Bachelor of Music, and performed 29 June 1794.
- Glees.
- Twelve Symphonies by Haydn, arranged as Quintets.
- The Ode as performed in the Senate-house at Cambridge at the Installation of his Royal Highness the Duke of Gloucester, Chancellor of the University. This ode was written by William Smyth, professor of history.

Hague also assisted James Plumptre, fellow of Clare College, Cambridge, in the publication of A Collection of Songs, 1805.
