= Raymond Warren =

British composer and teacher (1928–2025)

- Raymond Warren, c. 2000
- Born: 7 November 1928; Axbridge, Somerset, England
- Died: 4 June 2025 (aged 96)
- Education: University of Cambridge
- Occupations: Composer; Academic teacher
- Organizations: Queen's University Belfast; University of Bristol

Raymond Henry Charles Warren (7 November 1928 – 4 June 2025) was a British composer and university teacher.

Warren studied at Cambridge, and taught at Queen's University Belfast, where he was the first person in the UK to be given a personal chair in composition in 1966, before becoming Hamilton Harty Professor of Music in 1969. He was Stanley Hugh Badock Professor of Music at the University of Bristol from 1972 until his retirement in 1994.

His works include a choral Passion, a Violin Concerto, three Symphonies, a Requiem, the oratorio Continuing Cities, six operas and an extensive amount of music for children, young people and community music making.

== Biography ==
Raymond Warren was born in Axbridge, Somerset on 7 November 1928. His mother was Gwendoline C. Warren, née Hallett. Warren studied at Bancroft's School and Corpus Christi College, Cambridge (1949–52), reading mathematics at first and then changing to music under Boris Ord and Robin Orr. Later he studied privately with Michael Tippett (1952–60), Lennox Berkeley (1958) and Benjamin Britten (1961). From 1955 to 1972 he taught at Queen's University, Belfast, where from 1966 he held a personal Chair in composition. While in Belfast, an association with the Lyric Players theatre company involved writing music for many of the plays of W. B. Yeats.

For the years 1966–72 he was Resident Composer to the Ulster Orchestra, writing for them a number of orchestral works and also conducting the Orchestra in a series of Sunday afternoon concerts of contemporary music. In 1972 he was appointed Professor of Music at the University of Bristol, a post from which he retired in 1994. Following retirement he composed to commission for a wide variety of performers notably the Brunel Ensemble (Symphony No.3, In My Childhood) and the London Children's Ballet (Ballet Shoes, 2001).

He collaborated with many other artists of note including the poets John Reed, Seamus Heaney, Michael Longley and Charles Tomlinson, the choreographer Helen Lewis and the founders of the Lyric Theatre, Belfast, and wrote for performers including Peter Pears, Julian Bream, Eric Gruenberg, Cecil Aronowitz, Janet Price, Christopher Austin, Jeremy Huw Williams, David Ogden and the Dartington String Quartet.

As a teacher, Warren's students included a number of composers and musicians who have gone on to have significant careers including: Christopher Austin, Eibhlis Farrell, Philip Hammond, David Byers and Will Todd.

Warren died on 4 June 2025, at the age of 96.

== Music ==
Major works include the oratorio The Passion (1962), Symphony No.1 (1964), the Violin Concerto (1966), Songs of Old Age (1968), Symphony No.2 (1969), the oratorio Continuing Cities (1989), Symphony No.3 (1995), In My Childhood (1998) and Cello Requiem (2018) as well as his six operas.

Four of the operas were written for children. Two of them, Let My People Go and St. Patrick, were commissioned by the Liverpool Education Authority and first performed by the Liverpool Schools Symphony Orchestra. Aside from the operas, works for children and young people include Songs of Unity (1968) written for Methodist College, Belfast and several pieces written for youth orchestras including Ring of Light (2005), A Star Danced (2009) and Variations on a Gloucester Chime (2012).

Chamber music includes two Piano sonatas, a Violin sonata, three String quartets and the Piano trio Burnt Norton Sketches (1985), which were later orchestrated by Christopher Austin (1999). Peter Jacobs has recorded the Monody movement from Warren's Second Piano Sonata (1977), which consists of a single line of melody with decoration. Song cycles include Spring 1948 (1956), The Pity of Love (1966), Songs of Old Age (1968), the orchestral song cycle In My Childhood (1998), Another Spring (2008) and The Coming (2010).

His shorter choral works include the cantata The Death of Orpheus (1953 revised 2009), the motet Salvator Mundi (1976), The Starlight Night (1990), the evening canticles written for Bristol Cathedral: The Bristol Service (1991) and Celtic Blessings (1996). Music for dance includes two notable collaborations with Helen Lewis, There is a Time (1970) and the London Children's Ballet, Ballet Shoes (2001).

Warren worked closely with several poets, providing instrumental music to complement spoken words, including Lares (1972) with Michael Longley and The Sound of Time (1984) with Charles Tomlinson. The first of these was with his contemporary Seamus Heaney, A Lough Neagh Sequence (1970). Warren wrote:

"I knew Seamus Heaney quite well – we were both young lecturers at the Queen’s University of Belfast – and I thought of him then, before his coming to international fame, as essentially a deep-rooted Irish country poet. He didn’t want his poetry to lose its own “music” by being sung, and I was happy with this because, as an outsider to his tradition I felt I could not readily penetrate it with my music so closely. Hence the decision not to set his sequence as song but instead to have the poems read and to bring out their almost ritualistic long term structures with the use of overlaid piano interludes."

Heaney made a recording of this version of his poetry with Warren's music in 2011.

Many of his shorter works are among his most powerful including the solo cantata for flute, piano and mezzo soprano, Drop, Drop Slow Tears (1960) and the Song for St. Cecilia’s Day (1967) scored for tenor, flute, viola, guitar and first performed by Peter Pears, Richard Adeney, Cecil Aronowitz and Julian Bream. His best selling work as a recording is the orchestral suite Wexford Bells (1970).

== Selected works ==
(Impulse Music has a complete list)

Opera
- The Lady of Ephesus (1959)
- Finn and the Black Hag (1959)
- Graduation Ode (1963)
- Let My People Go (1972)
- St. Patrick (1979)
- In the Beginning (1982)

Oratorios

- The Passion (1962)
- Songs of Unity (1968)
- Continuing Cities (1989)
- St. John Passion (Were You There?) (1999)

Orchestral

- Overture to a Comedy for strings (1953)
- Nocturne for orchestra (1964)
- Symphony No. 1 (1965)
- Violin Concerto (1966)
- Processions, concert overture (1967)
- Seaside Sketches, suite for orchestra (1968)
- Symphony No. 2 (1969)
- Wexford Bells, suite for orchestra (1970)
- Bridgwater Fair, overture (1980)
- Symphony No. 3 Pictures with Angels (1995)
- Ring of Light for marimba, percussion, organ and strings (2005)
- A Star Danced for cello and orchestra (2009)
- Variations on a Gloucester Chime (2012)
- Gwent Carnival (2013)

Ballet

- There is a Time, choir and dancers (1970)
- Ballet Shoes, children's ballet (2001, rev. 2010)

Chamber

- String Trio (1956)
- Quartet Blues (homage á Chris Barber), string quartet (1958)
- Sonata for cello and harpsichord (or piano) (1962)
- Music for Harlequin, wind serenade (1964)
- String Quartet No. 1 (1965)
- Triptych for solo violin (1971)
- Duo Concertante, cello and piano (1972)
- String Quartet No. 2 The Bells (1975)
- String Quartet No. 3 (1977)
- Burnt Norton Sketches, piano trio (1985)
- Sonata for violin and piano (1993)
- Picasso Pictures, wind quintet (2003)
- Introduction and Allegro, viola and piano (2012)

Piano

- Ten Variations on a theme of Purcell (1947)
- Sonata No. 1 (1952)
- Canonic Variations on a Spiritual (1960)
- Five Bagatelles (1967)
- A Pavane for these Sad and Distracted Times (1972)
- Sonata No. 2 (1977)
- Erinnerungen (2002)
- 9 Variations on a theme by Janacek, piano duet (2010)
- Four Hardy Portraits (2014)

Organ

- Three Christmas Preludes (1956)
- A Little Organ Mass (1980)
- Grecian Dialogues (2008)

Cantatas

- What Bird so Sings (1952)
- Death of Orpheus, a cappella (1953)
- The Annunciation (1955)
- The Strife is O'er: an Easter Cantata (1960)
- Sea Change, children's choir (1961)
- Song for St. Cecilia’s Day (1967)
- Leave us not Comfortless (1977)
- Canciones de Agua (1999)
- Of Brooks and Blossoms, eight Herrick poems (2004)

Songs and choral

- Spring 1948, five Paul Dehn settings (1956)
- Four Irish Madrigals a cappella Yeats settings (1959)
- The Pity of Love, six Yeats settings (1966)
- Songs of Old Age, eight Yeats settings (1968)
- A Lough Neagh Sequence, Seamus Heaney, speaker and piano (1970)
- Lares six poems by Michael Longley, speaker, clarinet, bassoon (1972)
- Madrigals in Time of War, a cappella (1974)
- The Sound of Time, six poems by Charles Tomlinson, speaker and piano (1984)
- The Starlight Night, a cappella (1990)
- Celtic Blessings, a cappella (1996)
- In My Childhood, five MacNeice settings (1998)
- Another Spring five Christina Rossetti songs (2008)
- The Coming, three songs (2010)
- Dancing in the Wind, Four Childhood Pictures (2013)

Church music

- Magnificat and Nunc Dimittis (1958)
- Salvator Mundi, a cappella 1976
- Two Beatitudes (1976)
- Bristol Service (1991)
- Psalm 100 (1993)
- Ave Verum (2001)
- St. Paul ’s Service (2001)
- Missa Brevis, a cappella (2003)
- Spiritus Domini (2007)
- Cello Requiem (2017)

Theatre Music

- Music for 11 Yeats plays at the Lyric Players Theatre, Belfast (1959-70)
- The complete ‘Cuchulain’ cycle of four plays, Lyric Players Theatre Belfast (1968)

== Discography ==
- Bristol Service, Bristol Cathedral Choir, Priory PRCD 528
- In My Childhood, A Lough Neagh Sequence, Piano Sonata No 2, on 'The Next Ocean'. Raymond Warren and Seamus Heaney (reader), Philip Mead (piano), Olivia Robinson (soloist), University of Hertfordshire Chamber Orchestra conducted by Robin Browning. UH Recordings (2011)
- Golden Rings, Magnificat and Nunc Dimittis and Salvator Mundi (Bristol Graduate Singers conducted by Edward Davies)
- Symphony No 3, Pictures with Angels. The Brunel Ensemble conducted by Christopher Austin (1996)
- Monody; Chaconne. Peter Jacobs (piano). Severnside Composers' Alliance Inaugural Piano Recital. Dunelm Records (2005)
- Wexford Bells, Royal Ballet Sinfonia, Gavin Sutherland, on 'British Light Music Discoveries', ASV CD WHL 2126 (2000)

== Publications ==
- Warren, Raymond: Opera Workshops: Studies in Understanding and Interpretation (Brookfield, 1995)
- Warren, Raymond: The Composer and Opera Performance in Thomas, W. (ed.), Composition – Performance – Reception: Studies in the Creative Process in Music, Ashgate, 1998, ISBN 1-85928-325-X
- Davies, Edward. Raymond Warren: A Study of His Music. Work in preparation.

Academic offices
Preceded by Willis Grant	Stanley Hugh Badock Professor of Music, University of Bristol; 1972–1994	Succeeded by Jim Samson
