= Thomas Tunnard =

English cathedral organist (1918–2012)

- Born: 1918 July 30th
- Died: 2012 August 25th

Thomas Tunnard (30 July 1918 – 25 August 2012) was an English cathedral organist, who served in St. Philip's Cathedral, Birmingham.

== Background ==
Thomas (known as 'Tim') Newburgh Tunnard was born on 30 July 1918 in Lexham, Norfolk, to Thomas Monkton Tunnard and Grace Cook. He was a chorister at St. George's Chapel, Windsor Castle, and then educated at Bedford School, the Royal College of Music and New College, Oxford 1937 - 1939, and 1945 - 1946.

From 1950 he was head of music at Warwick School.

In 1953 he founded the Warwick & Kenilworth Choral Society.

From 1958 he was head of music at King Edward's School, Birmingham, following in the footsteps of his predecessor Willis Grant at the Cathedral. In 1979 he was in charge of the choir of York Minster for a term while the resident Director of Music, Francis Jackson (composer) was on sabbatical.

Died 25 August 2012

== Career ==
Organist of:

- St Michael at the North Gate, Oxford 1946 - 1950
- Collegiate Church of St Mary, Warwick 1950 - 1958
- St. Philip's Cathedral, Birmingham 1958 - 1967

Cultural offices
Preceded by Peter Burton	Organist and Master of the Choristers of Collegiate Church of St Mary, Warwick; 1950-1958	Succeeded by Douglas Clarke
Preceded by Willis Grant	Organist and Master of the Choristers of Birmingham Cathedral; 1958-1967	Succeeded by Roy Massey
