= John Clarke Whitfield =

English organist and composer (1770–1836)

John Clarke-Whitfeld
- Born: December 13, 1770; Gloucester, England
- Died: February 22, 1836 (aged 65) Hereford, England
- Genres: Classical
- Occupation: Composer
- Instrument: Organ
- Spouse: Susannah Grainger (m. 1789)

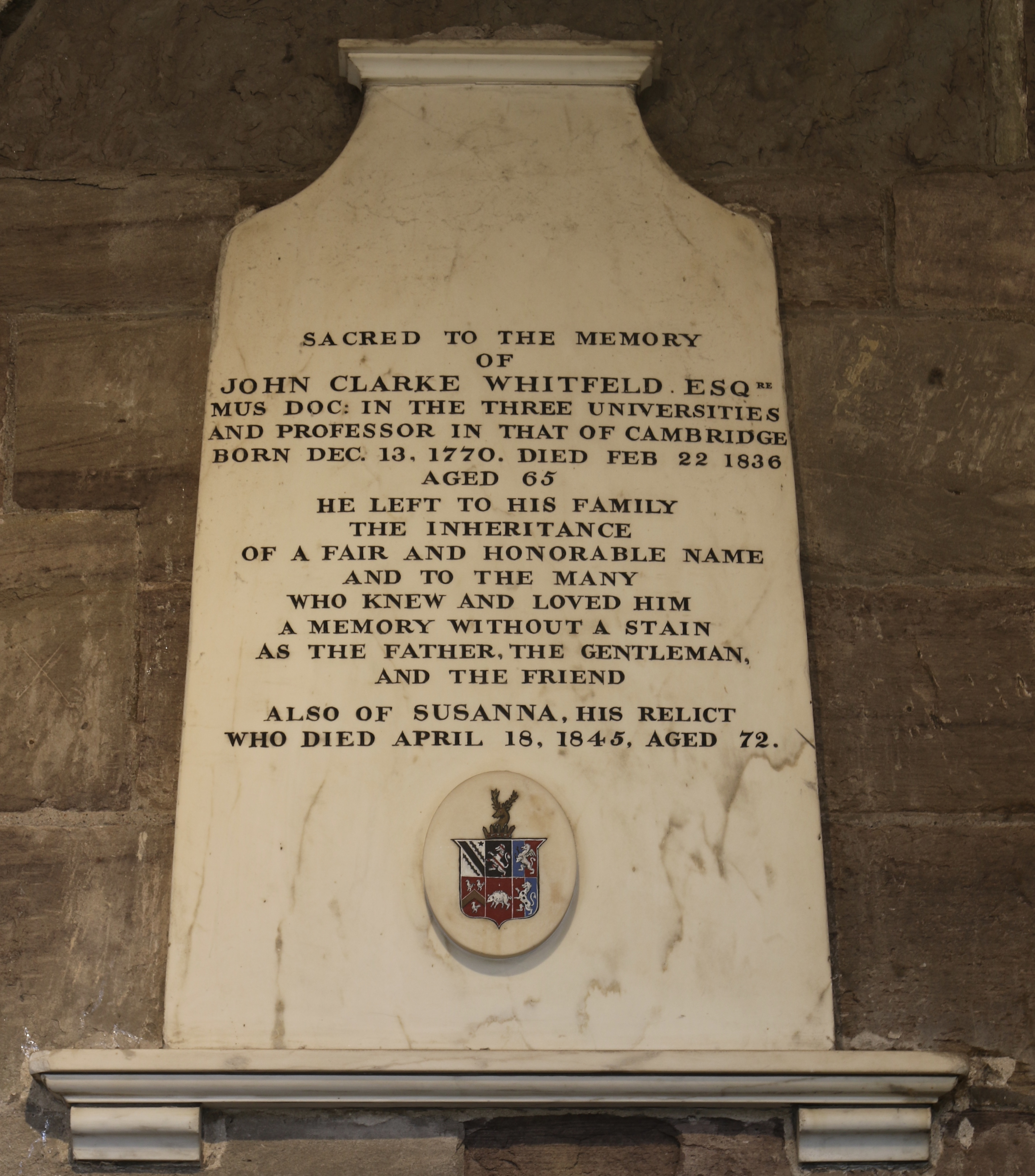
Memorial in the cloister of Hereford Cathedral

John Clarke-Whitfeld (13 December 1770 – 22 February 1836) was an English organist and composer.

== Life ==
He was born John Clarke at Gloucester, and educated at Oxford under Dr Philip Hayes.

In 1789 he was appointed organist of the parish church at Ludlow. Four years later he took the degree of Mus. Bac. at Cambridge, and in 1795 he was chosen as organist of Armagh cathedral, whence he removed in the same year to Dublin, with the appointments of organist and master of the children at St Patrick's Cathedral and Christchurch.

Driven from Ireland by the rebellion of 1798, he accepted the post of organist at Trinity and St John's Colleges, Cambridge. He took the degree of Mus. Doc. at Cambridge in 1799, and in 1810 proceeded to the same grade at Oxford. In 1814 he assumed the surname of Whitfeld, in addition to that of Clarke, in anticipation of an inheritance which failed to materialise.

Press cutting - Bury & Norwich Post 1 June 1814 - Tuesdays Gazette: John Clarke, of Emanuel House, Cambridge, Dr. in music, only son and heir of John Clarke, late of Malmesbury, Wilts, Gent, by Amphillis his wife, (who was at length the only surviving child of Henry Fotherly Whitfeld, of Rickmansworth Park, deceased) has his Majesty's licence and authority to take and use the surname and arms of Whitfeld only.

In 1820 he was elected organist and master of the choristers at Hereford Cathedral; and on the death of Dr Charles Hague he was appointed Professor of Music at Cambridge. Three years afterwards he resigned these appointments in consequence of an attack of paralysis. He died at Hereford, on 22 February 1836 aged 65.

Whitfeld's compositions were very numerous. Among the best of them are four volumes of anthems, the first three published in 1805, and the fourth soon after his appointment at Hereford Cathedral. He also composed a great number of songs, one of which--"Bird of the Wilderness," written to some well-known verses by James Hogg, the "Ettrick Shepherd"—attained a high degree of popularity but the great work of his life was the publication, in a popular and eminently useful form, of the oratorios of Handel, which he was the first to present to the public with a complete pianoforte accompaniment.

== Family ==
On 3 September 1789 John Clarke married Susannah Grainger (born 1768) in Worcester. Their son Henry John Whitfeld (1808–1855) became an alumnus of Downing College, Cambridge and the vicar of Granborough, Buckinghamshire. Henry J. Whitfeld was the author of Scilly and its Legends (1852) and Rambles in Devonshire (1854).

== Notes ==
Cultural offices
Preceded by Aaron Hayter	Organist and Master of the Choristers of Hereford Cathedral; 1820–1832	Succeeded by Samuel Sebastian Wesley
