= Edwin Stephenson (organist) =

English church organist

- Born: 1871; Windermere, Cumbria, England
- Died: 1922 (aged 50–51)
- Education: Royal College of Music
- Occupation: church organist
- Years active: 1888–1922
- Known for: Tudor church music, organ compositions

Edwin Stephenson (1871–1922) was an English cathedral organist, who served in St. Philip's Cathedral, Birmingham.

== Background ==
He was born in Windermere, Cumbria in 1871. He was a pupil at the Royal College of Music.

His career started early when at the age of 14 he was appointed to Cartmel Priory as organist.

He was a proponent of Tudor church music and he published the Lamentations of Robert Whyte (a former organist at St. Margaret's Church, Westminster).

At a time when many organ recitals favoured transcriptions of orchestral works, Stephenson eschewed them in favour of organ compositions. His recital programmes included the sonatas and larger chorale fantasias of Max Reger and the later symphonies of Charles-Marie Widor.

== Career ==
Organist of:

- Cartmel Priory 1888–1891
- Holy Trinity Church, Sunningdale 1891–1901
- St Michael's Church, Brighton 1901–1905
- St Nicholas' Church, Brighton 1905–1906
- St. Philip's Cathedral, Birmingham 1906–1914
- St. Margaret's Church, Westminster 1914–1922

Cultural offices
Preceded by Arthur Elmore	Organist and Master of the Choristers of St. Philip's Cathedral, Birmingham; 1906–1914	Succeeded by William Frederick Dunnill
Preceded by Reginald Goss-Custard	Organist of St. Margaret's Church, Westminster; 1914–1922	Succeeded by Herbert Dawson
