= Nicholas Cook =

British musicologist and writer

Nicholas Cook, FBA (born 5 June 1950) is a British musicologist and writer born in Athens, Greece. From 2009 to 2017 he was the 1984 Professor of Music at the University of Cambridge, where he is a Fellow of Darwin College. Previously he was professorial research fellow at Royal Holloway, University of London, where he directed the Arts and Humanities Research Council Research Centre for the History and Analysis of Recorded Music (CHARM). He has also taught at the University of Hong Kong, University of Sydney, and University of Southampton, where he was dean of arts.

He is a former editor of the Journal of the Royal Musical Association and was elected a Fellow of the British Academy in 2001.

== Books ==
- (Edited by Patrick N. Juslin & A. Sloboda) Handbook of Music and Emotion : Theory, Research, Applications – (co-written with Nicola Dibben) Chapter 3 : Emotion in culture and history: perspectives from musicology. Oxford University Press, 2010.
- (Co-edited with Eric Clarke, Daniel Leech-Wilkinson, and John Rink) The Cambridge Companion to Recorded Music. Cambridge: Cambridge University Press, 2009.
- The Schenker Project: Culture, Race, and Music Theory in Fin-de-siècle Vienna. Oxford: Oxford University Press, 2007.
- Music, Performance, Meaning: Selected Essays. Aldershot: Ashgate, 2007.
- (Co-edited with Anthony Pople) The Cambridge History of Twentieth-Century Music. Cambridge: Cambridge University Press, 2004.
- (Co-edited with Eric Clarke) Empirical Musicology: Aims, Methods, Prospects. Oxford: Oxford University Press, 2004.
- (Co-edited with Mark Everist) Rethinking Music. Oxford: Oxford University Press, 1999.
- Music: A Very Short Introduction. Oxford: Oxford University Press, 1998.
- Analysing Musical Multimedia. Oxford: Clarendon Press, 1998.
- Beethoven: Symphony No. 9. Cambridge: Cambridge University Press, 1998.
- Music, Imagination, and Culture. Oxford: Clarendon Press, 1990.
- Musical Analysis and the Listener. New York: Garland, 1989.
- A Guide to Musical Analysis. London: Dent, 1987.

Academic offices
Preceded by Roger Parker	1684 Professor of Music; University of Cambridge; 2009 to 2017	Succeeded by Katharine Ellis
