= Joseph Jowett =

English Anglican cleric and jurist

Joseph Jowett (1752 – 13 November 1813) was an English Anglican cleric and jurist. He was Fellow and Tutor of Trinity Hall, Cambridge, and Regius Professor of Civil Law at Cambridge University from 1782 to 1813. He was the uncle of William Jowett.

== Life ==
The son of Henry Jowett of Leeds, Joseph Jowett was educated in Leeds before being admitted to Trinity College, Cambridge in 1769. He moved to Trinity Hall in 1773, becoming a Fellow there that year and a Tutor in 1775. He was Rector of Wethersfield, Essex from 1795 until his death in 1813. It is here at St. Mary Magdalene Church that he oversaw the vicarage to which Patrick Brontë had his first curacy.

He was known as "Little Jowett." He originated the Cambridge Chimes of Great St Mary’s Church, from which the chimes of Big Ben were adapted.
