= William Frederick Dunnill =

English cathedral organist

William Frederick Dunnill (1880–1936) was an English cathedral organist, who served in St. Philip's Cathedral, Birmingham.

== Background ==
He was born in Wakefield, Yorkshire on 16 March 1880. He was the son of Jeremiah Dunnill (Music Seller and Music Teacher) and Pollie. In 1891 they were living at 1 Cheapside, Wakefield

He was a pupil of Joseph Naylor Hardy at Wakefield Cathedral and of Sir Walter Parratt at St George's Chapel, Windsor Castle.

Whilst in Birmingham he acted as conductor of the Birmingham Bach Club. He was also a music master at King Edward's School, Birmingham.

He died in the vestry of St. Philip's Cathedral, Birmingham on 28 September 1936.

== Career ==
Assistant organist of Wakefield Cathedral 1897–1900

Organist of:

- Christ Church, Surbiton 1901–1902
- St. Luke's Church, Bromley 1902–1903
- St. Mary's Church, Nottingham 1903–1914
- St. Philip's Cathedral, Birmingham 1914–1936

Cultural offices
Preceded by James Arthur Page	Organist and Master of the Choristers of St. Mary's Church, Nottingham; 1903–1914	Succeeded by Frank Radcliffe
Preceded by Edwin Stephenson	Organist and Master of the Choristers of St. Philip's Cathedral, Birmingham; 1914–1936	Succeeded by Willis Grant
