= Sarah Hawkins =

British phonetician

- Awards: Leverhulme Major Research Fellowship; Fellow of the Acoustical Society of America

Academic work
- Discipline: linguistics
- Sub-discipline: phonetics, speech perception
- Institutions: University of Cambridge
- Doctoral students: Amalia Arvaniti

Sarah Hawkins is a British phonetician and Emeritus Professor of Speech and Music Science at Cambridge University. She is a Fellow of the Acoustical Society of America.
