= Stanley Badock =

English businessman and university administrator (1867-1945)

Stanley Hugh Badock
- Born: 27 April 1867
- Died: 12 December 1945
- Occupation(s): Businessman and university administrator

Sir Stanley Hugh Badock, JP (27 April 1867 – 12 December 1945) was an English businessman and university administrator.

== Biography ==
A director of the metal refiners Capper, Pass and Son Ltd, Badock was on the board from 1905 to 1936. A resident of Stoke Bishop, Bristol, in 1909 he was elected to the council of the newly founded University of Bristol. He became pro-vice-chancellor in 1922 and was then appointed to chair the council from 1926 (serving as pro-chancellor and chairman until his death). He was also treasurer from 1918 to 1936.

He was (Civic) Sheriff of Bristol for the 1908–1909 year, and was chair of the Bristol Civic League of Social Service from 1908 to 1936, and chaired the Bristol West Unionist Association. He was knighted in 1943 and awarded an honorary doctor of laws degree by Bristol in 1927.
