= Steven Grahl =

- Born: Crewe
- Genres: Choral music
- Occupation(s): Musicologist, Organist, Choirmaster
- Instrument: Pipe Organ
- Years active: 2001–present

Steven Grahl is the Director of Music at Trinity College, Cambridge. He is also conductor of Schola Cantorum of Oxford. He is a past president of the Incorporated Association of Organists, and previously conducted both the Peterborough Choral Society and the Stamford Chamber Orchestra. He was previously Director of Music and Organist at Christ Church, Oxford and Associate Professor at the Faculty of Music, University of Oxford.

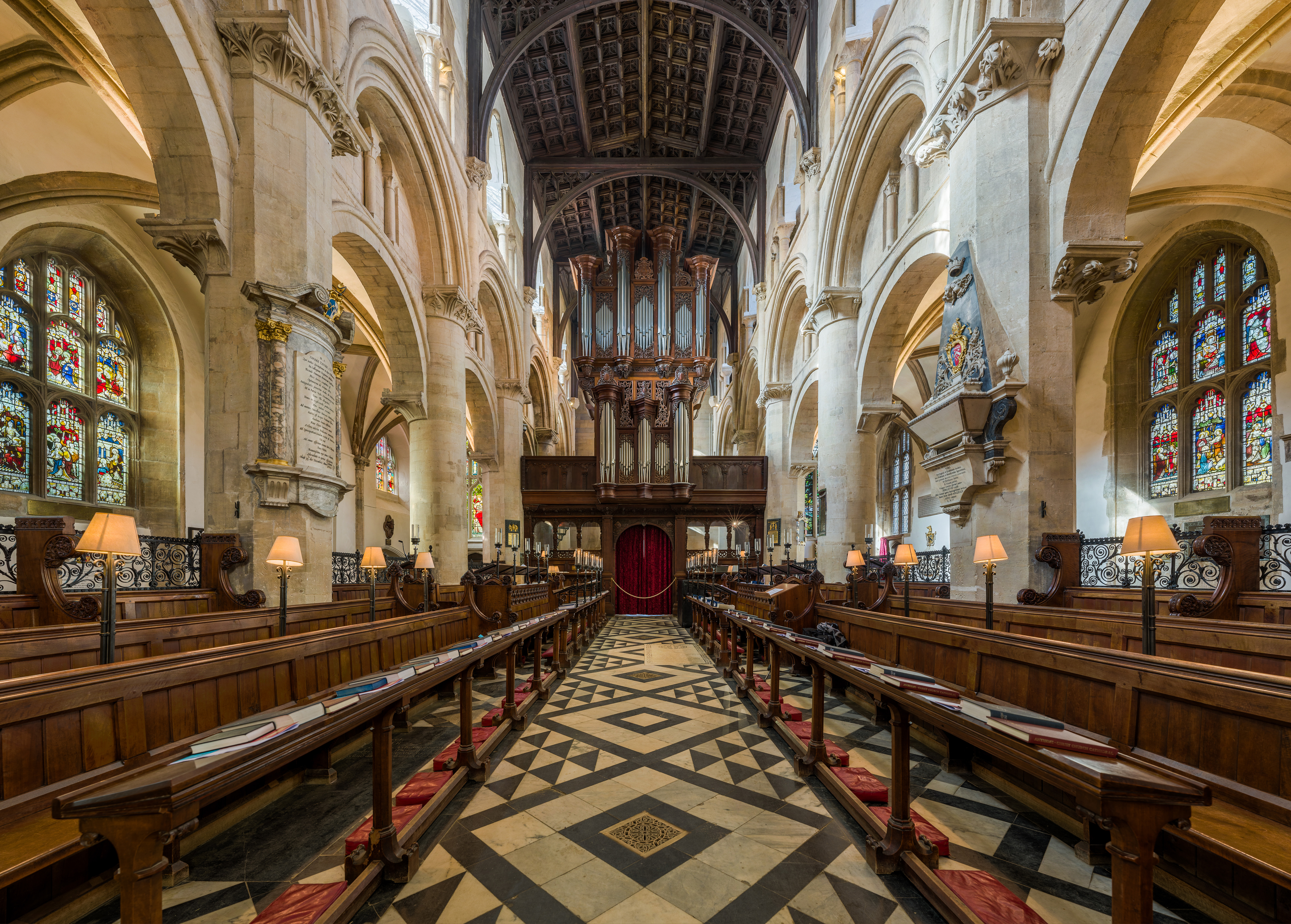
Christ Church Cathedral, towards the choir stalls and organ

Grahl is known for his work as Chorus-Master for films including Harry Potter and the Prisoner of Azkaban, Lord of the Rings: Return of the King and the Netflix series The Crown.

== Biography ==
Grahl started his musical career as a Chorister at Derby Cathedral. Following organ scholarships at Derby and Norwich Cathedrals, he was awarded an Organ Scholarship to Magdalen College, Oxford, graduating with a degree in music in 2001. He won the Betts prize for further study, and took up a Scholarship at the Royal Academy of Music. He was appointed Assistant Organist at St Marylebone Parish Church in March 2001, and was subsequently made Director of Music in December of the same year at the age of 22. Grahl gained the FRCO diploma and graduated with distinction from the Royal Academy of Music in 2003. He then went on to be an Associate of the Academy in 2010.

== Career ==
His career includes posts as:

- 2001–2014: Organist & Director of Music at St Marylebone Parish Church, London.
- 2007–2014: Assistant Organist at New College, Oxford.
- 2014–2018: Director of Music at Peterborough Cathedral.
- 2018–2023: Organist at Christ Church, Oxford.
- 2024-: Director of Music at Trinity College, Cambridge.

== Discography ==
As chorus-master:

- The Crown (Netflix 2015)
- The Phantom of the Opera (Sony 2004)
- The Bridge over San Luis Rey (2004)
- Finding Neverland (Decca 2004)
- Harry Potter and the Prisoner of Azkaban (Warner 2004)
- Lord of the Rings: Return of the King (Warner 2003)

As director:

- Christmas at Peterborough Cathedral.
- 2017: Frances-Hoad: Even You Song.

Cultural offices
Preceded by Robert Quinney	Organist and Master of the Choristers of Peterborough Cathedral; 2014–2018	Succeeded by Tansy Castledine
Preceded by Stephen Darlington	Organist and Master of the Choristers of Christ Church Cathedral, Oxford; 2018–2023	Succeeded by Peter Holder
