= John Larkin Hopkins =

English organist and composer

John Larkin Hopkins (25 November 1819 – 25 April 1873) was an English organist and composer, mostly of church music.

== Life ==
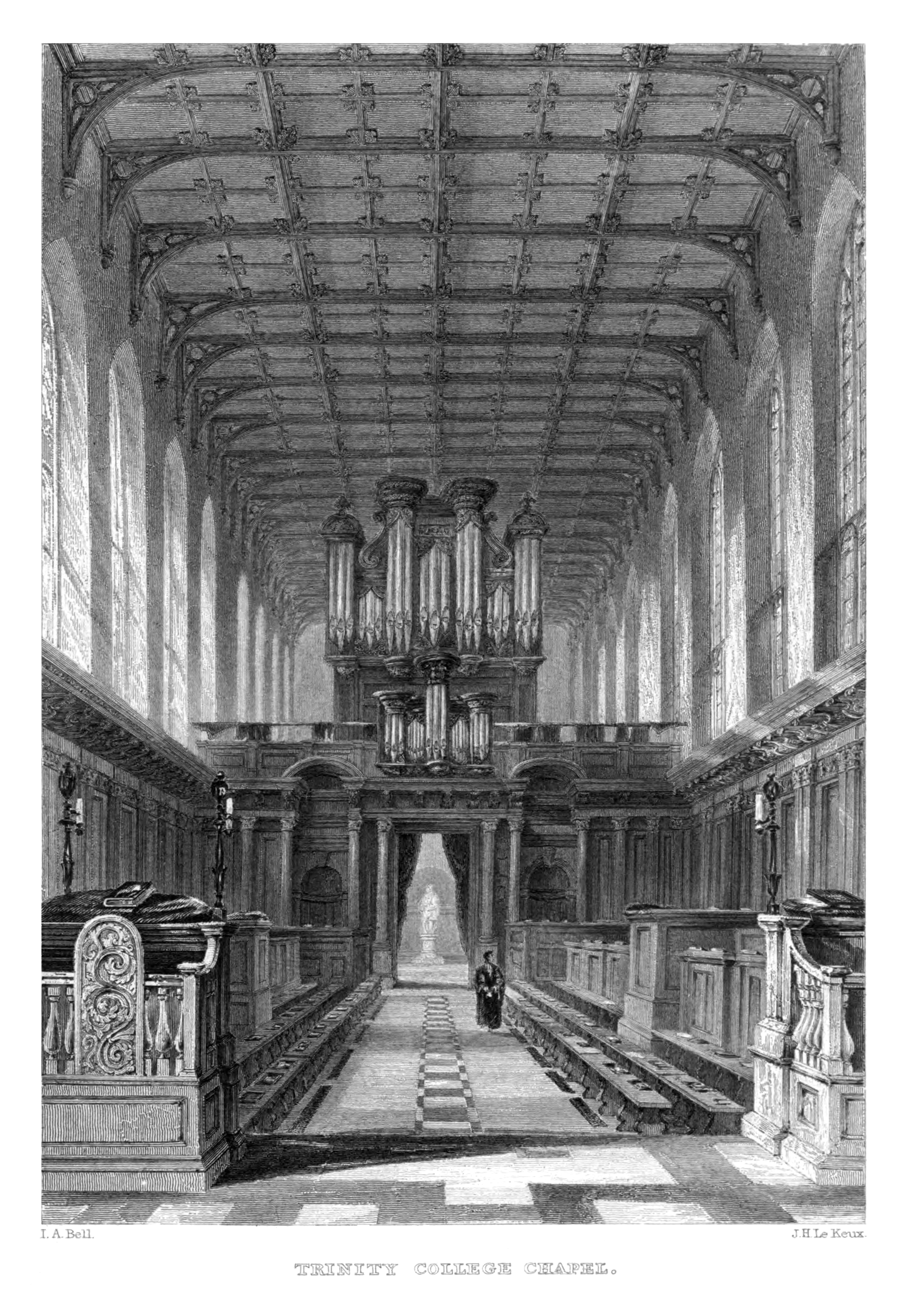
The Chapel of Trinity College, Cambridge, about 1840. Engraving by John Henry Le Keux.

He was born in Westminster on 25 November 1819, son of Edward Hopkins, a musician. The organist Edward John Hopkins was a cousin.

He sang for several years as chorister boy in Westminster Abbey, James Turle being the organist and master of the choristers. After leaving the abbey choir Hopkins devoted himself to the study of music, and particularly of the organ, with such success that in 1841, aged 22, he was chosen to succeed Ralph Banks as organist of Rochester Cathedral.

In 1842 Hopkins took the degree of Mus. Bac. at Cambridge University, and in 1856 was elected organist at Trinity College, Cambridge; he resigned his appointment at Rochester and moved to Cambridge. He proceeded to the degree of Mus. Doc. in 1857. He died at Ventnor, Isle of Wight, on 25 April 1873.

== Compositions ==
His compositions include Five Glees and a Madrigal (London, 1842); cathedral services in C flat and E flat (London, 1857); a collection of anthems, and several other services, anthems, songs, glees, and carols. He was the author of A New Vocal Tutor (London, 1855), and he published in 1847, with the Rev. S. Shepherd, a collection of words of anthems used in Rochester Cathedral.

Cultural offices
Preceded by Ralph Banks	Organist and Master of the Choristers of Rochester Cathedral; 1841–1856	Succeeded by John Hopkins
