= John Randall (organist) =

English organist and academic

John Randall (26 February 1716 – 18 March 1799) was an English organist and academic.

== Life ==
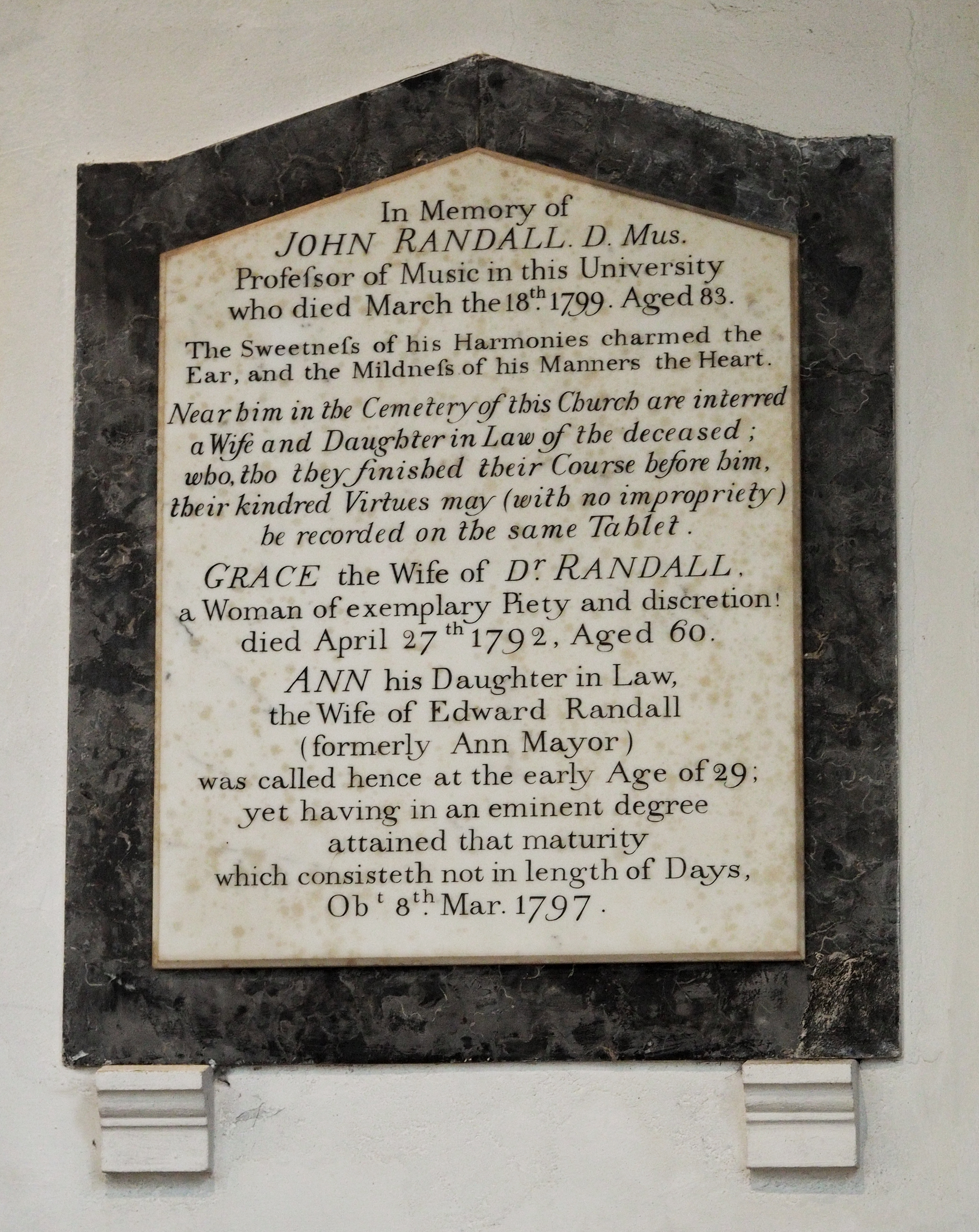
Memorial to John Randall in St Bene't's Church, Cambridge

John Randall was a chorister of the Chapel Royal under Bernard Gates. On 23 February 1732 at Gates's house, Randall acted and sang the part of Esther in a dramatic representation of Handel's oratorio Esther. In 1744 he graduated Mus. Bac. at Cambridge. In the following year he was appointed organist to King's College Chapel.

In 1755 Randall succeeded Maurice Greene as Professor of Music at Cambridge University. In 1756 he was awarded a Mus. Doc degree. Assisted by his pupil, William Crotch, who joined him in 1786, Randall retained his appointments until his death at Cambridge on 18 March 1799. His wife Grace predeceased him on 27 April 1792.

He is buried at St Bene't's Church, Cambridge, where there is a memorial with the following inscription

The Sweetness of his Harmonies charmed the Ear, and the Mildness of his Manners the Heart.

== Works ==
Randall set to music Thomas Gray's Ode for the Installation of the Duke of Grafton as Chancellor of the University, 1768. He published A Collection of Psalm and Hymn Tunes, some of which are new and others by permission of the authors, with six Chants and Te Deums, calculated for the use of congregations in general, Cambridge, 1794; these six were his original tunes. Randall is best known by his two double chants (Grove). The Hopeless Lover (London, 1735?), and other songs were attributed to him.

In the American Sacred Harp tradition William Cowper's hymn The Contrite Heart is sung to Randall's tune Cambridge New.

== Attribution ==
This article incorporates text from a publication now in the public domain: "Randall, John (1715-1799)". Dictionary of National Biography. London: Smith, Elder & Co. 1885–1900.
