= Roll =

Roll may refer to:

== Physics and engineering ==
- Rolling, a motion of two objects with respect to each-other such that the two stay in contact without sliding
- Roll angle (or roll rotation), one of the 3 angular degrees of freedom of any stiff body (for example a vehicle), describing motion about the longitudinal axis
  - Roll (aviation), one of the aircraft principal axes of rotation of an aircraft (angle of tilt to the left or right measured from the longitudinal axis)
  - Roll (ship motion), one of the ship motions' principal axes of rotation of a ship (angle of tilt to the port or starboard measured from the longitudinal axis)
- Rolling manoeuvre, a manoeuvre of any stiff body (for example a vehicle) around its roll axis:
  - Roll, an aerobatic maneuver with an airplane, usually referring to an aileron roll, but sometimes instead a barrel roll, rudder roll or slow roll
  - Kayak roll, a maneuver used to right a capsized kayak
  - Roll program, an aerodynamic maneuver performed in a rocket launch
- Roll rate (or roll velocity), the angular speed at which an aircraft can change its roll attitude, typically expressed in degrees per second

== Food ==
- Bread roll, a small individual loaf of bread
- Roll (food), a type of food that is either rolled in its preparation, rolled in something, served in a bread roll, or otherwise called a "roll"

== Arts, entertainment and media ==
- Roll (Anne McCue album), 2004
- Roll (Emerson Drive album), 2012
- "Roll", a song by Flo Rida from the 2008 album Mail on Sunday (album)
- Roll (Mega Man), a character in the Mega Man video game franchise
- Banjo roll, a pattern played by the banjo
- Drum roll, a percussion technique
- Legato or rolls, a guitar technique
- Music roll, a storage medium to operate a mechanical instrument
- Roll, a Hungarian pill bug in the 1998 animated film A Bug's Life

== People ==
=== Roll ===
- Roll baronets, a title in the Baronetage of the United Kingdom
- Alfred Philippe Roll (1846–1919), French painter
- Bob Roll (born 1960), American professional cyclist and commentator
- Curtis Roll (1884–1970), an American judge
- Eric Roll, Baron Roll of Ipsden (1907–2005), academic economist, public servant and banker
- Ferdinand Nicolai Roll (1831–1921), Norwegian jurist and politician
- George Roll (born 1962), an American ice hockey coach
- Gernot Roll (1939–2020), a German cinematographer
- Idan Roll (born 1984), an Israeli politician
- Jacob Roll (born 1783) (1783–1870), a Norwegian judge and politician
- Jacob Roll (born 1794) (1794–1857), a Norwegian politician
- John Roll (1947–2011), a United States federal judge
- Lawson Roll (born 1965), an English cricketer
- Martin Roll (born 1967), a Danish author and management consultant
- Michael Roll (actor) (born 1961), German television actor
- Michael Roll (basketball) (born 1987), American basketball player
- Michael Roll (pianist) (born 1946), British pianist
- Richard Roll (born 1939), American economist
  - Roll's critique
- Sigurd Roll (1893–1944), Norwegian diplomat and athlete
- Stephan Roll (1904-1974), Romanian poet
- Sylvia Roll (born 1973), German volleyball player
- Thomas Røll (born 1977), retired Danish professional footballer
- William G. Roll (1926–2012), American psychologist and parapsychologist

=== de Roll ===
- Louis de Roll (1750-?), a Swiss soldier during the French Revolutionary and Napoleonic Wars
  - Roll's Regiment, a regiment of the British Army raised in 1794

== Places ==
- Roll, Arizona, U.S.
- Roll, Indiana, U.S.
- Roll, Oklahoma, U.S.
- Roll, German name for Ralsko, town in the Czech Republic

== Other uses ==
- Glossary of bowling#Roll, the final phase of bowling ball motion
- Roll (gymnastics), a fundamental skill in gymnastics
- Roll, a British obsolete unit of measurement for butter and cheese
- Coin wrapper or roll, a container for a number of coins
- Scroll, or roll, a rolled-up piece of parchment or paper
- Roll (finance), process of switching to a contract with a later expiry date
- Jelly roll (options), an options trading strategy
- An official list of registered individuals, such as an electoral roll or the Dawes Rolls.
- An RNG roll

== See also ==
- Role (disambiguation)
- Roll call (disambiguation)
- Rolle (disambiguation)
- Roller (disambiguation)
- Rolling (disambiguation)
- Rolls (disambiguation)
- List of rolled foods
- Rock and roll, or rock 'n' roll, a genre of popular music
