= Maria Mandl =

Austrian Holocaust perpetrator (1912–1948)

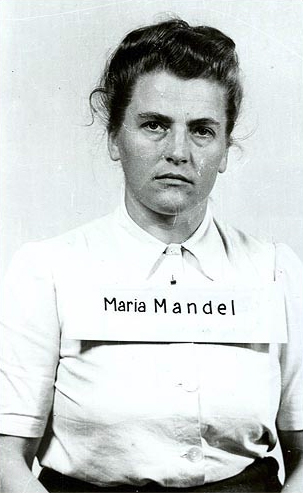
- Mandl in U.S. custody, August 1945
- Born: 10 January 1912; Münzkirchen, Austria-Hungary
- Died: 24 January 1948 (aged 36); Montelupich Prison, Kraków, Polish People's Republic
- Political party: Nazi Party
- Status: Executed by hanging
- Motive: Nazism
- Conviction: Crimes against humanity
- Trial: Auschwitz trial
- Penalty: Death
- SS-Gefolge (Note: The women in SS-Gefolge were not regarded as members of the Schutzstaffel.)
- Allegiance: Nazi Germany
- Service years: 1938–1945
- Rank: Lichtenburg Aufseherin; Ravensbrück Oberaufseherin; Auschwitz II-Birkenau Lagerführerin
- Service number: NSDAP 8,920,045

Maria Mandl (/ˈmɑːndəl/, MAHN-dul; sometimes erroneously spelled Mandel; 10 January 1912 – 24 January 1948) was an Austrian-born Holocaust perpetrator and convicted war criminal. From 1942 until her arrest in 1945, she served as the Schutzhaftlagerführerin (camp leader) at the Auschwitz II-Birkenau concentration camp. She also held positions at the Lichtenburg and Ravensbrück camps as Aufseherin (overseer) and Oberaufseherin (head overseer), respectively.

Mandl was born in Münzkirchen, Austria-Hungary, into a middle-class Catholic family affiliated with the Christian Social Party (CSP). Following the annexation of Austria by Nazi Germany in 1938, she moved to Munich and found work as an Aufseherin at the Lichtenburg concentration camp. There, she subjected prisoners to fatal beatings and floggings. In 1939, she was transferred to Ravensbrück, where she was promoted to Oberaufseherin. She oversaw the training program for prospective Aufseherinnen and worked alongside Dorothea Binz in the camp's punishment block. Mandl's final promotion came in 1942, when she was transferred to Auschwitz II-Birkenau and given the position of Schutzhaftlagerführerin under the command of Rudolf Höss. As the Red Army advanced toward the Auschwitz complex in late 1944, Mandl was transferred to the Mettenheim camp. In May 1945, as the United States Air Force invaded and bombed the area, Mandl fled with her lover, Kommandant Walter Adolf Langleist, and a Jewish prisoner known as Mose. After evading arrest for three months, Mandl and Langleist were apprehended by the American military police in August 1945 at Langleist's home in Hof.

Mandl was convicted of crimes against humanity at the Auschwitz trial in Kraków in December 1947. Based on the number of death lists she signed, it is believed that she had been complicit in the deaths of approximately 500,000 prisoners during her tenure at Birkenau. In January 1948, she was executed by hanging at the age of thirty-six. Her last words were "Polska żyje" ("Poland lives").

== Early life ==
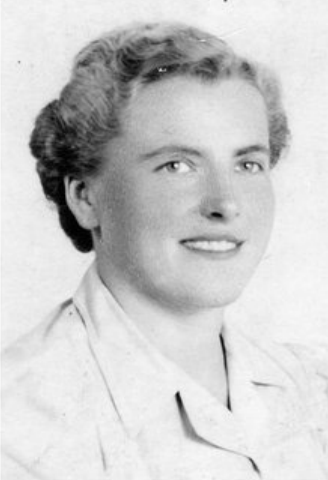
Mandl, c. before 1938

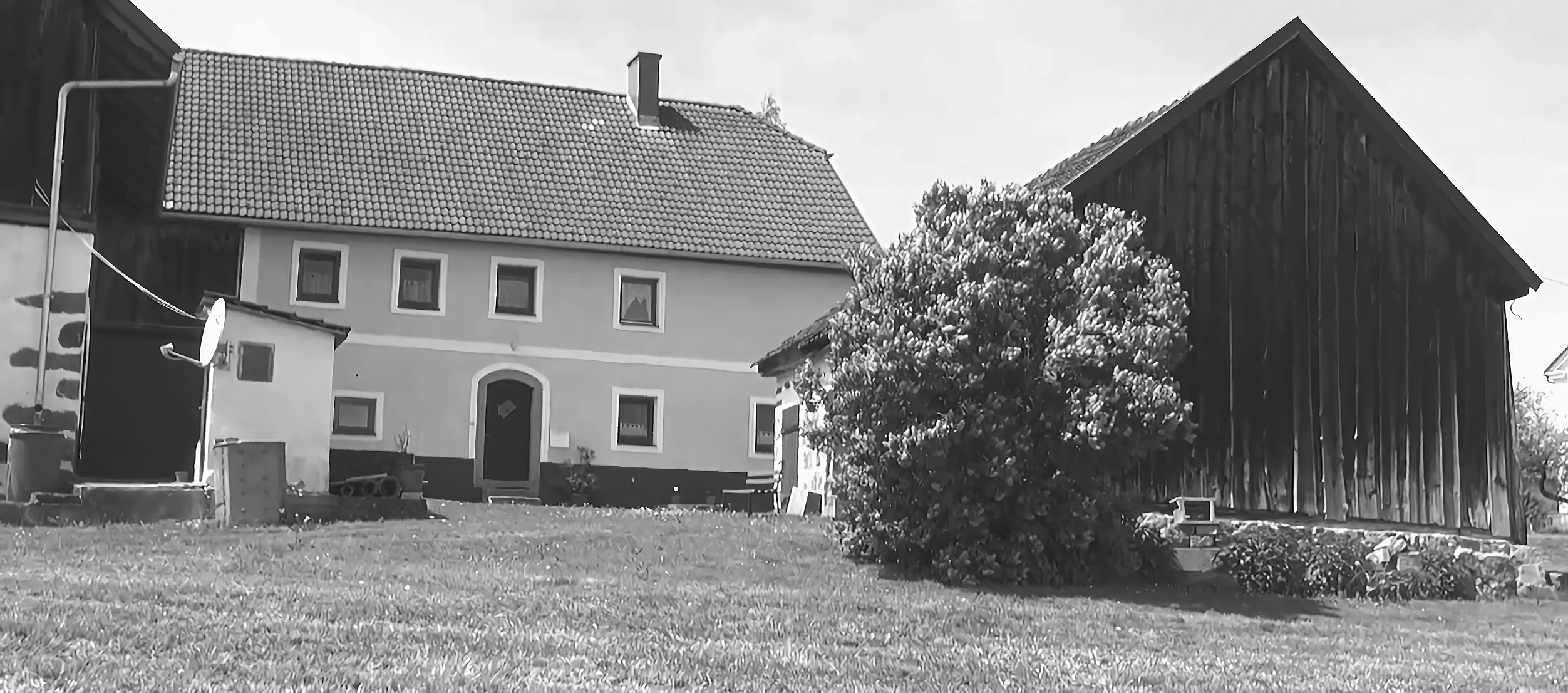
The Mandl family's home in Münzkirchen, undated

Maria Mandl was born at 10:00 pm on 10 January 1912 in Münzkirchen, Austria-Hungary, into a middle-class Catholic family. (Note: Neumayr & Strasser 2014, at 00:02:32) She was raised on a farm, which was regarded by locals as the largest in the municipality, (Note: Neumayr & Strasser 2014, at 00:09:01) and had three older siblings: Georg, Anna, and Aloisia. Her father, Franz Mandl, was a shoemaker who worked out of his own shop and was opposed to the Nazi Party, instead supporting the Christian Social Party (CSP). Her mother, Anna Streibl, was a housewife who suffered from depressive episodes and had a nervous breakdown during Mandl's childhood. In the 2014 documentary Pechmarie: The Life of Maria Mandl, former Münzkirchen mayor Martin Zauner described the Mandls as "a good, Catholic family" who were "definitely against the Third Reich". (Note: Neumayr & Strasser 2014, at 00:59:34)

On 20 July 1924, at the age of twelve, Mandl was withdrawn from school without completing an exit exam to help on the family farm. In 1927, she was admitted to a Catholic boarding school in Neuhaus am Inn, from which she graduated. A former classmate of Mandl's, Paula Bauer, described her as having been "cheerful" and "very nice". (Note: Neumayr & Strasser 2014, at 00:09:30) After graduating in 1930, Mandl struggled to find work locally, prompting her to move to Brig, Switzerland, where she found a position as a housekeeper and cook for thirteen months. She eventually became homesick and returned to Münzkirchen to live with her parents. In 1934, she found work as a chambermaid at a private villa in Innsbruck, but in 1936 once again returned home due to her parents' declining health. (Note: Neumayr & Strasser 2014, at 00:03:16) That same year, she was hired at the local post office and became engaged to a Wehrmacht soldier. (Note: Neumayr & Strasser 2014, at 00:04:49)

After Nazi Germany annexed Austria in 1938, Mandl's engagement ended, and she lost her job at the post office. As a Third Reich soldier, her fiancé believed that her family's affiliation with the CSP could harm his reputation and affect his chances of finding employment in the civil service in the future. Mandl had been fired from her job for similar reasons; her family was openly opposed to the Third Reich, and she herself had no allegiance to the Nazi Party.

== Employment in concentration camps ==
=== Lichtenburg (1938–1939) ===
In September 1938, Mandl moved to Munich to live with her uncle, a police constable, with the intention of having him get her a position in the police force. None were available, however, and he instead encouraged her to apply for the position of Aufseherin at the Lichtenburg concentration camp in Prettin. Mandl would later claim after her 1945 arrest that she had only taken the job because the salary was higher than that of a nurse, and that she had known "nothing" about concentration camps.

Mandl began working at the camp on 15 October. (Note: Neumayr & Strasser 2014, at 00:05:21) She completed a training program structured around Nazi ideology and took a twenty-question exam on geography, history, and dates significant to the Nazi Party. During her first three months as Aufseherin, she was under the supervision of an experienced guard. Mandl had undergone training with her cousin, Maria Gruber, but the latter resigned early on because she was disgusted by the violence at the camp. (Note: Neumayr & Strasser 2014, at 00:13:07)

Mandl worked under Kommandant Max Koegel and Oberaufseherin Johanna Langefeld. According to testimonies from survivors Emilie Neu and Lina Haag, Mandl subjected prisoners to whippings, beatings, and strenuous exercises—a practice referred to as "sport" in both victim and perpetrator accounts. In one incident, Mandl struck a prisoner repeatedly with a metal key until she lost consciousness, then dragged her across the camp and put her in a solitary cell. Another survivor, unnamed, recalled an encounter with Mandl when the woman was still new. The survivor had told the latter that she was "too pretty to play supervisor," to which Mandl replied, "No I swore the oath to the Führer, I'm staying".

=== Ravensbrück (1939–1942) ===
On 15 May 1939, Mandl was transferred to the Ravensbrück concentration camp, where she continued to work under Koegel and Langefeld. She assisted with roll calls, overseeing work details, and handling attack dogs. Whilst stationed at work details, Mandl was known to have physically and verbally abused prisoners if she believed them to be working too slowly. She also took on a leading role in the camp's training program upon its official designation as the training site for prospective Aufseherinnen. In the summer of 1939, she trained Hermine Braunsteiner, who later described Mandl as having been "very strict" and "unfavorable" during her training, recalling instances Mandl hit prisoners.

In early 1940, Mandl, along with Oberaufseherin Dorothea Binz, was assigned to the on-camp jail referred to as the "cell block" or "punishment block". It was here that prisoners were flogged, receiving twenty-five strikes on their buttocks. Austrian survivor Marko Feingold later recalled how he and his brother endured this abuse five times per day, receiving twenty-five strikes every time. (Note: Neumayr & Strasser 2014, at 00:14:47) In an interrogation following her arrest, Mandl claimed that prisoners in the block were only kept in cells for up to a month and were provided with coffee and bread every day. However, survivors' testimonies contradict this statement, describing how food had been withheld.

In 1941, Mandl became a member of the National Socialist Women's League. (Note: Neumayr & Strasser 2014, at 00:13:35) In April 1942, she was promoted to the rank of Oberaufseherin following Langefeld's transfer to Auschwitz II-Birkenau in March, as the latter had been unable to maintain "brutality and structure" within the camp.

=== Auschwitz II-Birkenau (1942–1944) ===
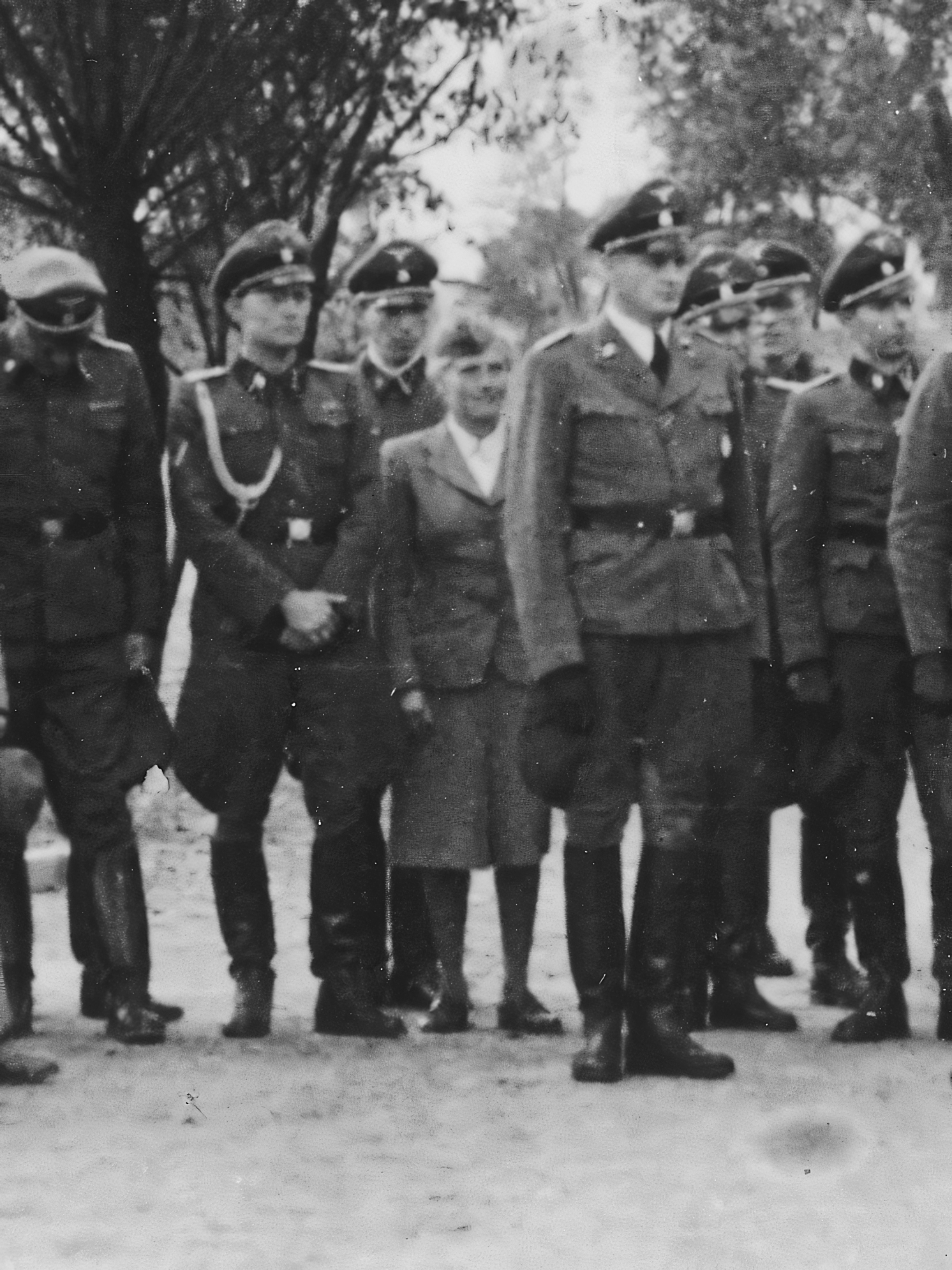
Mandl was the only female guard present during the opening of the SS hospital in Auschwitz, 1 September 1944

In October 1942, Mandl was sent to Auschwitz II-Birkenau, where she succeeded Langefeld in rank for the second time upon being promoted to the position of Schutzhaftlagerführerin. (Note: Neumayr & Strasser 2014, at 00:23:21) She resided in on-camp housing, with gynecologist Carl Clauberg as her neighbor. (Note: Neumayr & Strasser 2014, at 00:37:35) In this position, her only superior was Kommandant Rudolf Höss, who regarded her highly. On 27 March 1944, he gave her a salary increase of 100 Reichsmarks as well as control of all the female subcamps in the Auschwitz complex, including Hindenburg O.S., Lichtewerden, and Rajsko. During this period, Mandl promoted Irma Grese to the position of Oberaufseherin and appointed Therese Brandl as her secretary. In November, Mandl was awarded the War Merit Cross, Second Class.

The cruelty Mandl had subjected prisoners to in Lichtenburg and Ravensbrück continued. At Birkenau, when new prisoners arrived, she used a cane to extract expensive items and jewelry hidden in women's vaginas. She took these items back with her to Münzkirchen when visiting her family and kept them hidden inside a drawer. (Note: Neumayr & Strasser 2014, at 00:26:38) According to survivor Anita Lasker-Wallfisch, Mandl would stand in front of the camp's front gate whilst prisoners were lined up. If a prisoner made eye contact with her, they were removed from the line and killed. She also tested prisoners returning from outside work details by holding a cane fifty centimeters above the ground and forcing every person to jump over it. Those who succeeded were allowed to proceed to roll call, while those who failed were sent to the gas chamber. Moreover, survivor Regina Lebensfeldová-Hofstädterová, who had been a typist in the camp's political department, stated that Mandl referred to prisoners as mistbienen (dung beetles). Over the next two years, Mandl signed death lists on a weekly basis and partook in selections alongside SS doctors. (Note: Neumayr & Strasser 2014, at 00:25:48)

Mandl provided care to a select few children in Birkenau, giving them extra food and engaging them in activities like dancing and singing. (Note: Neumayr & Strasser 2014, at 00:28:23) Survivor Ella Lingens-Reiner has attested to this, having recalled witnessing two children leaving Mandl's office with cookies and chocolate. Lingens-Reiner has also stated that Mandl once asked a pregnant German prisoner to give her the child after its birth, because she herself was not able to have children. Her alleged infertility has since been suggested as an explanation as to why she behaved differently towards the children at the camp. Conversely, she had also carried a two-year-old Polish boy to be killed in the gas chamber herself after having clothed and fed him for several days.

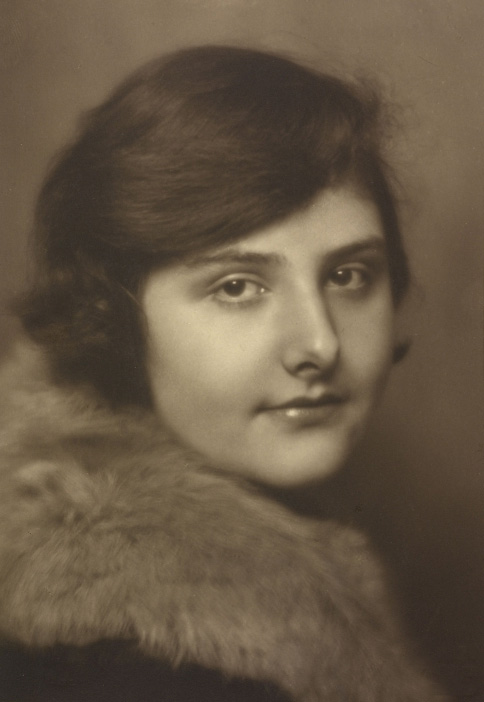
Alma Rosé, c. before March 1927

==== The Women's Orchestra and Alma Rosé ====
In April 1943, Mandl, with Hauptsturmführer Franz Hössler, began organizing the Women's Orchestra of Auschwitz after seeing the success of men's orchestras in the main camp. Mandl instructed block leaders and other prisoners assigned to internal work details, such as in the political unit, to recruit prisoners who could play an instrument. Zofia Czajkowska, who had been a music teacher, was chosen by Mandl to be the orchestra's first conductor, partly because her surname sounded like "Tchaikovsky".

The orchestra performed at the entrance of Birkenau as prisoners left for and returned from work details. The orchestra also performed in the hospital block and in the showers. Concerts were also held for SS members every Sunday for the camp personnel. During the winter season, members of the orchestra were not required to stand outside for roll calls and were instead counted inside their barracks. They were also allowed to shower daily and were given proper bedding, as well as tables to eat on. For concerts, women were given uniforms consisting of a dark blue skirt, white blouse, black stockings, and a gray-and-blue striped jacket made from the material of their prison uniforms. By the end of June, the orchestra had grown to twenty members, and by 1944, it had reached its peak of forty-two.

When I observed her during a successful concert, especially with a new performance by Alma, then her face would radiate, literally radiate. She would take on an expression of deep soulfulness. When Alma performed her solo, there was surprise (astonishment) in Mandl's eyes—that the product was so good.

— Helena Dunicz-Niwińska, 2003

In August 1943, Czajkowska was replaced as conductor of the orchestra by Austrian violinist Alma Rosé, the daughter of Arnold Rosé and niece of Gustav Mahler. Mandl arranged for Rosé to be transferred from Auschwitz I, where she had been imprisoned since July, to Birkenau for the sole purpose of having her lead the orchestra. According to testimonies from surviving orchestra members, Mandl had "genuine respect" for Rosé and would call her "Frau Alma". Moreover, when Rosé arrived at Birkenau, Mandl had taken it upon herself to change the woman's classification from "Dutch Jew" to "Mischling" ("part Jew"), so she had a more respectable standing as head of the orchestra. Additionally, on one occasion, when Rosé became ill Mandl allowed her to rest in a private room. On another, she assured Rosé that she would be "the last" to be sent to the gas chamber. However, Mandl had also become aggressive with Rosé at one point when the latter recruited more Jewish women into the orchestra, yelling at Rosé that she did not want to have a "Jewish orchestra" and accusing her of "scheming against Polish women".

On 2 April 1944, Rosé became sick and delirious. Mandl once again gave her a private room, this time in the hospital block. Rosé died three days later, on 5 April, at the age of thirty-eight. The cause of death is unknown, though botulism and food poisoning has since been suspected. Mandl openly mourned Rosé's death and allowed all members of the orchestra to see her one last time.

=== Mettenheim (1944–1945) ===
In December 1944, Mandl was suddenly transferred to the Mettenheim concentration camp in Mühldorf am Inn, as an invasion by the Red Army became imminent. There, she oversaw five hundred female prisoners, (Note: Neumayr & Strasser 2014, at 00:40:50) as well as women in the Waldlager V and VI subcamps. Mandl met Kommandant Walter Adolf Langleist and began a relationship with him in 1945. (Note: Neumayr & Strasser 2014, at 00:41:15)

In April 1945, the United States Air Force bombed the Mettenheim camp, which was then followed by a ground invasion on 1 May. Mandl and Langleist fled with a Jewish inmate, only known as Mose, amidst gunfire and temporarily sought refuge in the woods. (Note: Neumayr & Strasser 2014, at 00:42:39) They subsequently went into hiding in Mandl's home in Innviertel for a couple weeks. In July, Mandl returned to her family home in Münzkirchen to stay there, but her father did not let her inside the house. Still with Langleist and Mose, Mandl was able to find them refuge at her sister's farm in Łuck, where they stayed for three days. (Note: Neumayr & Strasser 2014, at 00:43:49) Mandl would later allege that Mose "betrayed her" and Langleist within this timeframe to "take revenge for harm caused by different people". (Note: Neumayr & Strasser 2014, at 00:44:22) In August, Langleist was arrested by the American military police after survivor Max Katler identified him. Mandl was arrested soon after at Langleist's home in Hof. (Note: Neumayr & Strasser 2014, at 00:47:41)

== Trial and execution ==
Maria Mandl behaves differently. She does her best to be in control of herself but her efforts are futile. The woman who condemned female prisoners to death with a single gesture now cannot control her accelerated breathing, unnatural blush and nervous twitching of her entire face.

— Echo Krakowa, 24 December 1947

Mandl in Kraków on 24 November 1947, during the Auschwitz trial

Mandl was imprisoned at the Dachau concentration camp, where she was interrogated by Americans, whom she described as "violent but smart". (Note: Neumayr & Strasser 2014, at 00:48:00) On 11 July 1946, she was transferred to Polish custody on grounds of the London Agreement and her disproportionate cruelty towards Polish prisoners. For the remainder of her life, Mandl was incarcerated at Montelupich Prison, where she shared a cell with Brandl. (Note: Neumayr & Strasser 2014, at 00:51:55) That September, Mandl was tried and convicted by Poland's Supreme National Tribunal. She would only plead guilty on 5 March 1947 after confessing to have signed most death lists during her time at Birkenau. (Note: Neumayr & Strasser 2014, at 01:03:08) On 22 December 1947, she was found guilty of crimes against humanity (Note: Per Eischeid's work, there was overwhelming evidence presented during the trial to prove that (1) Mandl took part in the death selection process at Ravensbrück and Auschwitz II-Birkenau, (2) used force to get prisoners into cars that would take them to gas chambers, (3) separated children from their mothers and beat them, (4) killed pregnant women by selecting them for the gas chambers and having them injected with phenol, (5) selected more than eighty prisoners for medical experiments involving limb regeneration whilst at Ravensbrück, (6) was involved in the deaths of babies who were found with fatal burns, (7) subjected prisoners to inhumane torture (i.e., kneeling on sharp rocks, kicking, whipping, caning), and (8) selected women to be sent to the camp's brothel.) and sentenced to death by hanging, one of forty defendants and one of only four women in what would become known as the Auschwitz trial. (Note: Neumayr & Strasser 2014, at 01:04:37) Based on the number of lists signed with her name, Mandl is believed to have been complicit in the deaths of approximately 500,000 people.

Mandl wrote an appeal for clemency to Polish president Bolesław Bierut, claiming innocence; her lawyers also attempted to get her pardoned but their request was rejected. (Note: Neumayr & Strasser 2014, at 01:06:55) In the days leading up to her execution, she spent her time praying and teaching herself Polish. She also sought forgiveness from anti-Communist activist Stanisława Rachwałowa, who was formerly imprisoned in Auschwitz and later incarcerated in Montelupich upon being sentenced to death by communist authorities.

On 24 January 1948, at 7:32 A.M., Mandl was executed by hanging at the age of thirty-six. She allegedly resisted the guards who escorted her, and her final words, spoken in Polish, were "Polska żyje" ("Poland lives"). She was the fifth person executed that morning, after Arthur Liebehenschel, Hans Aumeier, Maximilian Grabner, and Karl Möckel. In total, twenty-one Nazis were executed that day. Unlike some of the men's executions, Mandl's hanging was not filmed. (Note: Neumayr & Strasser 2014, at 01:08:14)

== Aftermath ==
Hours after her execution, Mandl's body was sent to the Jagiellonian University Medical College for students to experiment on for a six-week period. (Note: Neumayr & Strasser 2014, at 01:12:29) On 6 March, her body was moved to the Rakowicki Cemetery in Kraków and buried in a wooden box at an unmarked spot. (Note: Neumayr & Strasser 2014, at 01:12:58) Mandl's father had been aware of the atrocities his daughter committed and did not request for her remains to be sent home. Her mother died in 1944 and had attended Mass every day, where she "prayed for her daughter's eternal soul". The Mandl family's tomb in Münzkirchen does not have Maria's name engraved. (Note: Neumayr & Strasser 2014, at 01:13:57)

In November 1975, Mandl's death certificate was recovered. Issued by the District Court of Ried im Innkreis, the document claimed that she had died in a concentration camp as a prisoner and regarded her as a "victim of National Socialism". (Note: Neumayr & Strasser 2014, at 01:14:20) Lawyer Robert Eiter and the Austrian Mauthausen Committee demanded for corrections to be made. It was not until April 2017 that the Ried im Innkreis regional court amended the certificate to reflect Mandl's role in the Holocaust.
