= 33rd Primetime Emmy Awards =

1981 American television programming awards

- Date: September 13, 1981 (Ceremony); September 12, 1981 (Creative Arts Awards)
- Location: Pasadena Civic Auditorium, Pasadena, California
- Presented by: Academy of Television Arts and Sciences
- Hosted by: Shirley MacLaine; Edward Asner

Highlights
- Most awards: Hill Street Blues (6)
- Most nominations: Hill Street Blues (14)
- Outstanding Comedy Series: Taxi
- Outstanding Drama Series: Hill Street Blues
- Outstanding Limited Series: Shōgun
- Outstanding Variety, Music or Comedy Program: Lily: Sold Out

Television/radio coverage
- Network: CBS

The 33rd Primetime Emmy Awards were held on Sunday, September 13, 1981. The ceremony was broadcast on CBS. It was hosted by Shirley MacLaine and Edward Asner. 25 awards were presented.

For the third consecutive year, the Emmy for Outstanding Comedy Series went to Taxi. The top show on the drama side was Hill Street Blues which, in its first season, tied the record for most major nominations (14) and wins (6) by a non-miniseries. NBC's ratings juggernaut Shōgun received eight major nominations, but only won one, for Outstanding Limited Series.

== Winners and nominees ==
=== Programs ===
Programs
Outstanding Comedy Series: Taxi (ABC); Barney Miller (ABC); M*A*S*H (CBS); Soap (ABC); WKRP in Cincinnati (CBS)	Outstanding Drama Series: Hill Street Blues (NBC); Dallas (CBS); Lou Grant (CBS); Quincy, M.E. (NBC); The White Shadow (CBS)
Outstanding Drama Special: Playing for Time (CBS); Evita Peron (NBC); Fallen Angel (CBS); The Shadow Box (ABC); The Women's Room (ABC)	Outstanding Limited Series: Shōgun (NBC); East of Eden (ABC); Masada (ABC); Rumpole of the Bailey (PBS); Tinker Tailor Soldier Spy (PBS)
Outstanding Variety, Music or Comedy Program: Lily: Sold Out (CBS); AFI Life Achievement Award: A Tribute to Fred Astaire (CBS); The Benny Hill Show (Syndicated); The Muppet Show (Syndicated); The Tonight Show Starring Johnny Carson (NBC)

=== Acting ===
==== Lead performances ====
Acting
Outstanding Lead Actor in a Comedy Series: Judd Hirsch as Alex Reiger in Taxi (ABC) (Episode: "Elaine's Strange Triangle"); Alan Alda as Hawkeye Pierce in M*A*S*H (CBS); Hal Linden as Capt. Barney Miller in Barney Miller (ABC); Richard Mulligan as Burt Campbell in Soap (ABC); John Ritter as Jack Tripper in Three's Company (ABC)	Outstanding Lead Actress in a Comedy Series: Isabel Sanford as Louise Jefferson in The Jeffersons (CBS) (Episode: "And the Doorknobs Shined Like Diamonds"); Eileen Brennan as Mrs. McKenzie in Taxi (ABC) (Episode: "Thy Boss's Wife"); Cathryn Damon as Mary Campbell in Soap (ABC); Katherine Helmond as Jessica Tate in Soap (ABC); Lynn Redgrave as Ann Atkinson in House Calls (CBS)
Outstanding Lead Actor in a Drama Series: Daniel J. Travanti as Captain Frank Furillo in Hill Street Blues (NBC); Edward Asner as Lou Grant in Lou Grant (CBS); Jim Davis as Jock Ewing in Dallas (CBS); Louis Gossett Jr. as Bessie's Father in Palmerstown, U.S.A. (CBS) (Episode: "Future City"); Larry Hagman as J.R. Ewing in Dallas (CBS); Pernell Roberts as Dr. John 'Trapper' McIntyre in Trapper John, M.D. (CBS)	Outstanding Lead Actress in a Drama Series: Barbara Babcock as Grace Gardner in Hill Street Blues (NBC) (Episode: "Fecund Hand Rose"); Barbara Bel Geddes as Miss Ellie Ewing in Dallas (CBS); Linda Gray as Sue Ellen Ewing in Dallas (CBS); Veronica Hamel as Joyce Davenport in Hill Street Blues (NBC); Michael Learned as Mary Benjamin in Nurse (CBS); Stefanie Powers as Jennifer Hart in Hart to Hart (ABC)
Outstanding Lead Actor in a Limited Series or a Special: Anthony Hopkins as Adolf Hitler in The Bunker (CBS); Richard Chamberlain as Anjin-san in Shōgun (NBC); Toshirô Mifune as Lord Yoshi Toranaga in Shōgun (NBC); Peter O'Toole as General Cornelius Flavius Silva in Masada (ABC); Peter Strauss as Eleazar ben Yair in Masada (ABC)	Outstanding Lead Actress in a Limited Series or a Special: Vanessa Redgrave as Fania Fenelon in Playing for Time (CBS); Ellen Burstyn as Jean Harris in The People vs. Jean Harris (NBC); Catherine Hicks as Marilyn Monroe in Marilyn: The Untold Story (ABC); Yôko Shimada as Lady Toda Buntaro in Shōgun (NBC); Joanne Woodward as Elizabeth Huckaby in Crisis at Central High (CBS)

==== Supporting performances ====
Outstanding Supporting Actor in a Comedy or Variety or Music Series: Danny DeVito as Louie De Palma in Taxi (ABC); Howard Hesseman as Johnny Caravella in WKRP in Cincinnati (CBS); Steve Landesberg as Sgt. Arthur Dietrich in Barney Miller (ABC); Harry Morgan as Sherman T. Potter in M*A*S*H (CBS); David Ogden Stiers as Charles Emerson Winchester III in M*A*S*H (CBS)	Outstanding Supporting Actress in a Comedy or Variety or Music Series: Eileen Brennan as Doreen Lewis in Private Benjamin (CBS); Loni Anderson as Jennifer Marlowe in WKRP in Cincinnati (CBS); Anne Meara as Veronica Rooney in Archie Bunker's Place (CBS); Marla Gibbs as Florence Johnston in The Jeffersons (CBS); Loretta Swit as Margaret Houlihan in M*A*S*H (CBS)
Outstanding Supporting Actor in a Drama Series: Michael Conrad as Sgt. Phil Esterhaus in Hill Street Blues (NBC); Mason Adams as Charlie Hume in Lou Grant (CBS); Charles Haid as Officer Andy Renko in Hill Street Blues (NBC); Robert Walden as Joe Rossi in Lou Grant (CBS); Bruce Weitz as Det. Mick Belker in Hill Street Blues (NBC)	Outstanding Supporting Actress in a Drama Series: Nancy Marchand as Margaret Pynchon in Lou Grant (CBS) (Episode: "Stroke"); Barbara Barrie as Evelyn Stoller in Breaking Away (ABC); Barbara Bosson as Fay Furillo in Hill Street Blues (NBC); Linda Kelsey as Billie Newman in Lou Grant (CBS); Betty Thomas as Sgt. Lucille Bates in Hill Street Blues (NBC)
Outstanding Supporting Actor in a Limited Series or a Special: David Warner as Falco in Masada (ABC); Andy Griffith as Ash Robinson in Murder in Texas (NBC); Yūki Meguro as Omi in Shōgun (NBC); Anthony Quayle as Rubrius Gallus in Masada (ABC); John Rhys-Davies as Vasco Rodrigues in Shōgun (NBC)	Outstanding Supporting Actress in a Limited Series or a Special: Jane Alexander as Alma Rose in Playing for Time (CBS); Colleen Dewhurst as Val in The Women's Room (ABC); Patty Duke as Lily in The Women's Room (ABC); Shirley Knight as Frau Lagerfuhrerin Maria Mandel in Playing for Time (CBS); Piper Laurie as Magda Goebbels in The Bunker (CBS)

=== Directing ===
Directing
Outstanding Directing in a Comedy Series: Taxi (ABC): "Elaine's Strange Triangle" – James Burrows; Archie Bunker's Place (CBS): "Tough Love" – Linda Day; Barney Miller (ABC): "Liquidation" – Noam Pitlik; Happy Days (ABC): "Hello, Mrs. Arcola" – Jerry Paris; M*A*S*H (CBS): "The Life You Save" – Alan Alda; M*A*S*H (CBS): "No Laughing Matter" – Burt Metcalfe; WKRP in Cincinnati (CBS): "Venus Flytrap Explains the Atom" – Rod Daniel	Outstanding Directing in a Drama Series: Hill Street Blues (NBC): "Hill Street Station" – Robert Butler; American Dream (ABC): "Pilot" – Mel Damski; Hill Street Blues (NBC): "Jungle Madness" – Corey Allen; Hill Street Blues (NBC): "Up in Arms" – Georg Stanford Brown; Lou Grant (CBS): "Pack" – Burt Brinckerhoff; Lou Grant (CBS): "Strike" – Gene Reynolds
Outstanding Directing in a Variety, Music or Comedy Program: The Kennedy Center Honors: A Celebration of the Performing Arts (CBS) – Don Mischer; The 53rd Annual Academy Awards (ABC) – Marty Pasetta; Barbara Mandrell and the Mandrell Sisters (NBC) – Bob Henry; Great Performances: "Dance in America" (PBS) – Emile Ardolino; Linda in Wonderland (CBS) – Dwight Hemion; Musical Comedy Tonight II (PBS) – Tony Charmoli	Outstanding Directing in a Limited Series or a Special: Kent State (NBC) – James Goldstone; Bitter Harvest (NBC) – Roger Young; Masada (ABC): "Part IV" – Boris Sagal; The Shadow Box (ABC) – Paul Newman; Shōgun (NBC): "Part 5" – Jerry London

=== Writing ===
Writing
Outstanding Writing in a Comedy Series: Taxi (ABC): "Tony's Sister and Jim" – Michael Leeson; The Greatest American Hero (ABC): "Pilot" – Stephen J. Cannell; M*A*S*H (CBS): "Death Takes a Holiday" – Story by : Thad Mumford, Dan Wilcox and Burt Metcalfe Teleplay by : Mike Farrell, John Rappaport and Dennis Koenig; Taxi (ABC): "Elaine's Strange Triangle" – David Lloyd; Taxi (ABC): "Going Home" – Glen Charles and Les Charles	Outstanding Writing in a Drama Series: Hill Street Blues (NBC): "Hill Street Station" – Michael Kozoll and Steven Bochco; American Dream (ABC): "Pilot" – Ronald M. Cohen, Barbara Corday and Ken Hecht; Hill Street Blues (NBC): "Jungle Madness" – Michael Kozoll, Steven Bochco and Anthony Yerkovich; Lou Grant (CBS): "Rape" – Seth Freeman; Lou Grant (CBS): "Strike" – April Smith
Outstanding Writing in a Variety, Music or Comedy Program: The Muppet Show (Syndicated): "Carol Burnett"; AFI Life Achievement Award: A Tribute to Fred Astaire (CBS); Lily: Sold Out (CBS); Musical Comedy Tonight II (PBS); The Tonight Show Starring Johnny Carson (NBC): "18th Anniversary Show"	Outstanding Writing in a Limited Series or a Special: Playing for Time (CBS) –Arthur Miller; Bitter Harvest (NBC) – Richard Friedenberg; Masada (ABC): "Part IV" – Joel Oliansky; The Shadow Box (ABC) – Michael Cristofer; Shōgun (NBC): "Part 5" – Eric Bercovici

== Most major nominations ==
Networks with multiple major nominations (Note: "Major" constitutes the categories listed above: Program, Acting, Directing, and Writing. Does not include the technical categories.)
Network	Number of Nominations
CBS	52
ABC	40
NBC	32

Programs with multiple major nominations
Program	Category	Network	Number of Nominations
Hill Street Blues	Drama	NBC	14
Lou Grant	Drama	CBS	10
M*A*S*H	Comedy	CBS	8
Shōgun	Miniseries	NBC	8
Taxi	Comedy	ABC	8
Masada	Miniseries	ABC	7
Dallas	Drama	CBS	5
Playing for Time	Special	CBS	5
Barney Miller	Comedy	ABC	4
Soap	Comedy	ABC	4
WKRP in Cincinnati	Comedy	CBS	4
The Shadow Box	Special	ABC	3
The Women's Room	Special	ABC	3
AFI Life Achievement Award: A Tribute to Fred Astaire	Variety	CBS	2
American Dream	Drama	ABC	2
Archie Bunker's Place	Comedy	CBS	2
Bitter Harvest	Special	NBC	2
The Bunker	Special	CBS	2
The Jeffersons	Comedy	CBS	2
Lily: Sold Out	Variety	CBS	2
The Muppet Show	Variety	Syndicated	2
Musical Comedy Tonight II	Variety	PBS	2
The Tonight Show Starring Johnny Carson	Variety	NBC	2

== Most major awards ==
Networks with multiple major awards
Network	Number of Awards
CBS	10
NBC	8
ABC	6

Programs with multiple major awards
Program	Category	Network	Number of Awards
Hill Street Blues	Drama	NBC	6
Taxi	Comedy	ABC	5
Playing for Time	Special	CBS	4
