= Claire Monis =

French-born musician and Holocaust survivor (1922–1967)

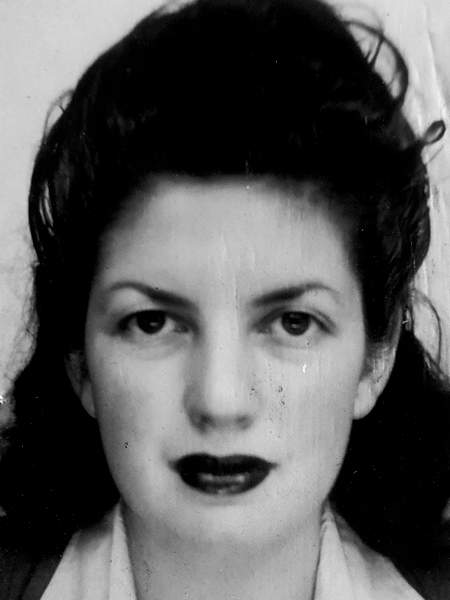
- Monis in 1946
- Born: 10 February 1922; 10th arrondissement of Paris, France
- Died: 25 October 1967 (aged 45); 16th arrondissement of Paris, France
- Resting place: Cimetière parisien de Bagneux, Bagneux, Hauts-de-Seine, France
- Occupations: Singer, violinist, producer
- Known for: Lieutenant in the French resistance, Holocaust survivor who performed in the Auschwitz women's orchestra
- Children: 2, including Philippe Kahn

Signature
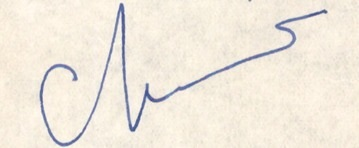

Claire Monis (10 February 1922 – 25 October 1967) was a French singer, actress, and lieutenant in the French resistance. She was a Holocaust survivor as a member of the Auschwitz Women's Orchestra. After WW2, Claire was a producer of movies and TV shows.

== Family and childhood ==
Monis was born on 10 February 1922 in the 10th arrondissement of Paris. Her parents, Avroum (alias Albert) Monis, a theatre bellman, Klezmer clarinet and accordion player, a cabinet maker, and Suzanne Aisenstein, originally from Russia, emigrated to France beginning of the 20th century, fleeing the anti-Semitic pogroms in Russia. They married on 7 May 1921 in the 18th arrondissement of Paris and obtained French citizenship in 1928 with their two daughters. The couple set up as furniture merchants with the sign "Aux Galeries Saint-Maur", which later became a cabinetmaking shop "Les Meubles Monis".

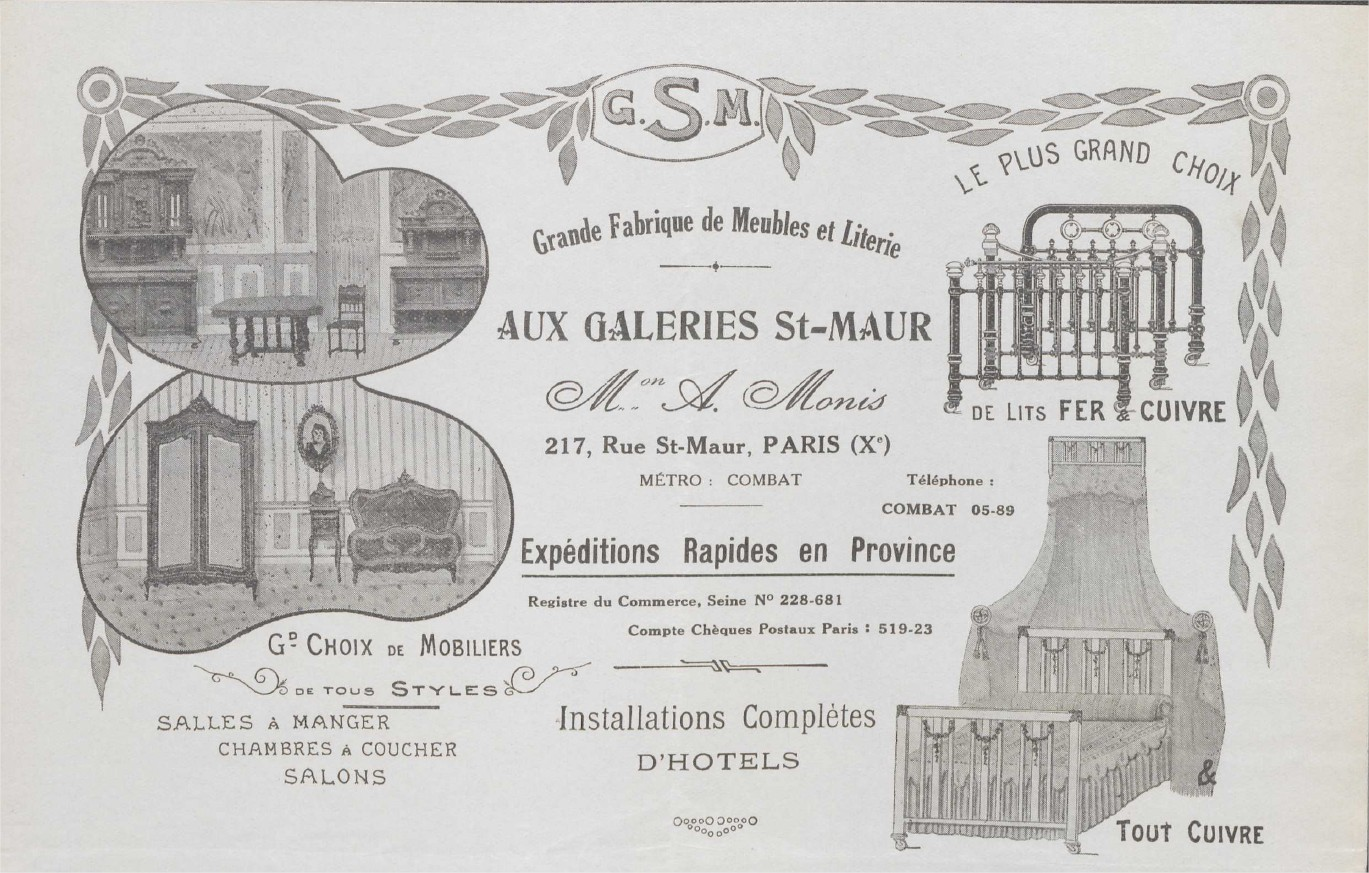
Advertisement "Aux Galeries Saint Maur" with the name of M. Monis

== Singing career ==
In 1938, Monis won the "music-hall des jeunes", a competition organized by the French federation of communist youths, which led her to take part with Pierre Dac in the youth gala. In addition, she took part in radio concerts, notably in Charles Trenet's program for the Radio Cité station, with Élyane Célis and André Perchicot She also sang in the cinema where she played the role of "Clarita" in the film "Je chante", a musical comedy directed in 1938 by Christian Stengel with Charles Trenet.

Monis sang in Parisian cabarets: with Jacques Pills at the cabaret "Chez Elle", at "La Boîte à Sardines"; described as a "swing singer", she hosted the evenings of the cabaret "Au Normandy". She participated, notably with Paul Meurisse and Marguerite Gilbert, in the grand opening gala of the cabaret " À la Cave de la Cloche ". She also participated in the programme of the cabaret " L'Écrin ", 19 rue Joubert Paris 9e, with Léo Marjane, Jacqueline Figus and Jean Solar.

== Resistance and deportation ==
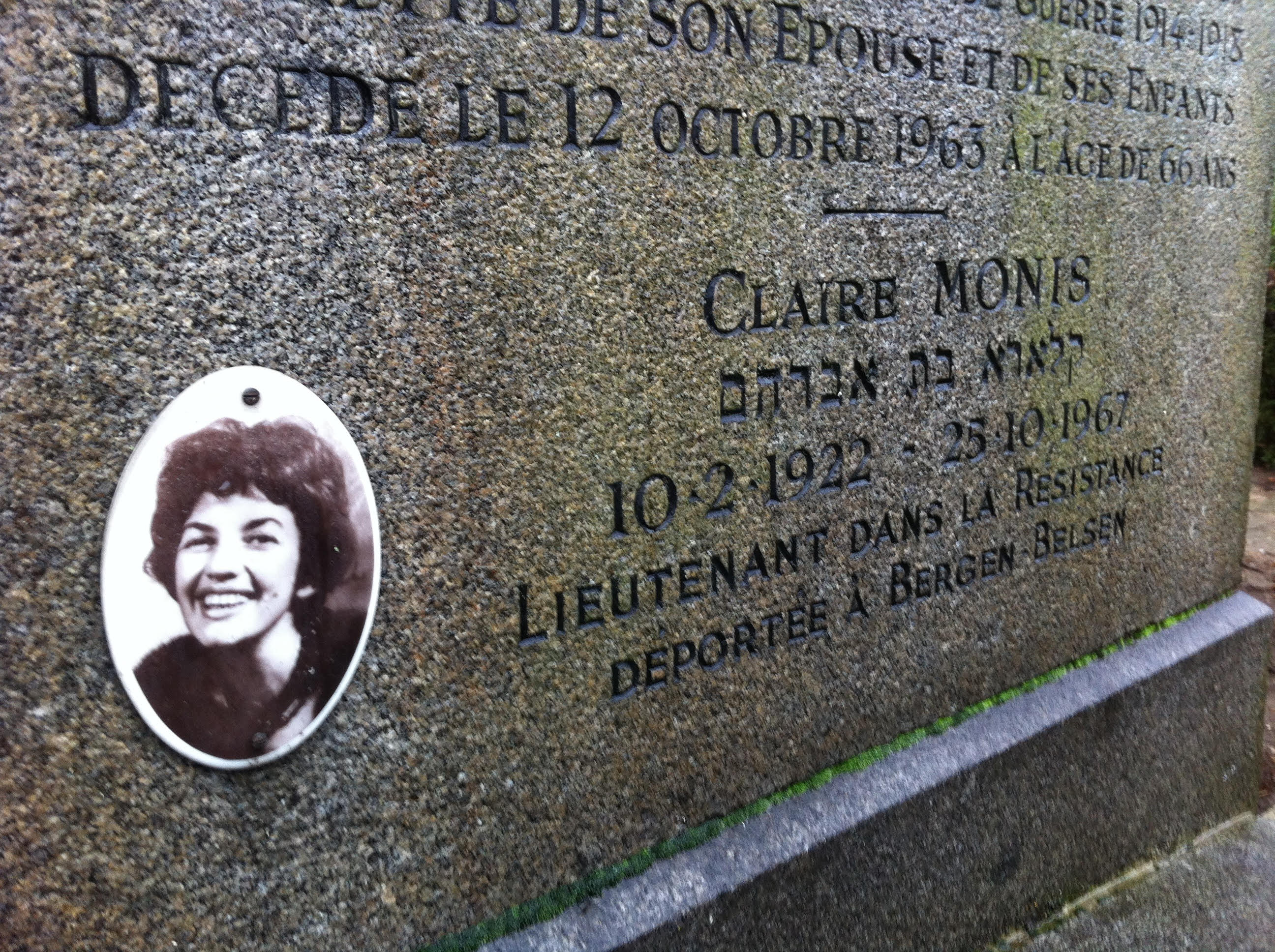
Grave of Claire Monis at Cemetery of Bagneux

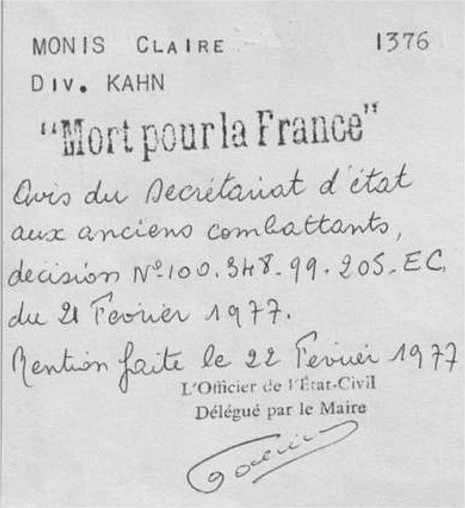
Extract death act for Claire Monis 1967

Monis was a Resistance fighter in the Free French Forces (FFL) and the Fighting French Forces (FFC) within the Robin-Buckmaster network created by Jacques Weil and of which she was the secretary. She used her singing tour (song order and word changes) to inform her network.

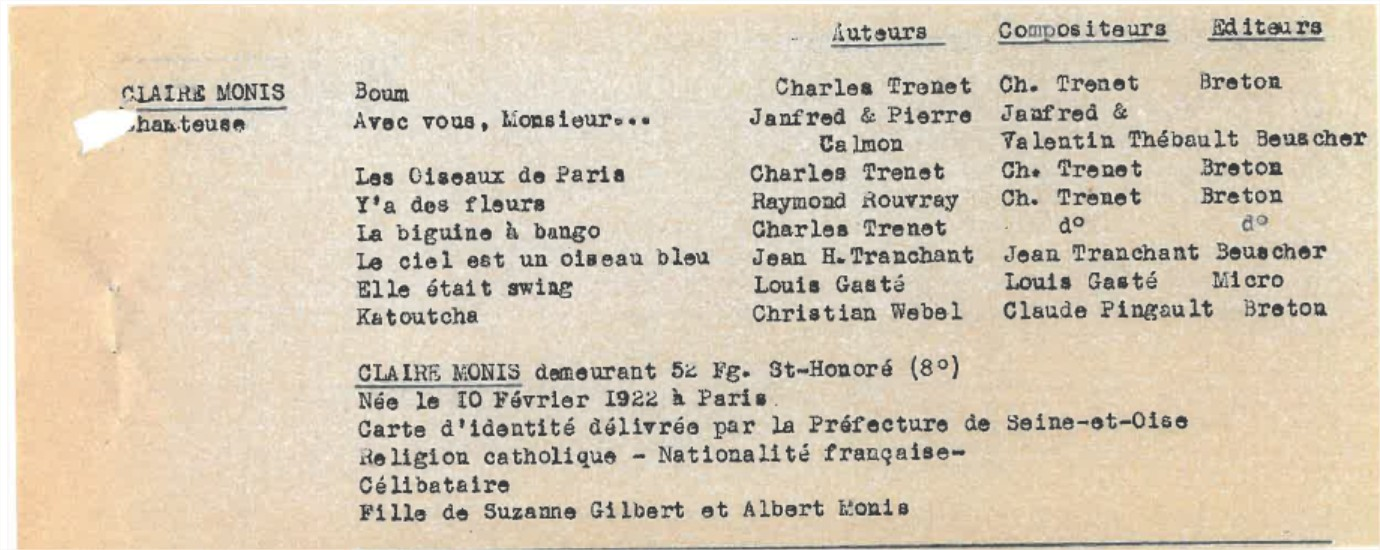
List of songs for Claire Monis

She was arrested on 22 June 1942 at 6, place du Combat in Paris, and sent to Fresnes prison, then interned on 10 September 1942 at the Autun citadel in the Saône-et-Loire department.

She declared herself to be non-Jewish and tried in vain to obtain a Catholic baptism certificate. Still, the new director of the status of Jewish people (under the general commissariat for Jewish questions), Emile Boutmy, demanded her father's birth certificate, which was impossible to provide. As a result, Monis was classified as "100% Jewish", on 22 December 1943. She was sent to the Drancy camp where she left 100 francs at the Caisse des Dépôts et Consignation before being deported to Auschwitz by convoy no. 66 on 20 January 1944. She was 21 years old. She escaped the extermination after being recruited into the Auschwitz women's orchestra as a singer in the orchestra led by Alma Rosé. There she met other French women, including Hélène Rounder and Fanny Ruback, who also survived. All the survivors were transferred on 31 October 1944 to the Bergen-Belsen camp, where they arrived on 2 November 1944. The camp was liberated on 15 April 1945 by the British army. Monis was repatriated by truck on 17 May 1945 to Paris. She obtained her certificate as part of the French Fighting Force with the rank of Lieutenant of the French Resistance.

== After the war ==
A book by Professor Susan Eischeid details the relationships between the survivors of the Orchestra, including the 1976 Fania Fenelon’s narrative, contradicted by those of Violette Jacquet-Silberstein, Anita Lasker-Wallfisch as well as Helena Dunicz-Niwińska.

Monis met Charles-Henri Kahn (1915-1999) in 1945 at a Gaullist rallye and married him in 1947 in the 8th arrondissement of Paris. From this marriage two children were born, one of whom was Philippe Kahn in 1952. They were separated in 1957 and divorced in 1961. Monis raised her son Philippe alone. He was granted the status of the "ward of the Nation", after her death, thanks to Monis’s anticipation.

Monis pursued her career as a violinist and singer (classical, klezmer, and jazz) and frequently received her friends from the Resistance (such as Jacques Weil) and musicians around the family piano. She played with Luis Mariano in 1948 in the operetta Andalousie by Francis Lopez at the Gaîté-Lyrique, and performed the role again in 1949 and 1950 in Lyon.

== Filmography ==
Monis then became a producer at ORTF and Radio France. After several trips to Canada and the United States, she turned to production with television series and movies

- L'Inspecteur Leclerc in 1962
- Les Aventures de Robinson Crusoé in 1964-1965,
- Marcel Carné's Trois chambres à Manhattan in 1965
- Jean-Pierre Melville's Le Deuxième Souffle in 1966
- L'Echantillon, La Mendigote and Le Golem in 1966 from Jean Kerchbron.
- and her last production : "Pitchi Poï ou la parole donnée" in 1967

== Death ==
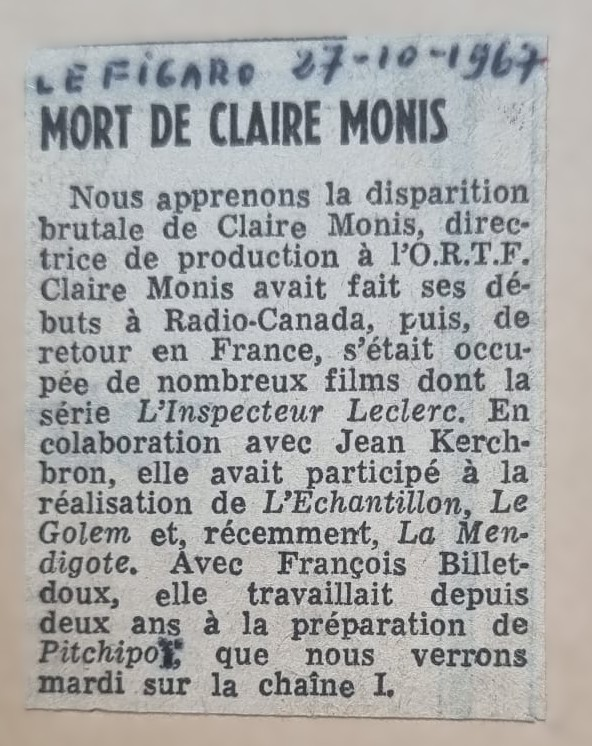
Death notice in the press

Monis was hit by a car in front of her parents' shop at 11 Rue du Faubourg du Temple, at 11th arrondissement of Paris. She died a few days later as a result of this accident, on 25 October 1967 at her home in the 16th arrondissement of Paris. She was buried on 27 October 1967 in the Parisian cemetery of Bagneux. The words "Mort pour la France" were added to her death certificate in 1977.
