= Playing for Time (film) =

1980 television film

- Genre: Drama; Music
- Written by: Arthur Miller based on Fania Fénelon (autobiography The Musicians of Auschwitz)
- Directed by: Daniel Mann; Joseph Sargent (uncredited)
- Starring: Vanessa Redgrave; Jane Alexander
- Music by: Brad Fiedel
- Original language: English

Production
- Producer: Linda Yellen
- Production locations: Fort Indiantown Gap, Annville, Pennsylvania
- Cinematography: Arthur J. Ornitz
- Editor: Jay Freund
- Running time: 150 minutes
- Production company: Szygzy Productions

Original release
- Network: CBS
- Release: September 30, 1980

Playing for Time is a 1980 CBS television film directed, written by Arthur Miller and based on musician Fania Fénelon's autobiography The Musicians of Auschwitz. Vanessa Redgrave stars as Fénelon.

Playing for Time was based on Fénelon's experience as a female prisoner in the Auschwitz concentration camp, where she and a group of classical musicians were spared in return for performing music for their captors. The film was later adapted as a play by Miller.

Parts of the film were directed by Joseph Sargent, but only Mann was credited as director.

== Plot ==
Fania Fénelon, a French Jewish singer-pianist, is sent with other prisoners to the Auschwitz concentration camp in a crowded train during World War II. After having their belongings and clothes taken and their heads shaved, the prisoners are processed and enter the camp. Fénelon is recognized as being a famous musician and she finds that she will be able to avoid hard manual labor and survive longer by becoming a member of the prison's female orchestra, the Women's Orchestra of Auschwitz.

In the process, she strikes up a close relationship with Alma Rosé, the musical group's leader, as well as the other members of the band. Realizing that the musicians get better treatment than other prisoners, Fania convinces the guards and members of the orchestra that another prisoner she had befriended, Marianne, is actually a talented singer. Although Marianne performs poorly at her audition, she is allowed to join the orchestra. Playing for the Nazis, however, robs the women of much of their dignity and most of them are often questioning whether remaining alive was worth the abuse they constantly suffer.

== Cast ==
- Vanessa Redgrave as Fania Fénelon
- Jane Alexander as Alma Rosé
- Maud Adams as Mala Zimetbaum
- Christine Baranski as Olga
- Robin Bartlett as Etalina
- Marisa Berenson as Elzvieta
- Verna Bloom as Paulette
- Donna Haley as Katrina
- Lenore Harris as Charlotte
- Mady Kaplan as Varya
- Will Lee as Shmuel
- Anna Levine as Michou
- Shirley Knight as SS-Lagerführerin Maria Mandl
- Viveca Lindfors as Frau Schmidt
- Max Wright as SS Doctor Josef Mengele
- Melanie Mayron as Marianne
- Marcell Rosenblatt as Giselle
- Martha Schlamme as woman on train
- Eoin Stewart as British Radio Operator
- Ron Lamb as British Soldier
- Maurice Whitlock as SS Guard

== Production ==
The cast rehearsed together in New York City and subsequently filmed in Pennsylvania on a six-week shooting schedule. During the half-way stage of shooting the producers decided to replace Joseph Sargent with Daniel Mann as director.

It is also notable as one of the first film productions where an ensemble of actresses shaved their heads for the sake of their roles.

=== Casting controversy ===
The producer Linda Yellen was determined to cast Redgrave in the lead role at a time when the actress was facing protests from Jewish organizations for her criticism of Zionism and her pro-Palestinian position. Subsequently, security was required at rehearsals and Yellen's office was broken into. There were further complications when Fénelon herself appeared on CBS's 60 Minutes arguing against Redgrave's casting and suggested Jane Fonda or Liza Minnelli as a replacement. During the production Fénelon continued to criticize Redgrave's politics on her speaking tours across the USA. Actresses on the project had also been contacted with the view of making a statement against Redgrave's casting. They refused and instead released a press release denouncing blacklisting and expressed their desire to work with Redgrave.

As a result of Redgrave's political views, the film was initially banned in Israel, although she appealed to Jordan's culture minister to buy the rights to the film to show on Jordanian television. She wished that both Arabs and Israelis should have the opportunity to see the film.

== Reception ==
Playing for Time was praised by critics and garnered several awards and nominations; It was the most viewed prime time program on United States television for the week of its release in 1980, with a rating of 26.2, watched in 20.4 million homes.

The show earned a 35% viewing share in Los Angeles, winning its timeslot.

=== Awards and nominations ===
Year	Award	Category	Nominee(s)	Result	Ref.
1980	Peabody Awards	—N/a	CBS Entertainment	Won	
1981	Golden Globe Awards	Best Miniseries or Motion Picture Made for Television		Nominated	
1981	Primetime Emmy Awards	Outstanding Drama Special	Linda Yellen and John E. Quill	Won	
1981	Primetime Emmy Awards	Outstanding Lead Actress in a Limited Series or a Special	Vanessa Redgrave	Won	
1981	Primetime Emmy Awards	Outstanding Supporting Actress in a Limited Series or a Special	Jane Alexander	Won	
1981	Primetime Emmy Awards	Outstanding Supporting Actress in a Limited Series or a Special	Shirley Knight	Nominated	
1981	Primetime Emmy Awards	Outstanding Writing in a Limited Series or a Special	Arthur Miller	Won	
1981	Primetime Emmy Awards	Outstanding Art Direction for a Limited Series or a Special	Robert Gundlach and Gary Jones	Nominated	

== DVD release ==
After its television broadcast, the film was released on VHS, and later on DVD in the United States in 2010.

== Historical controversy ==
Playing for Time the movie, and the memoir upon which it is based, have assumed an important place in Holocaust scholarship. Since its publication and tremendous commercial success, Fénelon's testimony has been accepted as truth and widely dispersed in a plethora of academic, popular, and musical resources. This has proved a source of great frustration and heartache for the other survivors of the orchestra, who almost unanimously found Fénelon's representation of their orchestra and its personnel false and demeaning. They have fought a fierce battle in the decades since Playing for Time appeared to have their version of the orchestra and its history represented.

Some attention has been paid to their concerns, but in large part they have been ignored. The greatest sources of anguish are the inaccurate portrayal of Alma Rosé, the slanderous portrayals of many of the other musicians, and the diminishment by Fénelon of their bond and support for one another.
