= Rolle (disambiguation) =

Rolle is a municipality in the canton of Vaud, Switzerland.

Rolle may also refer to:

== People ==
- Antrel Rolle (born 1982), American football safety
- Bacchus Rolle, Bahamian politician
- Brian Rolle (born 1988), American football linebacker
- Butch Rolle (born 1964), American football tight end
- Edward Rolle (1703–1791), English author, poet, and Anglican vicar
- Esther Rolle (1920–1998), American actress
- George Rolle (died 1552), lawyer
- Hermann Rolle (1864 -1929), German entomologist
- Johann Heinrich Rolle (1716-1785), German baroque composer.
- Magnum Rolle (born 1986), Bahamian basketball player
- Marvin Rolle (born 1983), Bahamian tennis player
- Michel Rolle (1652–1719), French mathematician
  - Rolle's theorem, in calculus
- Myron Rolle (born 1986), American football safety, Rhodes Scholar
- Randy Rolle, Bahamian politician
- Richard Rolle (1290–1349), an English religious writer, Bible translator, and hermit
- Samari Rolle (born 1976), American football cornerback

== Other uses ==
- Rolle (grape), a grape variety, also known as Vermentino
- Baron Rolle, a British peerage
- Rolle family, of Stevenstone, Devon, England

== See also ==
- Roll (disambiguation)
- Role (disambiguation)
