= Jacob Roll =

Jacob Roll may refer to:

- Jacob Roll (born 1783) (1783–1870), Norwegian judge and politician
- Jacob Roll (born 1794) (1794–1857), Norwegian miller and politician
