= Münzkirchen =

Münzkirchen Münzkira
- Municipality
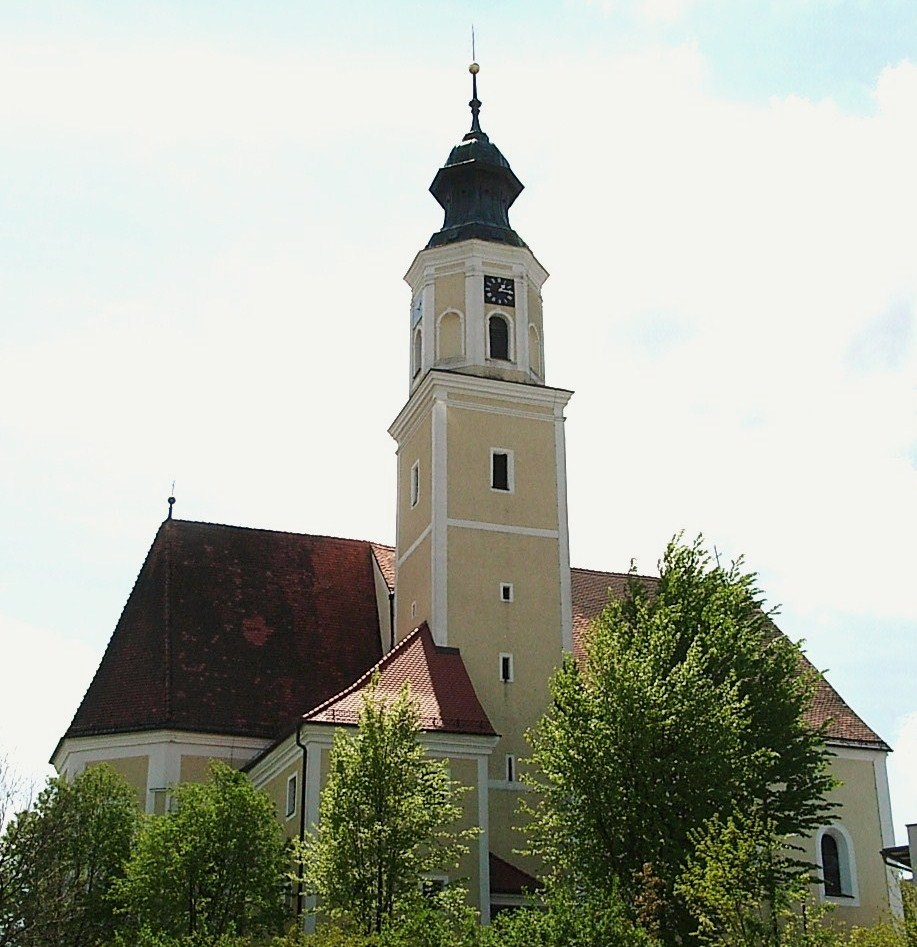

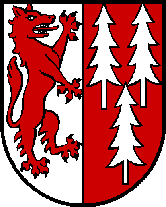
- Coat of arms

- Location within Austria
- Coordinates: 48°29′00″N 13°34′00″E
- Country: Austria
- State: Upper Austria
- District: Schärding

Government
  - Mayor: Helmut Schopf (SPÖ)

Area
  - Total: 21.07 km^{2} (8.14 sq mi)
- Elevation: 486 m (1,594 ft)

Population (2018-01-01)
  - Total: 2,572
  - Density: 122.1/km^{2} (316.2/sq mi)
- Time zone: UTC+1 (CET)
  - Summer (DST): UTC+2 (CEST)
- Postal code: 4792
- Area code: 07716
- Vehicle registration: SD
- Website: www.muenzkirchen.at

Münzkirchen (Bavarian: Münzkira) is a municipality in the district of Schärding in Upper Austria, Austria.

== Geography ==
Münzkirchen is divided into six cadastral subdivisions, namely Eisenbirn, Freundorf, Hofalt, Landertsberg, Münzkirchen and Schießdorf.

The 14 localities that belong to the municipality are Eisenbirn, Eitzenberg, Feicht, Ficht, Freundorf, Füxledt, Geibing, Hötzenberg, Landertsberg, Ludham, Prackenberg, Raad, Schießdorf and Wilhelming.

== Maria Mandl ==
Münzkirchen was the birthplace of Nazi SS concentration camp guard Maria Mandl, who was executed in 1948 for war crimes.
