= Aubrey Pankey =

American-born baritone

Aubrey Pankey in Paris, France on May 15, 1934 (photo by Teddy Piaz)

Aubrey W. Pankey (June 17, 1905 – May 8, 1971) was an American-born baritone and noted Lieder singer in 1930s Germany. In 1956 he permanently emigrated to East Germany under the growing shadow of McCarthyism together with his companion Fania Fénelon. He was the first American to sing in the People's Republic of China in 1956.

== Early life and education ==
An African-American, Pankey was born in Pittsburgh and grew up in the Hill District neighborhood. His father, who was a railroad worker, died when he was 14. His mother, Lucy Belle Pankey, who performed in a semi-amateur singing group, died a year later. He began singing at an early age in a church choir. In 1921, he enrolled in Hampton University in Virginia following in his father's footsteps. After studying mechanical engineering there for a time, he began a career in concert singing. He was mentored by composer R. Nathaniel Dett, musical director at Hampton University, who recommended him as having instinctive musical feeling. His work with Dett included touring the country performing the composer's songs.

Acclaimed tenor Roland Hayes also supported his pursuit of a career in singing. His performances were noted by The New York Times as early as 1925. He received a scholarship to study at the Oberlin Conservatory of Music in Ohio. Pankey went on to study in Boston at the Hubbard Studios and the School of Music at Boston University. He also studied voice in New York with John Alan Haughton. He worked at many jobs to support his education.

== 1930s European career ==
The positive reception of 1930 a recital he gave at Jordan Hall in Boston encouraged him to study abroad, and that year he traveled to Europe. He studied at Neues Wiener Konservatorium in Vienna under Theo Lierhaemer. A 1931 performance in Vienna drew the attention of the Austrian press. Josef Reitler wrote in the Neue Freie Presse, "He is the possessor of a musical soul, which in glowing manner is able to approach Schubert and Richard Strauss with a feeling and understanding worthy of a born German. Colorful expression is skillfully combined with a natural mellowness of voice." In the Wiener Allgemeine Zeitung Robert Konta wrote that he, "sings Schubert and Richard Strauss with an overwhelming intensity of feeling and forms them into great unforgettable experiences." going on to opine, "There are evidently black men who are messengers of culture at its greatest."

A 1933 (some sources give 1932) concert at Mozart Hall in Salzburg, Austria, was protested by Nazis. They distributed leaflets objecting to foreigners taking money out of German pockets while German musicians were starving and decrying foreigners, particularly "Negroes and Jews", for desecrating German music by singing Schubert. He was banned from singing in Germany in 1934. A tour of Italy was cancelled when he was barred from entry in 1937.

Pankey moved to Paris, France, in 1933 (some sources give 1932), where he continued his musical studies with Cesar Daniel and Charles Panzéra. He broke into French radio through an introduction by the widow of Georges Clemenceau. While in France he also worked in film as an actor. His concerts during this period were attended by notable politicians and other public figures. His performances received positive reviews in the Morgenposten of Oslo, Norway and Le Jour-Écho de Paris. He sang in English, French, German and Italian.

== Return to the US ==
Booking ad for Aubrey Pankey in Musical America from 1945

In November 1939, after six years in Paris, he returned to the United States. Pankey's New York City debut was in 1940 at Town Hall. Pankey performed at the dedication of the Sara Delano Roosevelt Memorial House in 1943. He performed a concert at Carnegie Hall in New York City produced by the National Negro Congress in 1944. His encores that evening included a march popular with Soviet troops and Die Moorsoldaten, a song of the victims of the Nazi concentration camps. He also performed at a concert for Russian war relief sponsored by the Congress of Industrial Organizations in 1944.

Pankey performed a series of three shows in 1945 to mark the opening of the United Nations Conference on International Organization. Also in 1945 Pankey performed at the Lenin Memorial Meeting at Madison Square Garden. The 1946 annual concert by The Fraternal Mandolin Symphony Orchestra of the Bronx and Brighton International Workers Organization included Pankey. He was a sponsor of the 1949 Cultural and Scientific Conference for World Peace in New York. Pankey taught voice in 1944 at the Metropolitan Music School in New York. The school was formed in 1935 to promote tolerance and racial unity and had a "mixed" (racially integrated) faculty and student body. Pankey performed at Town Hall in New York in 1946 and 1947.

=== Reception ===
His Carnegie Hall performance and another at Hunter College in 1945, where he performed his arrangement of Wade in de Water were favorably reviewed in Musical America. The New York Times reviewed the Carnegie Hall performance more critically, stating the general impression was of a "finished musicianship and an intellectual grasp of his art that his voice and his technique were inadequate to encompass." A positive review which also noted the political significance of the Carnegie Hall concert was published in The New Masses. A New York Times review of his 1942 return to Town Hall was mixed. The Times critic wrote his work was uneven and pointed to a tendency to "tighten the upper part of the short range and emit hollow, breathy tones in the lower register" but this "disappeared as if by magic, and the voice became pure and even throughout its compass." when he sang certain songs. The songs this improvement was noted on included the selection of spirituals Pankey closed the performance with and three classical pieces. Pankey's renditions of Sometimes I Feel Like a Motherless Child and Lord, I Want to Be a Christian were described as "unforgettably delivered" the latter called, "exceptionally impressive, being projected with a devotional ardor and humility that made it uncommonly moving."

Some reviews from this period in the New York Post were less positive finding a lack of strength in Pankey's voice. A 1946 performance received a negative review in The New York Sun. The critic for the Sun wrote that Pankey's reputation "rests on a rather flimsy basis of performing accomplishment. The Sun critic continued, "his potentially resonant and powerful voice might have been capable of considerable range and color under the proper training. At present the sounds he produces are often guttural and without sympathetic quality except occasionally in soft passages." The New York Times noted the audience reception for this (1946) recital was enthusiastic. A 1942 performance in Baltimore received a very positive review in The Afro-American. His 1940 New York debut received a positive to mixed review in this newspaper. The Prescott Evening Courier reported in his success in New York in 1942 stating, "No baritone got better notices than he, all last winter."

Another review in The New York Times by a different critic in 1947 was mixed. The reviewer wrote that Pankey was a refined and sensitive artist but that his voice was limited with a short range and grew "faint when any degree of swiftness is required." This criticism was tempered by noting Pankey sang with such tenderness, sincerity and "warmth of compassionate feeling" that "many of his selections were touching and all of them were pleasing, even though they were not tonally flawless." Again Pankey's singing of spirituals was praised the critic also noted, "he was also at home with the European art song." The House I Live In was described as sung with "quiet conviction and delicacy of phrasing. Paul Robeson described Pankey as, "a fine sensitive singer of wide experience, an artist of whom America can be proud."

=== International tours ===
Pankey was the first African American to represent the US as a goodwill ambassador to Latin America under the auspices of the Office of the Coordinator of Inter-American Affairs when he made an extended concert tour there in 1942. He toured Latin America again in 1945. He was the first African American to sing in Jerusalem, where a critic for the Palestine Post wrote, "His voice is dark and warm, full of the forte effects and almost mysterious in the fine pianos and pianissimos." Billboard magazine noted his popularity in Israel in 1950.

A 1947 European tour was enthusiastically received with sold-out venues and shows added. On returning from this tour, Pankey noted European interest in US race relations. He addressed the World Congress of Intellectuals for Peace in Wrocław as a guest of the Polish government during a 1948 European tour.

== Later career ==
Cover of the program for Pankey's 1955 concert in Shanghai, China

Pankey returned to Paris in 1948. He was a sponsor of the 1949 World Congress of Advocates of Peace in Paris. The US House Un-American Activities Committee asserted that Pankey was affiliated with "Communist-front organizations". In 1953 the French government refused to renew Pankey's residence permit and ordered him to leave the country. This was believed to be in connection with his participation in a protest of the execution of Julius and Ethel Rosenberg in the US. The Rosenbergs were convicted of conspiracy to commit espionage for providing information about the atomic bomb to the Soviet Union. After being refused permission to live in France and Britain, he sought permission to move to East Germany, which he was granted.

He took a job teaching at the German Music School of higher education in East Berlin in 1956. Pankey objected to being used as a political instrument based on his skin color, writing to the leadership of the Socialist Unity Party of Germany complaining that the national opera house had offered him a role based only on his "traits as a negro". A party leader, Alfred Kurella, responded stating it was time to "speak out publicly against the pseudo-sympathetic voices for negroes, behind which in reality racist attitudes are concealed." Kurella continued, "in the uncritical cult...with respect to spirituals, is hidden the same condescending and belittling attitude toward negroes."

In November 1955 (some sources give 1956), Pankey traveled to Beijing, China, as a guest of the Chinese People's Association for Cultural Relations with Foreign Countries to perform a series of recitals. He was the first American singer to perform in China since the establishment of The People's Republic in 1949. Pankey lived in East Germany from 1954 until his death. Earl Shorris wrote in a 1971 article in The New York Times that "as his ability to earn money as a singer declined" Pankey was "rumored to have maintained his standard of living by working as an agent of the state security police."

== Personal life and death ==
Pankey and Kathryn Weatherly obtained a marriage license on April 27, 1945, in New Rochelle, New York. The coverage in The Afro-American noted that Weatherly was white and recently divorced. Pankey was also divorced, having been previously married for nine years to a French woman. Weatherly was Pankey's public relations agent. They were mentioned in articles on interracial marriage in several magazines marketed towards African-Americans in the 1950s. In 1955 she was compensated by UNESCO for having been dismissed after refusing to appear before an American Loyalty Board.

Aubrey Pankey died in an automobile crash on the weekend of May 8–9, 1971, aged 65, in East Berlin. He had made over 200 appearances in 60 cities in 24 countries.

== Discography ==
- Negro-Spirituals (10-inch disc, Eterna, 1962; expanded song list in LP, Eterna, 1965)
  - Appearances as side-performer or various artists programs: additional EPs on Eterna and Amiga.
