= Rolls =

Rolls may refer to:

== People ==
- Charles Rolls (engraver) (1799–1885), engraver
- Charles Rolls (1877–1910), Welsh motoring and aviation pioneer, co-founder of Rolls-Royce Limited
- John Etherington Welch Rolls (1807–1870), British jurist and art collector
- John Rolls, 1st Baron Llangattock (1837–1912), British landowner and politician
- John Rolls, 2nd Baron Llangattock (1870–1916), British barrister and soldier
- Rolls Gracie, Brazilian jiu-jitsu fighter

== Other uses ==
- Rolls (restaurant chain), in Finland
- Rolls Razor, a British safety razor and washing machine manufacturer

== See also ==
- Rolls-Royce (disambiguation)
- Roll (disambiguation)
