= Esther Bejarano =

German concentration camp survivor (1924–2021)

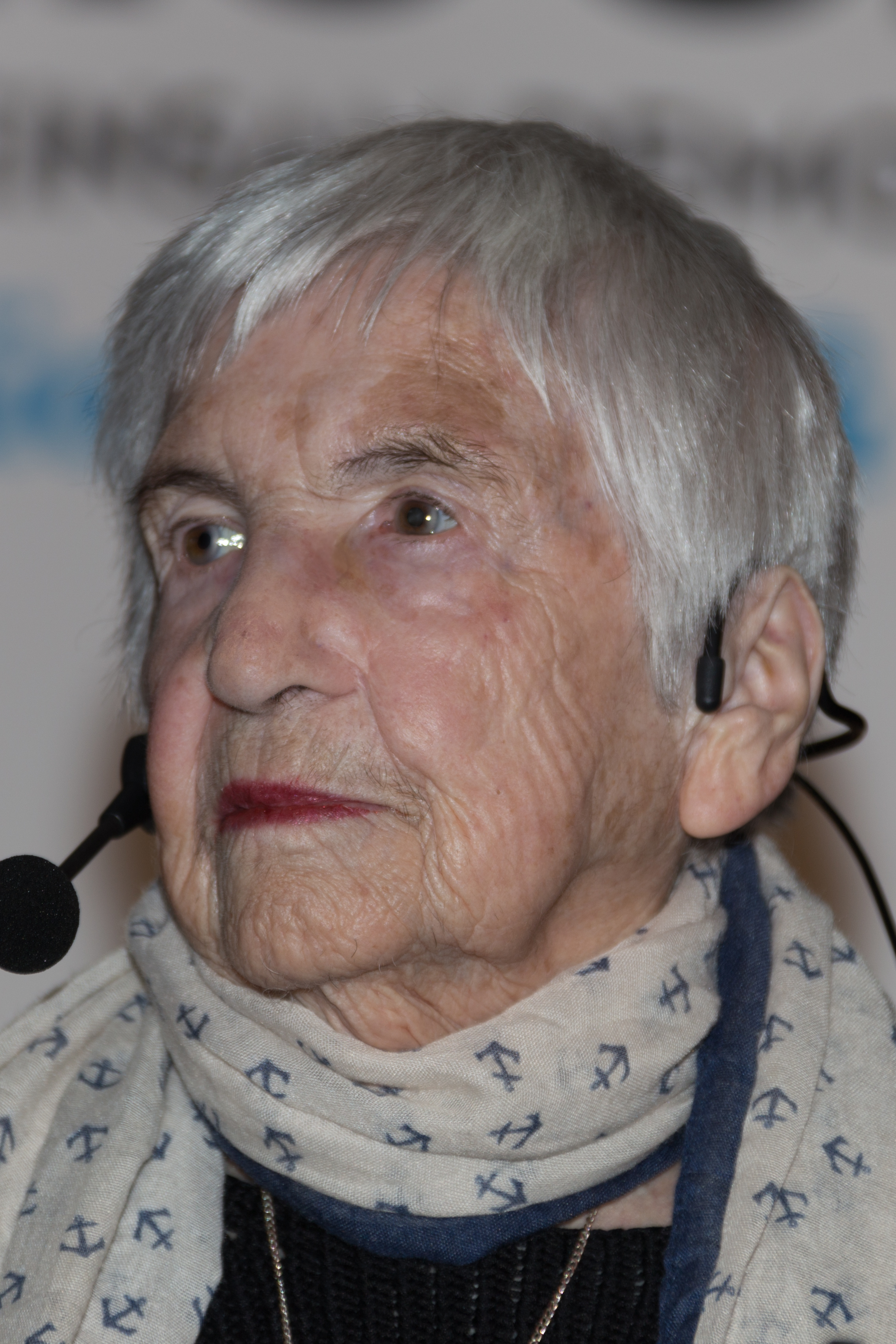
- Béjarano in 2018
- Born: Esther Löwy; 15 December 1924; Saarlouis, Territory of the Saar Basin
- Died: 10 July 2021 (aged 96); Hamburg, Germany
- Occupations: Singer; Accordion player; Activist
- Known for: Holocaust survivor who performed in the Auschwitz women's orchestra
- Awards: Carl von Ossietzky Medal; Order of Merit of the Federal Republic of Germany

Esther Béjarano (née Löwy; 15 December 1924 – 10 July 2021) was one of the last survivors of the Auschwitz concentration camp. She survived because she was a player in the Women's Orchestra of Auschwitz. She was active in various ways, including speeches and in music, in keeping the memory of the Holocaust alive. She was a regular speaker at the International Youth Meeting organised yearly at the Max Mannheimer Study Center in Dachau.

== Biography ==
Born in 1924 as Esther Löwy, she was a daughter of Margarete (Heymann) and Rudolf Loewy, the head cantor of a Jewish municipality, in Saarlouis. Her father encouraged her to get interested in music and Esther learned to play the piano. At the age of 15 she left her parents' home to make an attempt to emigrate to Palestine; the attempt was unsuccessful. She served two years of hard labour at a camp in Landwerk Neuendorf, near Fürstenwalde/Spree.

On 20 April 1943, everyone in the camp was deported to the Auschwitz concentration camp. There she had to drag stones until she volunteered to play accordion in the newly formed Women's Orchestra of Auschwitz. Until then, she had only played the piano, never the accordion. Other players included Anita Lasker-Wallfisch. The orchestra had the task, among others, to play for the daily march of the work crews passing through the camp gate.

After the war, she immigrated to Palestine on 15 September 1945 and in 1960 returned to Germany with her husband and two children. At the beginning of the 1980s, she created the musical group Coincidence, with her daughter Edna and her son Joram. They sang songs from the ghetto and in Hebrew as well as anti-fascist songs.

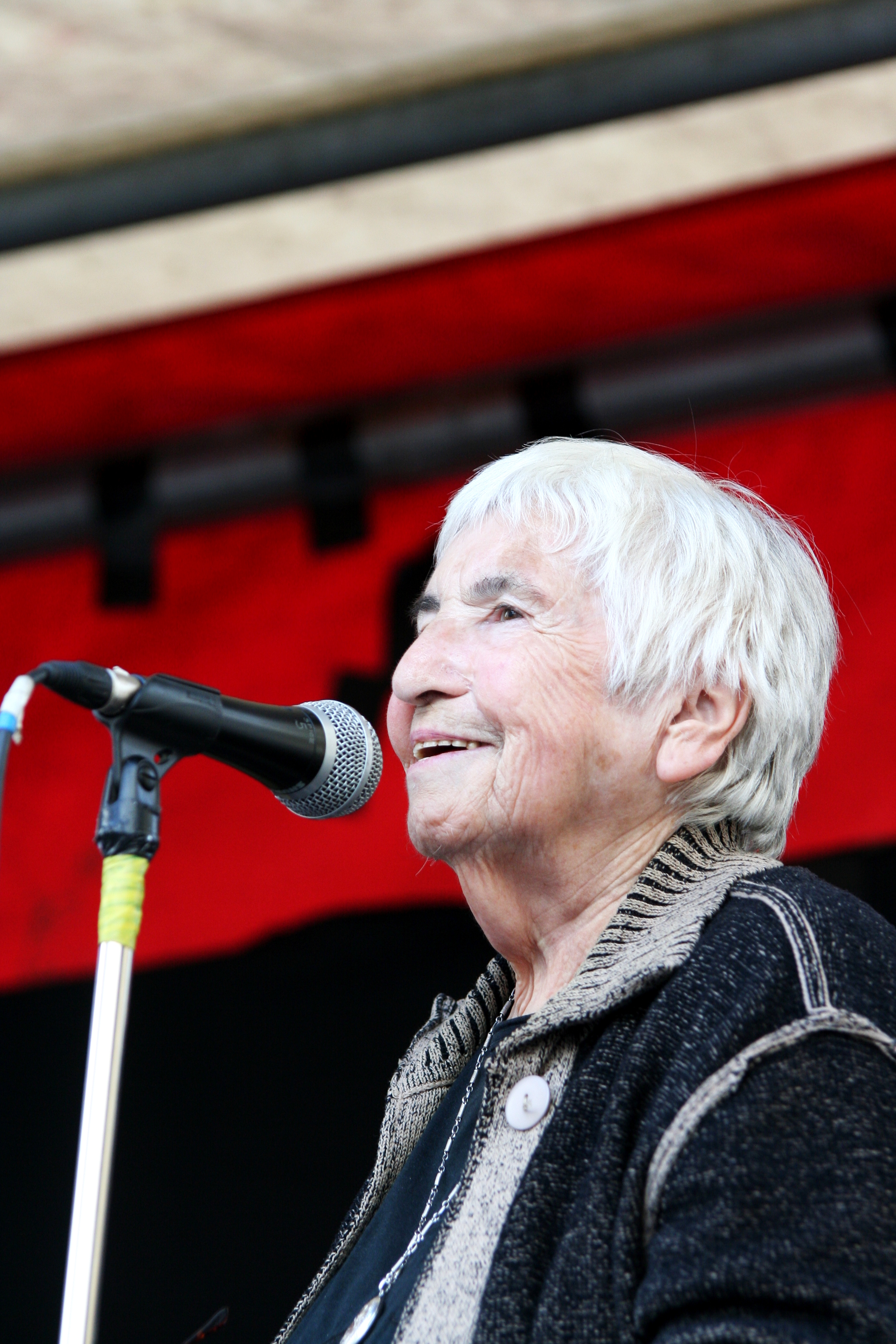
Bejarano at a rally against the National Democratic Party of Germany (NPD), in 2009

Béjarano lived in Hamburg. She was a co-founder and chairman of the International Auschwitz Committee and honorary chairperson of the Union of Persecutees of the Nazi Regime. She was active for the Committee until her death.

Béjarano died in Hamburg on 10 July 2021, aged 96. She was one of the last surviving orchestra members.

== Awards and honours ==
Béjarano was awarded the Carl von Ossietzky Medal of the Internationale Liga für Menschenrechte in 2004. In 2008, Béjarano became honorary president of the Union of Persecutees of the Nazi Regime. She received the Herbert Wehner Medal in 2010.

Béjarano held the Cross of Merit, First class, of the Order of Merit of the Federal Republic of Germany, since 2012. She was honoured with ethecon's 2013 "Blue Planet Award" for her "relentless activity for peace and against anti-Semitism, racism and fascism". In 2014, she was awarded the Giesbert Lewin Prize of the Cologne chapter of the Societies for Christian-Jewish Collaboration. She became honorary citizen of her birth town Saarlouis the same year on the occasion of her 90th birthday. In 2016, she received the Preis für Solidarität und Menschenwürde (Prize for solidarity and human dignity) of the Bündnis für Soziale Gerechtigkeit und Menschenwürde. The Senate of Hamburg awarded her the Hamburgische Ehrendenkmünze in 2019. The Gemeinschaftsschule school in Wiesloch was named after her in 2020. The same year, she was awarded the Hermann Maas Prize for her activities against racism and exclusion, and for her political commitment.

== Publications ==
- Antonella Romeo, ed. (2013). Erinnerungen. Vom Mädchenorchester in Auschwitz zur Rap-Band gegen Rechts (in German). Hamburg: Laika-Verlag. ISBN 978-3-944233-04-8.
- Lieder für das Leben. Curio-Verlag, Hamburg 1995, ISBN 3-926534-84-2.
- Man nannte mich Krümel. Curio-Verlag, Hamburg 1989, ISBN 3-926534-82-6.

== Film ==
- Esther che suonava la fisarmonica nell’orchestra di Auschwitz, Regia di Elena Valsania, Felìz – Edizioni SEB27, DVD allegato al volume: Esther Béjarano, "La ragazza con la fisarmonica. Dall’orchestra di Auschwitz alla musica Rap", A cura di Antonella Romeo, Prefazione di Bruno Maida, Edizioni SEB27, 2013; ISBN 978-88-86618-94-6
