= Helen Spitzer Tichauer =

American graphics designer, Holocaust survivor and human rights worker

- Born: November 10, 1918; Pozsony, Austro-Hungarian Kingdom
- Died: July 6, 2018 (aged 99); New York City, U.S.
- Other names: Zippi Spitzer; Helen Spitzer; Helen Iichauer; Zippi Spitzer Tichauer
- Occupations: graphics designer, human rights worker
- Known for: Holocaust survivor widely consulted by historians
- Spouse: Erwin Tichauer

Helen Tichauer (November 10, 1918 – July 6, 2018) was an American graphics designer, Holocaust survivor and human rights worker. Tichauer was born in Pozsony, Austro-Hungarian Kingdom (now Bratislava, Slovakia), as Helen Spitzer, was kidnapped by the SS, and held in death camps, in Poland, lived in displaced persons camps in Germany, after the war. It was there that she married Erwin Tichauer, then the chief of security of her camp. The Tichauer were called upon by the United Nations on multiple humanitarian projects. Erwin Tichauer also served as a professor of bio-engineering, at University of New South Wales and New York University.

== SS Detention ==
Tichauer was one of the first women sent to Auschwitz in early 1942. Eventually Auschwitz camp authorities discovered Tichauer's skills as a graphics designer, which preserved her from being killed, and even allowed her relatively free-run of the camp, and even occasional excursions, outside the camp. Multiple historians have used Tichauer's account of life in Auschwitz. Konrad Kwiet contributed a biography of Tichauer as a chapter of Approaching an Auschwitz Survivor.

Tichauer played mandolin in the Women's Orchestra of Auschwitz, assembled to meet trains of individuals destined to go straight to the gas chambers. The orchestra would play calming music so captives who did not know they were about to die would be more tractable.

In December 2019 The New York Times published an article on a previously undocumented aspect of her life in Auschwitz - 25 year old Tichauer had taken a 17 year old lover in Auschwitz, David Wisnia. The pair had been able to engage in monthly liaisons, and had planned to meet, and marry, if they should survive the war. However, they lost track of one another, for several years, and, when they had news of one another, they were both married.

Camp authorities tried to evacuate the camp, and destroy evidence of their crimes, as the armies of the Soviet Union approached. Tichauer and a friend were able escape from their guards during a death march to another camp.

In her PhD thesis Anna-Madeleine Halkes Carey described Tichauer as a holocaust survivor whose multiple accounts of the camp system had been thoroughly confirmed.

== Post-war displaced person ==
She married Erwin Tichauer, chief of security at the Feldafing displaced persons camp. According to The New York Times Tichauer was vague about efforts she made to help refugees with limited travel documents to make their way to Israel, and other safer places.

== United Nations projects, and life with Erwin Tichauer ==
The Tichauers participated in United Nations' projects in Peru, Bolivia and Indonesia. According to The New York Times "Throughout their travels, Ms. Tichauer continued to learn new languages and use her design skills to help populations in need, particularly pregnant women and new mothers." The Tichauers never had children.

Erwin Tichauer was an academic, a professor of bio-engineering, at the University of New South Wales, and New York University. Tichauer lived with him until his death in 1996.

History professor Konrad Kwiet, who had survived World War 2 as a child, said Tichauer served as a mother-figure for him, and phoned her once a week, after she left Sydney.

== Relationship with David Wisnia ==
Wisnia's first job, at Auschwitz, was to retrieve the bodies of captives who committed suicide by electrocuting themselves by throwing themselves at the camp's electrified fences. Guards who learned he was a skilled singer started calling upon him to sing to them, and he was later transferred to work as a bathroom attendant in the sauna operated for the guard force.

Tichauer met him there, and was able to use her position of trust to arrange privacy for their liaisons. The pair agreed to try and meet, if they should both survive the war.

Wisnia did not tell his children and grandchildren he had a lover, while in Auschwitz, and Tichauer did not tell her biographers. The New York Times described Wisnia and Tichauer having a final meeting, near the end of her life. Wisnia was able to ask her whether she had used her position of trust to help him survive the death camp, and she confirmed that she had been able to prevent him being shipped to an extermination camp on five occasions.
