= Roles (surname) =

The surname Roles was first found in Yorkshire where they were undertenants in the honor of Richmond being descended from the distinguished Norman family of Rollos of Roullours in Calvados, arrondissement of Dieppe, in Normandy. A century later it appears that William de Rollos, Lord of Bourne in the county of Lincoln to the south, was also a branch of this distinguished family. Notable people with the surname include:

- Albie Roles (1921–2012), English footballer
- Barbara Roles (born 1941), American figure skater
- Jack Roles (born 1999), English footballer
- Natalie Roles (born 1968), former English actress
- Philippa Roles (1978–2017), Welsh discus thrower

== See also ==
- Role (sociology term)
- Role (disambiguation)
- Roles or Rholes, Getae chieftain in Scythia Minor
- Rolesville, North Carolina, named after William H. Roles
