= Women's Orchestra of Auschwitz =

Female orchestra at Auschwitz concentration camp

Auschwitz Women's Orchestra
- Mädchenorchester von Auschwitz
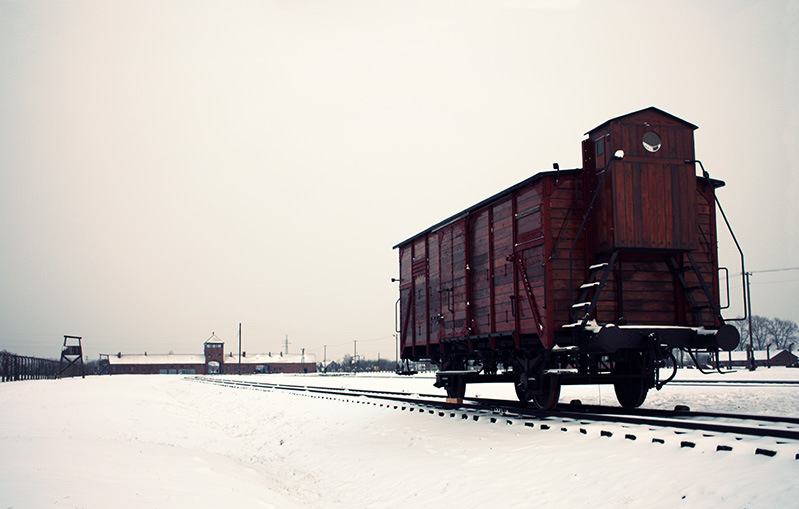
- Auschwitz II-Birkenau extermination camp
- Type: Prison orchestra
- Location: Auschwitz II-Birkenau, Brzezinka, German-occupied Poland
- Coordinates: 50°02′09″N 19°10′42″E
- Period: April 1943 – October 1944
- Conductors: Zofia Czajkowska; Alma Rosé; Sonia Winogradowa
- Notable players: Esther Béjarano; Helena Dunicz-Niwińska; Fania Fénelon; Claire Monis; Hélène Rounder; Anita Lasker-Wallfisch; Helen Spitzer Tichauer

The Women's Orchestra of Auschwitz (Mädchenorchester von Auschwitz; lit. "Girls' Orchestra of Auschwitz") was formed by order of the SS in 1943, during the Holocaust, in the Auschwitz II-Birkenau extermination camp in German-occupied Poland. Active for 18 months—from April 1943 until October 1944—the orchestra consisted of mostly young female Jewish and Slavic prisoners, of varying nationalities, who would rehearse for up to ten hours a day to play music regarded as helpful in the daily running of the camp. They also held a concert every Sunday for the SS.

A member of the orchestra, Fania Fénelon, published her experiences as an autobiography, Sursis pour l'orchestre (1976), which appeared in English as Playing for Time (1977). The book was the basis of a television film of the same name in 1980, written by Arthur Miller.

== Formation ==
The orchestra was formed in April 1943 by SS-Oberaufseherin Maria Mandl, supervisor of the women's camp in Auschwitz, and SS-Hauptsturmführer Franz Hössler, the women's camp commandant. The Germans wanted a propaganda tool for visitors and camp newsreels and a tool to boost camp morale. Led at first by a Polish music teacher, Zofia Czajkowska, the orchestra remained small until Jews were admitted in May 1943. Its members came from many countries, including Austria, Belgium, Czechoslovakia, France, Germany, Greece, Hungary, Poland, the Netherlands and USSR.

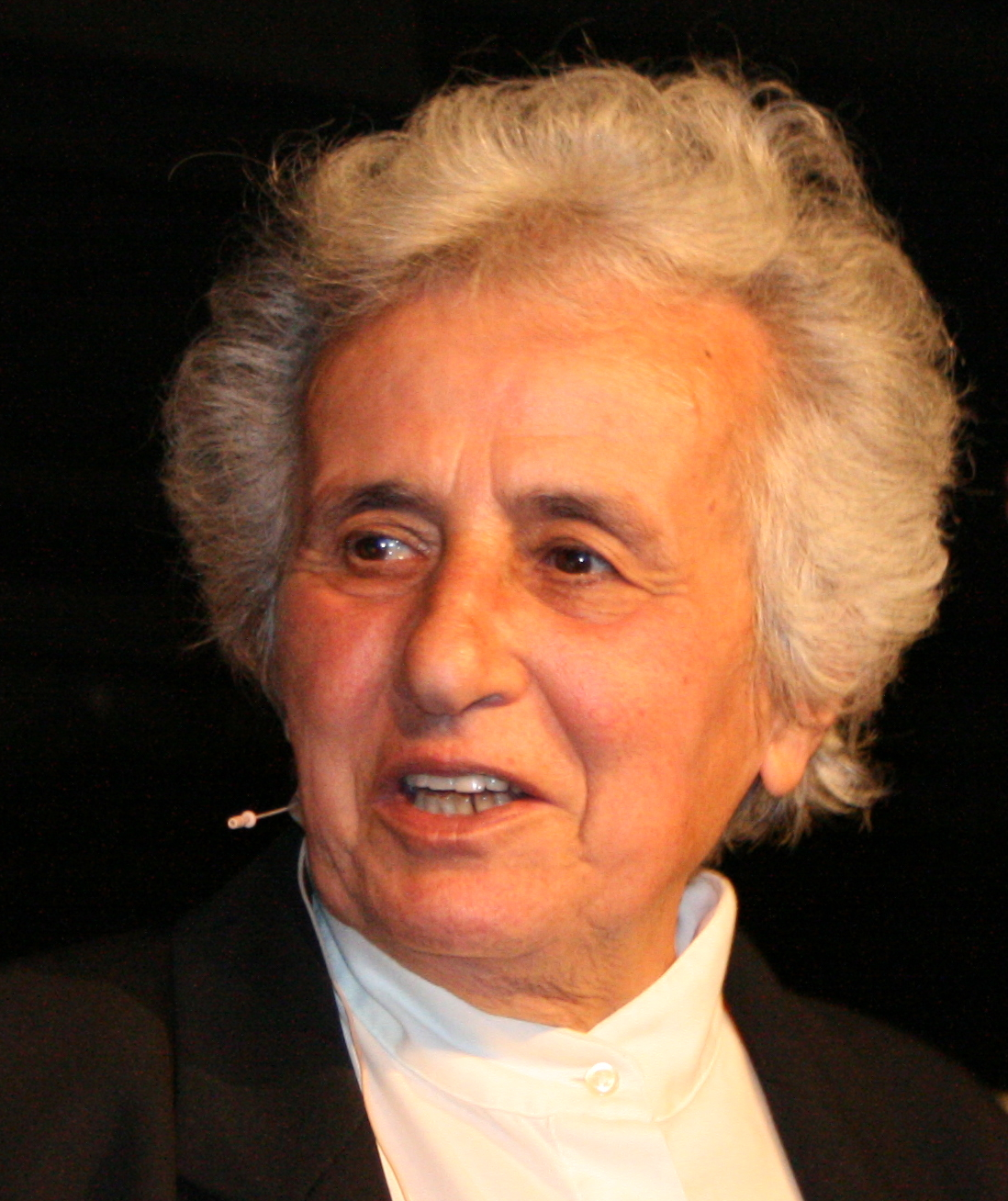
Anita Lasker-Wallfisch, cellist

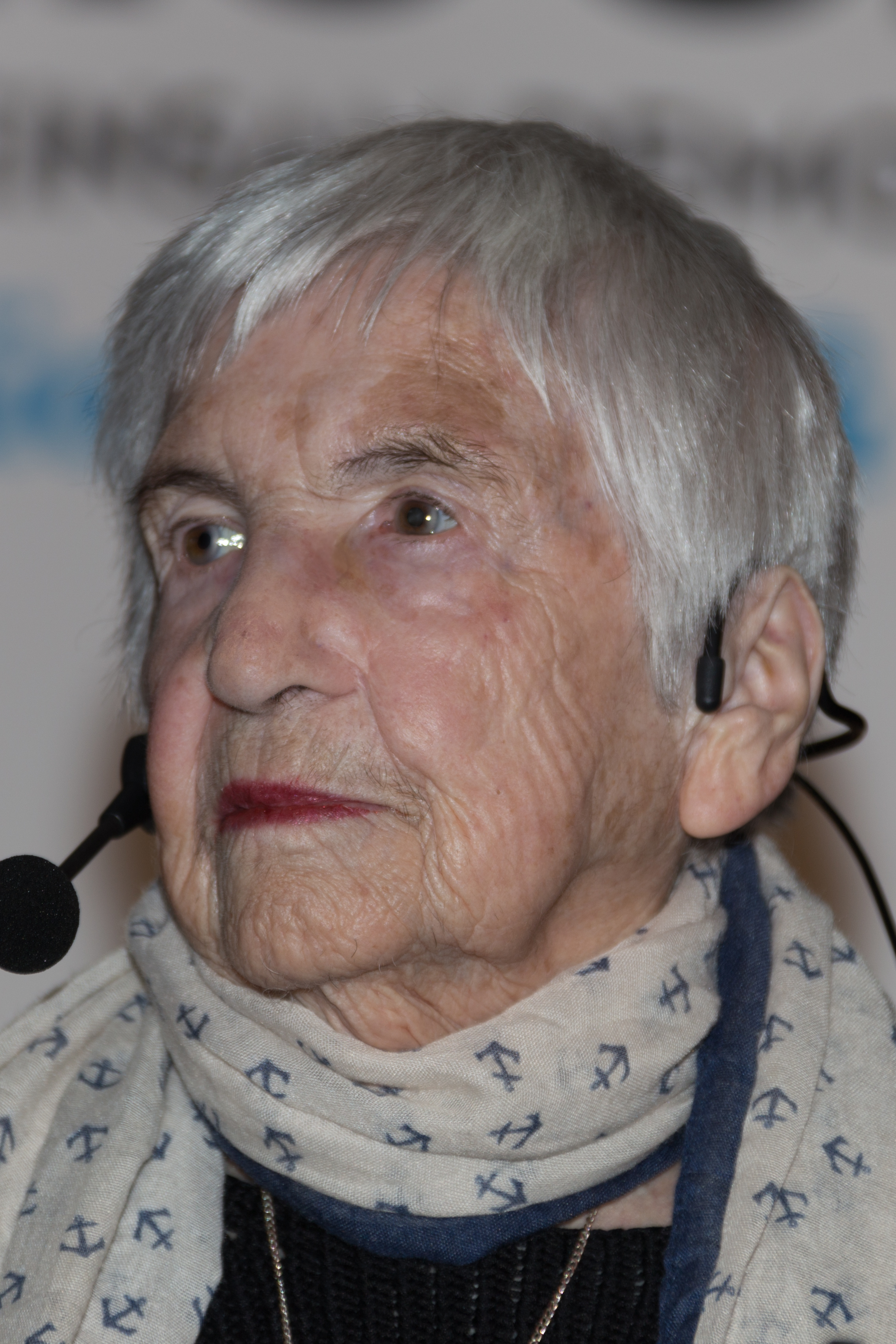
Esther Béjarano, pianist, accordion player, singer

According to professor of music Susan Eischeid, the orchestra had 20 members by June 1943; by 1944 it had 42–47 players and three to four musical copyists. Its primary role was to play (often for hours on end in all weather conditions) at the gate of the women's camp when the work gangs left and returned. They might also play during "selection" and in the infirmary. (Note: Music and the Holocaust (website): "In June 1943 the orchestra began their primary assignment of playing at the camp gate for the arrival and departure of the female work commandos. The musicians had to arrive at their positions at the entrance of camp early, in order to set up, and stayed late. They were also not freed from normal work assignments, nor were they released from musical duty in rain or bad weather. As they had a very small number of pieces which they were equipped to play, they would simply repeat them over and over as the rows of women prisoners marched by, sometimes playing for several hours. They also played for sick prisoners in the infirmary, and were sometimes assigned to play when new transports arrived, or during selections.")

In the early months, the ensemble consisted mainly of amateur musicians, with a string section, accordions and a mandolin; it lacked a bass section. The orchestra acquired its limited instruments and sheet music from the men's orchestra of the main Auschwitz camp. The repertoire of the orchestra was fairly limited, in terms of the available sheet music, the knowledge of the conductor and the wishes of the SS. It played mostly German marching songs, as well as the Polish folk and military songs that Czajkowska knew. It included two professional musicians, cellist Anita Lasker-Wallfisch, and vocalist/pianist Fania Fénelon, each of whom wrote memoirs of their time in the orchestra. Wallfisch, for example, recollected being told to play Schumann's Träumerei for Josef Mengele.

== Conductors ==
The first conductor, Zofia Czajkowska, a Polish music teacher, was active from April 1943 until she was replaced by Alma Rosé, an Austrian-Jewish violinist, in August that year. The daughter of Arnold Rosé, leader of the Vienna Philharmonic Orchestra, and niece of Gustav Mahler, Rosé had been the conductor of the Wiener Walzermädeln, a small orchestra in Vienna, and had arrived in Auschwitz from the Drancy internment camp in Paris.

By January 1944, the orchestra had 47 members, including five singers. Rosé died suddenly on 5 April 1944, possibly from food poisoning, after having dinner with a kapo. The third conductor was Sonia Winogradowa, a Ukrainian pianist. For several reasons, including reduced rehearsal time and Winogradowa's lack of experience, the orchestra's performance declined. It stopped performing in October 1944.

== Move to Bergen-Belsen ==
On 1 November 1944, the Jewish members of the women's orchestra were evacuated by cattle car to the Bergen-Belsen concentration camp in Germany, where there was neither orchestra nor special privileges. Three members, Charlotte "Lola" Croner, Julie Stroumsa and Else, were murdered there. On 18 January 1945, non-Jewish women in the orchestra, including several Poles, were evacuated to Ravensbrück concentration camp. Fénelon was interviewed by the BBC on 15 April 1945, the day of Bergen-Belsen's liberation by British troops, and sang "La Marseillaise" and "God Save the King".

== Books ==
The best known publication about the orchestra is Fania Fénelon's memoir, Playing for Time (1977), first published in Paris as Sursis pour l'orchestre (1976). The memoir and subsequent TV adaptation assumed an important place in Holocaust scholarship. This was a source of frustration to other survivors of the orchestra, who disagreed with Fénelon's representation of the orchestra, particularly her portrayal of Alma Rosé and several other musicians, and the diminishment by Fénelon of their bond and support for one another. Fénelon presents Rosé as a cruel disciplinarian and self-hating Jew who admired the Nazis and courted their favor. A biography, Alma Rosé: From Vienna to Auschwitz (2000), by Rosé family friend Richard Newman and Karen Kirtley, presents a different picture.

The most recent book, written to mark the 80th anniversary of the liberation of the camps and published in 2025, is The Women’s Orchestra of Auschwitz: A story of Survival, by Anne Sebba.

== List of members ==
Listed alphabetically by birth name or by first name where no surname is known.

=== Conductors ===
- Zofia Czajkowska, Polish music teacher, first conductor, conducted until August 1943.
- Alma Rosé, violin, Austrian, second conductor, died 5 April 1944.
- Sonia Winogradowa, copyist, piano, voice, Ukrainian, third conductor.

=== Players ===
- Margot Anzenbacher (later Větrovcová), guitar, Czech
- Lilly Assael, Jewish, Greek
- Yvette Assael (later Lennon), Greek
- Stefania Baruch, music teacher, played guitar and mandolin
- Esther Lowey Béjarano (Sarah Weiss), pianist, singer, accordion
- Zofia Cykowiak (Zocha Nowak), Polish
- Henryka Czapla, Polish
- Helena Dunicz-Niwińska (Halina Opielka), violin, Polish, Nr. 64118, author of One of the Girls in the Band: The Memoirs of a Violinist from Birkenau (2014)
- Fania Fénelon, piano and voice, French, Nr. 74862 author of Sursis pour l'orchestre (1976).
- Henryka Gałązka, violin, Polish
- Marta Goldstein
- Hilde Grünbaum
- Danuta Kollakowa, drums, piano, Polish
- Fanny Kornblum (later Birkenwald)
- Marie Kroner (murdered in Auschwitz)
- Regina Kupferberg (later Rivka Bacia), Jewish
- Irena Łagowska, Polish
- Maria Langenfeld, Polish
- Anita Lasker-Wallfisch (Marta Goldstein), cello, Jewish
- Lotta Lebedová, Jewish from Bohemia.
- Kazimiera Małys
- Lily Mathé,(fr), Hungarian
- Elsa Miller (later Felstein), violin, Belgian, Jewish
- Claire Monis, French (fr)
- Maria Moś-Wdowik, Polish
- Hélène Rounder
- Hélène Scheps (Irène Szal)
- Helga Schiessel, piano, Jewish, German
- Ruth Schiessel, Jewish, German
- Flora Schrijver-Jacobs
- Violette Jacquet Silberstein (Florette Fenet) violin, violin, Jewish, born in Romania
- Helen Spitzer Tichauer
- Eva Steiner (Ewa Stern), Transylvania [present-day Romania], Jewish, singer
- Madam Steiner, mother of Eva, Transylvania [present-day Romania], Jewish, violinist
- Ewa Stojowska, Polish
- Ioulia "Julie" Stroumsa, Jewish, Greek (murdered in Bergen-Belsen)
- Szura, guitar, Ukraine
- Carla Wagenberg, Tamar Berger, Jewish, German, sister of Sylvia Wagenberg
- Sylvia Wagenberg, Jewish, German
- Irena Walaszczyk
- Jadwiga Zatorska, violin, Polish
- Rachela Zelmanowicz-Olewski, mandolin, Jewish, Poland
