= Helena Dunicz-Niwińska =

Polish violinist (1915–2018)

- Born: 28 July 1915; Lwów
- Died: 12 June 2018 (aged 102)
- Occupation: musician
- Known for: Auschwitz survivor

Helena Dunicz-Niwińska (28 July 1915 – 12 June 2018) was a Polish violinist, translator and author.

Born in Vienna, she grew up in Lwów, where she lived with her parents and brothers until 1943. She started playing the violin at the age of ten in the Lwów conservatory of the Polish Musical Society and continued with pedagogical studies undertaken in the years 1934–1939.

After the outbreak of World War II, she remained in Lwów and was arrested there along with her mother in 1943 and spent 9 months in prison. In October of the same year she was deported to the Auschwitz-Birkenau concentration camp. As a violinist, she was included in the camp's orchestra, under Alma Rosé.

Together with the orchestra, she performed both during the daily camp events and on special evening concerts for SS personnel, where the works of Edvard Grieg, Robert Schumann and Wolfgang Amadeus Mozart were performed. She performed in the Birkenau camp orchestra until October 1944 then she was evacuated to Ravensbrück and then Neustadt-Glewe, where she was liberated in 1945.

After the liberation, she went to Krakow. Until 1975 she worked as a deputy head of the editorial office of publishing houses for music education at the Polish Music Publishers. She was the author of translations of professional literature. She died on 12 June 2018, at the age of 102.
