= Roll call =

Roll call may refer to:

== Noting attendance ==
- A taking of attendance as part of a meeting agenda
- A voting method in a deliberative assembly
- Roll call (policing), a briefing to take attendance and for other purposes

== Arts, entertainment and media ==
- Roll Call, an American newspaper focusing on news from Capitol Hill and Congress
- Roll Call (album), 1961
- Roll Call (novel), in the Traces series by Malcolm Rose
- Roll Call (film), a 1965 Soviet drama film
- The Roll Call, an 1874 painting by Elizabeth Thompson
- The Roll-Call, a 1918 novel in the Clayhanger Family series by Arnold Bennett
- "Real Nigga Roll Call", or Roll Call, a 2004 song by Lil Jon featuring Ice Cube
- The Roll-Call, English title of the 1970 Polish animated short film by Ryszard Czekała, Apel

== Other uses ==
- SS Roll Call, an 1875 ship, later SS Laura
- Roll Call Records, an American independent record label

== See also ==
- Appellplatz (German, literally 'roll call place'), in Nazi concentration camps
- Assembly (bugle call)
