= Zofia Czajkowska =

Polish musician

Zofia Czajkowska (4 August 1905 – April 1978) was a Polish musician chosen to be the first conductor of the Women's Orchestra of Auschwitz.

Czajkowska had been a music teacher, prior to her arrest as a political prisoner. According to Susan Eischeid, author of The Truth about Fania Fénelon and the Women’s Orchestra of Auschwitz-Birkenau. Czajkowska was regarded by many as an "unexceptional musician", which caused problems with the development of the orchestra. Like the other musicians in the orchestra, Czajkowska was a captive, whose service in the orchestra helped prevent them from being murdered. In July 1943 Alma Rosé, a talented musician, and niece of Gustav Mahler, arrived in the camp and took over leading the orchestra. Czajkowska served as Rosé's lieutenant.
