= Alma Rosé =

Austrian violist (1906–1944)

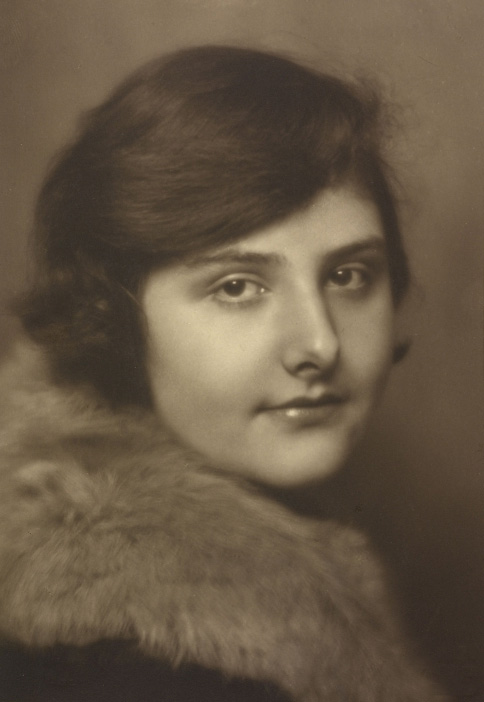
- Rosé before March 1927
- Born: 3 November 1906; Vienna, Austria-Hungary
- Died: 4/5 April 1944 (aged 37); Auschwitz-Birkenau
- Occupations: Violinist; conductor
- Spouse: Váša Příhoda (m. 1930; div. 1935)
- Father: Arnold Rosé
- Relatives: Alfred Rosé (brother); Gustav Mahler (uncle); Alma Mahler (aunt)
- Musical career
- Instrument: Violin

Alma Maria Rosé (3 November 1906 – 4/5 April 1944) was an Austrian violinist and conductor. In July 1943, Rosé was deported to Auschwitz-Birkenau. Rosé directed the Women's Orchestra of Auschwitz and was the Kapo of the music block.

== Early years ==
Alma Rosé was born on 3 November 1906 in Vienna, Austria-Hungary (present-day, Austria) to Arnold Rosé, a violinist, and Justine Rosé-Mahler. Rosé's older brother was the composer and conductor Alfred Rosé. The Rosé family were secular Jews.

Through her mother Rosé was the niece of Gustav Mahler and Alma Mahler.

== Career ==
On 29 July 1922, at age 15, Rosé made her violin soloist debut. In 1932 she founded the woman's orchestra, Die Wiener Walzermädeln (The Waltzing Girls of Vienna). The concertmistress was Anny Kux, a friend. The ensemble played to a very high standard, undertaking concert tours in Austria, Germany, Czechoslovakia, and Poland.

== Persecution ==
In 1938, following the annexation of Austria into Nazi Germany, Rosé and her father fled to London. She went on her own to the Netherlands where she believed she could resume her musical career.

When the Germans occupied the Netherlands, she was trapped. A fictitious marriage to a Dutch engineer named August van Leeuwen Boomkamp did not protect her; nor did her nominal status as a Christian convert. She fled to France, but in late 1942 when she tried to escape to neutral Switzerland, she was arrested by the Gestapo. After several months in the internment camp of Drancy, she was deported in July 1943 to the concentration camp at Auschwitz.

=== Auschwitz ===
Upon arrival in Auschwitz, Rosé was quarantined and became very ill, but eventually recovered. She assumed leadership of the Mädchenorchester von Auschwitz (Girls Orchestra of Auschwitz). The orchestra had been in existence before Rosé's arrival, a pet project of SS-Oberaufseherin ("SS chief supervisor") Maria Mandl. Before Rosé, the orchestra was conducted by Zofia Czajkowska, a Polish teacher. The ensemble consisted mainly of amateur musicians, with a string section, but also accordions, percussion, guitars, flute, recorder and mandolins, but lacked a brass section. Singers and music-copyists rounded-out the membership of the Music Block. The orchestra's primary function was to play at the main gate each morning and evening as the prisoners left for and returned from their work assignments; the orchestra also gave weekend concerts for the prisoners and the SS and entertained at SS functions.

Rosé conducted, orchestrated and sometimes played violin solos during its concerts. Apart from the official activity, she had the band rehearse and play forbidden music by Polish and Jewish composers to boost the spirits of band members and fellow inmates they trusted. She herself orchestrated Fryderyk Chopin's Etude in E major, Op. 10, No. 3 and combined it with the lyrics she wrote. The conductor's strict and perfectionistic teaching style helped mold the orchestra into an excellent ensemble, all of whose members survived during her tenure, and after her death, all except two (Lola Kroner and Julie Stroumsa) would live to see the end of the war. Rosé instructed orchestra members that they would "survive together or die together. There was no halfway road".

Rosé died, aged 37, of a sudden illness at the camp, possibly food poisoning. During this illness, Josef Mengele signed an order for spinal tap on Rosé. The orchestra included several professional musicians, cellist Anita Lasker-Wallfisch and vocalist/pianist Fania Fénelon, each of whom wrote memoirs of their time in the orchestra, but also Claire Monis and Hélène Rounder, who both survived as well. Fénelon's account, Playing for Time, was made into a television film of the same name, and was decried by orchestra survivors as being misleading, and containing preposterous distortions of the truth.

== Personal life ==
In 1930, Rosé married the Czech violinist Váša Příhoda, before later divorcing in 1935.

== Legacy ==
Her experiences in the camp were depicted in Playing for Time.

Exilarte, the center for recovery, preservation and reintegration of music suppressed by National Socialism, decdicated its first concert in 2006 to Alma Rosé. Another concert dedicated to the musician took place on January 27th, 2026 in the Palais Ehrbar in Vienna, performing compositions by Gideon Klein, Viktor Ullmann, Hans Gál and Erwin Schulhoff.

The Alma Rosé Quartett was founded in autumn of 2022.

== Recordings ==
Arnold Rosé's performances together with Alma were eventually released on CD.

== See also ==
- Alice Herz-Sommer

== Theater ==
- Claudio Tomati: Alma Rosé Sedizioni a Teatro (2006); ISBN 88-89484-07-1
