= Hélène Rounder =

French activist (1922–1972)

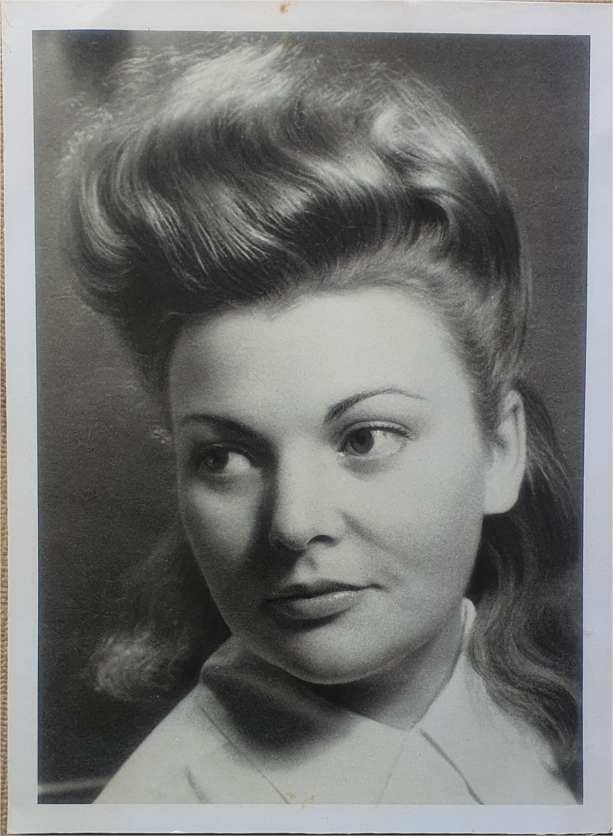
- Rounder in 1949
- Born: 15 February 1922; Paris, France
- Died: 14 April 1972 (aged 50); Marseille, France
- Occupation: Member of the French Resistance
- Years active: 1940–1945
- Known for: Being a violinist for the Women's Orchestra of Auschwitz

Hélène Rounder-Diatkin (15 February 1922 – 14 April 1972) was a member of the French Resistance against the Nazi occupation of France during World War II. After being caught and imprisoned, she became a member of the Women's Orchestra of Auschwitz.

== Early life ==
Rounder was born on 15 February 1922 in the 12th arrondissement of Paris, to Wessan "Max" Rounder (1890–1942) and Léja "Louise" Ber (1892–1942), Jewish immigrants who had moved to France at the beginning of the 20th century from Poland and Russia, respectively, and had married in 1933. Rounder and her older sister Marie (1913–2000) were raised first on rue des Ternes in the 17th arrondissement, and later on rue de Châtillon in Montrouge; the family also spent some time living in Royan in western France. Rounder's parents ran a tailor shop on rue Championnet in the 18th arrondissement.

== Activism ==
=== Student activism ===
In 1937, at the age of 15, Rounder began writing in the children's letters section of the leftist newspaper L'Humanité. After beginning her studies at the University of Paris Faculty of Humanities, she became an active member of the Communist Students' Association. On 11 November 1940, Rounder participated in a demonstration held at the Arc de Triomphe to commemorate the 22nd anniversary of the Armistice of 11 November 1918 which formally ended World War I.

On 27 November 1940, Rounder was arrested by officers from the Special Brigades as part of a wave of arrests following the discovery of communist leaflets hidden in library books; other activists arrested at the time included Jean Commère, Pierre Kast, Raymond Guglielmo and Pierre Daix. Rounder was detained at La Roquette Prison until 2 March 1941, when she was charged by the 15th Chamber of the Court of First Instance with "communist propaganda" and sentenced to three months' imprisonment; she was released the same day, having already served that time in pretrial detention.

After her release from prison, Rounder resumed her resistance activities. On 18 June 1942, Special Brigades officers arrested André Diez and Yvonne Picard, whom they had been surveilling since March 1942 due to suspicions he was printing and distributing communist leaflets. Rounder's name was found in documents belonging to Diez, and she was one of around 60 people who were subsequently arrested due to being identified as having links to Diez and Picard.

=== Imprisonment at Auschwitz ===
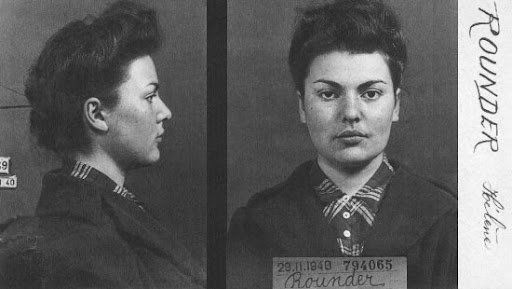
Rounder after being arrested in 1940

Rounder was detained at Fresnes Prison until 3 August 1942, when she was moved to Fort de Romainville, a Nazi transit camp. On 1 September, after Rounder was identified as being Jewish, she was separated from the communist activists and was transferred to Drancy internment camp, where she remained until 18 July 1943. During her time at Drancy, Rounder worked as a teacher and writing registration cards for newly interned prisoners. On 18 July 1943, Rounder was deported on convoy 57 from Bobigny station to Auschwitz, where she was tattooed with registration number 50290.

Rounder survived by being recruited to join the Women's Orchestra of Auschwitz as a violinist, alongside fellow French prisoners Claire Monis and Fanny Ruback. In the orchestra, she was known as "la petite Hélène" (lit. 'Little Hélène'). On 31 October 1944, the orchestra were moved to Bergen-Belsen concentration camp, arriving on 2 November. Rounder remained at the camp until it was liberated on 15 April 1945 by the British Army.

Rounder was subsequently repatriated back to Paris, suffering from scurvy, where she resided with her sister Marie in Seine-et-Marne. She subsequently learned that her mother had died of cancer on 28 March 1942 in Paris, while her father had been arrested during the Vel' d'Hiv roundup in July 1942 and deported to Auschwitz on convoy 7 on 19 July; he was murdered after arriving at Auschwitz on 24 July. The family's business had been Aryanised.

== Post-war life ==
After World War II, Rounder joined the French Army for a brief period, serving as a translator and writer for the agriculture and supply division in Berlin. In 1952, she completed her degree in literature, which she had started in 1941 prior to her imprisonment. Between 1950 and 1953, Rounder worked as a bilingual secretary for the Centre international de l'enfance, and spent a period working in Brazzaville.

Rounder married in 1955 and moved to the Cité radieuse in Marseille; they had no children. She subsequently obtained a degree in English from the University of Aix-en-Provence. While Rounder kept a violin in her possession, she stated that she no longer played it, preferring to play the harmonica. She remained close friends with Violette Jacquet-Silberstein, a fellow member of the Auschwitz orchestra who lived in Cassis. Rounder supported the twinning of Marseille with the Israeli city of Haifa.

Rounder died on 14 April 1972 of breast cancer. Her name was later engraved on the Wall of Names at the Mémorial de la Shoah in Paris.
