= Fania Fénelon =

French musician and writer (1908–1983)

Fania Fénelon (née Fanja Goldstein; 2 September 1908 – 19 December 1983) was a French pianist, composer and cabaret singer whose 1976 memoir, Sursis pour l'orchestre, about survival in the Women's Orchestra of Auschwitz during the Holocaust was adapted as the 1980 television film, Playing for Time.

== Early and personal life ==
Fanja Goldstein was born in Paris in 1908 to a Jewish father and a Catholic mother. Her father, Jules Goldstein, was an engineer in the rubber industry. She had two brothers, Leonide and Michel Goldstein, both of whom also survived the war. Her marriage to Silvio Perla (a Swiss athlete, specialist in the 5000-metre run) ended in divorce, which was finalized after the war.

She attended the Conservatoire de Paris, where she studied under Germaine Martinelli, obtaining a first prize in piano (despite her diminutive size and very small hands) and at the same time worked nights, singing in bars.

== Holocaust survivor and post-war activities ==
During the Second World War, she joined the French Resistance in 1940 until her arrest and deportation to Auschwitz-Birkenau, where she was a pianist and soprano in the Women's Orchestra of Auschwitz, then to Bergen-Belsen, until she was freed in 1945. Suffering from a potentially fatal case of typhus and weighing only 65 pounds, she sang for the BBC on the day of her liberation by British troops. (A Library of Congress entry for this recording gives her name as Fanja Perla, her married name at the time; her divorce from Perla was finalized after the war.)

Under her pseudonym of "Fénelon", which she took up after the war, Goldstein became a well known cabaret singer. In 1966 she went with her African-American life-partner, baritone singer Aubrey Pankey, to East Berlin. After Pankey's death she returned to France. From 1973 to 1975, with Marcelle Routier, she wrote Sursis pour l'orchestre, a book about her experiences, based on the diary she kept at the concentration camps. It dealt with the degrading compromises survivors had to make, the black humor of inmates who would sometimes laugh hysterically over gruesome sights, the religious and national tensions among inmates (e.g. between the Jewish musicians and the Poles, some of whom were anti-Semitic), and the normality of prostitution and lesbian relationships. At Birkenau, Fénelon served as a pianist, one of the two main singers, an occasional arranger of musical pieces, and even a temporary drummer, when the original drummer briefly took ill.

All of the orchestra members survived the war, except two players, Lola Kroner and Julie Stroumsa, and conductor Alma Rosé who died of a sudden illness, possibly food poisoning, at the camp. Most of the other survivors, particularly Anita Lasker-Wallfisch and Violette Jacquet-Silberstein, disagreed with Fénelon's negative portrayal of Rosé, who, although Jewish, had been given the equivalent status of a kapo. The book was translated into German and English in slightly abridged editions.

=== Death ===
Fania Fénelon died on 19 December 1983, aged 75, in a Paris hospital. The causes of death were listed as cancer and heart disease. She was survived by her brothers, Leonide Goldstein, a professor of psychiatry at the University of Medicine and Dentistry of New Jersey, and Michel Goldstein, a retired businessman in Paris.

== In popular culture ==
Linda Yellen filmed Playing for Time using as script a dramatic adaptation by Arthur Miller. Fénelon bitterly opposed Miller's and Yellen's purportedly sanitized rendition of life in the camps and above all Yellen's casting of Vanessa Redgrave to play her. Redgrave was a well-known PLO sympathizer and, standing close to six feet tall, bore little resemblance to the petite Fania. "I do not accept a person to play me who is the opposite of me ... I wanted Liza Minnelli. She's small, she's full of life, she sings and dances. Vanessa ... doesn't have a sense of humor, and that is the one thing that saved me from death in the camp", Fénelon said. She scolded Redgrave in person during a 60 Minutes interview but the actress garnered the support of the acting community. Fénelon never forgave Redgrave, but eventually softened her view of the production to concede that it was "a fair film".

== Works ==
- Fénelon, Fania (1976). Sursis pour l'orchestre (in French) (1st ed.). Paris, France: Stock. ISBN 2234004977.

=== Translations ===
- Fénelon, Fania (1977). The Musicians of Auschwitz. Translated by Judith Landry (1st ed.). London, England, UK: Michael Joseph. ISBN 978-0718116095. LCCN 78311129.
- Fénelon, Fania (1977). Playing for Time. Translated by Judith Landry (1st ed.). New York: Atheneum. ISBN 978-0689107962. LCCN 77005502.
- Fénelon, Fania (1980). Das Mädchenorchester in Auschwitz (in German). Translated by Sigi Loritz. Frankfurt, Germany: Röderberg-Verlag. ISBN 978-3876827216.
