= Jacob Roll (born 1794) =

Norwegian politician

Jacob Roll (10 January 1794 – 23 November 1857) was a Norwegian politician.

He was elected to the Parliament of Norway in 1839, 1842, 1845, 1848 and 1851, representing the rural constituency of Smaalenenes Amt. He was also a deputy representative in 1836. He worked as a farmer, and owned a sawmill and a mill.
