= Role (disambiguation) =

A role (social role) is the expected behaviour of a person in society, or the function of someone or something in a context.

Role or roles may also refer to:

== Entertainment ==
- Role (performing arts), a character played by an actor

== Places ==
- Role, Lublin Voivodeship, eastern Poland
- Role, Pomeranian Voivodeship, northern Poland
- Role, West Pomeranian Voivodeship, north-western Poland

== Other uses ==
- Rholes, or Roles, a tribal leader in Scythia Minor c. 31–27 BC

== See also ==
- Thematic role (disambiguation)
- Role theory, a perspective in sociology
- Roles (surname)
