= Roger Sacheverell Coke =

English composer and pianist (1912–1972)

- Born: 20 October 1912; Pinxton, Derbyshire, England
- Died: 23 October 1972 (aged 60)
- Genres: Classical
- Occupations: Pianist; composer
- Instrument: Piano
- Years active: Early 1930s – 1972

Roger Sacheverell Coke (/ˈkʊk/ ("cook"); 20 October 1912 – 23 October 1972) was an English composer and pianist.

== Life ==
Roger Sacheverell Coke was from a wealthy family. He inherited the family estate of Brookhill Hall, Pinxton at the age of two, when his father, Lieutenant Langton Sacheverell Coke, died at the Battle of Ypres in October 1914. Coke began composing when he was at Eton College, where he was taught by Henry Ley, and was influenced to take up the piano by hearing Benno Moiseiwitsch. Coke's musical interests were strongly supported by his mother and for his 21st birthday, she had outbuildings on the family estate converted to a large music studio and performance space, equipped with a Steinway piano, and with capacity for an audience of several hundred. He pursued his study of composition and the piano seriously. He took piano lessons in London with Mabel Lander (herself a pupil of Theodor Leschetizky and teacher of Princesses Elizabeth and Margaret) and was later a pupil of Alan Bush. He made his debut as a composer-pianist in 1932 with his first piano concerto, and formed the Brookhill Symphony Orchestra in 1940 to play his own and other neglected works.

Coke was homosexual, and a heavy cigarette smoker. Despite his freedom from financial concerns, he suffered from depression. However, in the safe isolation of his studio he composed a large corpus of works, with a strong emphasis on his own instrument, the piano. For the orchestra he wrote three symphonies, six piano concertos, two "vocal concertos" for soprano and orchestra and four symphonic poems. In the chamber music field there are sonatas for cello and for violin, as well as extended works for piano solo, notably the 24 Preludes and 15 Variations and Finale, and around 100 songs. Despite the failure of any publisher to take up his works, some were performed around Britain, and occasionally broadcast. Coke bore the cost of those of his compositions that were published, and often also the costs of performance. Some works were taken up by leading musicians, including pianists Charles Lynch and Moura Lympany, and he counted Moiseiwitsch and Sergei Rachmaninoff amongst his friends.

In November 1959, Coke's three-act opera The Cenci, to his own libretto based on Shelley's verse drama, was given a single performance at the Scala Theatre in London, with the London Symphony Orchestra conducted by Sir Eugene Goossens. The critics were unanimously hostile and dismissive and Coke became seriously depressed. Coke died of a heart attack in 1972. A revival of interest in his work began in 2012 with a performance of his first violin sonata at the English Music Festival in Dorchester Abbey on 2 June 2012. Many of his unpublished manuscripts are held at Chesterfield Library.

== Works ==
Opus	Name	Year	Dedicatee
1	Piano Concerto No. 1 in C minor	1931	
2	Romanza for piano trio	1931	Dorothy Coke
3	Fantasie for piano	1931	Frederick Lyne
4	Piano Concerto No. 2 in E minor	1933	Mabel Lander
5	Three String Pieces	1933	John Frederick Staton
6	Rhapsody for oboe, bassoon & piano	1933	A & I Winfield
7	Three Small Pieces for wind quartet	-	Gilbert Inglefield
8	Piano Quintet	-	Ethel Boileau
9	(not known)	-	-
10	Improvisata for violin & piano	-	-
11	(not known)	-	-
12	Piano Sonata No. 1 in D minor	1935	George Chavchavadze
13	Symphony No. 1 in E minor	1934	-
14	(not known)	-	-
15	Variations and Fugue for piano in D minor	1935	-
16	Elegy for a Dead Musician for contralto, violin and orchestra (or piano)	1934	Bridget Tallents
17	(not known)	-	-
18	(not known)	-	-
19	Six Songs for soprano or tenor	1935	-
20	Two Songs for soprano or tenor and strings (or piano)	1935	-
21	Variations and Fugue for piano in D minor	1935	Alan Bush
22	Symphony No. 2 in G minor	1936	Sergei Rachmaninoff
23/3	Waltz for piano	-	-
24	Cello Sonata No. 1 in D minor	1936	Dorothy Coke
25	Vocal Concerto No. 1	1934	Barbara Welby
26	Piano Sonata No. 2 in G	1936	Charles Lynch
27	Ballade in C for piano	1936	Griselda Gould
28	Piano Sonata No. 3 in A minor	1937	-
29	Cello Sonata No. 2 in C	1938	Alan Morton
30	Piano Concerto No. 3 in E flat	1938	Charles Lynch
31	November Afternoon for soprano or tenor	1939	Natalia Satina
32	Elegiac Trio in C minor	1938	Bridget Jackson
33	Eleven Preludes for piano	1938	Dorothy Coke
34	Thirteen Preludes for piano	1941	Dorothy Coke
35	Sacred Concerto in A minor for soprano, cello, piano and oboe	1939	Princess Marina Chavchavadze
36	Poem for cello, piano and small orchestra	1939	Alan Morton
37	Fifteen Variations and Finale in C minor for piano	1939	Prince George Chavchavadze
38	Piano Concerto No. 4 in C sharp minor	1940	Eileen Joyce
39	Six Songs for soprano or tenor	1939	Guy Branch
40	Six Songs for contralto or bass	1939	Vera St. John
41	Prelude to 'The Cenci' for orchestra	1940	Richard Austin
41	The Cenci (opera in three acts)	1940	Richard Austin
42	Six Songs for contralto or bass	1941	Bridget Tallents
43	Eight Songs for soprano or tenor	1941	Barbara Welby
44	Cello Sonata No. 3 in A minor	1941	Kinkie Halswell
45	Symphonic Poem No. 1 'The Lotos Eaters'	1941	Brookhill Symphony Orchestra
46	Violin Sonata No. 1 in D minor	1940	Raymond Mosley
47	Vocal Concerto No. 2	1942	Oliver Welby
48	Clarinet Sonata in C	1942	-
49	Six Songs for contralto or bass	1942	Marianne Mislap-Kapper
50	Four Songs for soprano or tenor	1942	Barbara Welby
51	Symphonic Poem No. 2 'Elegiac Ballade'	1942	The Pilots of the Royal Air Force
52	Variations on Rachmaninoff's Song, 'A Soldier's Wife' in G minor for piano	1943	-
53	Symphonic Poem No. 3 'Dorian Gray'	1943	Arnold Bax
54	Fourteen Songs, from Rhymes and Roundelayes for high voice	1948	Freda Orton
55	Violin Sonata No. 2 in B flat minor	1943	Jan Sedivka
56	Symphony No. 3	1948	William Leak or Eugene Goossens
57	Piano Concerto No. 5 in D minor	1947	F. Orton
58	Thirty Songs for low voice	1948	Frances and Ronald Coke-Steel
59	Trio in G for flute, viola and piano	1948	Ortina
60	Viola Sonata in C minor	1948	Gordon Fox
61	Variations on 'Drink to Me Only With Thine Eyes' in B flat for piano	1949	Louis Kentner
62	Cello Sonata No. 4 in A	1949	-
63	Piano Concerto No. 6 in C minor	1954	John Williams (1965/66), Oliver Welby (1954/69)
64	(not known)	-	-
65	Piano Quintet	1970	Simon Holwell
66	String Quartet	1971	Clive Jones or the Alfreton Hall String Quartet
67	Six Songs for soprano or tenor	1954	Olive Wright
68	(not known)	-	-
69	(not known)	-	-
70	Six Songs for high voice	1956	Barbara Welby
71	Six Songs for high voice	1956	Cossack Shannon
72	Six Songs for high voice	1957	Doris
73	Variations in C sharp minor for piano	1957	Julie Marie Baud
74/1	Thule for soprano	1958	Barbara Welby
75	Cello Sonata	1962	-
76	(not known)	-	-
77	(not known)	-	-
78	(not known)	-	-
79	Piano Concerto No. 6 in C minor	1954	-
80	Violin Concerto	1960	Raymond Mosley
81	Four Songs	1966	Hugo Meynell
81	Three Songs for soprano	1960	Percy Young
82	Piano Quintet in F minor	1967	Patricia Hurst
83	Trio in G minor	1960	-
	Polichinelle & Inventions (in 2 parts) for piano	1936	Emanuel Yarovsky
	Berceuse for piano	1936	Griselda Brook
	Violin Sonata	1953	-
	Moment Musical for piano in D minor	1954	John Williams
	Song	1964	Julie
	Song	1964	Donald Grundy
	Piano Concerto in G minor	1970	-
	Piano Studies	1971	-
	Song for soprano or tenor	1966	Hugo Meynell
	Daffodils (song)	-	-
	Dearest Do Not You Delay Me (song)	-	-
	Isles of Greece (song)	-	-

== Recordings ==
- Violin Sonata No 1 – Rupert Marshall-Luck (violin) and Matthew Rickard (piano) (EM Records, EMRCD018, 2013)
- 24 Preludes and 15 Variations and Finale for piano – Simon Callaghan (Somm Recordings, SOMMCD 0147, 2015)
- Piano Concertos No 3, No 4 and No 5 (surviving slow movement) – Simon Callaghan (piano), Martyn Brabbins, BBC Scottish Symphony Orchestra (Hyperion Records, CDA68173, 2017)
- Cello Sonatas, Raphael Wallfisch (cello), Simon Callaghan (piano) (Lyrita SRCD.384, 2020)
