= Moiseiwitsch =

Moiseiwitsch is a surname. Notable people with the surname include:

- Benno Moiseiwitsch (1890–1963), Russian and British pianist
- Tanya Moiseiwitsch (1914–2003), British theatre designer
