= Frank Merrick =

English pianist and composer (1886–1981)

Frank Merrick CBE (30 April 1886 – 1981) was an English classical pianist and composer in the early 20th century.

== Life ==
Merrick was born in Clifton, now part of Bristol, the son of musical parents. Due to his asthma he was mostly educated at home by his parents and by a governess. At the age of eleven he was taken to play for the great Polish pianist Paderewski, who suggested he go to Vienna to study with Theodor Leschetizky. While in Vienna he met Johann Strauss II and showed him a waltz he'd composed. After 70 or more lessons with Leschetizky he returned to London and made his debut, first in 1902 with the Halle Orchestra under Hans Richter, and the following year at the Bechstein Hall.

In 1908-9 he toured Australia with the contralto Dame Clara Butt and played with various chamber musicians, most notably Henry Holst. During the First World War he was imprisoned as a conscientious objector, and learned Esperanto with the help of fellow-prisoner Montagu C. Butler. He dedicated much time to the language and spoke it well; in 1965 he made a recording of some of the Esperanto songs with the well-known mezzo-soprano Sybil Michelow.

From 1911 to 1929 he taught at the Royal Manchester College of Music and from 1929 at the Royal College of Music. His students included David Gow, Michael Garrett, the pianist and teacher Stephen Gosney, Thomas Pitfield, Gordon Green, and Alan Rawsthorne.

Late in his life he was awarded MMus by Bristol University, when they first introduced the degree. At the age of 80 in 1966 he gave a two hour concert at the Wigmore Hall. Around 1967 he returned to the Victoria Rooms, Clifton, to celebrate the 75th anniversary of his first public recital, as a child, largely reprising the programme he had played at his début. Even later, in 1976, he visited the London Esperanto Club to be interviewed, in Esperanto, on the occasion of his 90th birthday. He was appointed a CBE in the 1978 New Year Honours. He died in London, where he lived at 16, Horbury Crescent, Notting Hill.

== Pianist ==
Merrick's peers included Artur Schnabel and Mark Hambourg, and he was perhaps the foremost exponent of the Theodor Leschetizky method in Britain (others included Benno Moiseiwitsch and Mabel Lander).

He made several recordings of the music of Sir Arnold Bax, including the composer's first violin sonata (reissued on compact disc in 2003) and the four piano sonatas. Bax's Pæan for piano is dedicated to him. With Michael Round he made a recording of the Sonata for two pianos and other works by Bax. Other enthusiasms included the keyboard music of Debussy, Reger, Scarlatti and especially Prokofiev, particularly the piano sonatas. Several later LP recordings of Frank Merrick playing various works by John Field and other British composers were released on the British label Rare Recorded Editions. A "Frank Merrick Society" was formed to release his recordings. He spent many hours at the British Museum copying by hand the works of Field, who at that time was little known; the result was his edition of Field's piano concertos which became vol. 17 of Musica Britannica. Merrick also edited editions of Chopin.

His book, Practising the Piano, first published by Barrie and Jenkins in 1960, has gone through at least four printings.

== Composer ==
Merrick is particularly known for winning in 1928 the Columbia Gramophone Company competition to write the remaining movements (scherzo and finale) of Schubert's 8th Symphony. His composition was recorded by Columbia and sold, although these recordings are primarily, if not all, on 12-inch records and now very rare. Other works include a symphony (1912), two piano concertos (1901, 1936), choral music, chamber works and the Piano Sonata in A Minor (1902). His Suite in the eighteenth-century style for solo cello has been recorded by Steven Isserlis.

The original manuscripts of his compositions were donated to CHOMBEC (Centre for the History of Music in Britain, the Empire and the Commonwealth) and the archives of Bristol University. There are many items, including a large number of Esperanto songs, over 30 of which, by his own account, he composed.

== Personal life ==
Before World War I he married the pianist, composer and suffragette Hope Squire. After the death of his first wife in 1936, Merrick married one of his students, Sybil Phoebe Case, in 1937. They had three children: Phoebe Hope (1939-), Paul Antony (1941-) and Celia Frances (1946-).

Merrick was a vegetarian and teetotaller. He was a vice-president of the Vegetarian Society.
