= Lauri Kennedy =

Australian cellist (1896 - 1985)

- Born: Irvine Robert Laurie Kennedy; 5 July 1896; Randwick, New South Wales, Australia
- Died: 26 April 1985 (aged 88) Sacramento, California, U.S.
- Genres: Classical, chamber
- Occupations: Musician, soloist, teacher
- Instrument: Cello
- Formerly of: New York Philharmonic

Lauri Kennedy (né Irvine Robert Laurie Kennedy; 5 July 1896 – 26 April 1985) was an Australian cellist.

== Early life ==
Irvine Robert Laurie Kennedy (he used Laurie, later dropping the final 'e') was born in Randwick, a suburb of Sydney, to an English-born father and native-born mother. He later recalled the family playing music together.

He studied with Herbert Walenn at the Royal College of Music, London, and Paul Grümmer in Vienna. Dame Nellie Melba noticed him and encouraged him to undertake further studies in the United States.

== Music career ==
In the US during the 1920s, he became principal cellist with the New York Philharmonic at the personal invitation of Arturo Toscanini. He played chamber music with performers such as Arthur Rubinstein and Jascha Heifetz. In the United Kingdom he played in a noted piano quartet called the Chamber Music Players with Albert Sammons, Lionel Tertis and William Murdoch. He also appeared with the tenor John McCormack for a number of years, and appears on record accompanying McCormack.

He became principal cellist with Sir Adrian Boult's BBC Symphony Orchestra at its inception in 1929 and played with them until 1935. It has been stated that his cello can be heard in the slow movement of Boult's 1935 recording of the Brahms 2nd Piano Concerto with Artur Schnabel.

However, Kennedy himself said that, while it was planned that he should play the cello solo, by the time the recording was actually made (Nov. 1935), he had left the BBCSO, and that it was Ambrose Gauntlett whose cello playing is recorded with Schnabel. He recorded music with Fritz Kreisler and William Primrose, including Kreisler's String Quartet in A minor in 1935 with members of the London String Quartet. He recorded Edgar Bainton's Cello Sonata. After Felix Salmond and Guilhermina Suggia turned it down, Lauri Kennedy was engaged to premiere Frank Bridge's Oration (1929-30) for cello and orchestra, but withdrew during rehearsals: Florence Hooton was the eventual soloist. He also became a professor at the Royal College of Music.

His wife, Dorothy Kennedy (née McBride), was a pianist who also accompanied John McCormack and taught the children of Enrico Caruso. Lauri and Dorothy performed together in some recordings.

They made a highly successful tour of Australia in 1938. They then went to the United States again, where Lauri joined Toscanini's NBC Symphony Orchestra. He relocated to Hollywood and his playing is heard on a number of films, including Walt Disney's Fantasia.

In 1944, they returned to Australia permanently. They bought hotels in Taree and Sydney, and Lauri taught at music camps. Australian singers he accompanied included Stella Power. Lauri later taught cello at the Canberra School of Music in 1966, resigning after only one year due to poor health. His private students include John Painter, himself a future director of the Canberra School of Music.

Dorothy Kennedy died in 1972. Lauri Kennedy died on 26 April 1985, in Sacramento, California, where he was living with their eldest son, David. Their son John Kennedy was also a cellist and was the natural father of the violinist Nigel Kennedy. Lauri Kennedy's cousin was violinist Daisy Kennedy.

== Sources ==
- "Nigel Kennedy: I didn't want to be the Des O'Connor of the violin". Archived from the original on 7 January 2009.
