= Daisy Kennedy =

Australian violinist (1893–1981)

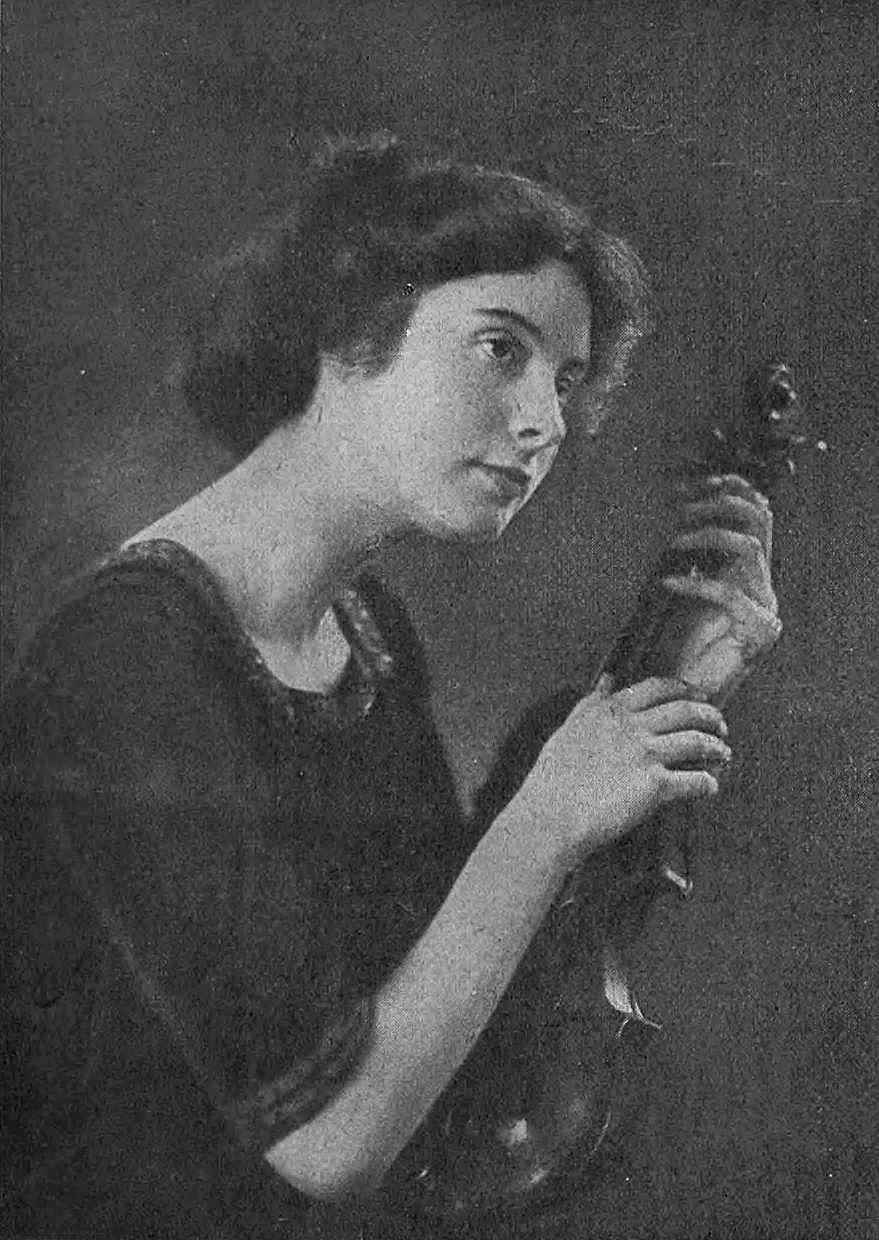
- Daisy Kennedy in 1923

Background information
- Born: 16 January 1893; Burra-Burra, South Australia
- Died: 30 July 1981 (aged 88); Hammersmith, London, England
- Instrument: Violin

Daisy Fowler Kennedy (16 January 1893 – 30 July 1981) was an Australian-born concert violinist.

She was born in Burra-Burra, 160 km north of Adelaide, to parents of Scottish and Irish descent. Her father, Joseph A. Kennedy, was headmaster of Glenelg Primary School and president of the South Australian Public School Teachers' Union. For three years, she was Elder scholar at the Adelaide Conservatory under Mrs. Alderman and Hermann Heinicke. She was a private pupil of Otakar Ševčík in Vienna for a year, and then studied for two years in the Meister-Schule there. She appeared in London in 1911 and toured widely in Europe and in the United States, Australia and New Zealand.

On 15 April 1914, she married the Russian pianist Benno Moiseiwitsch; their daughter, the theatre designer Tanya Moiseiwitsch, was born in December the same year. They had a second daughter, Sandra. After divorcing Moiseiwitsch, she married the English playwright and poet John Drinkwater in December 1924. They had a daughter, Penny Drinkwater, who went on to become a wine writer and member of the circle of wine writers.

On 24 August 1927 a Proms performance of Brahms' Violin Concerto ground to a halt in the first movement. Kennedy apparently blamed a lack of rehearsal time, but the Times said that she suffered "a lapse of memory...which had the effect of making her play all the better when she recovered her nerve".

"Of her sex - the foremost living violinist" - London Morning Post

She was a cousin of cellist Lauri Kennedy, and thus also related to Lauri's son John Kennedy, another cellist, and grandson, the violinist Nigel Kennedy.
