= Zudie Harris Reinecke =

American composer and pianist

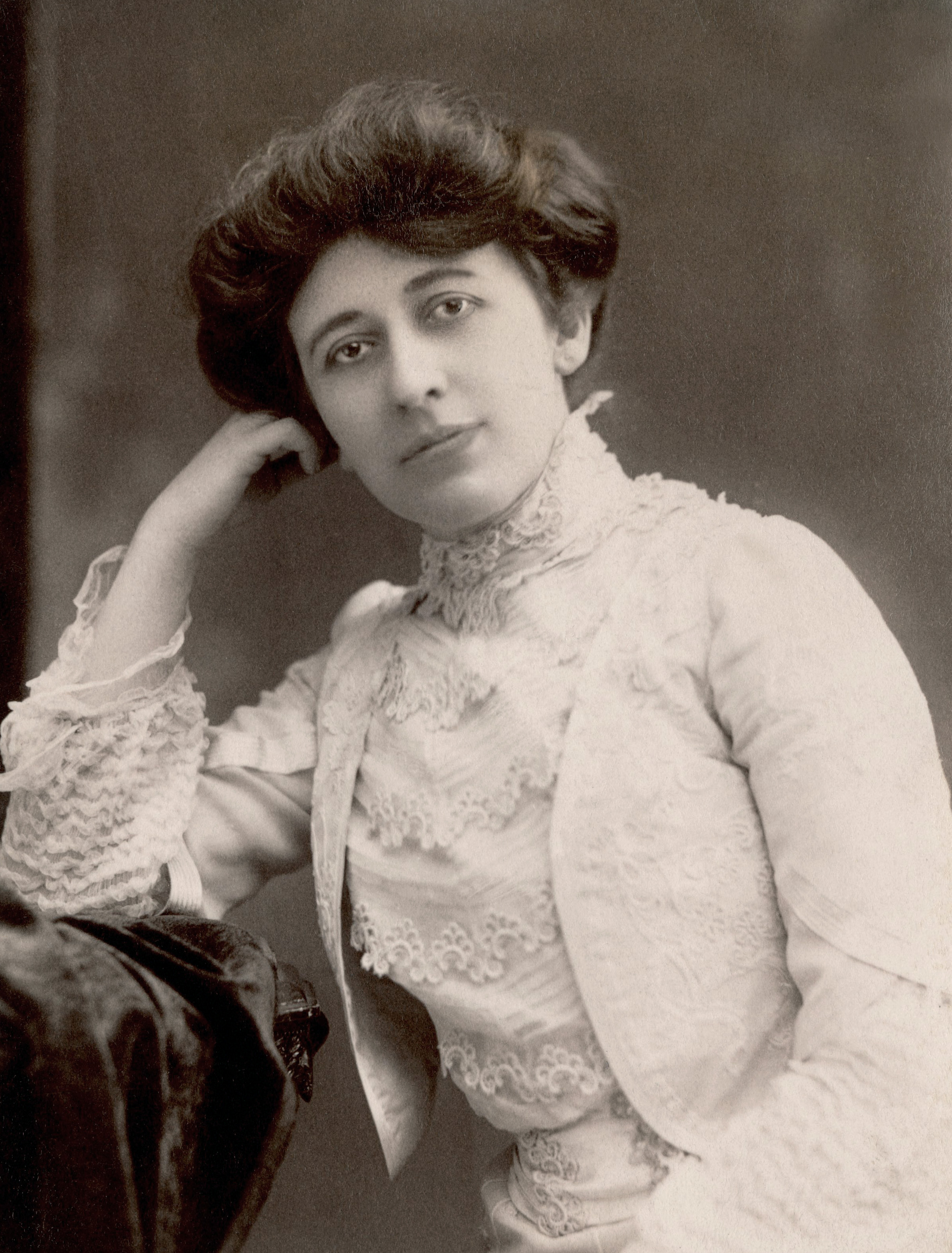
- Zudie Harris, c. 1900 (photo by Aimé Dupont)
- Born: Zudie Harris; May 31, 1870; Louisville, Kentucky
- Died: February 2, 1924 (aged 53); Louisville, Kentucky
- Occupation: composer

Zudie Harris Reinecke (May 31, 1870 - February 2, 1924) was an American composer and pianist.

She studied music in Berlin and Vienna for sixteen years. and attained more popularity as a composer in Europe than in her home country. This was in part due to her songs being performed by Lili Lehmann and Scharwenka. As a pianist, she was a student of Theodor Leschetizky and Vladimir de Pachmann. She appeared as a concert pianist in Walter Damrosch's orchestra as well as for the Chicago Symphony Orchestra.

Her father was Theodore Harris, founder of the Louisville National Banking Company, and had three sisters. She was married to William Reinecke, president of the Ohio Valley Electric Company.

She died on February 2, 1924, after several years of ill health.

The Zudie Harris Reinecke Memorial Music Scholarship Fund, is awarded to an outstanding junior in the School of Music at the University of Louisville.
