= CHOMBEC =

Part of the music department at the University of Bristol

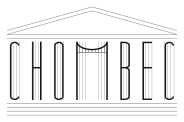

CHOMBEC stands for the Centre for the History of Music in Britain, the Empire and the Commonwealth. It was a part of the music department at the University of Bristol (UK) until the summer of 2017. It was founded in 2006 by Professor Stephen Banfield. CHOMBEC's aims were to encourage and provide a focal point for research into the history of music in the British Empire, in Britain, and within the West Country.

CHOMBEC, in association with the University of Bristol, ran an MA (Master of Arts) degree in British music. The programme offered the opportunity to specialise in music of the British Empire and music in the West Country.

CHOMBEC also ran seminars and conferences on various aspects of British music. These have included 'Vaughan Williams, Hardy and the Ninth Symphony' (spring 2008), 'Rubbra Revived: Sinfonia Sacra and Beyond' (Spring 2008), 'The Sounds of Stonehenge' (autumn 2008), 'Celebrating George Dyson' (spring 2007), and 'Robert Pearsall - Bristol's Forgotten Composer' (autumn 2006). The most recent, 'The Sounds of Stonehenge' explored the multiple soundscapes of the ancient stone's 5,000-year history. The cultural history of the stones, their acoustics, and Neolithic England's musical instruments were presented in a one-day workshop that brought Stonehenge's legend up-to-date with its depiction and importance in film and rock music.

CHOMBEC still hosts a number of academic archives that have been donated to the Centre since it was founded. Archives are held at the university's Special Collections section of the Arts and Social Sciences Library and can include manuscript scores, audio recordings, and personal papers relating to the composers and their lives. In 2008 archives for Edgar Hunt, Sir Michael Tippett, a combined archive for Frank Merrick and Hope Squire, and one for John Raynor were all acquired by the university. These archives join the Stanley Godman archive donated in 2007.

CHOMBEC published a twice-yearly newsletter, CHOMBEC News, with articles on composers, performers, and research projects around the world: archive copies of older editions of CHOMBEC News can be downloaded from their website as PDF files.
