= Timothy Bowers =

British composer and academic

- Born: 1954 (age 70–71); Surrey, England
- Occupation: Composer

Timothy Bowers (born 1954) is a composer, performer and music lecturer.

Bowers was born in Surrey and began playing violin with the Croydon Youth Orchestra. He started composing aged 11, then trained at the Royal Academy of Music with Alan Bush. He also studied privately with David Blake, at the University of London, and at the University of York with David Kershaw. Since 1979 he has taught at the Academy.

He is best known for his guitar compositions (including the 2018 Guitar Concerto and many short pieces), and instrumental sonatas (including five for brass). But his list of more than 80 works also includes orchestral and chamber music, choral pieces and music for the theatre and documentary films. Among his eleven (to date) song cycles are the three books of Last Words, setting the final words of fourteen historical characters and two epitaphs by Byron. He has worked closely with the Finnish choir Campanella.

Bowers has written on Alan Bush and edited some of his late works. The book Composers on the 9 includes a substantial essay on Malcolm Arnold's symphonies, alongside brief contributions from other composers. Strings, Winds, Pipes, Pianos and Food is a survey of Arnold's many concertos.

== Selected works ==
- Elegy for guitar: 'Hommage to Dowland'
- Fantasy on an Old English Melody for four guitars
- Five Preludes for guitar (2003)
- Concerto for Guitar and Orchestra (2018, commissioned by the Royal Academy of Music)
- Lift-Off! A Journey Into Space for violin, cello and classical accordion (2020)
- Piano Sonata No 1 (1985)
- Piano Sonata No 2 (2003)
- Sinfonia Concertante for Five solo Brass, Brass and Percussion (2009)
- Sonata for Bass Tuba and Piano (2006)
- Sonata for Bass Trombone and Piano (2006)
- Sonata for Tenor Trombone and Piano (2007)
- Sonata for Horn and Piano (2008)
- Sonata for Trumpet and Piano (2008)
- Sonatina for guitar
- Summer Music for four guitars
- Three Elegiac Melodies for two guitars (1986)
- Two Paganini Fantasies for violin and accordion
- Variations on the Earl of Salisbury's Pavane
- Violin Sonata (1999)
- Winter Journey for two guitars

== Books ==
- Composers on the 9 (QTP, 2011)
- Strings, Winds, Pipes, Pianos and Food (QTP, 2013)
