= Agnes Hope Pillsbury =

American pianist

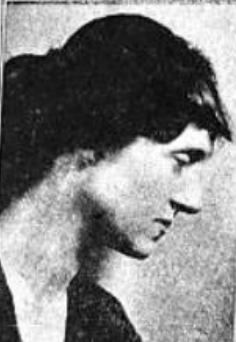
- Agnes Hope Pillsbury, from a 1927 publication
- Born: September 28, 1876; Bangor, Maine, U.S.
- Died: February 10, 1937 (aged 60); Chicago, Illinois, U.S.
- Occupation(s): Pianist, music educator, settlement worker
- Known for: Resident at Hull House

Agnes Hope Pillsbury (September 28, 1876 – February 10, 1937) was an American pianist, music educator, and settlement worker. She taught and performed in Chicago for most of her career, and lived at Hull House for almost twenty years.

== Early life and education ==
Pillsbury was born in Bangor, Maine, the daughter of Frederick A. H. Pillsbury and Sara C. Berry Pillsbury. Her father ran a hardware store. She trained as a pianist with Theodor Leschetizky in Vienna. Her aunts Mary Ayer and Fanny Cliff Berry were both pianists too.

== Career ==
Pillsbury was a concert pianist in Chicago. In 1927, she was a soloist with the Chicago People's Symphony. In 1929, she played a Helen Sears composition with the Woman's Symphony Orchestra of Chicago, with Ebba Sundstrom conducting. She served on board of the Musicians Club of Women, and was an active member of Chicago's Cordon Club, for women in the arts.

Pillsbury also taught piano and music. She taught at Oxford College in Ohio before 1905, and joined the faculty of the Bush Conservatory of Music in 1908. She also taught at Augustana College in the 1910s. She spent the summer of 1920 in Los Angeles, teaching and performing. She taught piano at the University of Notre Dame Summer School from 1924 to 1936. She taught from her own studio in Chicago.

Pillsbury lived at Hull House from about 1920, and helped to direct the program's music school. She invited pianist Vivian Blythe Owen to join in the work at Hull House.

== Personal life ==
Pillsbury died in 1937, at the age of 60, in Chicago. Her funeral service was held at Hull House. Some of her papers are in the Alma Birmingham Papers at the University of Illinois at Chicago Library.
