= Charles Proctor (conductor) =

English conductor, organist and composer (1906–1996)

Charles Proctor (5 April 1905 – 26 November 1996) was an English pianist, choral conductor, composer, adjudicator and author on musical subjects. He was the founder of the Alexandra Choir in 1940.

== Career ==
Proctor was born in East Finchley, London and educated at Highgate School. He studied at the Royal Academy of Music with Julius Harrison and later with Emil Sauer in Dresden and Vienna. His early career was as an organist and concert pianist. From 1930-36 he directed the North London Orchestral Society. During the war he served in the War Department Constabulary.

In 1940 he founded the Alexandra Choir (based at Alexandra Palace) at the request of Sir Henry Wood, who needed a choir for his Promenade Concert series: the choir made its Proms debut with Beethoven's Ninth Symphony on 19 August 1941. It also sang in the Victory Concert at the Royal Albert Hall on 31 May 1945, culminating in a post-war tour of Holland the following year. The Alexandra Choir also participated in the 12 seasons in which Josef Krips conducted Beethoven's Ninth at the Royal Festival Hall during the 1950s and 1960s. The choir remained a central part of London choral music for 38 years. Proctor was its conductor until 1978.

As a conductor he performed widely at venues including the Royal Albert Hall, Covent Garden, where he was chorus master to Albert Coates, and for other large scale spectacular pageants produced there by T. C. Fairbairn - including 14 performances of Gounod's Faust in February 1938 with a cast of over 1,000. As chorus master for the Royal Choral Society, Proctor often deputised for Malcolm Sargent as Sargent became increasingly ill towards the end of his life in the 1960s.

Proctor was the composer of a Choral Symphony, first performed in 1937 at the Northern Polytechnic Theatre, a Piano Concerto (1947), and various sonatas as well as songs and part songs. Later in his career he focused more on teaching, adjudicating and examining, particularly at Trinity College of Music and at the annual North London Musical Festival.

== Personal life ==
From 1943 to 1973 Charles Proctor was organist at St Jude-on-the-Hill Church in Hampstead Garden Suburb. In 1945 he married the painter and sculptor Rosemary Rennie (daughter of Father Maxwell Rennie of St Jude's, 1936–1954). Some of her work can be seen in the church, and she also produced a bronzed effect cast plaster bust of her husband. Their London address in the 1950s and 1960s was 13 Eastholm, Barnet. In the late 1970s they moved to Hiham Green, Winchelsea in Rye, East Sussex where Proctor acted as organist and choirmaster at Rye Parish Church. He was appointed OBE in 1980. Rosemary died in 1995. Charles Proctor died, aged 91, on 26 November 1996 in Rye.

== Compositions ==
- Cello Sonata
- Choral Symphony (1937)
- Chorale and Passacaglia for organ
- Five Mystic Songs
- Missa Brevis for voices and organ
- Organ Sonata in D minor
  - (two other organ sonatas)
- Piano Concerto in F Minor (premiere 1947, soloist Iris Loveridge)
- Portrait of Palestine, Imperial War Museum film (1947)
- Sonatina for Piano
- Te Deum for voices and organ
- There is Sweet Music, part song, text Tennyson (1946)
- Thirty six fugues from the forty eight, Bach fugues arranged for piano four hands (1949)
- Three Children's Songs
- Veni Creator for voices and orchestra
- Violin Sonata in A minor (1946)

== Books ==
- Music, Reason Why Series, Herbert Jenkins (1950)
- To Be a Professional Musician, Methuen (1951)
- Harmonization at the Keyboard, Herbert Jenkins, (1961)
- The Class Music Teacher, Herbert Jenkins (1965)
