= William Busch =

English composer (1901–1945)

- William Busch
- Born: 24 June 1901; London, England
- Died: 30 January 1945 (aged 43); Woolacombe, North Devon, England
- Occupations: Composer and musician
- Years active: 1921–1945
- Known for: Piano concerto, piano quartet, cello concerto

William Busch (24 June 1901 – 30 January 1945) was a British composer and musician. Busch studied music in London, Berlin and the United States. His composition teachers included John Ireland and Bernard van Dieren. He worked as a concert pianist before devoting himself more to music composition. But his pacifism during World War II resulted in decreased reception for his works during this time.

Busch died in 1945 in Woolacombe, North Devon, England. Music critic John Amis wrote that his works would have a lasting legacy due to their value.

== Early life and education ==
William Busch was born on 24 June 1901 in London. His parents were originally from Germany, and later went through the naturalization process to become citizens of the United Kingdom. His musical studies took him to London, Berlin and the United States. His studies in Germany took place between 1921 and 1924.

Busch learned musical composition under English composer John Ireland and Dutch composer Bernard van Dieren. He took instruction from piano tutor Mabel Lander. His piano skills were further honed by Leonid Kreutzer, Wilhelm Backhaus and Egon Petri.

== Music career ==
After his education, Busch came back to England and worked for a time as a concert pianist. He traveled and performed as a concert pianist in South Africa and the United States. After his work as a concert pianist, Busch subsequently devoted himself in the later part of his career to musical composition. He switched from performing regularly, to composition mainly, because of his affliction with stage fright.

Busch composed a piano concerto for the BBC Contemporary Music concert which he himself performed in 1938, and wrote a piano quartet in 1939. Between 1938 and 1939, Busch corresponded regularly with his composer colleague, Gerald Finzi. Their letters mainly focused on the sanctions imposed on Jews at the time in Germany by Adolf Hitler, with Finzi arguing staunchly against segregation. Busch's pacifism during World War II left himself and fellow composer William Wordsworth given less reception during this time period. His cello concerto, written in 1941, was performed at The Proms on 13 August 1943 with soloist Florence Hooton.

== Death and legacy ==
Busch married his wife Sheila in 1935. Their son Nicholas was born in 1939 and their daughter Julia on 26 January 1945. Visiting his newly born daughter in an Ilfracombe nursing home, Busch was forced to make the long journey back to Woolacombe on foot in the deep snow (because all transport had been cancelled). The resulting cold and exhaustion led to a severe internal haemorrhage, and to his tragic death on 30 January. At the time he was in the early stages of receiving significant recognition for his music works. Music critic John Amis wrote upon his death of his impact: "Recognition will not cease now, for his work has permanent values."

In 2010, Busch's work was highlighted at the Fourth Triennial Weekend of English Song, Ludlow, Shropshire, where the artistic director of the program called him an "unsung" composer and classed his compositions amongst the works of Muriel Herbert and Martin Shaw. Raphael Wallfisch released an album in 2014, British Music for Cello and Piano, featuring compositions by Busch. Lyrita released The Songs of William Busch in August 2022, performed by Diana Moore, Roderick Williams, Robin Tritschler and John Reid. Simon Callaghan has recorded the complete piano music.

== Works ==
Piano

- Gigue (1923)
- Theme, Variations and Fugue (1928)
- Allegretto quasi Pastorale (1933)
- Intermezzo (1935)
- Nicholas Variations (1942)

Chamber

- Passacaglia for violin and cello (1939)
- Piano Quartet in G Minor (1939)
- Cantilena for violin and piano (1942)
- Caprice for violin and piano (1943)
- Suite for cello and piano (1943)
- Lacrimosa for violin and piano (1944)
- Elegy for cello and piano (1944)
- A Memory for cello and piano (1944)

Orchestral

- Ode to Autumn for voice and strings (1937)
- Two Pieces for Wind Instruments (1924)
- Piano Concerto (1937-9)
- Prelude for Orchestra (1940)
- Cello Concerto (1940–41)
- Violin Concerto (1944-5 - unfinished)

Songs

- Slumber Song (1930)
- Sweet Content, Harvest Moon, Rest, Weep You No More, The Fairies (1933)
- Weep You no More (1935)
- Ode to Autumn, When Thou Did’st Give Thy Love To Me (1937)
- The Snowdrop in the Wind, The Centaurs, The Echoing Green, The Shepherd, If Thou Wilt Ease Thine Heart, Come, O Come My Life’s Delight, Laughing Song, Merry Hither Come (1942-3)
- The Bellman, L'Oiseau bleu, The Lowest Trees have Tops (1944)
- There Have Been Happy Days (1944), song cycle, texts by Wilfred Gibson
  - 'There Have Been Happy Days'
  - 'The Soldier'
  - 'The Goldfinches'
  - 'The Kitbag'
  - 'The Promise'

=== Recordings ===
- Chamber music (including Piano Quartet and Cello Suite: Members of the Piatti Quartet, Ashok Klouda (cello), Simon Callaghan (piano). Lyrita SRCD.439 (2024)
- Concertos (Cello Concerto and Piano Concerto): Raphael Wallfisch (cello), Piers Lane (piano), Royal Philharmonic Orchestra/Vernon Handley. Lyrita SRCD320 (2008)
- Piano music (including Allegretto quasi Pastorale, Gigue, Intermezzo, Nicholas Variations and Theme, Variations and Fugue): Simon Callaghan, piano. Lyrita SRCD408 (2022)
- Songs: Diana Moore (mezzo-soprano), Roderick Williams (baritone), Robin Tritschler (tenor), John Reid (piano). Lyrita SRCD409 (2022)
