= Florence Hooton =

English cellist

Florence Hooton (8 July 1912 – 14 May 1988) was an English cellist, chamber music performer and teacher, responsible for many notable British music premieres in the 1930s, 40s and 50s.

== Life ==
She was born in Scarborough, the daughter of a cellist, and studied at the Royal Academy of Music under Douglas Cameron, then in Zurich with Emanuel Feuermann.

Her debut recital was in 1934 at the Wigmore Hall and her BBC Proms debut a year later, playing Beethoven's Triple Concerto. During the 1930s she was a member of the Grinke Trio (with violinist Frederick Grinke and pianist Dorothy Manley, and later Kendall Taylor) and the New English String Quartet. She later formed the Loveridge-Martin-Hooton Trio with pianist Iris Loveridge and her husband, the violinist David Martin. It was active between 1956 and 1976. In 1953 she was selected by Sir Adrian Boult to play in the orchestra for the Coronation of Elizabeth II.

Hooton became a professor at the Royal Academy of Music in 1964 and also gave private lessons in Suffolk and Sheffield. The Academy holds a portrait of her by Wilfrid Gabriel de Glehn, painted in 1936. It is hanging in the Duke's Hall.

Hooton recorded with Decca from the late 1930s and was a frequent broadcaster. Her 1960s recordings of Arnold Bax with pianist Wilfred Parry on the Lyrita label were influential. Hooton's last public performance was in 1978. In 1981 she commissioned Gordon Jacob to write a Cello Octet for her students at the Royal Academy. She was appointed OBE in the 1982 Birthday Honours. Following her death the Academy established the annual David Martin/Florence Hooton Concerto Prize in her memory.

She married David Martin in 1938. They lived in Ickenham in Middlesex at 34, Thornhill Road, and later at 345 Stag Lane, London NW9. There were two daughters. Martin died in 1982.

=== Selected premiere performances ===
- Gordon Jacob's Divertimento for unaccompanied Cello (1934) which Jacob dedicated to her.
- Frank Bridge's Oration on 18 January 1936, after the work had been turned down by Felix Salmond and by Guilhermina Suggia.
- John Ireland's Trio No.3 in E Minor, first public performance on 20 June 1938 at Boosey & Hawkes’ Music Room, Regent Street, with Frederick Grinke and John Ireland.
- William Busch's Cello Concerto on 13 August 1943 at the Proms.
- Arnold Bax's Legend-Sonata in F sharp minor for cello and piano (with Harriet Cohen) premiered in 1943. The work is dedicated to her.
- Gordon Jacob's Cello Concerto at the Royal Albert Hall in 1955
- Kenneth Leighton's Cello Concerto at the Cheltenham Festival in 1956.
- Alan Bush's Concert Suite at the Royal Albert Hall in 1956.
- Helen Perkin's Cello Sonata in Eb in 1957 with the composer at the piano.
- Kenneth Leighton’s Partita in February 1963, with Wilfred Parry at the Wigmore Hall.
