= Peter Ritzen =

Flemish pianist composer and conductor

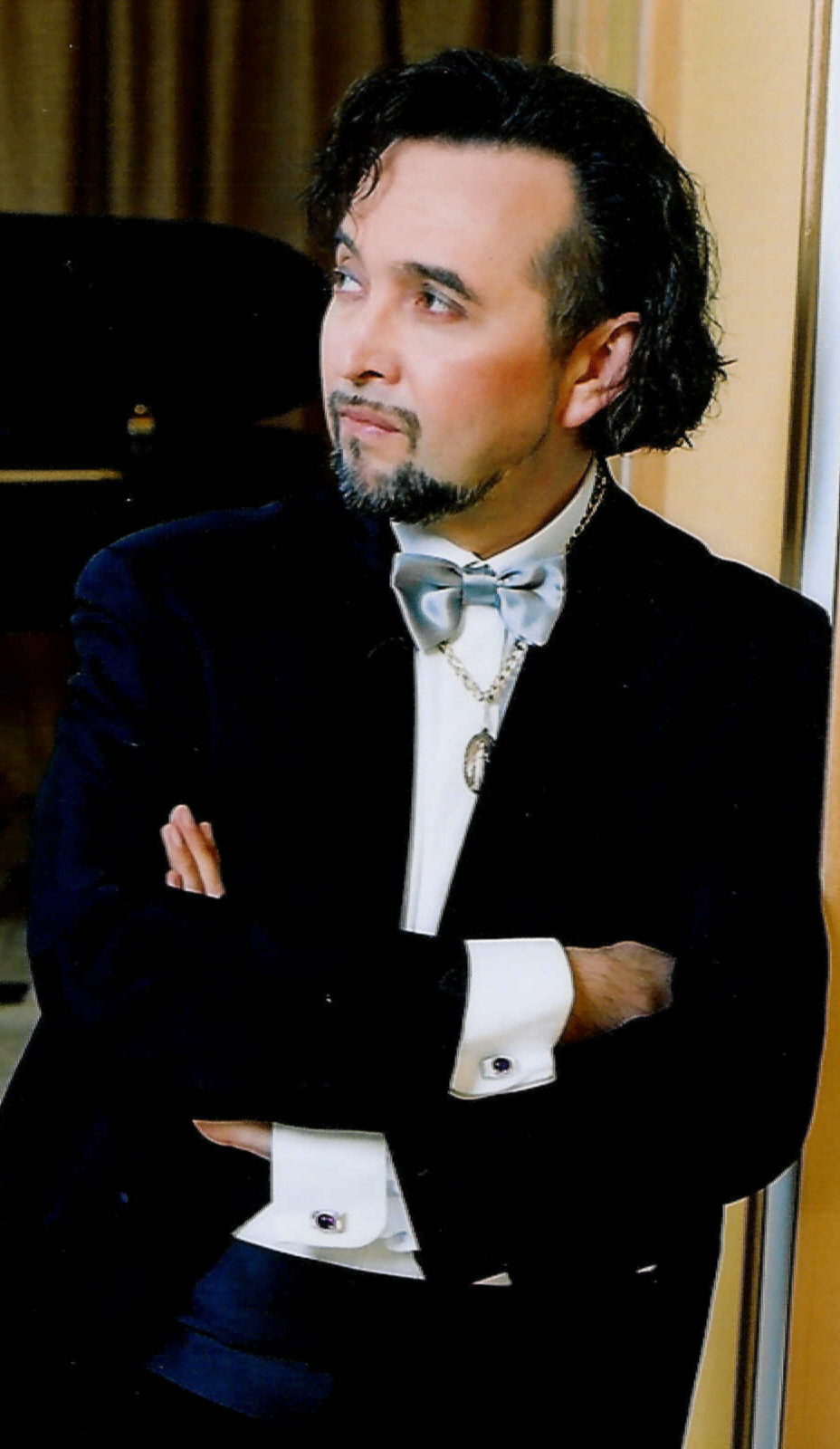
- Peter Ritzen
- Born: 21 January 1956 (age 70); Ghent, Belgium
- Occupations: composer, conductor

Peter Ritzen (born 21 January 1956) is a Flemish pianist composer and conductor.

== Life and career ==
Peter Ritzen studied piano and chamber music at the Royal Conservatory of his native city Ghent. His teachers were Louis Pas and François Glorieux. He continued his training at the Mozarteum in Salzburg, Austria, with the Russian pianist Tatiana Nikolayeva. He graduated with the Diplôme Supérieure d'Exécution for Piano from the Ecole Normale de Musique de Paris 'Alfred Cortot'. His teacher there was the Polish Piano pedagogue Marian Ribicky.

As a concert pianist, Ritzen has played throughout Europe, Asia and the US. He cooperated as a soloist with many well-known orchestras and ensembles. He is an acclaimed interpreter of Franz Liszt & Theodor Leschetizky. His contact with the Chinese Culture resulted in a whole repertoire of own China related compositions. As a result of free classical improvising in concerts on the piano, he transcribed numerous Chinese folk songs, award-winning movie themes and Viennese waltzes. Ritzen is a composer of massive works with many performers (+400). His transcendental symphony 'Heavenly Peace', world premiered in 2005 is a typical work in this magnitude. Ritzen is a performing artist for Naxos Records.

Ritzen is the founder and artistic director of the International Theodor Leschetizky Summer Academy at the Universität für Musik und darstellende Kunst Wien (University of Music and Performing Arts, Vienna) since 1991. In 2000 & 2004 he was invited to be the artistic director and chairman of the Jury of the International Piano Competition 'Theodor Leschetizky' in Taipei.

Between 2009 and 2014, Ritzen was invited by the Chinese Ministry of Culture to perform large scale piano concerts all over China.

In 2015, Ritzen was appointed artistic director of the New Cosmos International Music Festival. The inaugural concert was held at the Haydnsaal of Schloss Esterházy in Eisenstadt, Austria under Ritzen's baton. The world-famous cellist Christine Walevska was one of the featured soloists. The festival intends to combine Far East Musicians with European Music traditions.

Since 2016, Ritzen has been music director of the Vienna-based New Cosmos Philharmonic. The orchestra is featured as the festival orchestra at the annual New Cosmos International Music Festival in Vienna.

In 2017, Ritzen conducted at the Golden Hall of Musikverein in Vienna, the New Cosmos Philharmonic, the world premiere of his Symphonic Poem, 'Die Wildrose'. A work for grand orchestra, organ, chorus and soloists. The libretto is based on Flemish translated poems (to German language) by Anton van Wilderode (1918–1998). One of the soloists was the famous Baritone Peter Edelmann (son of the legendary Otto Edelmann), besides Ritzen's wife Stella Zhang-Ritzen, soprano.

In 2018, Ritzen became the president of Gesellschaft der New Cosmos Freunde in Wien/Vienna New Cosmos society. This non-profit organization combines the International Leschetizky Academy (1992), New Cosmos International Music Festival (2015) and New Cosmos Philharmonic (2016). The organization aims to progress intercultural links with European Traditions and the Far East, China in particular.

On 28 November 2018, Ritzen was knighted Officer in the Order of Leopold. Flemish Culture Minister Sven Gatz awarded the merit, granted by the Belgian King Filip, to Ritzen at the Belgian Embassy of Beijing in China.

Ritzen was appointed in June 2019 as intendant of the Leschetizky World Congress on 3–5 October 2019 in Bad Ischl, Austria

== Compositions ==
=== Piano ===
- Chinese Rhapsody Nr.1 (1987)
- Chinese Rhapsody Nr.2 'Dance of the little happy Buddhas' (1989)
- Chinese Rhapsody Nr.3 'Chinese Market' (1989)
- Sonata for Piano ('Adamant Variations') (1991)
- Award Winning Movie Themes (1999) [13 free transcriptions on famous movie themes]
- 4 Transcriptions on Viennese Waltzes of Johann Strauss II, Franz Lehár en Robert Stolz (2008)
- 4 Transcriptions on Chinese folk songs (2009)

=== Chamber music ===
- 3 Spanish Songs for soprano & piano on poems by Santiago Rupérez-Durá (1989)
- 15 Transcriptions on Chinese folk songs for soprano & strings. (1998)
- Piano Quintet in F♯ minor (2006)
- Eyskens Lieder Nr.1-2 for soprano, baritone and piano on text of Mark Eyskens (2015)
- Eyskens Lieder: 3 songs for Soprano & Piano on Flemish poems by Mark Eyskens (2016)
- Pauls Lieder: 5 songs for Soprano and Piano on German poems by Ilse Pauls (Vienna) (2016)

=== Concertos for piano and orchestra ===
- Concerto Nr.1 'China in the Year of the Dragon'. (A paraphrase on Southern Chinese Opera: 'A Fantastic Dream in the Garden') (1989)
- Concerto 'The Last Empress' (Paraphrase on the Chinese Peking Opera 'Last Empress' 1908) (1994)
- Concerto for Taiwan (2000)

=== Orchestral works ===
- Chinese requiem for soprano, piano, choir, grand orchestra en Chinese percussion, on a poem by Santiago Rupérez Durá. (1990–1994)
- Chinese Violin Rhapsody (1994)
- Chinese Flute Concerto (1995)
- Symphonic Poem 'Hua Chiao' [Overseas Chinese] for soprano and orchestra. (Libretto:Santiago Rupérez Durá) (1997)
- Transcendental Symphony 'Heavenly Peace' for organ, choir, grand orchestra, Chinese percussion- & instruments and soloists. [Libretto: Santiago Rupérez Durá] (2003)
- Sacred symphonic poem:'Finis est infinitus' for soprano, choir, large ensemble and percussion. [Libretto: Peter Ritzen (Hebrew, German) and Latin: 'Salve Regina'] (2009)
- Sacred Symphonic Poem Nr. 2: 'Die Wildrose' for organ, choir, grand orchestra and soloists. On poems by Anton van Wilderode. Composed in 2017, Beijing
- Two Orchestral Songs: 'Taborstunden' & 'Die Allerseligste Jungfrau Maria von Fatima' for Choir, Organ, Strings and Soprano on poems of Ilse Pauls. Composed in 2016, Beijing.
