= Ethel Newcomb =

American pianist (1875–1959)

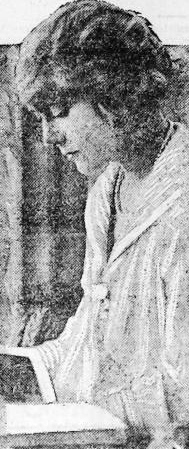
- Born: October 30, 1875; Whitney Point, New York
- Died: July 3, 1959 (aged 83); Whitney Point, New York
- Occupations: Concert pianist, educator, and author
- Notable work: Leschetizky as I Knew Him (1921)
- Parent(s): Willis Oscar Newcomb (1845–1917) and Mary L. (Seymour) Newcomb (1851–1946).

Ethel Newcomb (October 30, 1875 – July 3, 1959) was an American pianist. A pupil of Theodor Leschetizky, she became a successful soloist and ensemble performer across Europe and the United States during the early 1900s. Respected for her interpretations of the work of Beethoven, she was reportedly sought out as a mentor herself by students from across the globe after she opened her own music studio in New York prior to World War I.

In 1921, she recounted her experiences with her mentor via her book, Leschetizky as I Knew Him.

== Formative years ==
Born on October 30, 1875, in Whitney Point, New York, Ethel Newcomb was a daughter of New York natives Willis Oscar Newcomb (1845–1917) and Mary L. (Seymour) Newcomb (1851–1946). She grew up in Whitney Point, a community in Broome County, with her parents and siblings: Marie Louise (1877–1947), Clive Seymour (1879–1921), Elizabeth Tyler, and Marjorie (1889–1983).

Her first music teacher was reportedly her aunt, a gifted pianist in her own right who inspired Ethel Newcomb to begin piano lessons as a young child.

A resident of Vienna, Austria during the late 19th and early 20th centuries, Ethel Newcomb studied with Theodor Leschetizky from 1895 to 1903. In 1903, she made her debut with the Vienna Philharmonic Orchestra.

The following year (1904), she performed with the Queens Hall Orchestra in London during which she interpreted concerti of Schumann, Chopin, and Saint-Saëns. The orchestra was led by Richard Strauss.

From 1904 to 1908, she worked for Leschetizky as his assistant, an experience which proved a fertile ground for background research for her 1921 book, Leschetizky as I Knew Him.

The May 15, 1907 edition of the weekly journal, Musical Courier, provided the following insights into her artistry:

Excellent criticisms of Ethel Newcomb have appeared in various of the important European papers. Miss Newcomb, for some eight years, has been in Vienna, one of the few under-teachers of Theodore Leschetizky, and throughout that time has remained one of the brightest stars in the master's galaxy of disciples. She has been highly successful in her teaching and in her public appearances as pianist. Her debut was made some eight years ago under the care of her teacher, when she played the A minor Schumann concerto with orchestra. Since then she frequently has been heard at Leschetizky's classes, and, in 1904, with the co-operation of Dr. Richard Strauss, scored distinguished success in a London concert. In March of this year she concertized successfully in Bösendorfer Hall, Vienna, and is to spend the coming summer with her parents at Whitney Point, N. Y., where she will accept a few pupils....

In 1909, she performed for the wedding of Mark Twain's daughter, Clara Clemens, who wed Russian conductor and pianist Ossip Gabrilowitsch. The second oldest daughter of Twain, Clemens had relocated to Vienna with her family in 1896. While there, she studied piano and voice. Gabrilowitsch, a student of Anton Rubinstein, had, like Ethel Newcomb, studied with Leschetizky during the late 1890s. Her performance was documented in Albert Bigelow Paine's Mark Twain: A Biography:

October 6th was a perfect wedding-day. It was one of those quiet, lovely fall days when the whole world seems at peace. Claude, the butler, with his usual skill in such matters, had decorated the great living-room with gay autumn foliage and flowers, brought in mainly from the woods and fields. They blended perfectly with the warm tones of the walls and furnishings, and I do not remember ever having seen a more beautiful room. Only relatives and a few of the nearest friends were invited to the ceremony.... A fellow-student of the bride and groom when they had been pupils of Leschetizky, in Vienna — Miss Ethel Newcomb — was at the piano and played softly the Wedding March from "Tannhauser." Jean Clemens was the only bridesmaid, and she was stately and classically beautiful, with a proud dignity in her office. Jervis Langdon, the bride's cousin and childhood playmate, acted as best man, and Clemens, of course, gave the bride away. By request he wore his scarlet Oxford gown over his snowy flannels, and was splendid beyond words.... It was all so soon over, the feasting ended, and the principals whirling away into the future

Newcomb evidently then remained in touch with the couple for many years. The February 12, 1921 edition of The Bridgeport Times and Evening Farmer reported that she performed under Gabrilowitsch's baton with the Detroit Symphony Orchestra.

During her residency in Austria, Ethel Newcomb also performed various concerti with the Vienna Philharmonic; the majority of her performing career, however, was spent concertizing in the United States.

== Teaching career and arts advocacy ==
Sometime prior to the outbreak of World War I, Ethel Newcomb returned home to the United States, where she opened her own music studio in New York and continued to perform in recitals and concerts.

On April 7, 1917, she reportedly wed Eric Schuler.

In 1918, The Ogden Standard reported via its May 28 edition that “Miss Ethel Newcomb, the pianist, has offered her services free to Red Cross chapters in the larger cities for piano recitals, the object being to fill the treasuries of these organizations. Her concert tours in Europe have included the principal centers, where she has enjoyed unusual recognition.”

In 1919, she joined forces with a group of musicians and actors to lobby the U.S. Congress for the creation of a National Conservatory. According to the July 12 edition of The Bridgeport Times and Evening Farmer that year there was "a plan on foot to endow a National Conservatory with government aid and encouragement, and the representative members of both branches of the art are solidly behind this move:

Ethel Newcomb, perhaps the most famous of our native pianistes, whose chief glory has been won abroad but whose distinction permeates every music club in the United States, and is one of the most active of the musicians, and Otis Skinner and John Drew are quite as deeply interested on behalf of the actors. Miss Newcomb has, however, won chief honors because she has given her time and services to the propaganda.

The same edition of this publication went on to add:

The interests of musical and dramatic artists are to be combined in the serious attempt to make a reality of the hope of a National Conservatory in the United States next season. Ethel Newcomb, one of the most noted musical artists this country has produced, a concert pianiste of international renown, has spoken the most effective words in its favor. At the present time a bill is before the House providing for such an institution to foster musical and dramatic art among the younger generation, and to foster these arts in the most effective manner.

== Death and interment ==
Ethel Newcomb died at the Dauley Convalescent Home in Whitney Point, New York at 2:00 p.m. on Friday, July 3, 1959. Following services arranged by the Nichols Funeral Home, she was laid to rest at the same cemetery where her parents had been interred – Riverside Cemetery in Whitney Point, New York. Eighty-three years old at the time of her death, she was survived by her sisters, Mrs. Elizabeth (Newcomb) Clinton and Mrs. Marjorie (Newcomb) Finch.

== External resources ==
- Brée, Malwine and Seymour Bernstein. The Leschetizky Method: A Guide to Fine and Correct Piano Playing. Mineola, New York: Dover Publications, Inc., 1997.
- Newcomb, Ethel. Leschetizky as I Knew Him. New York, New York: D. Appleton and Company, 1921.
- von Hänsel-Hohenhausen, Markus. There can be no life without art, and no art without life - Theodor Leschetizky, in: M. v. H.-H.: On the Wonder of the Countenance in its Photographic Portrait. Charleston, South Carolina, 2013, ISBN 9781481283373.
