= Vita Witek =

Danish pianist (1868–1925)

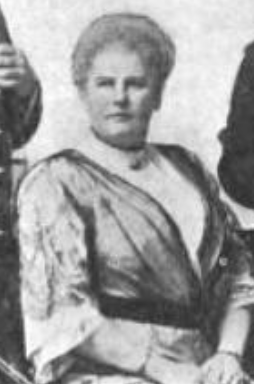
- Vita Witek, from a 1915 publication
- Born: Vita Friese; September 27, 1868; Copenhagen
- Died: June 25, 1925 (aged 56); Bayreuth
- Other name: Vita Gerhardt
- Occupation: Pianist
- Spouse: Anton Witek
- Children: Hjalmar Gerhardt

Vita Friese Gerhardt Witek (September 27, 1868 – June 25, 1925) was a Danish pianist, based in Berlin from 1884 to 1909, and in the United States from 1910.

== Early life and education ==
Vita Friese was born in Copenhagen. She trained as a pianist with Theodor Leschetizky and Teresa Carreño.

== Career ==
=== In Europe ===
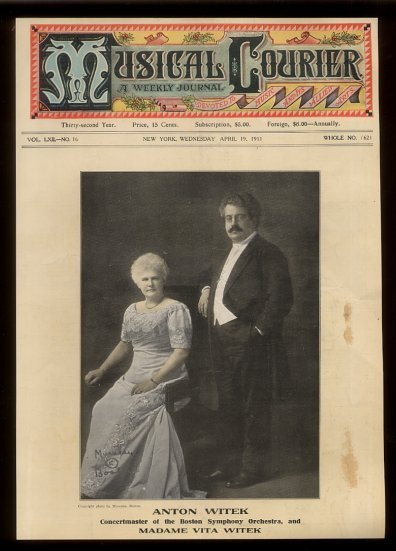
Vita and Anton Vitek, on the cover of Musical Courier in 1911

Gerhardt made her Berlin debut in 1884. She often performed with violinist Anton Witek; they toured together in Europe, and gave the first public performance of Richard Gompertz's "Violin Sonata in G Minor", in 1901. With Russian cellist Joseph Malkin, they formed the Berlin Philharmonic Trio in 1903. She was also known as a conductor in Berlin.

=== In the United States ===
Soon after she married Anton Witek in 1909, she moved to the United States, where her husband was concert master of the Boston Symphony Orchestra. They gave recitals together in New York City, Baltimore, and Boston. They also continued to play with Joseph Malkin, as the Witek-Malkin Trio. She endorsed Mason & Hamlin pianos in advertisements in 1911. She taught piano at the Von Ende School of Music in New York beginning in 1912, and served on the school's board of examiners.

== Personal life ==
Vita Friese married twice. She married Anton Witek in 1909. "Frau Witek says emphatically that a woman should not give up music just because she is married," reported The Violinist magazine in 1912. Her son Hjalmar Gerhardt became a musician. She died in 1925, at Bayreuth. Anton Witek remarried in 1926, to an American violinist, Alma Rosengren.
