= Iris Loveridge =

English classical pianist (1917–2000)

Iris Gwendolyne M. Loveridge (10 April 1917 – 6 November 2000) was an English classical pianist.

Born in West Ham, Essex, she attended the Lady Eleanor Holles School in Hampton, the Royal College of Music in 1934, and a year later was awarded the Ada Lewis Scholarship to attend the Royal Academy. Her teachers were Welton Hickin, and later Cyril Smith and Louis Kentner.

Loveridge first performed in public at the age of eight, but her professional concert debut was on 12 November 1938 at the Aeolian Hall when she played Beethoven and Brahms. By then she had already established a broadcasting relationship with the BBC for studio recordings. She performed at the wartime National Gallery concerts, and with encouragement and support from Henry Wood and John Barbirolli she was soon one of Britain's most popular exponents of the keyboard, regularly performing to audiences of more than 2,000 at London's Queen's Hall. Her repertoire (said to include over 50 concertos) was wide, but over many decades she specialised in British contemporary music, including piano works by Arnold Bax, Gordon Jacob (of which she was the dedicatee), E. J. Moeran (particularly the Rhapsody No. 3 for piano and orchestra), Kenneth Leighton, Edmund Rubbra and Antony Hopkins (the Sonata No. 3 in C# minor). In 1947 she gave the UK premiere of William Schuman's Piano Concerto with the BBC Symphony Orchestra under Basil Cameron, and of Charles Proctor's Piano Concerto in F minor at the Royal Albert Hall. In addition, she made appearances at the Henry Wood Proms, including the 1952 premiere of Doreen Carwithen's Piano Concerto.

She recorded music by Finnish composer Selim Palmgren in the late 1940s, and introduced the music of Albeniz, de Falla and other Spanish composers to England in the early 1950s. She also studied and performed the works of the Russians Prokofiev, Kabalevsky, Khachaturyan and Medtner. Post war she performed in duet with the oboist Evelyn Rothwell (Lady Barbirolli) up and down the country, also touring with cellist Florence Hooton and her violinist husband David Martin, and as a soloist. She continued to perform for BBC broadcasts, often commissioned by her friend Robert Simpson - a notable example being the studio series of six programmes devoted to Martinů's piano music in 1974. She retired professionally in 1995.

Her recordings of Bax's piano works (not quite a complete survey of his piano output, though most of his pieces for the instrument are represented) were recorded between 1959 and 1963 and were re-issued on CD by Lyrita Records in 2013. Lyrita also produced recordings of her performances of Moeran's solo piano music in the 1960s, re-issued on CD in 2008.

She married the City accountant (and amateur pianist) Henry Morriss in 1966, but continued to perform under her maiden name. Their address in the 1960s was her family home, 100 Woodcock Hill, Kenton, Harrow. They later moved to Beaconsfield. Henry died in 1995. Iris Loveridge died in Gloucester, survived by a stepson.
