= Tanya Moiseiwitsch =

British theatre designer (1914–2003)

Tanya Moiseiwitsch CBE OC
- Born: Tatiana Benita Moiseiwitsch; 3 December 1914; London, England
- Died: 19 February 2003 (aged 88); London, England
- Education: Central School of Arts and Crafts
- Occupation: Theatre designer
- Spouse(s): Felix Krish (né Konskier; 1916–1943) (m. 1942)
- Parents: Benno Moiseiwitsch (father); Daisy Kennedy (mother)

Tatiana Benita Moiseiwitsch CBE OC (3 December 1914 – 19 February 2003) was an English theatre designer.

== Life and career ==
Born in London, the daughter of Daisy Kennedy, an Australian concert violinist and Benno Moiseiwitsch, a Russian/Ukrainian-born classical pianist who became a British citizen in 1937, she attended the Central School of Arts and Crafts. A pioneering figure in 20th-century theatre design, Moiseiwitsch was the founding designer of the Canadian Stratford Festival and its theatre and designed the interior of St. Catherine's Chapel, Massey College. She also designed the stage of the Tyrone Guthrie Theatre in Minneapolis and of the Crucible Theatre, in Sheffield, England, which opened in 1971. Between 1935 and 1939 she was designer at the Abbey Theatre, Dublin, and designed more than 50 productions for it.

During her career, she had as many as five productions running at the same time in London, England. Some of her more notable productions included the Old Vic Company's Rostand's Cyrano de Bergerac, Britten's opera Peter Grimes at Covent Garden, Chekov's Uncle Vanya, and Sheridan's The Critic. She also designed sets and costumes for the English Stratford's 1953 tour of Australia. She designed a number of memorable sets for productions of the National Theatre. For Tyrone Guthrie she designed the modernized production of Ben Jonson's The Alchemist in 1962, for the Old Vic and Guthrie's beast-fable production of Jonson's Volpone for Laurence Olivier’s National Theatre in 1964. She worked with Tyrone Guthrie at the Stratford Memorial Theatre, in England, the Stratford Festival in Canada, the Habima in Israel and the Guthrie Theatre in Minneapolis. She designed the highly stylised sets for the 1947 hit musical Bless the Bride. She worked closely with Annette Garceau, costume maker, at the Old Vic and Stratford Ontario.

She had to her credit no fewer than five Broadway productions: Uncle Vanya and The Critic in 1946, The Matchmaker in 1955–57, The House of Atreus in 1968, and The Misanthrope in 1975. She designed CBC’s 1957 film of the Ontario Stratford Festival’s Oedipus Rex, Granada Television's 1983 film production of King Lear starring Laurence Olivier, and is also credited for the 2004 Broadway revival of King Lear, in which the scenery was based on her designs for Stratford.

Moiseiwitch was made a Commander of the Order of the British Empire (CBE) in 1976. In 2003, she was posthumously appointed as an honorary Officer of the Order of Canada for her "enormous impact on theatre arts in the 20th century".

In 2022 Sheffield Theatres renamed their Studio Theatre after her.

== Bibliography ==
- Edelstein, T.J.; Barlow, Alan (1994). The stage is all the world : the theatrical designs of Tanya Moiseiwitsch. Chicago, Ill.: David and Alfred Smart Museum of Art, The University of Chicago in association with the University of Washington Press. p. 134. ISBN 0-935573-14-3.
- The Production of King Oedipus by Tyrone Guthrie and Tanya Moiseiwitsch. Republished by Wordville Press (2022). ISBN 978-1-8384036-9-0
