= Mabel Lander =

British pianist and educator

Mabel Lander (1882 – 19 May 1955) was a British pianist and teacher, mostly remembered today as piano tutor to the Royal Family in the 1930s and 1940s, though her real legacy comes from her teaching several generations of prominent pianists, composers and musicians.

== Early career ==
Lander began her musical studies at the Berlin Hochschule in 1898 at the age of 17. She spent four years there, playing in concerts with the violin pupils of Joseph Joachim. Becoming disillusioned with the teaching she moved to Vienna and studied with Theodor Leschetizky, who himself had been a pupil of Carl Czerny. After several years in Vienna she moved to Dublin, where she established herself as a concert pianist and teacher. However, her career as a public performer was cut short (around 1917) when she developed a rheumatic complaint in her hands, which left her unable to satisfy her own high standards.

== London ==
During the war, Lander met another Leschetizky pupil (and disciple of the Leschetizky method), the Russian-born British pianist Benno Moiseiwitsch. She took some further lessons from him and he persuaded her to move to London and teach there, effectively working as his assistant. They had intended to establish a piano school together, but the plans were abandoned due to Moiseiwitsch's increasingly heavy international concert schedule.

Her private pupils included (in oldest to youngest order) Malcolm Sargent (who lodged with her for many years), Alan Bush, William Busch, David Ellenberg (conductor at the Unity Theatre), Mary and Geraldine Peppin, Roger Sacheverell Coke, John Kuchmy and James Gibb. Alan Bush remembered her as "an absolutely systematic and devastating teacher of the piano [who] taught me the Leschetizky method systematically". From 1946 she was associated with the Surrey College of Music.

== Royal tutor ==
However, by far her most famous pupils (if perhaps less distinguished pianistically) were the Princesses Elizabeth and Margaret. Elizabeth began lessons aged eight in 1934 and Margaret aged seven in 1937. The lessons, which were held at 145 Piccadilly, continued into the mid-1940s. Another of her royal pupils was the exiled Prince George Chavchavadze of Russia.
