= John Kennedy (cellist) =

British cellist

John Kennedy (30 December 1922 – 9 February 1980) was a British cellist who had significant associations with Australia, where he worked in the latter part of his life and where he died. He was the father of the violinist Nigel Kennedy.

John Kennedy was born in London. His parents were Australians, the cellist Lauri Kennedy and the pianist Dorothy Kennedy. He studied at the Royal Academy of Music (RAM). At age 24, he became first cello with the Liverpool Philharmonic Orchestra, making him the youngest principal in Great Britain. He joined the Sydney Symphony Orchestra in 1949, as principal, where he performed as soloist in such works as the Elgar Cello Concerto under Otto Klemperer.

He taught at the New South Wales Conservatorium of Music for two years and appeared in concerts for Musica Viva Australia. In 1952, he toured New Zealand as part of the Llewellyn-Kennedy Piano Trio with the violinist Ernest Llewellyn and the pianist Scylla Stoner - who was billed as "Scylla Kennedy", John's first wife.

He returned to the UK, where he was principal cello at Covent Garden. He later became the principal cellist with the Royal Philharmonic Orchestra under Sir Thomas Beecham. He was the first person to perform a cello concerto at the Edinburgh Festival.

He returned to Australia as senior cello lecturer at the University of Melbourne Conservatorium. When he left the UK, he ended his marriage with Scylla Stoner. When they divorced he was not aware that Scylla was pregnant by him, and she later gave birth to his son, the violinist Nigel Kennedy (born 28 December 1956). His mother wanted to teach Nigel to play a string instrument, but ahe chose the violin because she did not want a cello in the house as a reminder of John Kennedy. John and Nigel Kennedy did not meet until Nigel was 11. John married the Welsh soprano Joan Dargavel, and had more children (Nigel's half-siblings), including the bassist Debbie Kennedy and the cellist Laurien Kennedy, who won the 1978 ABC Young Performers Award. John and Joan divorced in 1975. He had a fourth child in 1976, violinist, Erica Kennedy (1st violinist in the Flinders String Quartet). He continued teaching, playing, and broadcasting in Australia until he retired in 1979 due to ill health.

John Kennedy died of chronic liver disease in 1980, at Box Hill, Melbourne.

== Sources ==
- Nigel Kennedy: I didn’t want to be the Des O’Connor of the violin
