= Scharwenka =

Scharwenka is a surname. Notable people with the surname include:

- (Ludwig) Philipp Scharwenka (1847–1917), German composer and music teacher
- (Franz) Xaver Scharwenka (1850–1924), Polish-German pianist, composer, and teacher
  - Klindworth-Scharwenka Conservatory (German: Klindworth-Scharwenka-Konservatorium)
- Marianne Scharwenka, née Stresow (1856–1918), German violinist, wife of Philipp
