= Rubbra =

Rubbra is a surname. Notable people with the surname include:

- Arthur Rubbra (1903–1982), English engineer
- Edmund Rubbra (1901–1986), British composer
