= Theodor Leschetizky =

Austrian-Polish pianist, teacher, and composer (1830–1915)

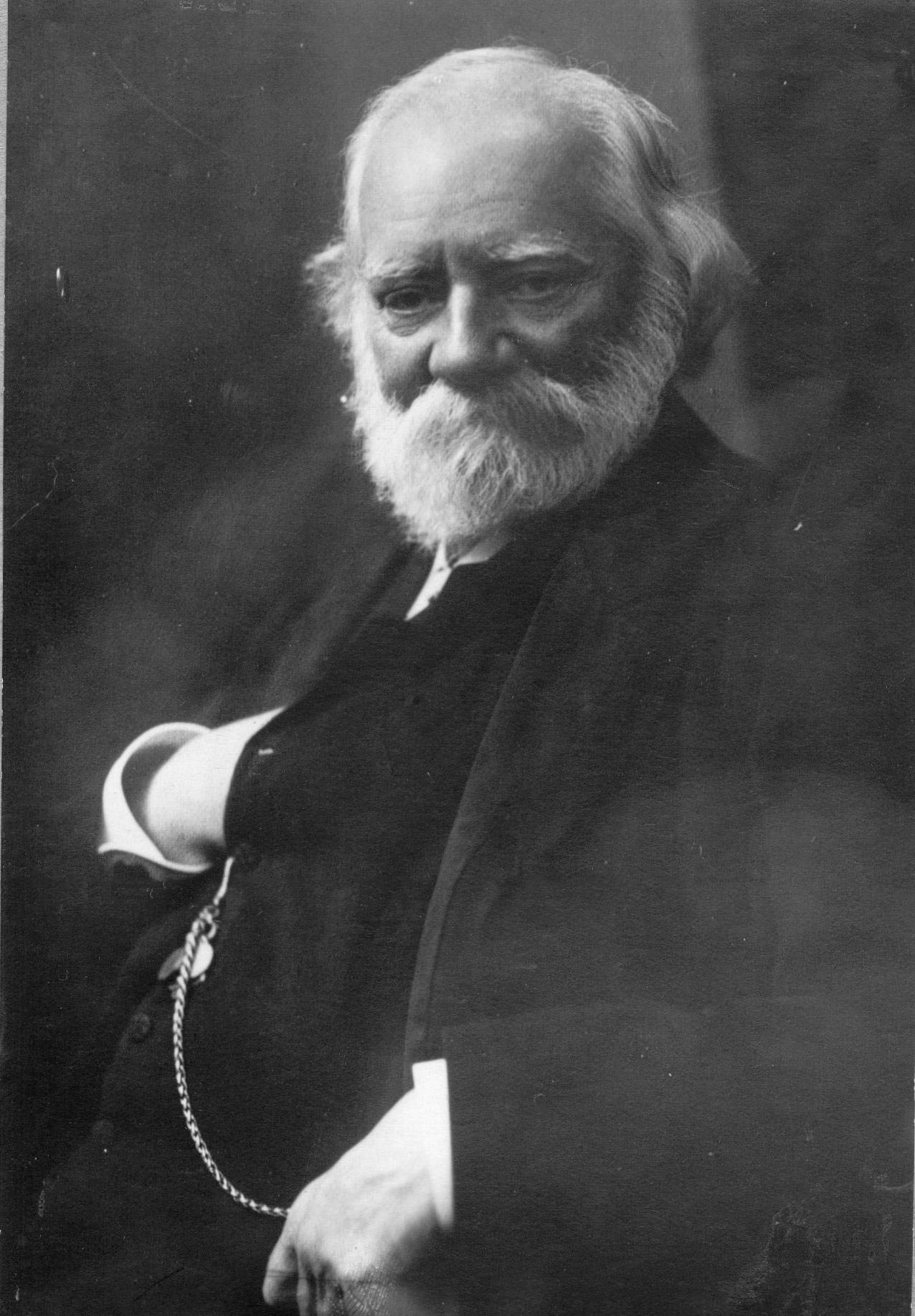
- Born: 22 June 1830; Landshut, Austrian Galicia, Austria-Hungary
- Died: 14 November 1915 (aged 85); Dresden, Kingdom of Saxony, German Empire
- Burial place: Vienna Central Cemetery
- Occupations: Pianist; composer

Theodor Leschetizky (sometimes spelled Leschetitzky; Polish: Teodor Leszetycki; 22 June 1830 – 14 November 1915) was a Polish pianist, professor, and composer active in Austria-Hungary. He was born in Łańcut in the Kingdom of Galicia and Lodomeria, then a crown land of the Habsburg domain. A well-regarded teacher, his many students included Ignaz Friedman, Ignacy Jan Paderewski, and Artur Schnabel.

== Life ==
Theodor Leschetizky was born on 22 June 1830 at the estate of the family of Count Potocki in Łańcut, in what was then Austrian Galicia and is now southeastern Poland. Joseph Leschetizky, his father, was a gifted pianist and music teacher of Viennese birth and Czech origin. His mother Teresa Ullmann was a Polish gifted singer of German origin. His father gave him his first piano lessons and then took him to Vienna to study with Carl Czerny. At age eleven, he performed a Czerny piano concerto in Landshut, with Franz Xaver Wolfgang Mozart, the son of Wolfgang Amadeus Mozart, conducting. At the age of fifteen he started to tutor his first students. By the age of eighteen he was a well-known virtuoso in Vienna and beyond. His composition teacher was Simon Sechter, an eminent professor who was the teacher of many other successful musicians.

At the invitation of his friend Anton Rubinstein, he went to St. Petersburg to teach in the court of the Grand Duchess Yelena Pavlovna. Remaining there from 1852 to 1877, he was head of the piano department and one of the founders of the St. Petersburg Conservatory of Music in 1862. While in Russia he married one of his most famous students, Anna Essipova, the second of his four wives, with whom he had two children; one of them was his daughter, the well-known singer and teacher, Theresa, the other was his son Robert.

In 1878 he returned to Vienna and began teaching there, creating one of the most eminent private piano schools in the world. Promising pianists flocked to his villa in the Währing Cottage District on Karl-Ludwig-Straße, Vienna, coming from all over the world, with a great many from the United States, among them singer Clara Clemens, the daughter of Mark Twain.

Leschetizky’s student and assistant Marie Prentner wrote three books with him, publishing the first in 1903: Leschetizky's Fundamental Principles of Piano Technique; The Leschetizky Method; and The Modern Pianist. From 1904 to 1908, he was assisted by another student, Ethel Newcomb, an experience which proved a fertile ground for research for her 1921 book, Leschetizky as I Knew Him. Concert pianist and teacher Edwin Hughes was his assistant in 1909 and 1910.

He taught until the age of 85, thereafter leaving for Dresden, where he died on 14 November 1915. He was later buried at the Vienna Central Cemetery.

== Leschetizky's descendants ==
He was survived by a son, Robert (Dresden), whose family returned to Bad Ischl after his death. His descendants still live in Bad Ischl and there is a Leschetizky Villa on Leschetizky-Straße, the summer resort where he often vacationed with his friend Johannes Brahms.

Leschetizky had a granddaughter, Ilse Leschetizky (1910–1997), who was a distinguished pianist and teacher. One of her daughters, Margret Tautschnig, continues the Leschetizky tradition with the Leschetizky-Verein Österreich in Bad Ischl. This organisation was co-founded by the Belgian pianist Peter Ritzen.

== Leschetizky the composer ==
Leschetizky composed over a hundred characteristic piano pieces, two operas: Die Brüder von San Marco and Die Erste Falte, thirteen songs and a one-movement piano concerto. Opus numbers were given to 49 works.

Although his piano pieces are primarily smaller works in the salon music vein, they are expressively lyrical on the one hand while exploiting the piano's technical capabilities to great effect on the other. Most of his music has been out of print since the early twentieth century except for the Andante Finale, Op. 13 (a paraphrase for piano left hand on the famous sextet from the opera Lucia di Lammermoor by Donizetti); and Les deux alouettes, Op. 2, No. 1.

== Leschetizky the teacher ==
His most important legacy is as the main teacher of numerous great pianists such as Ignacy Jan Paderewski, Aline van Barentzen, Ernesto Bérumen, Alexander Brailowsky, Agnes Gardner Eyre, Ignaz Friedman, Ossip Gabrilowitsch, Florence Parr Gere, Katharine Goodson, Mark Hambourg, Helen Hopekirk, Mieczysław Horszowski, Edwin Hughes, Frank La Forge, Mabel Lander, Ethel Leginska, Marguerite Melville Liszniewska, Frank Merrick, Benno Moiseiwitsch, Elly Ney, Marie Novello, John Powell, Auguste de Radwan, Zudie Harris Reinecke, Gertrude Ross, Jadwiga Sarnecka, Artur Schnabel, Richard Singer, Józef Śliwiński, Bertha Tapper, Isabelle Vengerova, Maria Wilhelmj, Vita Witek, Paul Wittgenstein, Fannie Bloomfield Zeisler, Agnes Hope Pillsbury, Leon Erdstein and many others.

== Recordings ==
- In February 1906, Leschetizky recorded twelve piano rolls for Welte-Mignon, including seven of his own compositions.
- Piano Concerto, Piano works - Hubert Rutkowski, piano Acte Préalable AP0191, © 2008 (CD)
- Piano Concerto, op.9; Overture to "Die erste Falte/ Contes de Jeunesses" - Peter Ritzen, piano Naxos Records 8.223803 (CD)
- Piano Works (with the famous left hand piece Andante Finale, op.13) - Peter Ritzen, piano Naxos Records 8.223525 (CD)
- Leschetizky Piano Music Centaur CRC2319

== Bibliography ==
- Theodor Leschetizky, Das Klavierwerk. Cologne: Haas 2000.

== See also ==
- List of music students by teacher: K to M § Theodor Leschetizky
