= Benno Moiseiwitsch =

Russian and British pianist (1890–1963)

Benno Moiseiwitsch CBE
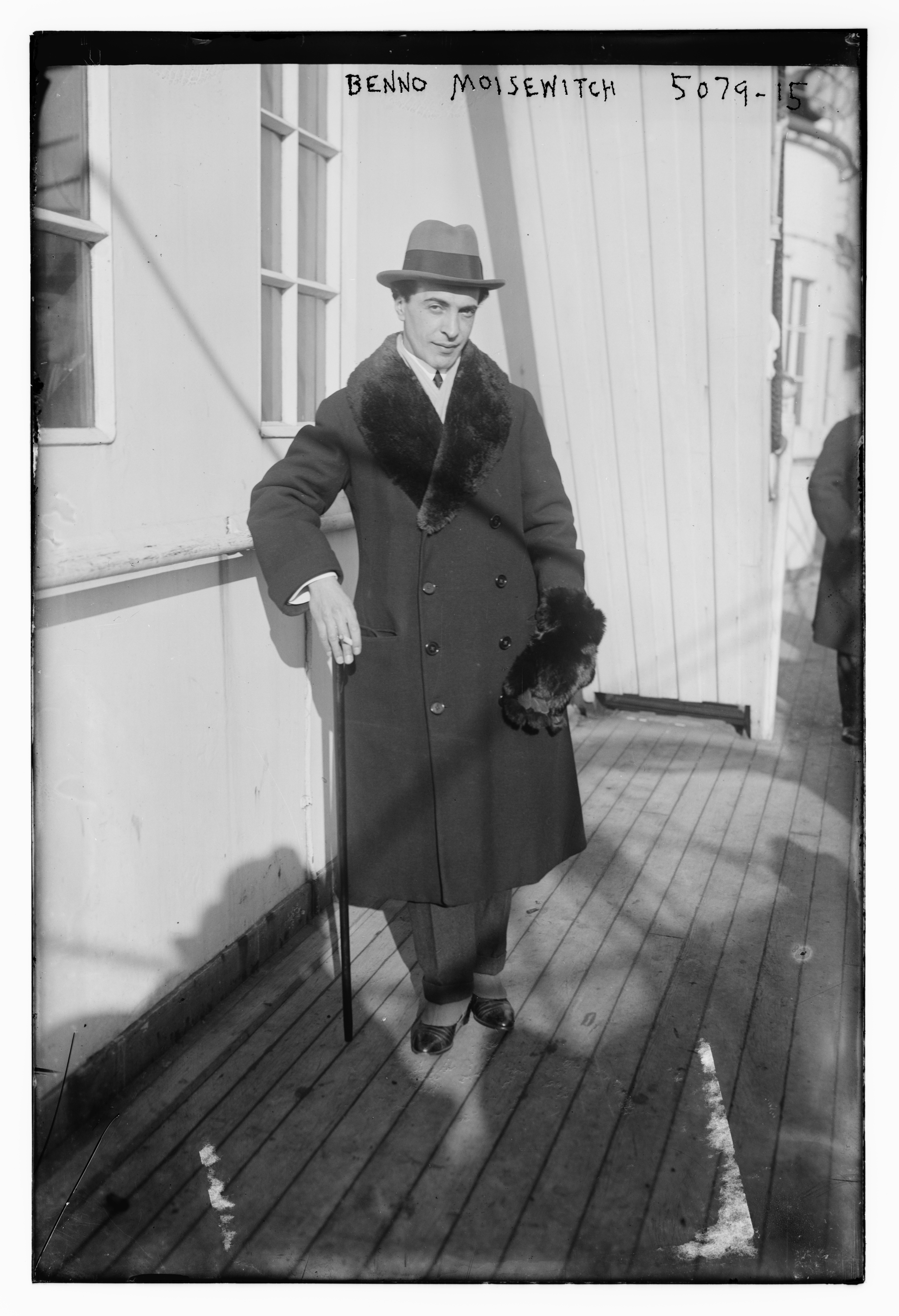
- Moiseiwitsch in 1920
- Born: 22 February 1890; Odessa, Kherson Governorate, Russian Empire (today part of Ukraine)
- Died: 9 April 1963 (aged 73)
- Occupation: Pianist
- Spouse: Daisy Kennedy (m. 1914, divorced)
- Children: 3, including Tanya

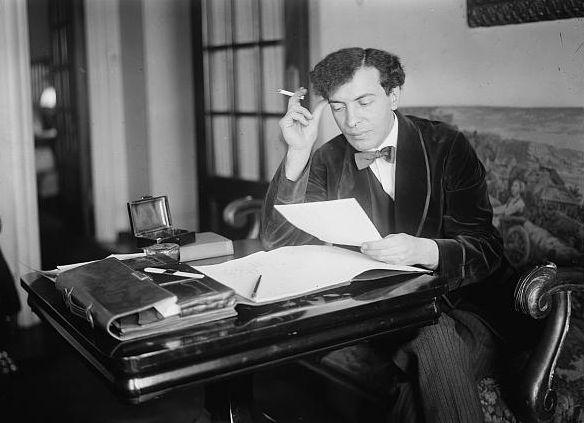

Benno Moiseiwitsch CBE (22 February 1890 – 9 April 1963) was a Russian and British pianist.

== Biography ==
Moiseiwitsch was born to Jewish parents in Odessa, Kherson Governorate, Russian Empire, and began his studies at age seven with Dmitry Klimov at the Odessa Music Academy. He won the Anton Rubinstein Prize when he was just nine years old. He studied with Theodor Leschetizky in Vienna from 1904 to 1908, then joined his own family in England, making his English debut at Reading in 1908, his London debut the following year. While in Dublin during the war he met another Leschetizky student, Mabel Lander, and they began plans to establish a piano school together in London that would use the Leschetizky method. But the plans had to be abandoned due to Moiseiwitsch's increasingly heavy international concert schedule. He toured the United States (first in 1919), Australia, India, Japan, and South America. Moiseiwitsch was invited by Director Josef Hofmann to teach at the Curtis Institute of Music in 1927. He settled in England and took British citizenship in 1937.

Moiseiwitsch was appointed a Commander of the Order of the British Empire (CBE) in 1946 for services to music during the Second World War, having performed hundreds of recitals for servicemen and charities.

He married Daisy Kennedy, an Australian concert violinist, and had two daughters, the set designer Tanya Moiseiwitsch and Sandra (1922-1996). He and his second wife Anita had a son, noted New Zealand National Radio broadcaster Boris Moiseiwitsch.

He was a friend of Nikolai Medtner and commissioned the Piano Concerto No. 3 "Ballade" (1940–43). Like his friend Mark Hambourg he was a member of the Savage Club. He was also a skilled wrestler, and arranged several friendly matches with the critic Ralph Hill, also a wrestling enthusiast.

== Playing style ==
Moiseiwitsch was particularly known for his interpretations of the late Romantic repertoire, especially the works of Sergei Rachmaninoff (who was an admirer of his playing and referred to Moiseiwitsch as his "spiritual heir") and Robert Schumann, whose piano music gave Moiseiwitsch "more emotional and spiritual satisfaction than anyone else." At the piano, Moiseiwitsch was noted for his elegance, poetry, lyrical phrasing, brilliance, rhythmic freedom, and relaxed virtuosity.

He made recordings for the His Master's Voice starting in the 78RPM shellac era, continuing with long-playing records and into the early stereo era. His distinctive style can be heard in his recording of Rachmaninoff's Rhapsody on a Theme of Paganini and the Barcarolle, Ballade No. 4 and Nocturne, Op. 62 of Frédéric Chopin. In 1950 critic and musicologist Irving Kolodin said about the Ballade in F minor of Chopin played by Moiseiwitsch: "A featherweight touch in the opening section of this work, an apt feeling for its "once upon a time" narrative quality give Moiseiwitsch pre-eminence among present day interpreters...", thus summing up the sensitivity of the playing by Benno Moiseiwitsch. He worked meticulously and amicably as a chamber musician, including in Rachmaninoff's Trio Élégiaque and Cello Sonata in G minor. American critic Harold C. Schonberg praised Moiseiwitsch's formidable technique and free approach to the music, adding that such freedom was "always tempered by impeccable musicality."

== Discography ==
A comprehensive list of Moiseiwitsch's discography does not exist, but much of his recorded output is available on CD. Although there are duplicates of his recordings on various labels, they differ in sound quality because of the different restoration techniques employed by each of the companies.

=== Releases by Naxos Records Historical ===
- Vol. 1: Schumann: Kinderszenen / Mussorgsky: Pictures at an Exhibition (8.110668)
- Vol. 2: Liszt: Hungarian Rhapsody No. 2 / Weber (arr. Tausig): Rondo Brillante, etc. (8.110669)
- Vol. 3: Tchaikovsky: Piano Concertos Nos. 1 and 2 (8.110655)
- Vol. 4: Rachmaninoff: Piano Concertos Nos. 1 and 2 and Rhapsody on a Theme of Paganini (8.110676)
- Vol. 5: Grieg / Saint-Saëns: Piano Concertos / List: Hungarian Fantasy (8.110683)
- Vol. 6: Delius: Piano Concerto / Ravel: Jeux d'eau, etc. (8.110689)
- Vol. 7: Rachmaninoff: Preludes / Medtner: Sonata, etc. (8.110675)
- Vol. 8: Beethoven: Piano Concertos Nos. 3 and 5 (8.110776)
- Vol. 9: Beethoven: Piano Sonatas Nos. 8, 14, and 21 (8.111115)
- Vol. 10: Acoustic Recordings 1916–1925 (8.111116)
- Vol. 11: Chopin: Piano Works (1917–1927) (8.111117)
- Vol. 12: Chopin: 24 Preludes / Ballades / Fantaisie-Impromptu (1938–1952) (8.111118)
- Vol. 13: Chopin: Recordings 1939–1952 (8.110770)
- Beethoven/Brahms/Franck: Violin Sonatas (Heifetz) — Moiseiwitsch accompanies Jascha Heifetz in Beethoven's Violin Sonata No. 9 in A major, Op. 47

=== Releases by APR ===
- The complete Rachmaninov recordings 1937–43 (APR 5505)
- Benno Moiseiwitsch plays Saint-Saëns Concerto 2 / Grieg Concerto / Liszt Hungarian Fantasia (APR 5529)
- Benno Moiseiwitsch plays Beethoven Volume 1 (APR 5530)
- Benno Moiseiwitsch plays Beethoven Volume 2 (APR 5610)
- Benno Moiseiwitsch plays Chopin Volume 1 (APR 5575)
- Benno Moiseiwitsch plays Chopin Volume 2 (APR 5576)
- Benno Moiseiwitsch plays Tchaikovsky

=== Releases by Pearl ===
- Benno Moiseiwitsch – The Complete Acoustic Recordings (0142)
- Benno Moiseiwitsch Vol 1 – Brahms, Mendelssohn, et al. (9135)
- Moiseiwitsch In Recital (9192)

=== Releases by Testament ===
- Benno Moiseiwitsch Plays Schumann & Brahms (1023)
- Chopin, Schumann, Weber, Medtner, et al. / Benno Moiseiwitsch (1196)
- Delius: Concertos for Violin and Piano, Legende, etc. (1014)
- Moiseiwitsch – Schumann, Grieg: Piano Concertos (1187)
- Benno Moiseiwitsch 3-CD set – Beethoven Piano sonata No. 21 / Schumann – Kreisleriana Op. 16 / Mussorgsky – Pictures at an Exhibition / Beethoven Piano Concerto No. 5 in E flat, Op. 73 / Rachmaninov – Rhapsody on a theme of Paganini, Op. 43 /Chopin – Ballade No. 3 in A flat, Op. 47 / Moiseiwitsch in Interview (SBT31509)

=== Other releases ===
- Moisewitsch In Recital – Chopin, Stravinsky, Liszt (ARBITER 120)
- Rachmaninov Piano Concerto No.2, Beethoven Piano Concerto No.5 (BBC LEGENDS 4074)
- Benno Moiseiwitsch (Great Pianists of the 20th Century series by Phillips)
- Benno Moiseiwitsch (GHCH 2326 Label: Guild Historical) — Live recordings of Delius's Piano Concerto and Rachmaninov's Rhapsody on a Theme of Paganini from the Proms in 1955. Also included is a studio recording of Rachmaninov's 2nd Piano Concerto also from 1955.

== Bibliography ==
- Moiseiwitsch, Maurice. Moiseiwitsch, biography of a Concert Pianist, London: F.Muller, 1965.

== Filmography ==
- Georges Cziffra (EMI DVD Classics 4906819) — Bonus footage of Moiseiwitsch playing Wagner-Liszt: Overture to Tannhauser
- The Art of Piano: Great Pianists of the 20th Century — Moiseiwitsch plays Rachmaninov's Piano Concerto No.2 (excerpt), Prelude in B minor Op.32 (the beginning contains commentary) and speaks about a conversation he had with Rachmaninov.
