= Kraven the Hunter (soundtrack) =

Kraven the Hunter (Original Motion Picture Soundtrack)

Film score by Benjamin Wallfisch, Evgueni Galperine, and Sacha Galperine
- Released: December 13, 2024
- Studio: Sony Scoring Stage
- Genre: Film score
- Length: 60:09
- Label: Sony Classical

Benjamin Wallfisch chronology
Alien: Romulus (Original Motion Picture Soundtrack) (2024)	Kraven the Hunter (Original Motion Picture Soundtrack) (2024)	Wolf Man (2025)

Evgueni Galperine and Sacha Galperine chronology
Block Pass (2024)	Kraven the Hunter (Original Motion Picture Soundtrack) (2024)	Julian (2025)

Kraven the Hunter (Original Motion Picture Soundtrack) is the soundtrack for the 2024 American superhero film Kraven the Hunter directed by J. C. Chandor, featuring the Marvel Comics character Kraven the Hunter, the sixth installment in Sony's Spider-Man Universe, features an original score composed by Benjamin Wallfisch, Evgueni Galperine, and Sacha Galperine.

The score was released by Sony Classical Records in digital formats on December 13, 2024, in conjunction with the film's release.

== Development ==
By June 2023, Benjamin Wallfisch was revealed to have composed the film's score, who previously scored other comic book films including Shazam! (2019), Hellboy (2019), and The Flash (2023). On December 10, 2024, Evgueni and Sacha Galperine were confirmed as co-composers. The soundtrack album was released on December 13, 2024, by Sony Classical.

== Track listing ==
No.	Title	Artist(s)	Length
1.	"Prison Break"	Benjamin Wallfisch	3:28
2.	"Motherland (Kraven's Theme)"	Evgueni Galperine; Sacha Galperine	2:50
3.	"Three Cards Spread"	Evgueni Galperine; Sacha Galperine	1:31
4.	"Reborn"	Evgueni Galperine; Sacha Galperine	2:22
5.	"Nikolaï"	Evgueni Galperine; Sacha Galperine	1:50
6.	"Sergeï and Dima"	Evgueni Galperine; Sacha Galperine	2:02
7.	"Lullaby"	Evgueni Galperine; Sacha Galperine	2:08
8.	"Kraven's Origin"	Benjamin Wallfisch	2:03
9.	"Calypso"	Evgueni Galperine; Sacha Galperine	4:30
10.	"We Have a Winner"	Benjamin Wallfisch	2:03
11.	"The Threat"	Evgueni Galperine; Sacha Galperine	1:42
12.	"Kidnapped"	Benjamin Wallfisch	9:25
13.	"The Foreigner"	Benjamin Wallfisch	2:07
14.	"Monastery"	Benjamin Wallfisch	7:12
15.	"Forest Hallucination"	Benjamin Wallfisch	2:24
16.	"Final Showdown"	Benjamin Wallfisch	8:42
17.	"Never Fear Death"	Evgueni Galperine; Sacha Galperine	2:07
18.	"It's All Just There For The Taking"	Evgueni Galperine; Sacha Galperine	2:47
19.	"Embrace Who You Really Are"	Evgueni Galperine; Sacha Galperine	2:08
20.	"Kraven the Hunter"	Benjamin Wallfisch	3:06
21.	"I Hunt You"	Benjamin Wallfisch	2:44
Total length:			60:09

== Additional songs ==
Additional songs are featured in the movie:

- "Sign of the Times" by Harry Styles
- "They Can't Take That Away from Me" by Tony Bennett
- "Changes" by Black Sabbath
- "Hymn to Red October" (from the score of the 1990 film The Hunt for Red October) by Basil Poledouris
- "Gruppa Krovi" by Kino
