= Wolf Man (soundtrack) =

Wolf Man (Original Motion Picture Soundtrack)

Film score by Benjamin Wallfisch
- Released: January 17, 2025
- Recorded: 2024
- Studio: AIR Studios, London
- Genre: Film score
- Length: 48:58
- Label: Back Lot Music
- Producer: Benjamin Wallfisch

Benjamin Wallfisch chronology
Kraven the Hunter (2024)	Wolf Man (Original Motion Picture Soundtrack) (2025)	Until Dawn (2025)

Wolf Man (Original Motion Picture Soundtrack) is the soundtrack album to the 2025 film Wolf Man directed by Leigh Whannell. The film score is composed by Benjamin Wallfisch and released under the Back Lot Music label on January 17, 2025.

== Development ==
In December 2024, Benjamin Wallfisch, who previously composed Whannell's The Invisible Man (2020) returned to score Wolf Man. Having liked Wallfisch's score for the former, Whannell suggested something similar to "Denouement" from the film's soundtrack that would close the film on a "big emotional note". The original piece for the climactic sequence had "something kind of spare and haunting for the ending", but Whannell wanted to do the similar approach he did for The Invisible Man. Upon, Whannell's insistence, Wallfisch had composed a new piece for the climactic sequence which the former liked it, and that became "Goodbye".

The score was recorded at the AIR Studios in London, with a 90-piece orchestra from the Chamber Orchestra of London performed the score, conducted by Geoff Alexander and David Kyrstal supervised the orchestration. The sound mixing was completed at the Warner Bros. Studios Burbank.

== Release ==
The soundtrack was released under the Back Lot Music label on January 17, 2025. A vinyl edition, with the album being pressed on an 180-gram LP record is published by Mutant and set to be released on April 25, 2025.

== Reception ==
Peter Debruge of Variety called the score "discordant" and "often indistinguishable" with its creepy noises. Calling it as a "bowel-churning orchestral score", David Rooney of The Hollywood Reporter complimented the music as "its own kind of savage beast". Michael Gingold of Fangoria called it as "occasionally overemphatic but generally shivery score." Jeremy Mathai of /Film called that Wallfisch's score "frequently evokes the imagery of stomping feet chasing after our heroes — to supply the tension". Jake Wilson of The Sydney Morning Herald wrote "Benjamin Wallfisch's lush score giving way to an all-out assault on the eardrums when we enter Blake's physically disordered point of view."

== Track listing ==
No.	Title	Length
1.	"Goodbye"	2:54
2.	"Vista"	3:12
3.	"Encounters"	2:33
4.	"30 Years Later"	2:10
5.	"Crash"	2:42
6.	"Basement"	2:36
7.	"Scars"	2:31
8.	"Door Attack"	2:11
9.	"Helpless"	3:36
10.	"Time to Go"	3:05
11.	"Greenhouse"	1:52
12.	"What Am I Thinking"	1:54
13.	"Wolf Fight"	1:55
14.	"Transformation"	3:33
15.	"He's Back"	4:02
16.	"Wolf Man"	8:12
Total length:		48:58

== Personnel ==
Credits adapted from Film Music Reporter:

- Music composer and producer: Benjamin Wallfisch
- Additional music: Sturdivant Adams, Ian Arber
- Additional programming: David Majzlin
- Music supervisors: Gabe Hilfer, Devoe Yates
- Music editor: Brett 'Snacky' Pierce
- Recording studio: Air Lyndhurst Studios, London
- Recording: Rupert Coulson
- Digital recordist: John Prestage
- Assistant engineer: Rebecca Hordern, Eve Morris
- Score editor: Chris Barrett
- Mixing studio: The Mix Lab, Santa Monica, California
- Mixing: Scott Smith, Benjamin Wallfisch
- Supervising orchestrator: David Kyrstal
- Orchestrators: Patrick Cunningham, Michael J. Lloyd, Evan Rogers, Sebastian Winter, Sturdivant Adams, Ian Arber
- Orchestra: Chamber Orchestra of London
- Orchestra conductor: Geoff Alexander
- Orchestra contractor: Gareth Griffiths
- Music preparation: Jill Streater
- Score co-ordinators: Darrell Alexander, Gareth Griffiths

== Release history ==
Release dates and formats for Wolf Man (Original Motion Picture Soundtrack)
Region	Date	Format(s)	Label	Ref.
Various	January 17, 2025	Digital download; streaming	Back Lot Music	
Various	April 25, 2025	Vinyl	Mutant	
