= It Chapter Two (soundtrack) =

It Chapter Two (Original Motion Picture Soundtrack)

Film score by Benjamin Wallfisch
- Released: August 30, 2019
- Recorded: 2019
- Venue: Los Angeles, California
- Studio: Barbra Streisand Scoring Stage, Sony Pictures Studios; Eastwood Scoring Stage, Warner Bros. Studios
- Genre: Film score
- Length: 1:41:15
- Label: WaterTower Music

Benjamin Wallfisch chronology
Hellboy (2019)	It Chapter Two (2019)	The Invisible Man (Original Motion Picture Soundtrack) (2020)

It Chapter Two (Original Motion Picture Soundtrack) is the score album to the 2019 film It Chapter Two, a follow-up to It (2017). The film had Benjamin Wallfisch who scored for the first film, returning to score for the sequel. The score is "larger and more matured" than the first film, which demanded Wallfisch a 100-piece orchestra from the Hollywood Studio Symphony and 40-member voice choir performing. The album consisting of 45 tracks, were released by WaterTower Music on August 30, 2019, a week before the film's release. It was further released in double vinyl on December 6, 2019.

== Development ==
"I wanted to take the themes, which have become familiar, and part of the storytelling from the first film, and give them the sense that they've gone through 27 years of not just maturing, but developing a complexity that time brings. That was something we tried to mirror in the musical choices."

— Benjamin Wallfisch, on the development of the original themes from the first film into the sequel.

One of the earliest discussion, Wallfisch had with Muschetti, is how to blend new themes and original themes from the first film with "more scale and ambition to reflect the scope of the film". Hence for Chapter Two, Wallfisch used a 100-piece orchestra from the Hollywood Studio Symphony and 40-member vocal choir, and in addition to several new themes, he re-recorded the themes from the first film's score with more "complex and ambitious arrangements" so as to reflect the characters development over the past 27 years, explaining "There was a lot more music required, which really allowed room for the original themes to develop and evolve in a way driven by the emotional complexity of how the Losers Club grapple with inner demons from the past and painful memories, and ultimately unite to confront their biggest fears."

Especially, for the theme of Pennywise, the film had him "vengeful and flagrant" and have a bigger presence in the film. So that "the music had to also reflect that increased darkness, whilst never losing sight of the adventure and emotion that are at the core of the movie". With The Losers Club returning as adults, Wallfisch had the opportunity to give them more emotional potency. as "they're not just kids going through the process of coming together to defeat this evil. We're dealing with adults who have grappled with trauma and are coming together and reforming memories that have been lost." Hence, the score was much more complex, as the visual scale and storytelling and much depth in the second instalment.

Wallfisch further experimented with close-miked solo strings, where he recorded for sequences which are more visceral, as while using the close miked strings "it had much more drama than going with a hundred people playing together". The sonic choices were "counter-intuitive". He used a lot of post-processing of acoustic instruments, which he turned into electronic textures, with the sounds that originated from the orchestra. He recorded the full orchestra scoring within a single day, so as to get all kinds of "completely off-the-wall and very unusual sounds, which then formed the basis of the more experimental parts of the score". A two-week recording was held at the Barbra Streisand Scoring Stage and Warner Bros.' Eastwood Scoring Stage in Los Angeles, California, while the choir was recorded with RSVP Voices in London, which featured several professional choirs around London. He further reprised the children's choir he used in the first film. He did not re-record, but used the original recordings.

== Track listing ==
All music is composed by Benjamin Wallfisch.

It Chapter Two (Original Motion Picture Soundtrack)
No.	Title	Length
1.	"27 Years Later"	2:06
2.	"Memory"	1:40
3.	"Come Home"	2:24
4.	"I Swear, Bill"	1:30
5.	"Beverly Escapes"	2:21
6.	"Henry Bowers"	1:21
7.	"Firefly"	3:09
8.	"Losers Reunited"	0:52
9.	"Echo"	1:44
10.	"Fortune Cookies"	2:11
11.	"You Knew"	1:49
12.	"The Library"	2:07
13.	"Shokopiwah"	3:29
14.	"The Barrens"	1:21
15.	"The Clubhouse"	3:48
16.	"Perfume"	2:36
17.	"Mrs. Kersh"	1:47
18.	"Miss Me, Richie?"	1:24
19.	"Dirty Little Secret (feat. Pennywise)"	1:21
20.	"Silver Bullet"	1:54
21.	"Why Georgie?"	3:45
22.	"Your Hair Is Winter Fire"	3:20
23.	"Eddie and the Leper"	1:50
24.	"Festival Pursuit"	1:06
25.	"Hall of Mirrors"	2:14
26.	"Bar Mitzvah"	1:36
27.	"Bowers Attack"	1:19
28.	"Back to Neibolt"	2:50
29.	"Home At Last"	1:29
30.	"It's Stan"	2:03
31.	"This Is Where It Happened"	2:03
32.	"The Place of It"	1:57
33.	"Artifacts"	3:10
34.	"The Ritual of Chüd"	2:04
35.	"Very Scary"	1:39
36.	"Scary"	1:31
37.	"Not Scary At All"	1:25
38.	"You Lied and I Died"	2:55
39.	"My Heart Burns There Too"	2:30
40.	"Spider Attack"	3:28
41.	"You're All Grown Up"	5:24
42.	"Neibolt Escape"	1:36
43.	"Nothing Lasts Forever"	4:18
44.	"Goodbye"	0:54
45.	"Stan's Letter"	4:18
Total length:		1:41:15

== Reception ==
Zanobard Reviews wrote, "Benjamin Wallfisch's score to IT Chapter Two is very, very good. The album expertly captures the atmosphere of IT and embraces its horrific nature to great effect, and of particular note is the way the composer picks out elements from children's nursery rhymes and then twists and distorts them into something completely petrifying. While the album is a little lengthy (ninety minutes is a long time for a horror score) it is extremely well composed." Jonathan Broxton of Movie Music UK wrote, "with his work on these It movies, Benjamin Wallfisch has created two of the best horror movie scores in many years. To the untrained ear a great deal of the most anarchic dissonance may seem like little more than ear-splitting noise, but I find it all quite fascinating. The creative collisions of sounds, the extended performance techniques, and the allusions to the most challenging and advanced 20th century modernism, are all worthy of significant praise. Not only that, but Wallfisch weaves a half dozen or so identifiable and memorable recurring themes through the score too, and allows them the room to create moments of emotional catharsis when required. The Oranges & Lemons chant for the demented toddlers remains one of the most brilliant and spine-chilling horror music motifs in recent memory. There will be a large number of listeners who simply will not be able to tolerate the onslaught of noise that assails you from the first cue to the last, and those people need to be forewarned that a large portion of this score is very, very, difficult indeed."

Filmtracks.com wrote, "the music on the whole is a noteworthy achievement and an improvement on the prior score, which itself was a more than decent entry in the genre. The album release is once again long. At 103 minutes, there is more than twenty minutes of top-notch lyrical suspense material here to add to similar sequences from It and The Cure for Wellness for a fantastic compilation. Note that these generous Wallfisch albums tend to go out of print on CD within a year or two, so you should not hesitate to appreciate a lossless presentation of this strong genre entry sooner rather than later." Film Music Central wrote "Benjamin Wallfisch clearly put a lot of work into this score, and if it's this scary by itself, I shudder to think what it would be like to hear this music with the film it was written to accompany. If you liked the score for the first It, then you will love the music for It: Chapter Two."

Don Kaye of Den of Geek felt that "Benjamin Wallfisch returns to compose the music for Chapter Two, unfortunately overscoring this one even more than he did Chapter One (one of the first film's few missteps)." Los Angeles Times writer Jen Yamato wrote, "Benjamin Wallfisch's portentous score signaling the way". Rob Slack of BarrieToday.com score is "top shelf, amazingly creepy and wonderful". Mark Kermode of The Guardian wrote that the "expansive score amplifies the sense of adventure".

== Personnel ==
Credits adapted from CD liner notes.

- Music composer and producer – Benjamin Wallfisch
- Musical assistance – Kaitlyn Delle Donne
- Programming – Alex Lu, Antonio Andrade, Jared Fry, Michael Parsons
- Music editing – Lisé Richardson
- Additional music editing – Nate Underkuffler
- Mixing – Benjamin Wallfisch, Scott Michael Smith
- Mixing assistants – Aldo Arechar, Jeff Gartenbaum
- Mastering – Eric Boulanger, Jett Galindo
- Music co-ordinator – Celeste Chada, Jen O'Malley
- Copyist – Booker White, Jill Streater
- Executive producer – Andy Muschietti

Instruments

- Bassoon – Kenneth Munday, William May, Rose Corrigan
- Cello – Ben Lash, Cecilia Tsan, Dennis Karmazyn, Eric Byers, Erika Duke-Kirkpatrick, Evgeny Tonkha, Jacob Braun, Jason Lippmann, Jonathan Karoly, Karen Yeh, Ross Gasworth, Simone Vitucci, Timothy Loo, Vanessa Freebairn-Smith, Helen Altenbach, Andrew Shulman
- Clarinet – Donald Foster, Joshua Ranz, Ralph Williams, Stuart Clark
- Contrabass – Christian Kollgaard, David Parmeter, Drew Dembowski, Edward Meares, Geoffrey Osika, Neil Garber, Nico Abondolo, Oscar Hidalgo, Oscar Meza, Stephanie Payne, Stephen Dress, Thomas Harte, Michael Valerio
- Flute – Geri Rotella, Jennifer Olson, Julie Burkert, Sara Andon
- Harp – Alison Bjorkedal, Marcia Dickstein
- Horn – Adedeji Ogunfolu, Aija Mattson, Amy Rhine, Andrew Bain, Benjamin Jaber, Dylan Hart, Jaclyn Rainey, Kaylet Torrez, Laura Brenes, Mark Adams, Sarah Bach, Steven Becknell, Teag Reaves, David Everson
- Oboe – Claire Brazeau, Jennifer Cullinan, Jessica Pearlman
- Percussion – Edward Atkatz, Kenneth McGrath, Pete Korpela, Wade Culbreath
- Trombone – William Reichenbach, Craig Gosnell, David Rejano Cantero, David Stetson, John Lofton, Lori Stuntz, Phillip Keen, Steven Suminski, Steven Trapani, Steven Holtman, Alexander Iles
- Trumpet – Barry Perkins, Bryce Schmidt, James Wilt, Jon Lewis, Thomas Hooten, Robert Schaer
- Tuba – Blake Cooper, Doug Tornquist
- Viola – Aaron Oltman, Alma Fernandez, Andrew Duckles, Ben Ullery, Carolyn Riley, Carrie Holzman-Little, Corinne Sobolewski, Darrin McCann, David Walther, Zach Dellinger, Joshua Newburger, Karoline Menezes Smith, Luke Maurer, Matthew Funes, Meredith Crawford, Michael Larco, Michael Nowak, Michael Whitson, Shawn Mann, Victor de Almeida, Robert Brophy
- Violin – Akiko Tarumoto, Alyssa Park, Amy Hershberger, Ana Landauer, Andrew Bulbrook, Benjamin Powell, Benjamin Jacobson, Caroline Campbell, Carrie Kennedy, Charlie Bisharat, Darius Campo, Dennis Kim, Elizabeth Johnson, Eun-Mee Ahn, Grace Oh, Hanbyul Lash, Heather Powell, Helen Nightengale, Ina Veli, Irina Voloshina, Jacqueline Brand, Jennifer Fischer, Jennifer Gordon-Levin, Jessica Guideri, Jessica McJunkins, Joel Pargman, Josefina Vergara, Julie Rogers, Ken Aiso, Kerenza Peacock, Kevin Connolly, Kevin Kumar, Laurence Greenfield, Lorand Lokuszta, Lorenz Gamma, Luanne Homzy, Lucia Micarelli, Maia Jasper-White, Marisa Sorajja, Max Karmazyn, Natalie Leggett, Nathan Cole, Neil Samples, Paul Henning, Phillip Levy, Radu Pieptea, Rafael Rishik, Roberto Cani, Roger Wilkie, Sara Parkins, Sarah Thornblade, Serena McKinney, Shalini Vijayan, Songa Lee, Stephanie Yu, Tamara Hatwan, Yelena Yegoryan, Tereza Stanislav
- Vocals – Cora Nielsen, Eitan Puchalt, Elodie Barker, Jacob Grahame-Smith, Jessica Rau, Joshua Grahame-Smith, Kaden Chea, Riley Holmes, Ruby Eusebio, Tytan Benford

Soloists

- Piano solos – Benjamin Wallfisch
- Vocal – Elodie Barker

Choir

- Choir – RSVP Voices
- Conductor – Arturo Rodriguez, Rob Johnston
- Contractor – Rob Johnston, Jasper Randall
- Recording – Jake Jackson

Orchestra

- Orchestra – The Hollywood Studio Symphony
- Orchestration – David Krystal, David Slonaker, Jon Kull, Peter Bateman
- Concertmaster – Belinda Broughton
- Contractor – Peter Rotter
- Recording – Scott Michael Smith
- Pro Tools operator – Alex Ferguson, Chris Barrett, Larry Mah

Management

- Executive in charge of music – Jason Linn (WaterTower Music), Erin Scully, Kim Baum (New Line Cinema)
- Music business affairs – Ari Taitz, John F.X. Walsh
- Art direction – Sandeep Sriram
