= Annabelle: Creation (soundtrack) =

Annabelle: Creation (Original Motion Picture Soundtrack)

Film score by Benjamin Wallfisch
- Released: August 4, 2017
- Recorded: 2017
- Studios: Eastwood Scoring Stage, Warner Bros. Studios, Burbank; 5 Cat Studios, Los Angeles
- Genre: Film score
- Length: 53:25
- Label: WaterTower Music
- Producer: Benjamin Wallfisch

Benjamin Wallfisch chronology
Bitter Harvest (2017)	Annabelle: Creation (2017)	It (2016)

Annabelle: Creation (Original Motion Picture Soundtrack) is the film score to the 2017 film Annabelle: Creation directed by David F. Sandberg; the fourth instalment in The Conjuring Universe and the sequel to Annabelle (2014). Benjamin Wallfisch composed the score which was released under the WaterTower Music label on August 4, 2017.

== Background ==
Benjamin Wallfisch composed the score for Annabelle: Creation, replacing the predecessor's composer and a recurrent franchise veteran Joseph Bishara, owing to Sandberg's involvement; he and Sandberg previously worked together on Lights Out (2016). Wallfisch added that Sandberg had an understanding of music, which provided him a lot of freedom to think outside the box and experiment. He was instructed to use acoustic instruments, since the film was set in the 1950s, everything needed to felt authentic to the time period. The use of dusty toy instruments supplemented the huge orchestra; one particular toy being the Jaymar toy piano which was "the kind of instrument you might catch Annabelle herself playing". Sandberg used music from The Shining, one of his personal favorite film scores, as temp tracks and wanted Wallfisch to reference it for the music. Ensuring that the sounds should not be digital, the team used a real orchestra with analog music to make it a classic score.

== Reception ==
According to Jonathan Broxton of Movie Music UK, "Annabelle: Creation is not really a soundtrack one can ‘enjoy’. It has one purpose, and one purpose only – to make a doll possessed by an evil spirit seem utterly terrifying to those watching the film – and under those criteria, the score is an unqualified success. Wallfisch's technique, use of avant-garde compositional methods, and intricate use of the orchestra, is enormously impressive." James Southall of Movie Wave called it as "really deeply unpleasant music and while I'm sure it's exactly what the director wanted and the film needed, it doesn't function as a piece of entertainment on an album: it's got so much dissonance, made up of so many well-worn devices that I just can't take any pleasure from it." Michael Hollands of Sound of the Movies wrote "If you enjoy creepy music and dissonance, then you are likely to be attracted to this album as well." Justin Lowe of The Hollywood Reporter and Peter Debruge of Variety called the score to be "eerie" and "dissonant". Tara Brady of The Irish Times summarized, "composer Benjamin Wallfisch makes with the bass." Northwest Arkansas Democrat Gazette called it a "deafening score".

== Track listing ==
No.	Title	Length
1.	"Creation"	3:42
2.	"The Mullins Family"	0:43
3.	"A New Home"	1:28
4.	"Bee's Room"	3:01
5.	"Annabelle Awakened"	2:18
6.	"Bunkmates"	1:01
7.	"Shadows and Sheets"	1:25
8.	"Bee's Photo"	1:21
9.	"Puppets and Mischief"	1:16
10.	"Your Soul"	2:48
11.	"Avatars"	1:48
12.	"Demon Fishing"	2:47
13.	"The Possession"	1:44
14.	"Linda's Suspicion"	0:45
15.	"Samuel's Death"	2:26
16.	"Our Beloved Bee"	3:51
17.	"Jannabelle"	2:58
18.	"Transformation"	1:29
19.	"Demonquake"	2:36
20.	"Police"	1:37
21.	"The House is Blessed"	1:42
22.	"Adoption"	1:08
23.	"Conduit"	1:44
24.	"You Are My Sunshine" (Charles McDonald)	2:51
Total length:		48:29

== Personnel ==
Credits adapted from WaterTower Music:

- Music composer and producer – Benjamin Wallfisch
- Recording – Joel Iwataki
- Score recordist – Tom Hardisty
- Mix recordist – Vincent Cirilli
- Mixing – Joel Iwataki, John Traunweiser
- Mastering – Stephen Marsh
- Score editor – Nate Underkuffler
- Technician – Max Sandler
- Score coordinator – Celeste Chada
- Soundtrack coordinator – Kim Baum
- Copyist – Booker White
- Art direction – Sandeep Sriram

Orchestra

- Orchestra – Hollywood Studio Symphony
- Orchestrator – David Krystal
- Conductor – Tim Williams
- Contractor – Peter Rotter
- Concertmaster – Belinda Broughton

Instruments

- Bass trombone – Bill Reichenbach
- Bassoon – Samantha Duckworth, William May, Rose Corrigan
- Cello – Andrew Shulman, Cecilia Tsan, Dennis Karmazyn, Erika Duke-Kirkpatrick, Evgeny Tonkha, Kim Scholes, Jacob Braun, John Walz, Paula Hochhalter, Richard Altenbach, Timothy Loo, Trevor Handy, Vanessa Freebairn-Smith, Helen Altenbach, Steve Erdody
- Clarinet – Stuart Clark
- Contrabass – Drew Dembowski, Edward Meares, Michael Valerio, Stephen Dress, Nico Abondolo
- Flute – Geri Rotella
- Harp – Marcia Dickstein
- Horn – Amy Rhine, Amy Sanchez, Katelyn Faraudo, Steven Becknell, Andrew Bain
- Tenor trombone – Phillip Keen, Alexander Iles
- Trumpet – Christopher Still, Thomas Hooten
- Tuba – Gary Hickman
- Viola – Alma Fernandez, Brian Dembow, David Walther, Zach Dellinger, Matthew Funes, Meredith Crawford, Shawn Mann, Victor DeAlmeida, Robert Brophy
- Violin – Ana Landauer, Andrew Bulbrook, Eun-Mee Ahn, Grace Oh, Helen Nightengale, Irina Voloshina, Jessica Guideri, Josefina Vergara, Katia Popov, Kevin Connolly, Kevin Kumar, Lisa Liu, Lorenz Gamma, Luanne Homzy, Lucia Micarelli, Maya Magub, Natalie Leggett, Neil Samples, Phillip Levy, Roberto Cani, Roger Wilkie, Sarah Thornblade, Serena McKinney, Songa Lee, Tamara Hatwan, Alyssa Park
