= Twisters (score) =

Twisters (Original Motion Picture Score)

Film score by Benjamin Wallfisch
- Released: August 2, 2024
- Recorded: 2024
- Studio: MGM Scoring Stage, Sony Pictures Studios
- Genre: Film score
- Length: 55:16
- Label: Back Lot Music
- Producer: Benjamin Wallfisch

Benjamin Wallfisch chronology
| The Flash (Original Motion Picture Soundtrack) (2023) | Twisters (Original Motion Picture Score) (2024) | Alien: Romulus (Original Motion Picture Soundtrack) (2024) |

Twisters (Original Motion Picture Score) is the score album to the 2024 film Twisters, directed by Lee Isaac Chung from the story and screenplay by Joseph Kosinski and Mark L. Smith, respectively; a standalone sequel to Twister (1996), the film stars Daisy Edgar-Jones, Glen Powell and Anthony Ramos amongst others. The film score is composed by Benjamin Wallfisch and released through Back Lot Music on August 2, 2024.

== Development ==
In April 2024, it was announced that Benjamin Wallfisch would compose the score for Twisters in his first association with Chung. He was a fan of the predecessor, and its musical score composed by Mark Mancina. The sequel had a different story and tone while taking the core elements and scale of predecessor, he also wanted it to be more emotional and connect with the characters as well. Though it was quite challenging, the discussions with Chung had made him clear on how to score it in a way. The score for Kate's character had to balance on the way she senses the weather as a sixth sense and also coming to terms with a tragedy that affected her relationships. Her theme was mostly about that wonderment, and was composed with an intricate piano, interlocked with arpeggiated material that signified the idea of rain.

During the music discussions, Wallfisch asked Chung on how the music should be repetitive but they are played upside down or in some way changed, which was the same way as "there's this extraordinary moment when a tornado is formed and touches down where all the conditions have to be perfect, but no one fully understands how they come together." The material was improvised and free, in contrast to Kate's theme that was more about her interpersonal relationship and how she overcomes the tragedy, it also reflected in the other themes. Wallfisch wanted to capture the tone of Americana through the instrumentation and music choices in the first half. Later, he composed themes for the different storm chasing groups where all of the tornadoes needed their own unique character as the story progresses.

The inspiration for the score is derived from Aaron Copland who was an important influence. From the onset, he wanted to establish the feel of Oklahoma where he tried to lean into the open harmonies and optimism, and while there are country music elements, he did not want to mimic those songs and let it as standalone material. Hence, Copland's works served as a subtle choice for the instrumentation process. Guitarist George Doering was a primary contributor, performing the country instruments—banjos and guitars from the region—in the first half and transitions to electric guitars in the second half as the story progresses.

Wallfisch attributed the score as a homage to John Williams and his musical scores for Steven Spielberg's films. The first theme "Nature's Masterpiece" references achieve the same, while has a subtle touch of Joe Hisaishi's music. He added "It's the idea that this is a work of art that nature creates. It's terrifying and devastating and dangerous, but it's still beautiful."

The score was recorded at the MGM Scoring Stage at Sony Pictures Studios in April 2024, with Wallfisch co-conducting the score with orchestrator Arturo Rodriguez and performed by the Hollywood Studio Symphony. Back Lot Music, the in-house label for Universal Pictures (the film's distributor), published the soundtrack on August 2, 2024, two weeks after the film.

== Critical reception ==
The score was positively received by critics. Filmtracks wrote "Twisters is a competent and enjoyable score that sounds good in almost every corner, but its narrative never quite gets off the ground." Zanobard Reviews assigned 8/10 to the score and wrote "Benjamin Wallfisch's breathtakingly adventurous and unapologetically thunderous work for Twisters makes for a genuinely spectacular listen from start to finish here." Dominic Griffin of Looper wrote "Benjamin Wallfisch's original score is so effective at riding this fence between summer blockbuster and solemn rumination on widespread tragedy". David Rooney of The Hollywood Reporter wrote that Wallfisch's score which threaded with the soundtrack enhanced the feel of Oklahoma. Sonya Alexander of Script Magazine wrote "The swelling score by Benjamin Wallfisch buttresses scenes of distress, chaos, and cataclysm". Ronak Kotecha of The Times of India wrote "Music director Benjamin Wallfisch attempts to give the disaster flick a musical-like treatment, which complements the proceedings".

== Track listing ==
Twisters (Original Motion Picture Score) track listing
| No. | Title | Length |
|---|---|---|
| 1. | "Nature's Masterpiece" | 1:57 |
| 2. | "Team Kate" | 1:19 |
| 3. | "Javi" | 2:49 |
| 4. | "This Car's Gonna Fly" | 5:21 |
| 5. | "Aftermath" | 1:24 |
| 6. | "She Told Us East" | 2:08 |
| 7. | "Shifting Path" | 2:56 |
| 8. | "The Race" | 2:09 |
| 9. | "Complete the Triangle" | 2:49 |
| 10. | "Rodeo" | 4:42 |
| 11. | "After the Storm" | 3:05 |
| 12. | "Tornado Theory" | 2:49 |
| 13. | "Everyone Into Position" | 1:32 |
| 14. | "Refinery" | 3:53 |
| 15. | "Kate's Theme" | 3:52 |
| 16. | "El Reno" | 2:37 |
| 17. | "Twisters" | 6:39 |
| 18. | "You Did It, Kate" | 1:52 |
| 19. | "If You Feel It, Chase It" | 1:23 |
| Total length: | | 55:16 |
