= Mortal Kombat (2021 soundtrack) =

Mortal Kombat (Original Motion Picture Soundtrack)

Film score by Benjamin Wallfisch
- Released: April 16, 2021
- Recorded: 2020–2021
- Studios: Studio 301, Sydney
- Genre: Film score
- Length: 79:40
- Label: WaterTower Music

Benjamin Wallfisch chronology
The Invisible Man (Original Motion Picture Soundtrack) (2020)	Mortal Kombat (2021)	The Starling (2021)

Singles from Mortal Kombat (Original Motion Picture Soundtrack)
- 1. "Techno Syndrome 2021" Released: April 9, 2021; 2. "I Am Scorpion" Released: April 15, 2021

Mortal Kombat (Original Motion Picture Soundtrack) is the score album to the 2021 film Mortal Kombat, based on the video game franchise of the same name and a reboot of the Mortal Kombat film series. Composed by Benjamin Wallfisch, the 24-track album was released on April 16, 2021, by WaterTower Music and is led by two singles: "Techno Syndrome 2021" an experimented track from the eponymous theme song that featured in the video game series' soundtrack by The Immortals was released on April 9, and "I Am Scorpion", a theme for the character Hanzo Hasashi / Scorpion was released on April 15, before the album.

Wallfisch was hired in early 2020 during the film's pre-production, but composition and recording of the film's score took place for more than one year due to COVID-19 pandemic restrictions as each orchestra member had to record individually. On scoring the film, he felt that he was very aware of the responsibility that comes with "scoring a franchise that is deeply embedded in pop culture and with such a passionate fanbase". The music received generally positive reviews.

== Development ==
The film's director Simon McQuoid met with Wallfisch early on in pre-production even before his involvement confirmed in March 2021, which he described it as an "instant connection", adding that "the music in Mortal Kombat is such a big part of it" on using the pre-existing themes from the video game series. This included the "Techno Syndrome" theme composed by the Belgian electronic music group The Immortals. Wallfisch wanted to experiment with the track even before he could score for the film, so that he could reinvent the core material as an orchestral piece. He wrote three to four notes of the melody and some riffs from the original track, while he added creative ways to play with tempo and harmonies.

Reinventing the titlular track was "a great opportunity to embrace the iconic fanbase", according to Wallfisch, who added that he had a lot of responsibility to do so. He played a demo of the track to McQuoid, who called it as "incredible" and felt that "this piece of music made my life so much easier. When talking with actors, I didn't have to pitch them so hard because I had this piece of music for them and they knew exactly what kind of movie we were making." The track was mixed and mastered by Tom Norris, who did the same for the remainder of the score. Wallfisch said that "[Norris] brought such unbelievable power and energy to the track, and it was such a great honor to work with him".

In order to maintain the nostalgia that the fans associate with the series, Wallfisch kept the core themes at the forefront of the compositions, while also distinguishing the film as it is own contemporary piece. Hence he tried using different tones and experimented with the music, to replicate the energy and intensity of the "avant-garde" action sequences and distinguish it with the characters and story, that led to Wallfisch calling it as "the most challenging things he had ever done". Like his previous ventures, electronic dance music has inspired on the film score.

Despite being committed to the project even before release, recording on the film's score had to be delayed due to COVID-19 pandemic lockdown; Wallfisch had to completely restructure the recording process as he was accustomed to working with large orchestras. Wallfisch admitted that the score is written on a large scale for a symphonic sound that demands a 100-piece orchestra and huge choir. The album was recorded at Studio 301 in Sydney and because of the pandemic restrictions, he could only have 35–40 musicians in the room at one time, hence he had to construct the score in small chunks and layer it. Without the live recording experience, he and his team felt more difficult to "capture the energy and coordination of playing in a room together with everyone", resulting in the score to be recorded for over a year, compared to his other films, where he could finish it with six weeks.

== Track listing ==
No.	Title	Length
1.	"Techno Syndrome 2021"	3:06
2.	"Hanzo Hasashi"	7:14
3.	"Lord Raiden"	2:24
4.	"Bi-Han"	2:42
5.	"Shang Tsung"	1:37
6.	"Cole Young"	1:41
7.	"Birthmark"	2:47
8.	"Sonya Blade"	4:23
9.	"Kano v Reptile"	2:59
10.	"Liu Kang"	5:59
11.	"The Great Protector"	2:28
12.	"Sub-Zero"	3:01
13.	"Kung Lao"	3:13
14.	"Origins"	3:08
15.	"Kabal"	2:59
16.	"Goro"	2:57
17.	"Arcana"	3:58
18.	"Jax Briggs"	2:34
19.	"The Void"	4:12
20.	"The Tournament"	5:00
21.	"Sub-Zero v Cole Young"	1:18
22.	"I Am Scorpion"	3:15
23.	"We Fight as One"	2:49
24.	"Get Over Here"	3:56
Total length:		79:40

== Reception ==
Film Music Central reviewed that the music for Mortal Kombat is "plenty of action to go around, but also more than enough moments of calm and relative quiet, though it is more often than not the “calm before the storm” type of quiet. There's an impressive amount of balancing going on between the two extremes of loud and quiet."

Jonathan Broxton of Moive Music UK wrote "Benjamin Wallfisch has written a score which exists within the established musical parameters of the game and the genre – something he had to do – and fully embraces the electronica/EDM aspect of that. He then goes out of his way to combine that with writing for orchestra and chorus that is much more sophisticated than it has any right to be, while also incorporating several recognizable recurring thematic ideas [...] While there are certainly parts of Mortal Kombat that will challenge, annoy, or perhaps even outright disturb listeners who are more attuned to more straightforward orchestral writing, there is great deal of it to be thoroughly entertaining indeed." Empire-reviewer Amon Warmann called it as a "clever, energetic score" that gives us "one of the best musical moments of the year in waiting for the perfect time to unleash the iconic opening notes of 'Techno Syndrome' speaks volumes to the respect Mortal Kombat 2021 has for its audience." Blake Goble of Consequence called it as an "intensely sonic score".

Filmtracks.com wrote "Film music collectors will find the fight cues in Mortal Kombat to be insufferably tied to a techno/electronica sound at odds with the orchestral half of the score, but Wallfisch did as well as anyone could have at merging these disparate sounds in a functional whole. The symphonic fantasy moments will rival Shazam!, and the lyricism of some of the character themes is sublime. Most important, however, is the composer's continued recording quality, his mixes vibrant and allowing fantastic spread between each layer. The album is a challenging prospect for any audience due to the score's split personality, but there is intelligence in this music that goes far beyond the pointless muck that most composers would have thrown at this concept's filmmakers."

== Personnel ==
Credits adapted from AllMusic.

- Benjamin Wallfisch – composer, mixing, producer
- Kim Baum – executive in charge of music
- Craig Beckett – engineer
- Elaine Beckett – score coordinator
- Clifford Bradley – music preparation
- Silvio Buchmeier – orchestration
- Matthew Chin – music preparation
- Reuben Cohen – mastering
- Kaitlyn Delle Donne – technical assistance
- Karen Elliott – score coordinator
- Matan Franco – music preparation
- Jared Fry – music preparation, programming
- Jeff Gartenbaum – technical assistance
- Christopher Gordon – conductor
- Kim Green – music clearance
- Jared Haschek – music preparation
- Oliver Jean Jacques – composer
- Alison Johnston – choir master
- Brett Kelly – conductor
- Minh Khuat – composer's assistant
- David Krystal – orchestration
- Jon Kull – orchestration
- Gavin Lurssen – mastering
- Rose Mackenzie-Peterson – pro tools
- Loclan Mackenzie-Spencer – music preparation
- Evan McHugh – mixing
- Liam Moses – pro tools
- Tom Norris – mastering, mixing
- Jen O'Malley – soundtrack coordination
- Alexander Palmer – music preparation
- Alfredo Pasquel – technical assistance
- Tim Ryan – editing
- Ariane Sallis – music preparation
- Katrina Schiller – editing
- Elizabeth Scott – choir master
- Erin Scully – executive in charge of music
- Scott Smith – mixing
- Sandeep Sriram – art direction, producer
- Ari Taitz – music business affairs
- John F.X. Walsh – music business affairs
- Jessica Wells – music preparation
