= Batman music =

Over the course of its history, media adaptations of Batman have generated a wide variety of music produced in connection with both live-action and animated television series, and with the many Batman films.

Music associated with Batman media includes:

== Television ==
- "Batman Theme", theme song of the 1960s series Batman by Neal Hefti.
- Batman: The Animated Series § Music, musical score of the 1990s animated series written by various composers, with the main theme being composed by Danny Elfman.

== Film ==
=== Live-action ===
- Batman (score), album of Danny Elfman's score for the 1989 film
  - Batman (album), album by Prince with songs featured in and inspired by the 1989 film Batman
    - "Batdance", single from the Prince album
- Batman Returns (soundtrack), album of Danny Elfman's score for the 1992 film
  - "Face to Face" (Siouxsie and the Banshees song), song recorded for Batman Returns
- Batman Forever (soundtrack), compilation of songs by various artists from and inspired by the 1995 film
  - "Hold Me, Thrill Me, Kiss Me, Kill Me", song recorded by U2 for Batman Forever
  - "Kiss from a Rose", song recorded by Seal for Batman Forever
- Batman Forever (score), album of Elliot Goldenthal's score for the 1995 film
- Batman & Robin (soundtrack), compilation of songs by various artists from and inspired by the 1997 film
- Batman Begins (soundtrack), album of Hans Zimmer and James Newton Howard's score for the 2005 film
- The Dark Knight (soundtrack), album of Hans Zimmer and James Newton Howard's score for the 2008 film
- The Dark Knight Rises (soundtrack), album of Hans Zimmer's score for the 2012 film
- Batman v Superman: Dawn of Justice (soundtrack), album of Hans Zimmer and Junkie XL's score for the 2016 film
- Justice League (soundtrack), album of Danny Elfman's score for the 2017 film
  - Zack Snyder's Justice League (soundtrack), album of Junkie XL's score for the 2021 director's cut of the film
- The Batman (soundtrack), album of Michael Giacchino's score for the 2022 film
- The Flash (soundtrack), album of Benjamin Wallfisch's score for the 2023 film

=== Animation ===
- Batman: Mask of the Phantasm (soundtrack), album of Shirley Walker's score for the 1993 film
- The Lego Batman Movie (soundtrack), album of Lorne Balfe's score for the 2017 film

== Video games ==
- Music of Batman: Arkham City, albums of the score and songs of the 2011 video game
