= Alien: Romulus (soundtrack) =

Alien: Romulus (Original Motion Picture Soundtrack)

Film score by Benjamin Wallfisch
- Released: August 16, 2024
- Recorded: 2024
- Studios: Abbey Road, London; Angel, London; AIR, London
- Genre: Film score
- Length: 56:56
- Label: Hollywood
- Producers: Benjamin Wallfisch; Sturdivant Adams

Benjamin Wallfisch chronology
Twisters (Original Motion Picture Soundtrack) (2024)	Alien: Romulus (Original Motion Picture Soundtrack) (2024)	Kraven the Hunter (Original Motion Picture Soundtrack) (2024)

Alien: Romulus (Original Motion Picture Soundtrack) is the soundtrack to the 2024 science fiction horror thriller film Alien: Romulus, directed by Fede Álvarez, the seventh installment in the Alien franchise. Benjamin Wallfisch composed the film score which blends orchestral and electronic music and referenced themes and music from previous instalments. The score was released under the Hollywood Records label on August 16, 2024, and is set to be released through vinyl LPs in November 2024.

== Background ==
In March 2024, it was announced that Benjamin Wallfisch would write the score for Romulus in his first collaboration with Álvarez. The score incorporated themes and cues from the Alien films, such as Jerry Goldsmith's score for Alien (1979), James Horner's for Aliens (1986) and the tracks 'Life' and 'We Were Right' by Harry Gregson-Williams (although arranged by Marc Streitenfeld) from Prometheus (2012). (Note: Attributed to multiple references:)

The score began with complete silence, allowing Wallfisch to consider the impact of music and how it could enhance emotional moments without overshadowing them. Wallfisch designed each character's themes to reflect their emotional journey. Rain's theme evolved from a "sunrise theme" to "rain theme" that symbolized her quest for hope and light. The relationship between Rain and her brother Andy was central to the score, which Wallfisch aimed to connect their themes musically; Andy's theme was derived from Rain's theme, which reinforced their emotional ties. He experimented with a combination of chords and layered sounds with tape delays and woodwinds, providing an auditory experience that resonated with the film's themes.

Wallfisch juxtaposed the orchestral themes with electronic sounds to create the blend with a familiar and alien theme. All those themes were interconnected, so that it could share the same thread of the musical DNA. The use of woodwinds was to evoke the vastness of the film's space, while the choir was to explore non-human sounds. A 100-piece of the Chamber Orchestra of London was recorded at Abbey Road Studios in London which were utilized without strict themes allowing a fluid and organic rhythm that matched the film's themes of exploration and danger.

Wallfisch explained, "My love for the original films made it a joy to contribute to this iconic franchise. By immersing myself in the musical legacy of Horner and Goldsmith, the aim was to embody the tone of what came before while creating fresh elements through a fusion of electronics and traditional orchestral textures."

== Release ==
The Alien: Romulus score was released by Hollywood Records on August 16, 2024, alongside the film. The album features 20 tracks from Wallfisch's score heard in the film. In addition to this on November 15, 2024, a vinyl edition of the album was distributed by Mutant and featured six bonus tracks of the film score, packaged in a 240-gram LP record with liner notes from Álvarez and artwork by illustrator Kilian Eng.

== Reception ==
Zanobard Reviews assigned a score of 7.5 out of 10 for the album, stating "Benjamin Wallfisch's fittingly unnerving score for Alien: Romulus tries thematically to have it all, to some pretty superb – but not perfect – results, all said." Richard Lawson of Vanity Fair wrote "Benjamin Wallfisch's turgid, discordantly sentimental score is at its most glaring when Rain and Andy are sharing some moment of emotional angst, strangely maudlin notes in a movie that is otherwise steadfastly cruel to its characters." Space.com wrote "Composer Benjamin Wallfisch's inventive score is another of the absolute highlights of Alien: Romulus, operating within and dancing around thematic cues found in Jerry Goldsmith's symphonic masterpiece in Alien and James Horner's thunderous military tracks from Aliens. But where his genius really excels is in the injection of industrial-edged synthesizer music paired to many of the hardcore action set pieces that fondly reminds us of '90s techno tunes and vintage Nine Inch Nails." James Mottram of NME described it as "a gets-right-under-the-skin score from Benjamin Wallfisch". Kyle Anderson of Nerdist called it as "a big, sweeping, orchestral soundscape that actively calls back Jerry Goldsmith's score from Alien [...] keeping with the aesthetic of the 1970s-style of futurism, a full orchestra and leitmotifs really add an air of classiness. It's a standout, for sure." Chris Evangelista of /Film called it as a "frightening score".

== Track listing ==
Alien: Romulus (Original Motion Picture Soundtrack) track listing
No.	Title	Length
1.	"The Chrysalis"	2:38
2.	"That's Our Sun"	2:55
3.	"Wake Up"	1:40
4.	"Entering Nostromo"	2:52
5.	"Searching"	2:55
6.	"There's Something in the Water"	2:49
7.	"XX121 (Note: This track references Jerry Goldsmith's Main Title from Alien (1979).)"	3:37
8.	"He's Glitchy"	4:27
9.	"Run!"	2:47
10.	"Prometheus Fire (Note: This track references Harry Gregson-Williams's Opening Titles from Prometheus (2012).)"	4:19
11.	"Guns v Acid Blood"	1:33
12.	"The Hive"	1:41
13.	"Andy (Note: This track references Jerry Goldsmith's Main Title from Alien (1979).)"	1:38
14.	"Gravity Purge"	2:13
15.	"Elevator Shaft Attack"	1:22
16.	"Get Away From Her"	4:31
17.	"The Offspring"	6:07
18.	"Collision Warning"	3:35
19.	"Raine"	1:09
20.	"Sleep"	2:08
Total length:		56:56

Bonus tracks
No.	Title	Length
21.	"Lockdown"
22.	"Awakening"
23.	"Romulus Hangar Bay"
24.	"Body Temperature"
25.	"I Have a New Directive"
26.	"The Hive"

== Personnel ==
Credits adapted from Film Music Reporter and Apple Music

- Music composer and producer – Benjamin Wallfisch
- Co-producer – Sturdivant Adams
- Supervising orchestrator – David Krystal
- Orchestrators – David Butterworth, Evan Rogers, Michael J. Lloyd, Jeremy Levy, Sebastian Winter
- Special cello effects – Tristan Schulze
- Orchestra – Chamber Orchestra of London
- Musicians' contractor – Gareth Griffiths
- Assistant contractor – James Marangone
- Orchestra conductor – Chris Egan
- Choir – RSVP Voices
- Choir conductor – Rob Johnston
- Music preparation – Jill Streater, Dan Boardman, Leo Nicholson
- Musical arrangements and programming – Sturdivant Adams, Steve R. Davis, Jared Fry, Tori Letzler, Steffen Thum
- Recording – Rupert Coulson
- Digital recordist – Daniel Hayden
- Score technical engineer – Caleb Cuzner, David Neville, Kyle Waselewski
- Assistant engineer – Neil Dawes, Martin Riley, Jessi McDonald
- Mixing – Eva Reistad
- Additional mixing – Rupert Coulson, Jason LaRocca
- Mastering – Patricia Sullivan
- Music editor – Clint Bennett
- Score editor – Chris Barrett
- Temp music editor – Del Spiva
- Music coordinator – Darrell Alexander

== Charts ==
Chart performance for Alien: Romulus (Original Motion Picture Soundtrack)
Chart (2024)	Peak position
UK Album Downloads (Official Charts)	32
UK Soundtrack Albums (OCC)	16
