= Hullraisers =

British TV sitcom

- Genre: Sitcom
- Based on: Little Mum by: Lital Schwartz; Shai Ben Atar; Liat Shavit; Yoav Gross
- Developed by: Lucy Beaumont
- Written by: Lucy Beaumont; Anne-Marie O'Connor; Caroline Moran
- Directed by: Ian Fitzgibbon
- Starring: Leah Brotherhead; Sinead Matthews; Taj Atwal; Perry Fitzpatrick; Natalie Davies; Matilda Firth; Yanick Ghanty; Shobna Gulati; Jaylan Batten; Oliver Turner; Felicity Montagu; Pippa Fulton
- Composers: Guy Garvey; Peter Alexander Jobson
- Country of origin: United Kingdom
- Original language: English
- No. of seasons: 2
- No. of episodes: 12

Production
- Executive producers: Hannah Farrell; Faye Ward
- Producer: Lisa Mitchell
- Cinematography: Ross Marshall
- Editor: Pete Drinkwater
- Production companies: Fable Pictures; Sony Pictures Television; Dori Media International; Yoav Gross Productions

Original release
- Network: Channel 4
- Release: 12 April 2022 – 23 November 2023

Hullraisers is a British television sitcom written by Lucy Beaumont, Anne-Marie O'Connor and Caroline Moran. It is about three women who live in Kingston upon Hull, England.

== Production ==
Beaumont wrote the pilot after being approached by Fable to create an adaptation of the Israeli show, Little Mom. O'Connor and Moran came on board when the series was commissioned for Channel 4. Hullraisers premiered in the US on IFC on 5 April 2023. In 2024, Hullraisers was cancelled after two series.

== Synopsis ==
Hullraisers is set in Kingston upon Hull in the East Riding of Yorkshire. It follows the lives of struggling actress and mother Toni, her older sister Paula, along with Paula's sister-in-law, police officer Rana, a sexually confident woman who is the only member of the group who is unmarried and does not have children. Beaumont felt that it was important to set the show in Hull, due to the city's lack of representation in UK media.

Beaumont said of the show, "I'm really proud of it because I feel like everyone was on the same page with the class thing. There are a lot of production companies that are very London-centric. We see so few authentic working-class representations, especially in comedy, I've had so little to refer to and that annoyed me."

O'Connor said of the show, "If you go to Bradford or Hull you could watch two women talking from a distance and you’d think they were having a fight. But then you get nearer and you realise they’re just discussing what they’re having for their tea. It’s not a Ken Loach film, it’s not misery tourism. Life’s a laugh, isn’t it? I've had some of the worst jobs in the world, but I’ve had a laugh while I'm doing it because otherwise, what else are you going to do? Just work 12 hours in a factory and be miserable? You make the fun where you are."

Moran said of the show, "I grew up in a council house on benefits and seeing working-class life on TV was very affirming. There were these funny, intelligent, characters who weren't just the butt of the joke, but the people making the jokes. There have been, lately, a lot of middle-class, aspirational shows. Hullraisers has a different take. Lucy doesn't want to send the place up, she wants to celebrate it."

The first series was shown in April and May 2022. A second series was confirmed in August 2022; it began broadcasting in November 2023.

== Cast and characters ==
- Leah Brotherhead as Toni
- Sinead Matthews as Paula
- Taj Atwal as Rana
- Perry Fitzpatrick as Craig
- Natalie Davies as Ashley
- Matilda Firth as Grace
- Yanick Ghanty as Dane
- Shobna Gulati as Nima
- Jaylan Batten as Jake
- Oliver Turner as Luke
- Felicity Montagu as Gloria
- Pippa Fulton as Leanne
- Leon Cole as Waiter (uncredited)

== Episodes ==
=== Series 1 (2022) ===
All episodes were made available on All4 following the first episode's premiere on 12 April 2022.

No.	Title	Directed by	Written by	Channel 4 airdate	UK viewers (millions) (Note: 7-day consolidated, excludes device viewership and viewership prior to linear broadcast.)
1	"Night Out"	Ian Fitzgibbon	Lucy Beaumont, Anne-Marie O'Connor, Caroline Moran	12 April 2022	1.15
Toni finds herself longing for a night out, but whoever she goes to in search for one she discovers isn't available; later, she ends up taking her daughter on a day out to somewhere a tad inappropriate... Meanwhile, Rana finds out that the Hull City player she hooked up with turns out to be far less significant in the team's rankings than she thought, and lures a relative of his instead. Paula deals with her daughter's underhand attempts to see her boyfriend.
2	"Dry-Spell"	Ian Fitzgibbon	Lucy Beaumont, Anne-Marie O'Connor, Caroline Moran	19 April 2022	0.59
Rana's loaded ex-boyfriend turns up in town, and her entire family and friend group are eagerly awaiting what they believe to be a proposal of marriage. Paula gets some lessons in disciplining the children from a shop assistant, but her liberal dispensing of them results in a rather unexpected road-side abandonment. Toni learns scheduling some 'alone time' with Craig is more trouble than it's worth.
3	"Mucky"	Ian Fitzgibbon	Lucy Beaumont, Anne-Marie O'Connor, Caroline Moran	26 April 2022	0.56
Toni is distraught when the supposedly expensive coat of another pupil she's accidentally brought home is stained, and runs ragged trying to get it cleaned while juggling a potential interview and Paula's decision to prolong her stay in a private hospital she's been diverted to. Rana is tasked with babysitting the 11-year old daughter of a bloke she's seeing, which proves troublesome after the girl takes an instant dislike to her.
4	"Party"	Ian Fitzgibbon	Lucy Beaumont, Anne-Marie O'Connor, Caroline Moran	3 May 2022	0.52
Toni reaches the end of her tether when she is informed her daughter, Grace, is now terrified of flamingos – after having made them the theme for her birthday party, and with only half-an-hour to spare to rid the house of all elements of the animal in the decorations, while Craig's mother, Gloria, sticks the knife in by winding her up to the point both explode. Meanwhile, Rana is enlisted at the last-minute as the party's new entertainer, despite being constantly on the verge of throwing up via hangover, and Paula is bemused by Toni's claims about the birthday party their mother threw for her when she was Grace's age.
5	"Breadcakes"	Ian Fitzgibbon	Lucy Beaumont, Anne-Marie O'Connor, Caroline Moran	10 May 2022	0.53
Toni isn't keen on the impression that daughter Grace is giving of her on the playground, so enlists to help in the PTA bake sale by promising a large order of breadcakes... that she doesn't know how to make. Rana embarks on a detox after being embarrassed by the superior fitness of a younger guy at the gym, and Paula's initial anger at the discovery daughter Ashley is taking pole dancing lessons turns into delight when she is encouraged to take part herself and enjoys it.
6	"New You"	Ian Fitzgibbon	Lucy Beaumont, Anne-Marie O'Connor, Caroline Moran	17 May 2022	0.39
After Toni wakes up feeling reinvigorated and at her best for the first time since daughter Grace was born, she pursues a new dynamic in life, destined to restart things she put on hold, culminating in having a big birthday bash for her 32nd. Rana is disheartened to learn a fit mechanic has sworn off sex in favour of meditation, and shocks herself when he convinces her to try it out and it works. Paula finds her relationship with daughter Ashley at its strongest in some time... before the discovery of a scan result in a purse of Rana's focuses all three women's minds.

=== Series 2 (2023) ===
All episodes were made available two weeks prior to the series' premiere on Channel 4 Stream, exclusively to users subscribed to Channel 4+, a paid-for tier of the service.

No.	Title	Directed by	Written by	Channel 4 airdate	UK viewers (millions) (Note: 7-day consolidated, excludes device viewership and viewership prior to linear broadcast.)
1	"East Riding Romeo"	Ian Fitzgibbon	Lucy Beaumont, Caroline Moran	9 November 2023	N/A
2	"The Paulster"	Ian Fitzgibbon	Lucy Beaumont, Caroline Moran	9 November 2023	N/A
3	"Flirt Master"	Ian Fitzgibbon	Lucy Beaumont, Caroline Moran	16 November 2023	N/A
4	"The Godmother"	Ian Fitzgibbon	Lucy Beaumont, Caroline Moran	16 November 2023	N/A
5	"Event of the Season"	Ian Fitzgibbon	Lucy Beaumont, Caroline Moran	23 November 2023	N/A
6	"Toni and Craig Forever"	Ian Fitzgibbon	Lucy Beaumont, Caroline Moran	23 November 2023	N/A
