= Shazam! (soundtrack) =

Shazam!: Original Motion Picture Soundtrack

Soundtrack album by Benjamin Wallfisch
- Released: April 5, 2019
- Recorded: 2019
- Studio: AIR Lyndhurst (London)
- Genre: Soundtrack
- Length: 73:13
- Label: WaterTower
- Producer: Benjamin Wallfisch

Benjamin Wallfisch chronology
| Serenity (2019) | Shazam!: Original Motion Picture Soundtrack (2019) | Hellboy (2019) |

Shazam!: Original Motion Picture Soundtrack is the soundtrack to the film of the same name composed by Benjamin Wallfisch. It was released on April 5, 2019 by WaterTower Music with the physical edition being released later on May 10.

== Background ==
Benjamin Wallfisch was the composer for Shazam. The film marks the third collaboration between Wallfisch and director David F. Sandberg having scored his debut film Lights Out and Annabelle: Creation. For the score of Shazam, Sandberg and Wallfisch leaned into the territory of old-school fun adventure movies, taking inspiration from the scores of the 1970s and 1980s, specifically that of Superman by John Williams and Back to the Future by Alan Silvestri. Sandberg noted "that many modern scores have moved away from such traditional music" and as such made the score a fitting homage to the Golden Age of Hollywood.

Wallfisch noted that the film's story had that "kind of tenderness at the heart of the story" and a sense of "optimism for the future". From there, he crafted several themes – Sivana's theme, the Wizard theme, the music for the Seven Deadly Sins, the family theme and Shazam's themes which comprises a Hero theme and a Transformation theme and worked around creating a melodic soundscape, balancing between the comedy and adventure aspects. For the film's villain, Dr. Sivana, Wallfisch opted for a minimalist approach utilising only low male choir, extended bass woodwinds and brass.

The score was recorded at AIR Lyndhurst Studios in Hampstead, London with a 140-piece Chamber Orchestra of London and was conducted by Wallfisch and Chris Egan.

== Track listing ==
All music is composed by Benjamin Wallfisch.

| No. | Title | Length |
|---|---|---|
| 1. | "Shazam!" | 3:59 |
| 2. | "The Consul of Wizards" | 3:01 |
| 3. | "Seeking Spell" | 2:33 |
| 4. | "Compass" | 3:26 |
| 5. | "Seven Symbols" | 4:17 |
| 6. | "The Rock of Eternity" | 4:17 |
| 7. | "Subway Chase" | 0:45 |
| 8. | "It's You or No One" | 4:59 |
| 9. | "Dude, You're Stacked" | 1:18 |
| 10. | "This Is Power" | 2:32 |
| 11. | "Bus Rescue" | 2:29 |
| 12. | "You're Like a Bad Guy, Right?" | 1:16 |
| 13. | "Them's Street Rules" | 0:48 |
| 14. | "Superman It" | 0:55 |
| 15. | "Super Villain" | 1:39 |
| 16. | "You Might Need It More Than Me" | 5:38 |
| 17. | "Come Home Billy" | 3:02 |
| 18. | "Give Me Your Power" | 1:41 |
| 19. | "His Name Is (Includes elements of "Beautiful Lie")" | 2:46 |
| 20. | "Sentimental Nonsense" | 1:54 |
| 21. | "Run!" | 2:13 |
| 22. | "Play Time's Over" | 1:48 |
| 23. | "All Hands on Deck" | 2:05 |
| 24. | "I Can Fly!" | 2:14 |
| 25. | "Fight Flight" | 3:31 |
| 26. | "Finale" | 4:11 |
| 27. | "We've Got a Lair" | 1:31 |
| 28. | "I'm Home" | 0:53 |
| 29. | "I Name the Gods" | 1:32 |
| Total length: | | 73:13 |

== Additional music ==
In addition to Wallfisch's score, the other songs that are featured in the film, includes "Do You Hear What I Hear" by Bing Crosby, "The Real Thing" by Cook Classics & Outasight, "Feels" by Calvin Harris (feat. Pharrell Williams, Katy Perry & Big Sean), "Legend" by Twenty One Pilots, "Feel Me Flow" by Naughty by Nature, "Don't Stop Me Now" by the Queen, "Eye of the Tiger" by Survivor, "Cherry Pie" by Warrant, "Slow Hands" by Niall Horan and "I Don't Want To Grow Up" by the Ramones (Tom Waits cover), with the latter playing during the end credits. A rendition of John Williams' Superman theme is played during Superman's appearance at the end of the film.
