= Matilda Firth =

British actress

- Born: 1 December 2014 (age 11); West Yorkshire, England
- Occupation: Actress
- Years active: 2022–present

Matilda Firth (born 1 December 2014) is an English actress. She is best known for her roles in Subservience, Disney's Disenchanted, and Hullraisers. She also stars as Ginger in Blumhouse's Wolf Man (2025).

== Early life ==
Matilda Firth was born in West Yorkshire. She is the middle of three siblings. Her elder brother Sam played Young Charlie in Season 2 of Heartstopper and her younger brother Tom played Cameron Castleton, Matilda's onscreen brother, in Mr Bates vs The Post Office.

== Career ==
Firth began acting from a young age, landing her first professional role at the age of five as a minor character in Amazon Studios The Feed. She spent the next couple of years making brief appearances in programs such as The English Game and The Irregulars.

Firth made a big impression in 2021, where she tugged at heartstrings in the McDonald's Christmas Advert that year, directed by Bert & Bertie.

She portrayed the character of Grace in Channel 4 Sitcom Hullraisers in 2022 and 2023.

Her next role was as Young Mia, in Peacock's Vampire Academy, based on the hit book series of the same name by Richelle Mead.

Firth's debut feature film appearance was in Disney's Disenchanted, where she appeared as a Bella, a young girl rescued by Patrick Dempsey’s character.

In 2025, Firth starred in Blumhouse's Wolf Man. Jason Blum and Ryan Gosling executive produced, and the film is directed by Leigh Whannell. Firth plays Ginger, the daughter of Blake (Christoper Abbott) and Charlotte (Julia Garner).

Firth's other film credits includes the role of Young Carole in Christmas Carole for Sky Movies, the youngest Burnsall sister in Starve Acre alongside Matt Smith, and Isla in Subservience.

Firth's TV credits include roles in series' such as the BBC's Time, Coma for Channel 5 and Mr Bates vs The Post Office, the hit drama for ITV.

Firth has been announced to be appearing in the upcoming Marvel Cinematic Universe (MCU) film Avengers: Doomsday (2026), playing an undisclosed role known. The information of her role was previously listed as 'Little Girl' before it was removed by her agency.

== Filmography ==
=== Television ===
Year	Title	Role	Notes
2022	Vampire Academy	Younger Mia	1 episode
2022–2023	Hullraisers	Grace	11 episodes
2023	The Power	Little Girl (uncredited)	1 episode
2023	Time	Nancy O'Riordan	3 episodes
2024	Mr Bates vs. The Post Office	Millie-Jo Castleton	1 episode
2024	Coma	Sophie	4 episodes
2025	Nine Perfect Strangers	Young Tina	2 episodes

=== Film ===
Year	Title	Role	Notes
2022	Disenchanted	Little Girl (Giant)	
2022	Typist Artist Pirate King	Magic Girl	
2022	Christmas Carole	Young Carole	TV Movie
2023	Starve Acre	Younger Burnsall Sister	
2024	Subservience	Isla	
2025	Wolf Man	Ginger Lovell	
2025	Tinsel Town	Emma	
2026	Avengers: Doomsday	Little Girl	Post-production
