= It (soundtrack) =

It: Original Motion Picture Soundtrack

Film score by Benjamin Wallfisch
- Released: September 1, 2017
- Recorded: 2017
- Studio: Eastwood Scoring Stage
- Genre: Film score
- Length: 1:27:00
- Label: WaterTower Music
- Producer: Benjamin Wallfisch

Benjamin Wallfisch chronology
Annabelle: Creation (2017)	It: Original Motion Picture Soundtrack (2017)	Blade Runner 2049: Original Motion Picture Soundtrack (2017)

It: Original Motion Picture Soundtrack is the soundtrack album to the 2017 American film It. An adaptation of the 1986 novel of the same name by Stephen King, the first of the two-cinematic parts (Note: The film, titled onscreen as It: Chapter One, covers primarily the first half of the book.) is directed by Andy Muschietti, and featured musical score composed by Benjamin Wallfisch. Wallfisch had been influenced by several works from film composers, notably John Williams and Alan Silvestri's works, while creating the score for It, and uses orchestral music to reflect the period of 1980s setting. A preview of the song list was released by WaterTower Music on August 25, 2017 and the soundtrack album consisting 38 tracks, were digitally released on September 1. A limited edition double LP was released on October 27, that consisted of a 18 tracks in the original score and remaining 29 tracks, that was released separately. The score received positive response from critics, appreaciting Wallfisch for the orchestral approach for the soundtrack.

== Development ==
On March 23, 2017, the film's director Andy Muschietti announced that Benjamin Wallfisch would compose the film's musical score. Wallfisch, stated that he was hugely admired of Stephen King's works since childhood and the production team sent several promos to him regarding the approach for the film score. Wallfisch stated that Jerry Goldsmith, John Williams, Alan Silvestri and Dave Grusin's compositions for film such as Poltergeist (1982), E.T. the Extra-Terrestrial, Back to the Future (1985) and The Goonies were largely influential in the score of It, as he felt so passionate about those "big thematic style of scoring", albeit at the same time wishing to go beyond the idea that it would be a purely orchestral and adventurous score in the 1980s.

"The concept really was to both pay homage to that very bold, symphonic, thematic, orchestral scoring of the classic '80s adventure scores, but also reinvent it. Because the movie is really a visionary sort of re-imagining of what everyone's concepts of putting the story on screen is. It takes the book as its absolutely number one vantage point, as opposed to the miniseries. We're not updating the miniseries, it's all about just being true to the book."

— Benjamin Wallfisch, about It's score

Wallfisch had written most of the tracks after watching the final edit of the film's footage. He believed that "there much more to this movie than just the horror moments" and his primary job is to "make sure the story of this group of kids coming together to defeat something so malevolent was at the forefront of the score, with the moments of horror feeding into that overall approach". When, asked about the film's similarities with Stranger Things, where the composers duo Kyle Dixon and Michael Stein produced synth-heavy music with 80's influence, Wallfisch denied that they did not use synth score, but used orchestral music to provide homage to the 80s.

According to Wallfisch, he had to develop a theme for Pennywise which included finding and creating music that could infect all the other melodies as there are several themes in the film but the Pennywise score is a very quiet and whispered childlike tune using very high strings. Wallfisch spoke of Pennywise's second theme, inspired by Skarsgård's portrayal, in which he used the old children's song "Oranges and Lemons", which had always disturbed him as a child: "We knew we wanted some kind of children's song to signify Pennywise's strange and demented inner monologue. I also very subtly use certain melodic fragments from it in other themes, for example the piano music that opens and closes the movie." Pennywise's first theme was inspired from a melody that composed during mid-1600.

Wallfisch returned to score for the second part of the film, and most of the tracks were written by early-2019. For the sequel, he demanded a larger orchestra and choir as the score draws on both themes from the first film's soundtrack with "more scale and ambition" and new themes were created to reflect the scope of the film and character development after 27 years, since its predecessor.

== Track listing ==
All tracks are written by Benjamin Wallfisch.

It: Original Motion Picture Soundtrack
No.	Title	Length
1.	"Every 27 Years"	2:36
2.	"Paper Boat"	1:55
3.	"Georgie, Meet Pennywise"	3:38
4.	"Derry"	2:25
5.	"River Chase"	2:09
6.	"Egg Boy"	2:44
7.	"Beverly"	1:20
8.	"Come Join the Clowns, Eds"	1:20
9.	"You'll Float Too"	3:20
10.	"Shape Shifter"	1:42
11.	"Hockstetter Attack"	2:15
12.	"Haircut"	4:15
13.	"Derry History"	2:48
14.	"January Embers"	1:05
15.	"Saving Mike"	1:15
16.	"This Is Not a Dream"	2:08
17.	"Slideshow"	2:00
18.	"Georgie's Theme"	1:42
19.	"He Didn't Stutter Once"	1:33
20.	"29 Neibolt St."	4:17
21.	"Time to Float"	3:04
22.	"It's What It Wants"	1:19
23.	"You'll Die If You Try"	4:38
24.	"Return to Neibolt"	2:31
25.	"Into the Well"	2:05
26.	"Pennywise's Tower"	1:48
27.	"Deadlights"	2:04
28.	"Searching for Stanley"	2:28
29.	"Saving Beverly"	3:36
30.	"Georgie Found"	1:53
31.	"Transformation"	0:58
32.	"Feed on Your Fear"	2:34
33.	"Welcome to the Losers Club"	3:05
34.	"Yellow Raincoat"	1:43
35.	"Blood Oath"	3:11
36.	"Kiss"	0:54
37.	"Every 27 Years (Reprise)"	2:07
38.	"Epilogue – The Pennywise Dance"	0:36
Total length:		1:27:00

== Reviews ==
Writing for Junkee Media, Cameron Williams stated: "The soundtrack for It is light on hits but it runs deep with the story. Each song carries weight with each scene [...] The music highlights the control the film has over the '80s: It never lets the setting define the film, which stops it from getting tangled in sentimentality. And therein lies its understated genius." Paul Taylor of Lemon Wire said "the soundtrack to "IT: Chapter One” has everything you could ask for in a horror movie. It's the perfect accompaniment to all the jump scares, the building sense of dread, and the climactic final fight. More than that, Benjamin Wallfisch's score manages to fit in all the little human elements too, making it easier for us to connect with the characters. It's one of those really great soundtracks that might otherwise go overlooked by some, but don't sleep on it." Critic Bernhard H. Heidkamp of Behind the Audio called it, "One of the best scores of the year". Wallfisch was nominated for the Composer of the Year award, by the International Film Music Critics Association for his work in the film.

== Chart performance ==
Chart (2019)	Peak position
UK Soundtrack Albums (OCC)	28
US Soundtrack Albums (Billboard)	40

== Release history ==
Region	Date	Format(s)	Catalog Code(s)	Ref.
Worldwide	September 1, 2017	Digital download; streaming	—N/a	
Europe	September 27, 2017	CD	WTM39949	
Japan	November 3, 2017	CD	RBCP-3226	
US	September 25, 2017	CD	WTM39926	
US	October 27, 2017	Vinyl	WTM39927	
US	October 27, 2017	Vinyl	WTM39952-ST01	
US	November 17, 2017	LP (Note: Released as IT: Music from the Motion Picture)	WTM39948-ST01	
UK	November 17, 2017	LP	WTM39950-ST01	
