= The Flash (soundtrack) =

The Flash (Original Motion Picture Soundtrack)

Film score by Benjamin Wallfisch
- Released: June 16, 2023
- Recorded: August–September 2022
- Studios: Abbey Road Studios, London
- Genre: Film score
- Length: 83:31
- Label: WaterTower
- Producer: Benjamin Wallfisch

Benjamin Wallfisch chronology
Thirteen Lives (2022)	The Flash (2023)	Twisters (Original Motion Picture Score) (2024)

Singles from The Flash (Original Motion Picture Soundtrack)
- 1. "Worlds Collide" Released: May 12, 2023; 2. "Run" Released: May 12, 2023; 3. "I Am Batman" Released: May 31, 2023; 4. "Sounds About Right, Bruce" Released: May 31, 2023

The Flash (Original Motion Picture Soundtrack) is the soundtrack to the 2023 film The Flash directed by Andy Muschietti. Based on the DC Comics character of the same name, the film is the 13th installment in the DC Extended Universe (DCEU). Featuring an original score composed, produced and conducted by Benjamin Wallfisch, who worked with Muschietti on It (2017) and It Chapter Two (2019) and also scored DC's Shazam.

The album was released by WaterTower Music on June 16, 2023, and was led by four singles—"World's Collide", "Run", "I Am Batman" and "Sounds About Right, Bruce"—released on May 12 and 31.

== Production and release ==
Muschietti met with his norm composer Wallfisch on the summer of 2020, to score for The Flash, although he was officially confirmed on the project in April 2021. While developing the script, he was impressed with the concepts they discussed agreeing to be a part of the film. Wallfisch began scoring for the film on August 26, 2022, at the Abbey Road Studios in London, and completed by that September. In March 2023, Muschietti took to Instagram sharing a video clip from Wallfisch's score, for Michael Keaton who reprised his role as Bruce Wayne / Batman from Tim Burton's Batman film series. He reused Danny Elfman's Batman theme from the original series, which was considered as one of the easter eggs in the film.

The first piece he wrote for the film was "Run", which he described as a "restless, searching piano figure, representing Barry’s crisis after losing his mother". The music was played against insistent staccato strings that are "on the edge of being impossible to perform because of their sheer speed". He played the rough sketch of the theme to Muschietti along with other musical ideas developed for the film. Two years later, while Muschietti was editing for his first cut, he surprised Wallfisch by including the piano sketch against one of the key sequences, that made to the final edit, which Wallfisch had praised.

The track would be released as a single from the album on May 12, 2023, along with another track "World's Collide" which included Elfman's Batman theme, played for Keaton's character in the climatic sequence. He and Muschietti iterated over 50 times, to get the right theme, even though the orchestra was recording.

On May 31, 2023, Wallfisch unveiled two Batman themes for Keaton and Ben Affleck's Batman from the DC Extended Universe—"I Am Batman" and "Sounds About Right, Bruce". The soundtrack to the film, featuring 40 themes from Wallfisch's score was released by WaterTower Music on the same date as the film, June 16, 2023.

== Track listing ==
No.	Title	Length
1.	"Are You Actively Eating That Candy Bar?"	0:58
2.	"Sounds About Right, Bruce"	4:16
3.	"Collapsing East Wing"	2:49
4.	"Baby Shower"	2:08
5.	"Nora"	3:22
6.	"Run"	1:44
7.	"Not This Time, Kid"	1:11
8.	"Can of Tomatoes"	1:54
9.	"See You Soon"	1:14
10.	"Please Work"	1:28
11.	"Today's the Day"	1:44
12.	"Phasing"	1:31
13.	"Escape from the Lab"	2:01
14.	"Zod"	1:15
15.	"What Is This Place?^{[a]}"	1:20
16.	"Spaghetti"	1:24
17.	"Into the Batcave^{[a]}"	2:14
18.	"I Loved You First"	1:35
19.	"Fate^{[a]}"	1:03
20.	"I Am Batman^{[a]}"	2:06
21.	"Batdoneon^{[a]}"	0:56
22.	"Kal-El?^{[a]}"	1:24
23.	"Escape from Siberia^{[a]}"	2:18
24.	"Now We Try Not to Die"	1:17
25.	"Supergirl"	2:45
26.	"Want Some Help?"	1:56
27.	"I Gave You a Warning"	1:26
28.	"What Could Go Wrong?^{[a]}"	1:25
29.	"Let's Get Electrocuted"	1:30
30.	"I've Got You"	2:15
31.	"You Wanna Get Nuts?"	1:56
32.	"Let's Get Nuts"	3:30
33.	"Cyclonic Diversion"	2:30
34.	"I'm Not Going Alone^{[a]}"	2:32
35.	"We Can Fix This^{[a]}"	1:55
36.	"Inevitable Intersection"	1:08
37.	"We Can Save Her"	2:17
38.	"The Dark Flash"	2:09
39.	"Worlds Collide (Superman Version)^{[b]}"	2:32
40.	"You're My Hero"	1:43
41.	"Into the Singularity"	1:00
42.	"Call Me"	3:21
43.	"Worlds Collide"	2:29
Total length:		83:31

== Additional music ==
The Flash featured the following songs that are played in the film, which includes: "If You Leave Me Now" by Chicago, "Bad Fun" by The Cult, "Pedro Navaja" by Natalie Fernandez, "Piensa en mí" by Natalia LaFourcade, Vincenzo Bellini's "I puritani" performed by Compagnia d’Opera Italiana, Linda Campanella and Antonello Gotta, "Alright" by Supergrass, "25 or 6 to 4" by Chicago, "Salute Your Solution" by The Raconteurs, "Si Tú Supieras Compañero" by Rosalía and "This Too Shall Pass" by OK Go. Hans Zimmer's and Junkie XL's Wonder Woman theme from Batman v Superman: Dawn of Justice (2016) and John Williams' Superman theme from Superman (1978) is also heard in the film.

== Reception ==
Johnny Oleksinski of New York Post wrote "Chills come as composer Danny Elfman’s memorably seedy caped crusader theme from the 1980s and ’90s is sweepingly woven into Benjamin Wallfisch’s new score." Jack Pooley of WhatCulture summarised that Wallfisch's score "clearly indebted to Alan Silvestri's brassy Back to the Future score" and he "melds this orchestral pomp with pulsing electronic elements to thrilling effect", which complimented "the visuals consistently well throughout". Kristofer Purnell of The Philippine Star "Benjamin Wallfisch has done admirable compositions for horror and drama films in recent years, but nothing can beat the tingling sensation of hearing Danny Elfman's "Batman" musical cues again as well as other superhero themes which will follow suit as iconic one day."

== Notes ==
- ^{^a} Contain interpolation of "The Batman Theme" written by Danny Elfman
- ^{^b} Contains interpolation of "Theme From Superman (Main Title)" written by John Williams
