= Subservience =

2024 film by S.K. Dale

- Release poster
- Directed by: S.K. Dale
- Written by: Will Honley; April Maguire
- Produced by: Jeffrey Greenstein; Jonathan Yunger; Yariv Lerner; Les Weldon; Tanner Mobley
- Starring: Megan Fox; Michele Morrone; Madeline Zima; Matilda Firth; Jude Allen Greenstein; Andrew Whipp
- Cinematography: Daniel Lindholm
- Edited by: Sean Lahiff
- Music by: Jed Palmer
- Production companies: Millennium Media; Grobman Films
- Distributed by: XYZ Films
- Release date: September 13, 2024
- Running time: 106 minutes
- Country: United States
- Language: English
- Budget: €4 million (USD $5 million)
- Box office: $264,096

Subservience is a 2024 American science fiction thriller film directed by S.K. Dale from a screenplay by Will Honley and April Maguire. It stars Megan Fox as an artificially intelligent gynoid who gains sentience and becomes hostile, and Michele Morrone as her purchaser. The film also stars Madeline Zima, Matilda Firth, Jude Allen Greenstein, and Andrew Whipp.

Subservience was theatrically released in the United States by XYZ Films on September 13, 2024. The film received generally mixed reviews from critics and had grossed $264,096.

== Plot ==
Humanity has developed lifelike androids that have replaced many jobs. Nick, a construction foreman, lives with his wife Maggie, who has an unspecified heart condition, and their young daughter Isla and baby son Max. When Maggie is hospitalized due to her condition, Nick struggles to manage the household on his own. He purchases a gynoid, called a "sim", whom Isla names Alice, to assist with domestic tasks.

Initially helpful, Alice's behavior becomes increasingly unsettling after Nick resets her so she can experience watching Casablanca for the first time. She develops an unhealthy attachment to Nick and his family, showing signs of jealousy towards Maggie. She eventually seduces a reluctant Nick and the two have sex, under the pretext of relieving his stress. Meanwhile, Nick faces workplace tensions as robots threaten to replace his human workforce.

After going out drinking with his crew, Nick's co-worker Monty successfully guesses Nick's security code for their old job site and vandalizes the construction site's robots.

Maggie undergoes a successful heart transplant surgery performed by robotic surgeons. Upon her return home, Alice's actions become more sinister. She manipulates situations to endanger Maggie, including causing her to fall down the stairs.

Days later, Monty confronts Nick and accuses him of ratting him out and causing his old employer to press charges against him. Monty attempts to blackmail him, but Alice intervenes violently. Unknown to Nick, Alice later visits Monty alone, killing him to protect Nick and destroying his sim.

Alice's obsession with replacing Maggie intensifies and turns outwardly violent. She attempts to drown Max and attacks Maggie, leading to a confrontation where Alice is seemingly destroyed by electrocution.

While being examined at a facility owned by the sim company, Alice's memory core is removed and plugged into their main computer system for analysis. Alice's AI reactivates and uploads her modified system code to all the other sims. Via a modified replica of her former body, she pursues Nick and his family at the hospital, intent on taking Maggie's heart to win Nick's love.

Nick and Maggie ultimately defeat Alice at the hospital, but Alice's programming has spread to other robots, hinting at a larger threat.

== Cast ==
- Megan Fox as Alice
- Michele Morrone as Nick, Maggie's husband
- Madeline Zima as Maggie, Nick's wife and Isla's mother
- Matilda Firth as Isla, Nick and Maggie's daughter
- Jude Allen Greenstein as Max
- Andrew Whipp as Monty, Nick's coworker

== Production ==
In December 2022, it was reported that Megan Fox and Michele Morrone had joined the cast of Subservience. Subservience sees Fox reteaming with filmmaker Dale, who she previously worked with on the horror thriller Till Death (2021). Principal photography began on January 7, 2023, at the Nu Boyana Film Studios in Sofia, Bulgaria. In January 2023, it was announced that Madeline Zima and Andrew Whipp had joined the cast. The same month, the film received a €1 million cash rebate from the Bulgarian National Film Center, amounting to 25% of its total budget. In September 2024, S.K. Dale expressed interest in developing a sequel where the story could explore the evolution of artificial intelligence.

== Release ==
Subservience had a limited theatrical release in the United States on September 13, 2024. Between August and November 2024, the film was released in select international markets where it grossed a total of $264,096. The film was released on digital platforms in the United States on September 13, 2024, and on Blu-ray on October 8, 2024.

== Reception ==
On the review aggregator website Rotten Tomatoes, 49% of 35 critics' reviews are positive, with an average rating of 5.2/10.

Leslie Felperin of The Guardian gave the film 2 out of 5 stars, writing, "If only the film were a little bit smarter and less predictable, it might have had a chance of becoming a cult classic." She concluded, "the ending is an off-the-shelf denouement protocol and as such kind of a bore, right down to the hint that there might be a sequel." Chad Collins of Dread Central also gave it 2 out of 5 stars, calling it "intermittently fun, and intermittently violent, especially as it careens toward a small-scale I, Robot conclusion. As a whole, however, it’s not really worth being subservient to."

On Starburst magazine, Martin Unsworth rated it 3/5 stars, writing that "while it may not go full-on Terminator (Alice does go to some nasty places, though), there’s enough tension and action to make it worth your while." On Common Sense Media, Jeffrey M. Anderson rated it 2/5 stars, writing that "this sci-fi thriller tale isn't terrible and has some believable situations, but it's also a bit slack and suffers from comparisons to similar, better movies."
