= Andrew Whipp =

British actor

- Occupation: Actor

Andrew Whipp is a British actor. He is best known for his roles in Not Going Out as Dr Jenkins and Emmerdale as Callum Rennie and Eastenders as DI Savage. Whipp has received critical acclaim for many of his stage performances; most recently playing Gordon in F*ck the Polar Bears at the Bush Theatre. He was named in the Best Performances of 2010 list in the Sunday Times Irish Edition for his performance as Bernard Nightingale in Arcadia by Tom Stoppard at the Gate Theatre, Dublin, directed by Patrick Mason. His performance was described by The Irish Times critic Peter Crawley: "Whipp does a marvellous job of being likeably contemptible".

== Television ==
Year	Series	Episode	Role	Director	Producer
2020	The Mallorca Files	Episode 2.1	Oliver Barker	Craig Pickles	BBC
2020	Father Brown	Episode 8.7	Roger Barnford	Jennie Paddon	BBC
2020	Cursed	Episodes 2,5,6	Jonah	Zetna Fuentes, Daniel Nettheim	Netflix
2017	The White Princess (miniseries)	Episodes 4-8	Richard Pole	Jamie Payne	Starz
2016	Death in Paradise	Episode No. 5.6	Gary Holt	Roger Simonsz	BBC
2016	The Coroner	First Love	Philip Bailey	Ian Barber	BBC
2015	Spotless	One Hand Clapping, Carrot & Stick	Gareth	Pascal Chaumeil	Canal+
2015	Suspicion	Death Next Door	Ray	Tom Keeling	October Films
2015	Outlander (TV series)	Lallybroch	Brian Fraser	Mike Barker	Starz
2015	Outlander (TV series)	The Garrison Commander	Brian Fraser	Brian Kelly	Starz
2015	A Song for Jenny	TV film	DCI	Brian Percival	BBC
2014	Critical		Curtis Taylor	Jon East	Hat Trick Productions
2012	Not Going Out	Examination	Dr. Jenkins	Nick Wood	BBC
2012	Holby City	Equilibrium	Andrew Zimmerman	Reza Moradi	BBC
2011	EastEnders	Ep. 27 December 2011	D.I. Savage	Michael Owen Morris	BBC
2009	Heartbeat (British TV series)	Cashing In	Jim Bly	Gerry Mill	Yorkshire Television
2007	Doctors (2000 TV series)	Red, White & Blue	Bill Hampshire	David O'Neil	BBC
2005	Love Lies Bleeding	TV film	Graham Brining	David Drury	Granada Television
2006	City Lights	Episode No. 1.6	Policeman	Martin Dennis	Granada Television
2004	Emmerdale	Regular Character	Callum Rennie	Various	Yorkshire Television
2004	Judge John Deed	Regular Character	Henry Kuhle	Various	Granada Television
2004	Real Crime with Mark Austin	Love You To Death	Detective Sergeant Stephen Beech	Paula Lichtarowicz	ITV
2003	Absolute Power (comedy)	History Man	Marcus Payne	John Morton	BBC
2002	Falling Apart	TV film	Paul	Brian Hill (director)	Century Films
1999	CI5: The New Professionals	Hostage	TV Director	John Davies	Sky1

== Film ==
Year	Film	Role	Director	Producer
2018	Viking Destiny	King Asmund of Volsung	David L.G. Hughes	Fatal Black
2017	Treasures from the Wreck of the Unbelievable. Damien Hirst	Andrew Lerner	Sam Hobkinson	Oxford Film/Science
2015	Silent Hours	DS Pinker	Mark Greenstreet	Gallery Pictures
2014	Artificio Conceal	Marcus Green	Ayoub Qanir	Transient Films
2009	The Fourth Kind	Archive Tommy Fisher	Olatunde Osunsanmi	Universal Pictures
2006	Amazing Grace (2006 film)	MP 1	Michael Apted	Walden Media
2023	Subservience		S.K. Dale	Jeff Greenstein

== Stage ==
Year	Play	Role	Director	Producer
2025	Stranger Things: The First Shadow	Chief Hopper	Stephen Daldry	Phoenix Theatre, London
2015	F*ck the Polar Bears	Gordon	Caroline Byrne	Bush Theatre
2015	Now This is Not the End	Paul	Katie Lewis	Arcola Theatre
2013	Farragut North (play)	Tom Duffy	Guy Unsworth	Southwark Playhouse
2013	The Dark at the Top of the Stairs	Rubin Flood	Lisa Forrell	Belgrade Theatre
2011	Macbeth		Bill Buckhurst	Shakespeare's Globe
2010	Celebration (play)	Russell	Wayne Jordan	Gate Theatre, Dublin
2010	Arcadia (play)	Bernard	Patrick Mason	Gate Theatre, Dublin
2007	Much Ado About Nothing	Don Pedro	Bill Buckhurst	Stafford
2003	The Misanthrope	Philinte	Colin Blumenau	Theatre Royal, Bury St Edmunds
2001	King Lear		Barry Kyle	Shakespeare's Globe
2000	Les Liaisons Dangereuses (Hampton play)	Azolan/Valmont	Peter Wilson	PW Productions
2000	Stand Up	Tony	Roy Marsden	Palace Theatre, Westcliff-on-Sea & Pleasance Theatre
