= Hollywood Music in Media Award for Best Original Score in a Horror Film =

Film score award

Hollywood Music in Media for Best Original Score in a Horror Film
- Country: United States
- Presented by: Hollywood Music in Media Awards (HMMA)
- First award: 2014
- Currently held by: Rock Burwell; Obsession (2026)
- Website: www.hmmawards.com

The Hollywood Music in Media Award for Best Original Score in a Horror Film is one of the awards given annually to people working in the motion picture industry by the Hollywood Music in Media Awards (HMMA). It is presented to the composers who have composed the best "original" score, written specifically for a sci-fi/fantasy motion picture. It was grouped with "sci-fi/fantasy" films, until it was given its own category in 2020. The award was first given in 2014, during the fifth annual awards.

== Winners and nominees ==
=== 2010s ===
Hollywood Music in Media Award for Best Original Score in a Sci-Fi/Fantasy Film

Year	Film	Nominees
(2014); 5th
(2014); 5th	The Hobbit: The Desolation of Smaug	Howard Shore
(2014); 5th	Dawn of the Planet of the Apes	Michael Giacchino
(2014); 5th	Guardians of the Galaxy	Tyler Bates
(2014); 5th	Maleficent	James Newton Howard
(2014); 5th	Noah	Clint Mansell
(2014); 5th	Transformers: Age of Extinction	Steve Jablonsky
(2015); 6th
(2015); 6th	Mad Max: Fury Road	Junkie XL
(2015); 6th	Ant-Man	Christophe Beck
(2015); 6th	Avengers: Age of Ultron	Danny Elfman and Brian Tyler
(2015); 6th	Cinderella	Patrick Doyle
(2015); 6th	The Martian	Harry Gregson-Williams
(2015); 6th	Tomorrowland	Michael Giacchino
(2016); 7th
(2016); 7th	The Jungle Book	John Debney
(2016); 7th	Arrival	Jóhann Jóhannsson
(2016); 7th	Doctor Strange	Michael Giacchino
(2016); 7th	Midnight Special	David Wingo
(2016); 7th	10 Cloverfield Lane	Bear McCreary
(2016); 7th	X-Men: Apocalypse	John Ottman

Hollywood Music in Media Award for Best Original Score in a Sci-Fi/Fantasy/Horror Film

Year	Film	Nominees
(2017); 8th
(2017); 8th	The Shape of Water	Alexandre Desplat
(2017); 8th	Blade Runner 2049	Benjamin Wallfisch & Hans Zimmer
(2017); 8th	Get Out	Michael Abels
(2017); 8th	Logan	Marco Beltrami
(2017); 8th	Thor: Ragnarok	Mark Mothersbaugh
(2017); 8th	Wonder Woman	Rupert Gregson-Williams
(2018); 9th
(2018); 9th	Black Panther	Ludwig Göransson
(2018); 9th	Ant-Man and the Wasp	Christophe Beck
(2018); 9th	Deadpool 2	Tyler Bates
(2018); 9th	Mary Poppins Returns	Marc Shaiman
(2018); 9th	A Quiet Place	Marco Beltrami
(2018); 9th	Ready Player One	Alan Silvestri

Hollywood Music in Media Award for Best Original Score in a Horror Film

Year	Film	Nominees
(2019); 10th
(2019); 10th	Us	Michael Abels
(2019); 10th	The Curse of La Llorona	Joseph Bishara
(2019); 10th	The Dead Don't Die	SQÜRL
(2019); 10th	It Chapter Two	Benjamin Wallfisch
(2019); 10th	Zombieland: Double Tap	Dave Sardy

=== 2020s ===
Year	Film	Nominees
(2020); 11th
(2020); 11th	The Invisible Man	Benjamin Wallfisch
(2020); 11th	Antebellum	Nate Wonder, Roman GianArthur
(2020); 11th	The Dark and the Wicked	Tom Schraeder
(2020); 11th	The Empty Man	Christopher Young, Lustmord
(2020); 11th	Swallow	Nathan Halpern
(2021); 12th
(2021); 12th	A Quiet Place Part II	Marco Beltrami
(2021); 12th	Army of the Dead	Tom Holkenborg
(2021); 12th	In the Earth	Clint Mansell
(2021); 12th	Last Night in Soho	Steven Price
(2021); 12th	Old	Trevor Gureckis
(2022); 13th
(2022); 13th	Nope	Michael Abels
(2022); 13th	Barbarian	Anna Drubich
(2022); 13th	Halloween Ends	John Carpenter, Cody Carpenter, Daniel Davies
(2022); 13th	Scream: Legacy	Lance Treviño
(2022); 13th	The Black Phone	Mark Korven
(2022); 13th	The Menu	Colin Stetson
(2023); 14th
(2023); 14th	A Haunting in Venice	Hildur Guðnadóttir
(2023); 14th	Deliver Us	Tóti Guðnason
(2023); 14th	Knock at the Cabin	Herdís Stefánsdóttir
(2023); 14th	M3GAN	Anthony Willis
(2023); 14th	The Boogeyman	Patrick Jonsson
(2023); 14th	The Exorcist: Believer	David Wingo, Amman Abbasi
(2024); 15th
(2024); 15th	Nosferatu	Robin Carolan
(2024); 15th	A Quiet Place: Day One	Alexis Grapsas
(2024); 15th	Here After	Fabrizio Mancinelli
(2024); 15th	Longlegs	Zilgi
(2024); 15th	Speak No Evil	Danny Bensi & Saunder Jurriaans
(2024); 15th	The Substance	Raffertie
(2025); 16th
(2025); 16th	Wolf Man	Benjamin Wallfisch
(2025); 16th	Black Phone 2	Atticus Derrickson
(2025); 16th	Bring Her Back	Cornel Wilczek
(2025); 16th	The Other	Holly Amber Church
(2025); 16th	Heart Eyes	Jay Wadley
(2025); 16th	Dangerous Animals	Michael Yezerski
(2026); 17th
(2026); 17th	Obsession	Rock Burwell
(2026); 17th	Backrooms	Edo Van Breemen and Kane Parsons
(2026); 17th	Clayface	Volker Bertelmann
(2026); 17th	Resident Evil	Hays Holladay
(2026); 17th	Scream 7	Marco Beltrami
(2026); 17th	Send Help	Danny Elfman
