= Hellboy (2019 soundtrack) =

Hellboy (Original Motion Picture Soundtrack)

Film score by Benjamin Wallfisch
- Released: April 5, 2019
- Recorded: 2019
- Studios: AIR Studios, London
- Genre: Film score
- Length: 48:38
- Label: Sony Masterworks
- Producer: Benjamin Wallfisch

Benjamin Wallfisch chronology
Shazam! (2019)	Hellboy (Original Motion Picture Soundtrack) (2019)	It Chapter Two (2019)

Hellboy (Original Motion Picture Soundtrack) is the film score soundtrack to the 2019 film Hellboy, directed by Neil Marshall, based on the Dark Horse Comics character of the same name, created by Mike Mignola. A reboot of the Hellboy film series, it is the third live-action entry in the franchise, starring David Harbour in the titular role. The film score is composed by Benjamin Wallfisch and released through Sony Masterworks on April 5, 2019.

== Background ==
In June 2018, it was reported that Benjamin Wallfisch would compose the score for Hellboy. Wallfisch noted that the film "has this extraordinary kind of punk attitude" and wanted to create a true terrifying sound which was aggressive and heavy. To make it sound from the underworld, he experimented it with EDM synth sounds combined with punk rock guitars and a heavy low-end orchestra which was mixed in a way that sounded similar to a radio mix of an EDM track, he considered it a "strong, powerful and impactful [...] produced sound". The music in Hellboy considered to be the opposite of Wallfisch's score for Shazam!, released during the same time, which combined live orchestral recording. Wallfisch considered the film to be different from Guillermo del Toro's first two Hellboy films, being more aggressive and had horror elements which he had to encapsulate that, including Harbour's performance reflecting it.

== Track listing ==
No.	Title	Writer(s)	Artist(s)	Length
1.	"Big Red"			5:29
2.	"Psychic Migraine"			3:58
3.	"Gruagach"			1:52
4.	"You Call Us Monsters"			3:26
5.	"Baba Yaga"			3:29
6.	"A New Eden"			5:48
7.	"Destroyer of All Things"			4:33
8.	"Cathedral Fight"			7:32
9.	"Anung Un Rama"			2:16
10.	"This Isn't You"			4:34
11.	"Hellboy"			1:27
12.	"Rock Me Like a Hurricane" (Spanish Version)	Rudolf Schenker, Herman Rarebell and Klaus Meine	Unprotected Innocence (Micki Milosevic and Steph Honde)	4:14
Total length:				48:38

== Reception ==
Zanobard Reviews gave a 3/10 rating to the album, saying "Hellboy is a bizarre score, being an odd mishmash of orchestra and EDM which succeeds only in making the album a pretty generic, dull and sometimes genuinely painful listening experience." James Southall of Movie Wave, however, gave a positive review saying, "Wallfisch puts his foot to the floor and never lets it up – and while I don't like metal music at all, those who do will be in for a treat – and I can at least sit back and admire the effort that's been put into it." A reviewer based at Film Music Central wrote "The score isn't perfect by any means. Some of the action tracks are either too "[Hans] Zimmer like" (too bombastic for my taste) or too generic to me truly memorable. But the tracks that are good, are really good." Kyle Anderson of Nerdist News wrote "composer Benjamin Wallfisch offers up a mix of rock, electronic, and orchestra for a driving, hard-edged score to one of the hardest-edged heroes." Tim Grierson of Screen International called it a "clattering hard-rock soundtrack".

== Additional music ==
The list of songs featured in the film, but not included in the soundtrack:

- "Cumbia Raza" – performed by Los Lobos; written by Cesar Rosas
- "Malamente" – performed by Rosalía; written by Rosalía Vila, Pablo Diaz-Reixa and Antón Álvarez Alfaro
- "The Devil You Know" – performed by X Ambassadors; written by Sam Harris, Casey Harris and Adam Levin
- "Psycho" – performed by Muse; written by Matt Belamy
- "Figure It Out" – performed by Royal Blood; written by Michael James Kerr and Benjamin Peter Thatcher
- "Suffocation Blues" – performed by Black Pistol Fire; written by Kevin Mckeown
- "Anyone Who Had a Heart" – performed by Cilla Black; written by Burt Bacharach and David Hal
- "Beat the Devil's Tattoo" – performed by Black Rebel Motorcycle Club; written by Robert L. Been, Peter B Hayes, Leah Julie Shapiro
- "Knifing" – written and performed by Tony Lewis
- "Beethoven: Symphony No. 5" – arranged and performed by Tony Lewis and Mike Reed
- "16 Shots" – performed by Stefflon Don; written by Stephanie Allen, Fred Gibson
- "It Was Over Before It Even Begun" – written by Stephane Huguenin
- "Welcome to My Nightmare" – performed by Alice Cooper; written by Alice Cooper, Dick Wagner
- "Kickstart My Heart" – performed by Mötley Crüe
- "Mony Mony" – performed by Billy Idol (featured in the first trailer)
- "Smoke on the Water" – performed by 2WEI (featured in the second trailer)

== Personnel ==
Credits adapted from liner notes:

- Music composer and producer – Benjamin Wallfisch
- Additional music – Alex Lu, Antonio Andrade, Jared Fry
- Solo vocal – Faith Haro
- Engineer – Alex Ferguson
- Recording – Jake Jackson
- Mixing – Benjamin Wallfisch, Jake Jackson
- Supervising music editor – Tony Lewis
- Music editor – Arabella Winter
- Technical assistance – Michael Dean-Parsons
- Co-producer – Darrell Alexander
- Music preparation– Jill Streater
- Booklet editing and design – WLP Ltd.

The Chamber Orchestra of London

- Conductor – Chris Egan
- Orchestration – David Krystal
- Additional orchestration – Chris Ryan, Sebastian Winter, Alex Lu, Antonio Andrade, Jared Fry
- Orchestra contractor – Gareth Griffiths
- Orchestra leader – Janice Graham
- Pro-tools operator – Chris Barrett

Fame's Macedonian Symphonic Orchestra

- Conductor – Oleg Kondratenko
- Orchestra leader – Vladimir Kiselev
- Orchestra recording – Giorgi Hristovski
- Pro-tools recordist – Atanas Babaleski

Management

- Music supervisor (Millenium Media) – Selena Arizanovic
- Product development (Sony Classical) – Guido Eitberger
- Soundtrack acquisitions – Mark Cavell
- Director, film and TV music (Summit Entertainment) – Ryan Svendsen
- Director, film music (Summit Entertainment) – Nikki Triplett
- Marketing director (Millennium Media) – Rouslan Ovtcharoff
- Music finance executive (Summit Entertainment) – Chris Brown
- Vice president of music (Summit Entertainment) – Raha Johartchi
- Music business affairs (Summit Entertainment) – Heather Rajcic, Raha Johartchi
