= Wolf Man (2025 film) =

Film by Leigh Whannell

- Theatrical release poster
- Directed by: Leigh Whannell
- Written by: Leigh Whannell; Corbett Tuck
- Produced by: Jason Blum
- Starring: Christopher Abbott; Julia Garner; Sam Jaeger
- Cinematography: Stefan Duscio
- Edited by: Andy Canny
- Music by: Benjamin Wallfisch
- Production companies: Blumhouse Productions; Cloak & Co.
- Distributed by: Universal Pictures
- Release date: January 17, 2025
- Running time: 103 minutes
- Country: United States
- Language: English
- Budget: $25 million
- Box office: $36.8 million

Wolf Man is a 2025 American supernatural horror film directed and co-written by Leigh Whannell. A reboot of The Wolf Man franchise, the film stars Christopher Abbott, Julia Garner, and Sam Jaeger. The plot follows a family man seeking to protect his wife and daughter from a werewolf, only to become infected and slowly transform into the creature himself. Jason Blum produced alongside his Blumhouse Productions banner.

The film was announced in 2014 as part of the Dark Universe, a shared cinematic universe centered on the Universal Monsters. After the failure of The Mummy (2017), Universal shifted its focus to standalone films. The success of Whannell's The Invisible Man (2020) rekindled Universal's interest in the Monsters franchise. They accepted a pitch by Ryan Gosling, who was also set to star, for a new Wolf Man film with Derek Cianfrance to direct. However, Cianfrance left the project in 2023 and Gosling dropped out of the role, while Whannell took over as director with a new cast. Principal photography took place in New Zealand in early 2024.

Wolf Man was released in the United States by Universal Pictures on January 17, 2025. The film received mixed reviews from critics and grossed $36.8 million.

== Plot ==
In 1995, a hiker's vanishing in the remote mountains of Oregon sparks speculation about a virus transmitted by the region's wildlife, dubbed "hill fever" by locals but called ma'iingan odengwaan, or "Face of the Wolf", by earlier Native American tribes. During a hunting trip in the area, a young Blake Lovell spots a mysterious humanoid creature. His father Grady takes him to hide in an elevated hunting blind. Later that night, Grady radios his friend Dan Kiel about the beast, implied to be the infected hiker.

Thirty years later, Blake lives in San Francisco with his daughter Ginger and wife Charlotte, a journalist. Like his now-estranged father, he struggles to control his temper, and his marriage is strained. One day, he receives a death certificate for Grady, who went missing, and the keys to his childhood home. He decides to vacation there to pack up his father's belongings and try repairing his marriage.

Seeking directions in the forest, the family encounters Dan's son, Derek, who leads them to the house. Before they arrive, Blake swerves at the sight of a creature like the one he saw as a child. The creature scratches Blake's arm and kills Derek. Blake frantically leads his family to the house, barricading the entrance as the monster searches for weak spots. With his arm infected, Blake starts losing teeth and experiencing noise and odor sensitivity. The monster attacks Blake again through a pet door before Charlotte repels it with a hammer.

After Blake passes out and wakes up, Charlotte discovers he has lost some motor functions and his ability to speak and understand human language. He develops canine teeth and night vision, his hair thins on his head and grows in patches on his body, and his skin blotches. Before the family can drive away in Grady's old truck, the creature smashes the windshield, revealing itself as a werewolf and forcing them to seek shelter atop a greenhouse. Blake signals Charlotte to take Ginger back to the house and makes the monster follow him into the forest.

A limping and more deformed Blake soon returns. He tries to play a game with Ginger before he vomits one of the werewolf's fingers and menaces Charlotte. Regaining control, he prepares to leave to keep his family safe from the danger he is becoming, but the werewolf tackles him. In the ensuing battle, the monster acknowledges Blake as he fatally bites its throat. Recognizing a military tattoo on its arm, he realizes the werewolf is Grady. Outside, Blake undergoes his final skeletal changes, with claws forcing out his fingernails, and his vision becomes warped. Still self-aware but unable to restrain his primal instincts, he breaks back into the house. Charlotte slashes his hand with a knife and escapes with Ginger.

Blake claws his way into a barn and is caught by a foothold trap Charlotte laid down. He chews off his ensnared foot and continues pursuing his family, who hide in Grady's hunting blind as the sun rises. Charlotte holds her approaching husband at gunpoint, and Blake motions for her to shoot. Ginger, described earlier as always able to tell what her father is thinking, affirms that Blake is in pain and wants to die. Blake breaks through the door, and Charlotte fatally shoots him. The dying Blake enjoys the comfort of his family, who look out into a beautiful valley he once described seeing as a child.

== Cast ==
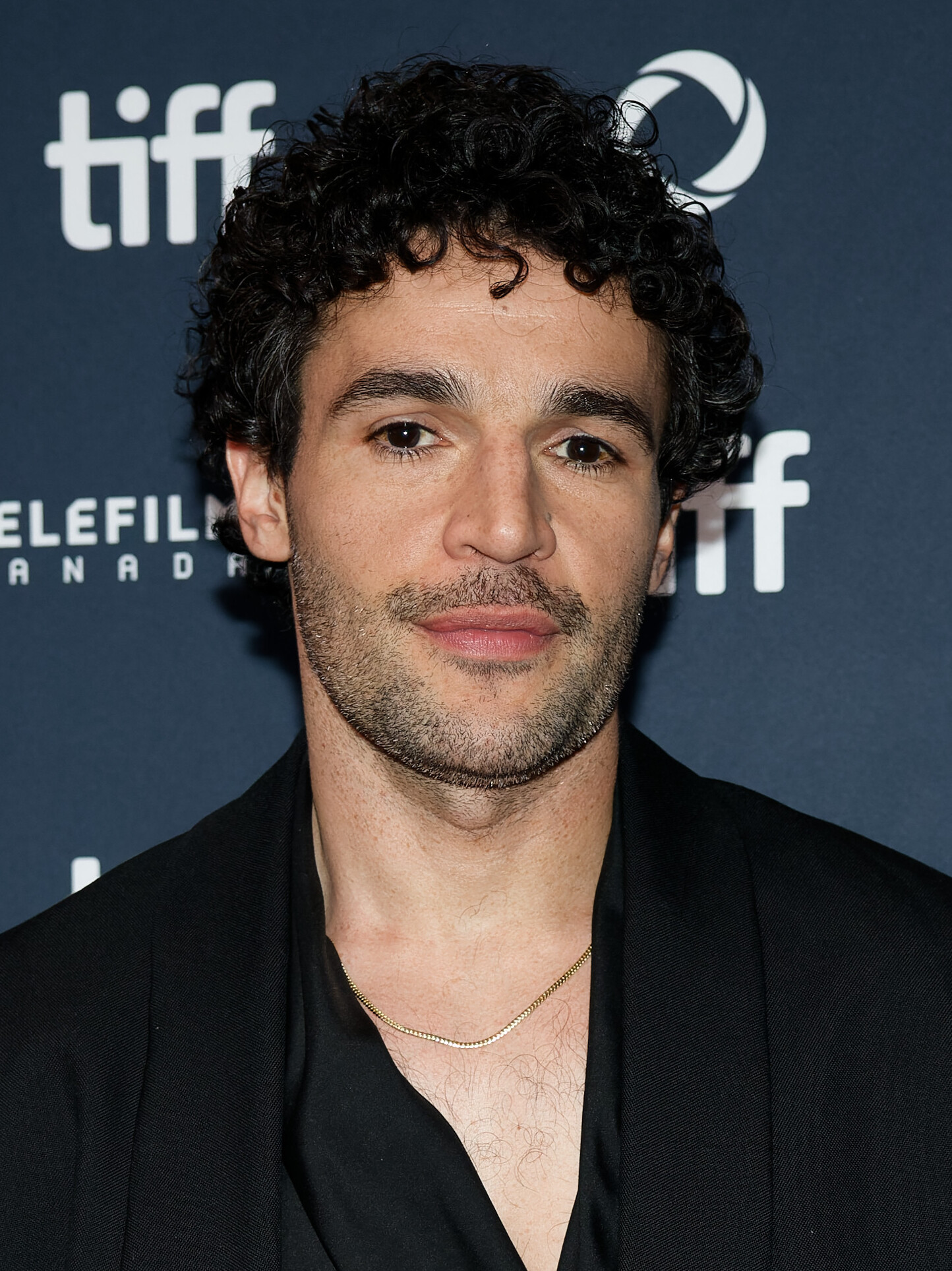
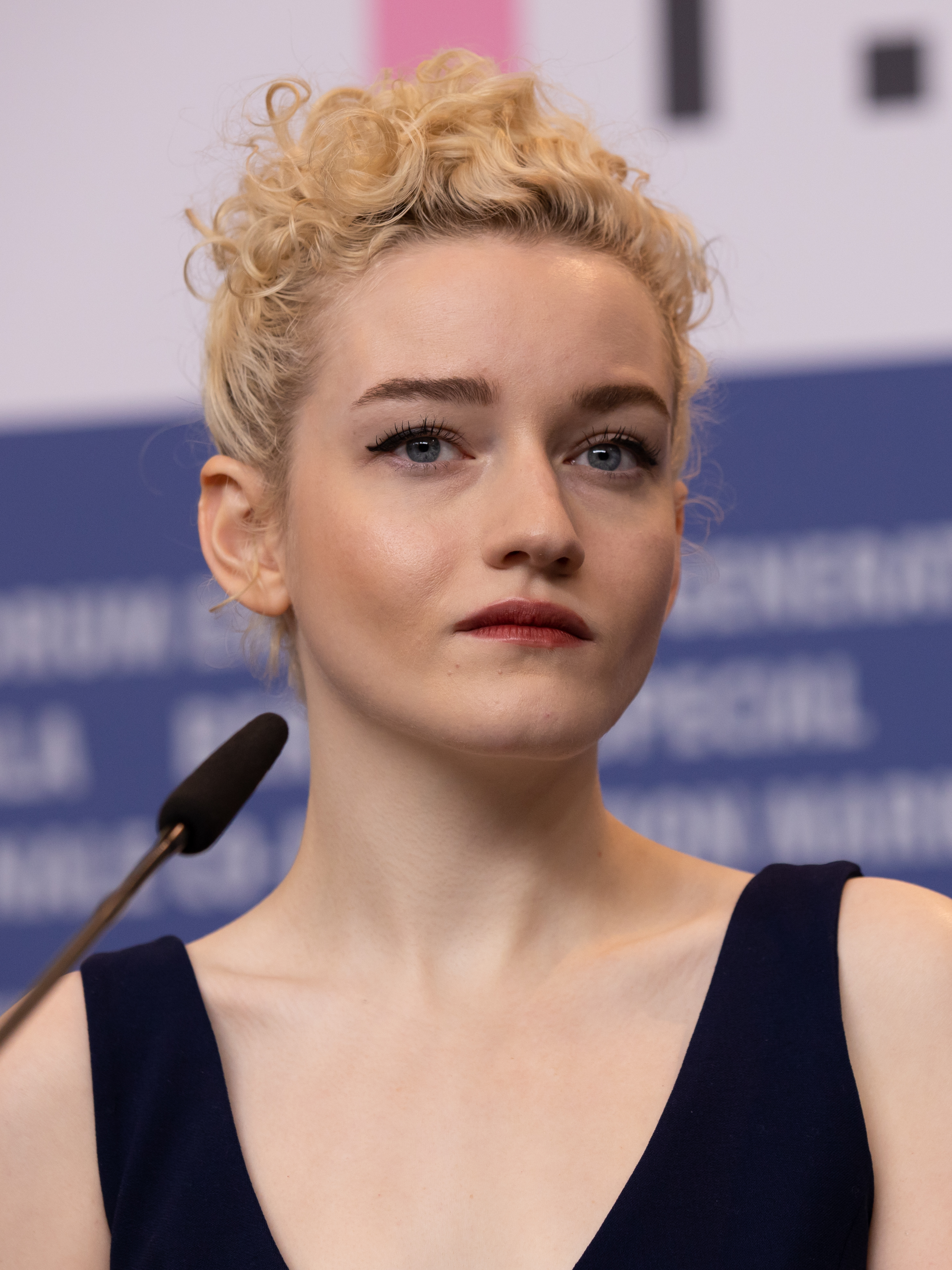
The film stars Christopher Abbott (left) and Julia Garner as Blake and Charlotte Lovell, respectively.
- Christopher Abbott as Blake Lovell, a writer
  - Zac Chandler as young Blake Lovell
- Julia Garner as Charlotte Lovell, a journalist and Blake's wife
- Matilda Firth as Ginger Lovell, Blake and Charlotte's daughter
- Sam Jaeger as Grady Lovell, Blake's estranged father, Ginger's grandfather and Charlotte's father-in-law
  - Ben Prendergast as Grady's werewolf form
- Benedict Hardie as Derek Kiel, an old friend of Blake
- Milo Cawthorne as a homeless man in San Francisco whom Ginger runs into before Blake shoos him away
- Leigh Whannell as the voice of Dan Kiel, Derek's father, who turns down Grady's suggestion to hunt a hiker-turned-werewolf lurking outside his house

== Production ==
=== Development ===
In July 2014, Universal Pictures announced its plan for a shared cinematic franchise, later dubbed Dark Universe, centered on their Universal Monsters library — which was to include The Wolf Man. In November 2014, Aaron Guzikowski was confirmed to be writing the reboot of Universal's The Wolf Man. In June 2016, Deadline Hollywood reported on rumors that Dwayne Johnson was considered for the titular role. In October, David Callaham was hired to rewrite the script. In 2017, The Mummy was released as the first film in the Dark Universe; its launch was both a critical and commercial failure and resulted in Universal deciding to shift its focus on individual storytelling and move away from the shared universe concept with the cancelation of The Wolf Man and other films in development.

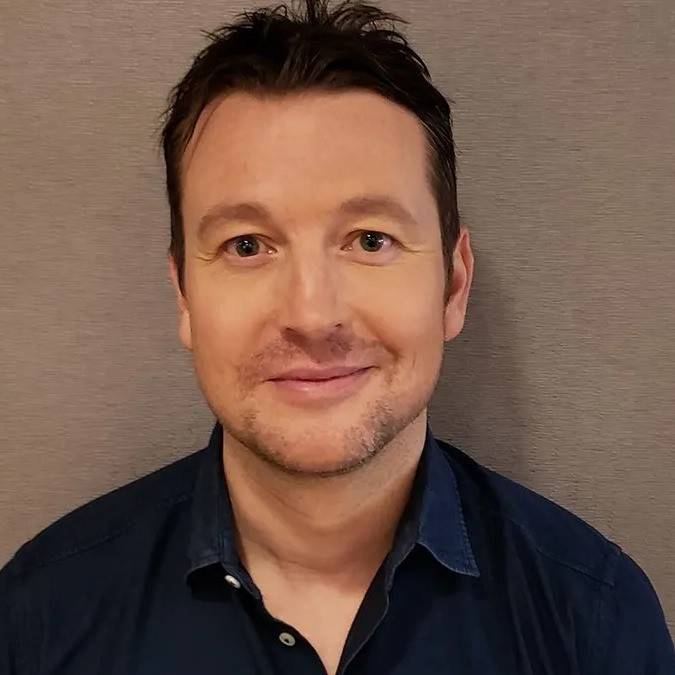
The success of Whannell's previous monster film inspired Universal to make Wolf Man.

Reporter Justin Kroll said the critical and commercial success of Leigh Whannell's The Invisible Man for Universal "scrap[ped] the universe concept" and loosened restrictions for the talent in front and behind the camera, allowing them to decide how they wanted to execute their films in terms of budget and MPAA rating and invite "big name talent" to pitch their ideas. By early 2020, Universal had been hearing project ideas for a year and a half from filmmakers seeking to develop characters in the franchise. These meetings included Ryan Gosling's pitch to remake The Wolf Man and star in it, with Lauren Schuker Blum and Rebecca Angelo writing a screenplay described as tonally similar to Nightcrawler (2014). Around this time, make-up artist Mike Marino molded an early version of the werewolf.

Several filmmakers were considered to direct, including Cory Finley, whose film Thoroughbreds (2017) was reportedly well liked by Universal, and Whannell, who was advised by Jason Blum of Blumhouse Productions (producer of several of his projects, including The Invisible Man) to reconsider after initially declining. (In February 2020, Whannell had mentioned his interest in making a werewolf film during a press interview for The Invisible Man.) In July 2020, Whannell entered negotiations to write a film treatment and direct. He and his wife Corbett Tuck co-wrote the first draft of their version by pulling from the feeling of confinement and isolation caused by the COVID-19 pandemic to touch on the inevitability of illness and death, setting the story primarily in one location to make the drama "intimate", and drawing from themes of parenting and marriage. The disease that the main character contracts in the film is meant to resemble neurodegenerative diseases like ALS, which killed a close friend of Whannell's; a deleted scene involved Blake's ALS-stricken mother.

=== Pre-production ===
After Whannell left the project due to scheduling conflicts, Derek Cianfrance entered negotiations to write and direct in October 2021, having directed Gosling in Blue Valentine (2010) and The Place Beyond the Pines (2012). The film was officially green lit around the conclusion of the 2023 Hollywood strikes. In December 2023, Cianfrance and Gosling were reported to have exited the project due to scheduling conflicts, with Whannell returning to take over directing the screenplay he co-wrote with Tuck, while Cianfrance received off-screen additional literary material credit. Gosling, who retained an executive producer credit, was replaced by Christopher Abbott in the lead role. Abbott was the first actor Whannell approached for the role over Zoom, being familiar with his work; the next day, Whannell saw Abbott perform the off-Broadway play Danny and the Deep Blue Sea (2023) opposite Aubrey Plaza at the Lucille Lortel Theatre in the West Village of Manhattan while in crutches due to a shattered kneecap, which sealed his decision to cast him.

During pre-production, Whannell hosted weekly film screenings for his crew in a theater inside the studio where the film was shot, with selections such as The Shining (1980), The Thing (1982), The Fly (1986), Little Children (2006), Blue Valentine (2010), Amour (2012), and Under the Skin (2013). In 2024, Julia Garner, Sam Jaeger, and Matilda Firth joined the cast. Wolf Man was the third project between Abbott and Garner, after Martha Marcy May Marlene (2011) and a fifth-season episode of Girls (2016). To prepare for the role, Abbott watched hours of animal videos on YouTube to grasp the wolf's body language. Garner interviewed working mothers about societal pressures put on women and suggested that her character go through the seven stages of grief over the course of the film, which takes place over one night, after reading books on grief and loss.

=== Filming ===
Principal photography began on March 17, 2024, with New Zealand standing in for Oregon. Forest scenes were shot in the South Island's Queenstown, while sets for the farmstead—the house, barn, and greenhouse—were built inside Wellington's Lane Street Studios in the North Island, with Upper Hutt as the production's base camp. The house's exterior was constructed on a nearby farm in Mangaroa. Ruby Mathers was the production designer. Whannell and director of photography Stefan Duscio (their third film after Upgrade and The Invisible Man) were influenced by cinematographer Roger Deakins' "grounded approach" to Prisoners (2013) and Sicario (2015). Light shifts to convey change in character perspectives were accomplished practically on set by manually adjusting the lights. The moving truck that drives off a cliff had to be imported from the United States to have the driver's seat on the left. The special effects team took six days to dismantle, lighten, and reassemble it onto a custom support frame; the work had to be completed without welding, cutting, or grinding because of a fire ban resulting from a dry spell in the area. A 50 feet (15 m) Technocrane was used for the greenhouse sequence.

Arjen Tuiten and Pamela Goldammer were the prosthetics & special make-up effects designer and key artist, respectively. Whannell compiled a list of werewolf designs, such as those portrayed by Lon Chaney Jr. in the original The Wolf Man (1941) and David Naughton in An American Werewolf in London (1981) and those included in The Howling (1981) and Dog Soldiers (2002), before settling on one; he was inspired by Heath Ledger's take on the Joker in forming an original design for an established character. Whannell went with Tuiten's first design of the werewolf, which Tuiten first showed him by making a life-sized model. Applying the prosthetics on Abbott took two and a half to seven and a half hours depending on the stage of the transformation.

=== Post-production ===
Vocal distortion to convey Blake's diminishing ability to understand the human language was done by layering the dialogue on top of it in reverse. Composer Benjamin Wallfisch and editor Andy Canny, who both worked on The Invisible Man, returned for Wolf Man. Like The Invisible Man, the score was recorded at AIR Studios in London. For the final piece, "Goodbye", which plays during the film's ending, Whannell asked Wallfisch, who had initially written "something kind of spare and haunting" for the scene, to compose a track for the film to end on a "big emotional note" inspired by the closer, "Denouement", for the soundtrack of The Invisible Man. Sound mixing was completed at Warner Bros. Studios Burbank. Visual effects were employed for the character's increasingly animalistic perspective to add haze, computer-generated insects, translucent skin to reveal veins, and flashing eyes with retroreflective highlights. The film cost $25 million to produce.

== Marketing and release ==
In August 2024, during Universal's Halloween Horror Nights in Orlando, a booth revealed the film's logo and teaser image, and on September 4, an actor took the stage for a photo-op performing as Grady's werewolf form. The werewolf design—an unconventionally human-like creature with sparse fur, a "balding head", "long white hair on the back of his head and as facial hair", "long, bony fingers", and "sharp teeth"—drew divisive reactions from online users and journalists, causing the exhibition to be removed after one night. (Note: Attributed to multiple sources.) On September 6, Universal released a teaser trailer, poster, and synopsis. Hannah Shaw-Williams of /Film suggested that the timing of the teaser's release was "damage control" over the poorly received werewolf design, noting the absence of the titular creature in the teaser.

Whannell described the design reveal as a "debacle", as Universal did it without discussing it with him or the film's make-up artist Arjen Tuiten; he unsuccessfully tried stopping it by calling Jason Blum and later recounted that it was "like judging the Freddy Krueger makeup by a costume at Spirit Halloween." Social media analytics firm RelishMix reported that online marketing led to 136.5 million interactions, 50% behind the average for a wide horror release. Summarizing word of mouth from audiences, it wrote, "Mixed negative-leaning chatter on Wolf Man finds some viewers taking umbrage with the look of the film, from the cinematography to the design of the titular creature."

Wolf Man was released in the United States by Universal Pictures on January 17, 2025, including engagements in IMAX, 4DX, ScreenX, and D-Box. It was previously scheduled to be released on October 25, 2024. The film's Hollywood premiere at the TCL Chinese Theatre on January 7 was canceled because of the Palisades Fire.

== Reception ==
=== Box office ===
Wolf Man grossed $20.7 million in the United States and Canada and $16.1 million in other territories, for a worldwide total of $36.8 million.

In the United States and Canada, Wolf Man was released alongside One of Them Days and was projected to gross $15–21 million from 3,354 theaters in its opening four-day MLK weekend. Variety said the wildfires in Los Angeles were not expected to affect the film's box office performance, and that audience reception would determine its success. The film made $4.5 million on its first day, including an estimated $1.4 million from Thursday night previews. It went on to debut to $10.9 million in its opening weekend (and a total of $12.3 million over the four-day frame), coming below projections and finishing third at the box office behind One of Them Days and holdover Mufasa: The Lion King (in its fifth weekend). Deadline Hollywood noted that the opening was less than the $17.9 million opening for Wolf in 1994 (unadjusted for inflation). IMAX and premium large format screens accounted for 41% of the opening box office, and exit polling indicated that 50% of attendees saw the film because of the genre.

In its second weekend, the film finished seventh at the box office after adding $3.4 million; Screen Rant described the 70.2% drop as "severe" and "unusual even by the standards of the horror genre", comparing it to the 72% second-weekend drop experienced by Blumhouse's box-office flop Afraid in 2024. On January 26, producer Jason Blum expressed his disappointment with the film's box office performance in a since-deleted tweet. The film dropped out of the box office top ten in its third weekend.

=== Critical response ===
On the review aggregator website Rotten Tomatoes, 47% of 285 critics' reviews are positive, with an average rating of 5.6/10. The website's consensus reads: "Director Leigh Whannell's attempt at bringing a fresh psychological dimension to the Wolf Man comes at the expense of proper scares, although fans of body horror will still find some tasty morsels to chew on." Metacritic, which uses a weighted average, assigned the film a score of 50 out of 100, based on 49 critics, indicating "mixed or average" reviews. Audiences polled by CinemaScore gave the film an average grade of "C–" on an A+ to F scale, while those surveyed by PostTrak gave it a 54% overall positive score, with 34% saying they would "definitely recommend" it.

Positive reviews came from The Hollywood Reporter, criticizing the dialogue but praising the performances and tension. The Chicago Tribune described the film as offering a "crafty, patient and deceptively good" first half but a plodding second. NME gave it four stars out of five, writing that despite an unconvincing creature design and heavy-handed themes, the film has energetic pacing and delivers intense, claustrophobic action sequences. Rolling Stone opined that the film ambitiously blends body horror and familial trauma with allegorical weight, but while it delivers gripping moments and good performances, it ultimately falls short with familiar horror tropes and uneven execution. In a more mixed review, Time Out called it an atmospheric and occasionally unsettling exploration of fatherhood and transformation that, despite Abbott's best efforts and effective body horror moments, lacked the emotional depth and scares needed to elevate it to the level of its influences like The Fly (1986).

Vulture was critical of Whannell's decision to make the movie about the transformation. They described the film as visually striking but underdeveloped, with suspenseful set pieces but shallow characterizations and an underwhelming exploration of its themes, leaving it feeling incomplete and emotionally weightless. IndieWire labeled Wolf Man a missed opportunity, blending what they called a promising premise about parental fears with an underwhelming execution marked by unconvincing special effects, a lack of genuine tension, and a muddled exploration of its themes, succumbing to predictable storytelling and uninspired horror elements despite Whannell's attempts to bring a grounded emotional core to the classic monster. The Associated Press lambasted the film as a sluggish, underwhelming reboot that squandered its classic monster premise with muddled themes, uninspired scares, and a lack of emotional or narrative depth, rating it zero out of four stars.

=== Accolades ===
Award	Date of ceremony	Category	Recipient(s)	Result	Ref.
Hollywood Music in Media Awards	November 19, 2025	Original Score – Horror/Thriller Film	Benjamin Wallfisch	Won	
