= The Invisible Man (soundtrack) =

The Invisible Man (Original Motion Picture Soundtrack)

Film score by Benjamin Wallfisch
- Released: February 21, 2020
- Recorded: 2019–2020
- Genre: Film score
- Length: 49:32
- Label: Back Lot Music
- Producer: Benjamin Wallfisch

Benjamin Wallfisch chronology
It Chapter Two (Original Motion Picture Soundtrack) (2019)	The Invisible Man (2020)	Mortal Kombat (Original Motion Picture Soundtrack) (2021)

The Invisible Man (Original Motion Picture Soundtrack) is the score album to the 2020 film The Invisible Man, inspired by H. G. Wells' novel of the same name. Composed by Benjamin Wallfisch, the album was released on February 21, 2020 by Back Lot Music, a week before the film's release. Wallfisch used string orchestra to compose for the film, mimicking Bernard Herrmann's technique for the score of Psycho (1960), while blending synth and electronic music. It was released on vinyl editions by Death Waltz Recording Company and Mondo on June 5, 2020.

== Background ==
Benjamin Wallfisch composed the film's score, who recalled that he was approached by the film's team through phone call imagining an interpretation of how a classic film should look like. He watched the final edit and impressed by Elisabeth Moss' performance which he called it as "powerful" and agreed to be a part of the film. Wallfisch said:

"the film is incredibly visceral and quite stylized in the sense that it feels almost like a classic Hitchcockian thriller, but with a very modern take. And the film isn't afraid to upend a lot of the expectations one might have from a horror/thriller genre. It's a very unique and extraordinarily well-crafted film, and very precise in its choices, editorially, and how the audience is really kept absolutely on the edge of their seat throughout. Leigh's vision was to have the music very much as a character, and not just as underscore. We really wanted the score to take an active role in the experience of the film. A lot of it was about articulating and using silence in a very rhythmic way. By that I mean: when there is music, it tends to be very left field, bold and quite extreme. So you almost don't trust the absence of music when there's silence. By doing that the silence almost becomes a musical event. There are very careful structural choices that were made to maximize that."

== Composition ==
Inspiring Bernard Herrmann's composition style for Psycho (1960), for which he used a string orchestra, Wallfisch replicated the same technique for writing the score, claiming it as "a love letter to Herrmann in his way". He added "For a long time I wanted to write a score where, in terms of the orchestration, it's only strings, because the string players are really pushed to their absolute max when they don't have the support of a full orchestra. It's a much more intense sound in many ways, when you're asking just strings to play as if they're a full orchestra. That was the orchestral choice for this score." But in addition of strings, he further used electronic and synth music to give "a twisted and nervy edge".

He called the score as almost like weaponizing silence, saying "When the score isn't there, you almost don't trust almost it the way you don't trust the empty spaces on the screen". Hence he did not underscore for the film so that they need the audience to "specifically time the moments and thinking about how that cue ends and how that cue begins so that moment feels so tense".

For Cecilia and Adrian, there is a deliberate contrast between their music. Cecilia's theme consisted of a cello which had been heard three to four times in some key sequences. He used unusual mixing techniques that "sometimes surrounding the audience with a wall of sound, and sometimes only using one microphone on one violin". Adrian's theme consisted of electronic and synth music, as the character mastered the science of invisibility. He thought of how that sounds technologically if it embodied music as a result, he influenced on electronic dance music to produce a "dark, gritty and cinematic" sound. He also had a synth leitmotif that "shifts in tone throughout and gives him presence even when you can't see him".

== Track listing ==
No.	Title	Length
1.	"Cobolt"	1:42
2.	"Escape"	4:28
3.	"He's Gone"	3:37
4.	"This Is What He Does"	2:19
5.	"We've Got That In Common"	1:21
6.	"Make It Rain"	2:22
7.	"Attack"	2:46
8.	"Why Me"	3:00
9.	"The Suit"	2:15
10.	"Asylum"	3:31
11.	"He's Behind You"	4:42
12.	"House Fight"	5:34
13.	"It's All a Lie"	5:26
14.	"Surprise"	1:32
15.	"Denouement"	4:57
Total length:		49:32

== Reception ==
Filmtracks.com reviewed "Wallfisch's The Invisible Man is hypnotically gorgeous and gratingly repulsive all in one, forcing the listener to edit together 15 to 20 minutes of the score's more effective half on album for a worthwhile tribute to the suspense masters." Zanobard Reviews wrote "The Invisible Man isn't a perfect score by any means, but it is an effective one – where it does succeed, it does so incredibly well. The deep, in-your-face electronics for the titular character in Cobolt, the sombre, eloquent strings that add an eerie edge to the calming finale of Denouement – these are some excellent examples of where Benjamin Wallfisch really hits the mark here in his atmospheric musical effort. Things do slow down in terms of interesting cues through the middle of the album, but the more interesting tracks on either side make up for it with ominous atmospheric scoring and solemn yet horror-like utilisation of strings. In essence, if you listened to Blade Runner 2049 and thought it might work better as a horror score, then this is the album for you." James Southall of Movie Wave wrote "It all comes together into a score which on the one hand is a seriously impressive execution of a vision, and on the other is one I never want to hear again".

Film Music Central wrote "Wallfisch really appears to be ratcheting up the tension with this soundtrack as well, as each track is just full of it. Even the tracks that don't contain references to the Invisible Man are full of subtle tensions (which you would expect in a horror film), as if the next encounter could happen at any moment. It was enjoyable to listen to, but also more than a little nerve wracking since after a while you come to expect that at some point the Invisible Man sonic will jump in and surprise you." Jeff Ames of ComingSoon.net wrote "The Invisible Man lacks a proper theme to guide the music from A to B. And so, while the sound design adds plenty of atmospheric tension within the context of the film, the score as heard on the soundtrack album does little more than induce headaches. A soft piano interlude (reminiscent of James Horner's Flightplan) appears occasionally to offer a slight reprieve from the chaos, but otherwise there simply is not enough material here to warrant praise. And that's too bad. For all the comparisons to Alfred Hitchcock's classic films, The Invisible Man forgot to bring along one key element: the classic film score."

Jamie Greene of The Roarbots commented: "Wallfisch cranks out a dual-purpose soundtrack here. Half of it is an old-school orchestral score that delivers a sound not entirely unlike the classic Universal films. The other half is an electronic, dubstep-infused wall of sound that conveys an intensity I only hope the movie can match." Jack Pooley of WhatCulture praised Wallfisch's score commenting that "it is employed to brilliantly bombastic effect at a number of critical junctures - especially during the more chaotic third act - in turn evoking the operatic tenor of the earlier Invisible Man movies. Above all else, the score accentuates the strong feeling of dread pervading throughout, and despite the project's low budget, the music has a strong sense of identity."

== Personnel ==
Credits adapted from CD liner notes.

Production

- Music written and produced by – Benjamin Wallfisch
- Synth programming – Jared Fry
- Recording – Rupert Coulson, Jack Mills
- Pro-tools recordist – Chris Barrett
- Mixing – Benjamin Wallfisch, Scott Smith, Kaitlyn Delle Donne
- Mastering – Pat Sullivan
- Music editor – Devaughn Watts, Brett "Snacky" Pierce
- Music supervision – Rachel Levy
- Technician – Michael Dean Parsons
- Score co-ordinator – Darrell Alexander
- Music preparation – Jill Streater

Instruments and orchestra

- Cello soloist – Justin Lepard
- Orchestra – The Chamber Orchestra Of London
- Orchestrations – David Krystal
- Concertmaster – Igor Yuzefovich
- Orchestra conductor – Christopher Egan
- Orchestra contractor – Gareth Griffiths

Management

- Music business and legal affairs – David Flanzer, Tanya Perara
- Executive in charge of music – Michael Knobloch
- Marketing – Nikki Walsh
- Production manager – Andy Kalyvas, Shannon Smith

Artwork

- Art direction – Spencer Hickman
- Design – Mo Shafeek
- Liner notes – Leigh Whannell
