= Benjamin Wallfisch =

English film composer (born 1979)

- Born: Benjamin Mark Lasker Wallfisch; 7 August 1979 (age 47); London, England
- Genre: Film score
- Occupations: Composer; conductor; orchestrator; music producer
- Instruments: Piano; keyboards; synthesizer
- Years active: 2003–present
- Website: benjaminwallfisch.com

Benjamin Mark Lasker Wallfisch (born 7 August 1979) is an English composer, conductor, and music producer known for his work on film scores. He has contributed to over 50 feature films since the mid-2000s, including notable works like Blade Runner 2049 (2017), Shazam! (2019), It (2017), It Chapter Two (2019), The Invisible Man (2020), Hidden Figures, A Cure for Wellness (both 2016), Mortal Kombat (2021), and its 2026 sequel, The Flash (2023), Twisters, Alien: Romulus, Kraven the Hunter (all 2024), and The Conjuring: Last Rites (2025). He additionally provided the score for two films in the Predator franchise, including Predator: Killer of Killers and Predator: Badlands (both 2025).

His work has earned recognition including a joint nomination with Pharrell Williams and Hans Zimmer for Best Original Score at the 74th Golden Globe Awards for Hidden Figures, as well as nominations for the BAFTA Award for Best Film Music and the Grammy Award for Best Score Soundtrack for Visual Media for Blade Runner 2049. In 2020, Wallfisch was nominated for Film Composer of the Year for the second consecutive year at the World Soundtrack Awards.

Wallfisch's movies have made a combined worldwide box office revenue of over $2.5 billion. In 2019, Variety included him in their Billion Dollar Composer series.

== Early life ==
Benjamin Mark Lasker Wallfisch was born on 7 August 1979 in London, England, to Elizabeth Wallfisch (née Hunt), an Australian Baroque violinist, and Raphael Wallfisch, a British cellist. He is the eldest of their three children. His paternal grandparents are pianist Peter Wallfisch and cellist Anita Lasker-Wallfisch, the latter of whom was a Holocaust survivor who, as a member of the Women's Orchestra of Auschwitz, was saved from extermination, as cello players were hard to replace. They were Jewish emigrants from the city of Breslau, Germany (now Wrocław, Poland). His great-grandfather was conductor Albert Coates.

== Career ==
Wallfisch has been nominated for multiple awards, including a Golden Globe Award, a BAFTA Award, two Grammy Awards, and two Emmy Awards. He composed Andy Muschietti's It, It Chapter Two, It: Welcome to Derry, and The Flash, David F. Sandberg's Shazam!, Leigh Whannell's The Invisible Man, co-composed Denis Villeneuve's Blade Runner 2049 with Hans Zimmer, and wrote the score for Simon McQuoid's Mortal Kombat for New Line Cinema and Warner Bros.

Other projects include Neil Marshall's Hellboy, Academy Award Best Picture nominee Ted Melfi's Hidden Figures (in collaboration with Pharrell Williams and Hans Zimmer), and David F. Sandberg's Annabelle: Creation. He contributed music based on Elgar's "Enigma' Variations" for Christopher Nolan's Dunkirk.

Wallfisch has also scored Gore Verbinski's A Cure for Wellness, the Steven Spielberg produced short film Auschwitz, directed by James Moll, James Marsh's King of Thieves, and Steven Knight's Serenity.

Wallfisch has released 25 albums and has performed over 100 live concerts worldwide, leading orchestras such as the London Philharmonic, Philharmonia, Los Angeles Philharmonic, Los Angeles Chamber Orchestra and the Sydney Symphony at venues including the Hollywood Bowl, Sydney Opera House and Royal Festival Hall. He has collaborated, recorded, and performed his music with artists including Lang Lang, Herbie Hancock and Yuja Wang.

He has collaborated with Pharrell Williams three times, including a live performance at the 2015 Grammy Awards, and he arranged Adele's 2017 Grammy Awards performance of George Michael's "Fastlove".

Wallfisch has been a member of the BAFTA Academy since 2009, was appointed an Associate of the Royal Academy of Music in 2014, and was invited to join the Academy of Motion Picture Arts and Sciences in 2017.

== Personal life ==
Wallfisch resides in Los Angeles, California, with his daughter.

== Discography ==
=== Film ===
==== As primary score composer ====
Year	Title	Director(s)	Studio(s)	Notes
2005	Dear Wendy	Thomas Vinterberg	Lucky Punch; Nimbus Film Productions; Zentropa Entertainments; TV2 Danmark; Zentropa International Köln	Nominated – Robert Award for Best Score
2008	The Escapist	Rupert Wyatt	Picture Farm; Parallel Film Productions; Vertigo Films	—N/a
2009	In Search of the Messiah	Tim Meara	Meara Films	Documentary film
2012	Fetih 1453	Faruk Aksoy	Aksoy Film; Medyapim	—N/a
2013	Hours	Eric Heisserer	The Safran Company; PalmStar Media; Hours Capital	As composer and conductor
2013	Hammer of the Gods	Farren Blackburn	Vertigo Films; Magnolia Pictures	Nominated – Hollywood Music in Media Award for Best Original Song
2013	Summer in February	Christopher Menaul	CrossDay Productions Ltd. Apart Films; Marwood Pictures	Hollywood Music in Media Award for Best Original Score
2014	Desert Dancer	Richard Raymond	CrossDay Productions Ltd. Head Gear Films; Lipsync Productions	—N/a
2014	Bhopal: A Prayer for Rain	Ravi Kumar	Rising Star Entertainment; Wardour Media Group; Sahara One Motion Pictures	—N/a
2015	Auschwitz	James Moll	Allentown Productions	Documentary film
2015	A Flickering Truth	Pietra Brettkelly	PBK Limited; Umbrella Entertainment	Documentary film
2015	Gamba	Tomohiro Kawamura; Yoshihiro Komori	Arad Productions; Grindstone Pictures; Shirogumi	—N/a
2015	Pressure	Ron Scalpello	Pinewood Pictures; Vertical Entertainment	—N/a
2015	Within	Phil Claydon	The Safran Company; New Line Cinema; Warner Bros.	—N/a
2016	Lights Out	David F. Sandberg	New Line Cinema; RatPac-Dune Entertainment; Grey Matter Productions; Atomic Monster	First collaboration with David F. Sandberg, as composer and conductor
2016	Mully	Scott Haze	Bardis Productions; Sterling Light Productions	Documentary film
2016	Hidden Figures	Theodore Melfi	Fox 2000 Pictures; Levantine Films; Chernin Entertainment	Composed with Hans Zimmer and Pharrell Williams; Nominated – Black Reel Award for Outstanding Original Score; Nominated – Golden Globe Award for Best Original Score; Nominated – Grammy Award for Best Score Soundtrack for Visual Media. Orchestra conducted by Timothy Williams; First collaboration with Theodore Melfi
2016	A Cure for Wellness	Gore Verbinski	20th Century Fox; Regency Enterprises; New Regency Productions; Blind Wink Productions	Orchestra Conducted by Gavin Greenaway
2017	Bitter Harvest	George Mendeluk	Devil's Harvest Productions; Roadside Attractions; D Films	As composer and conductor
2017	Annabelle: Creation	David F. Sandberg	New Line Cinema; Warner Bros. Pictures; Atomic Monster; Grey Matter Productions	Second collaboration With David F. Sandberg, orchestra conducted by Timothy Williams
2017	It	Andy Muschietti	New Line Cinema; Warner Bros. Pictures; Vertigo Entertainment	First collaboration with Andy Muschietti
2017	Blade Runner 2049	Denis Villeneuve	Warner Bros. Pictures; Columbia Pictures; Alcon Entertainment; Scott Free Productions	Composed with Hans Zimmer; Replaced Jóhann Jóhannsson; Themes by Vangelis; Nominated – BAFTA Award for Best Film Music; Nominated – Critics' Choice Movie Award for Best Score; Nominated – Grammy Award for Best Score Soundtrack for Visual Media; Nominated – Hollywood Music in Media Award for Best Original Score in a Sci-Fi/Fantasy/Horror Film
2018	The Darkest Minds	Jennifer Yuh Nelson	20th Century Fox; 21 Laps Entertainment	Orchestra conducted by Timothy Williams & Benjamin Wallfisch
2018	King of Thieves	James Marsh	Working Title Films; StudioCanal UK	Orchestra conducted by Chris Egan
2018	The Vanishing	Kristoffer Nyholm	Cross Creek Pictures; Saban Entertainment; Lionsgate Films	—N/a
2019	Serenity	Steven Knight	IM Global	Additional music by Antonio Andrade, orchestra conducted by Geoff Alexander
2019	Shazam!	David F. Sandberg	DC Films; New Line Cinema; Warner Bros. Pictures; The Safran Company	Third collaboration with David F. Sandberg. Orchestra Conducted by Chris Egan & Benjamin Wallfisch
2019	Hellboy	Neil Marshall	Millennium Films; Dark Horse Entertainment	Additional music by Antonio Andrade, Jared Fly & Alex Lu. Orchestra conducted by Chris Egan and performed by The Chamber Orchestra of London
2019	It Chapter Two	Andy Muschietti	New Line Cinema; Warner Bros. Pictures; Vertigo Entertainment	Second collaboration with Andy Muschietti, Orchestra conducted By Arturo Rodriguez
2020	The Invisible Man	Leigh Whannell	Universal Pictures; Blumhouse	Orchestra conducted by Chris Egan, performed by The Chamber Orchestra of London; Hollywood Music in Media Award for Best Original Score in a Horror Film
2021	Mortal Kombat	Simon McQuoid	Warner Bros. Pictures; New Line Cinema; Atomic Monster; Broken Road Productions	Orchestra conducted By Brett Kelly & Christopher Gordon
2021	The Starling	Theodore Melfi	Netflix; Limelight; Entertainment One; Boies/Schiller Film Group	Second collaboration with Theodore Melfi, Orchestra Conducted By Geoff Alexander and Performed by Chamber Orchestra of London
2022	Thirteen Lives	Ron Howard	United Artists Releasing; Metro-Goldwyn-Mayer; Universal Pictures; Bron Creative; Imagine Entertainment	Orchestra conducted By Chris Egan & performed By Chamber Orchestra of London
2023	The Flash	Andy Muschietti	Warner Bros. Pictures; DC Studios; The Disco Factory; Double Dream	Third collaboration with Andy Muschietti. Orchestra conducted by Chris Egan & Wallfisch and performed By Chamber Orchestra of London
2024	Twisters	Lee Isaac Chung	Universal Pictures; Warner Bros. Pictures; Amblin Entertainment	Also orchestra conductor with Arturo Rodriguez
2024	Alien: Romulus	Fede Álvarez	20th Century Studios; Scott Free Productions; Brandywine Productions	Orchestra conducted By Chris Egan and performed by Chamber Orchestra of London
2024	Kraven the Hunter	J. C. Chandor	Columbia Pictures; Marvel Entertainment; Arad Productions; Matt Tolmach Productions	Composed with Evgueni Galperine and Sacha Galperine
2025	Wolf Man	Leigh Whannell	Universal Pictures; Blumhouse Productions; Motel Movies; Waypoint Entertainment; Cloak & Co.	—N/a
2025	Until Dawn	David F. Sandberg	Sony Pictures Releasing; Screen Gems; PlayStation Productions; Vertigo Entertainment; Coin Operated; Mangata	Fourth collaboration with David F. Samberg
2025	Predator: Killer of Killers	Dan Trachtenberg; Micho Robert Rutare	Hulu; 20th Century Studios; 20th Century Animation; Davis Entertainment; The Third Floor, Inc.	First collaboration with Dan Trachtenberg. First composition for an animated film. Predator themes by Alan Silvestri
2025	The Conjuring: Last Rites	Michael Chaves	New Line Cinema; Atomic Monster; The Safran Company	The Conjuring themes by Joseph Bishara
2025	The Woman in Cabin 10	Simon Stone	Netflix; Sister; Gotham Group	—N/a
2025	Predator: Badlands	Dan Trachtenberg	20th Century Studios	Second collaboration with Dan Trachtenberg. Co-composed with Sarah Schachner.
2026	Mortal Kombat II	Simon McQuoid	Warner Bros. Pictures; New Line Cinema; Atomic Monster; Broken Road Productions	Second collaboration with Simon McQuoid

==== As composer of additional music ====
Year	Title	Director(s)	Composer(s)	Studio(s)	Notes
2009	Moon	Duncan Jones	Clint Mansell	Stage 6 Films; Limelight Pictures; Sony Pictures Classics	—N/a
2013	12 Years a Slave	Steve McQueen	Hans Zimmer	Summit Entertainment; Regency Enterprises; Film4 Productions; Fox Searchlight Pictures	—N/a
2015	The Little Prince	Mark Osborne	Hans Zimmer; Richard Harvey	ON Animation Studios; M6 Films; Netflix	—N/a
2016	Batman v Superman: Dawn of Justice	Zack Snyder	Hans Zimmer; Junkie XL	DC Entertainment; RatPac-Dune Entertainment; Cruel and Unusual Films; Warner Bros. Pictures	—N/a
2017	Dunkirk	Christopher Nolan	Hans Zimmer	Syncopy Inc. Warner Bros. Pictures	Composed the "Nimrod" variation, based on the theme by Edward Elgar

=== Television ===
Year	Title	Network(s)	Notes
2009	Breaking the Mould	BBC Four	Television film
2013	The Thirteenth Tale	BBC Two	Television film
2014	The Crimson Field	BBC One	6 episodes
2015	The Enfield Haunting	Sky Witness	3 episodes
2019	Hostile Planet	National Geographic	6 episodes
2025–present	It: Welcome to Derry	HBO	8 episodes

=== Theatre ===
Year	Title	Director(s)	Notes
2009	Peter Pan	Ben Harrison	London / San Francisco
