= Wallfisch =

Wallfisch is a surname. Notable people with the surname include:

- Anita Lasker-Wallfisch (born 1925), British cellist, married to Peter
- Benjamin Wallfisch (born 1979), English composer, conductor, and pianist, son of Raphael
- Elizabeth Wallfisch (born 1952), Australian violinist, married to Raphael
- Ernst Wallfisch (1920–1979), American violist
- Joanna Wallfisch (born 1985), singer-songwriter and jazz singer, daughter of Raphael
- Maya Lasker-Wallfisch (born 1958), psychoanalytic psychotherapist, author, playwright, educator, sister of Raphael
- Paul Wallfisch (born 1962), American musician, son of Ernst
- Peter Wallfisch (1924–1993), British concert pianist
- Raphael Wallfisch (born 1953), English cellist, son of Peter
- Simon Wallfisch (born 1982), British-German classical singer and cellist, son of Raphael
