= Geoffrey Bush discography =

The following is a list of recordings of the music of the English composer Geoffrey Bush. The list includes discs dedicated to works by Bush, and also general compilations which include one or more of Bush's works. The dates of release do not necessarily reflect the dates of the recordings, some of which were made many years earlier.

Label & catalogue	Release year	Album title	Works included	Artistes	Addl refs
Ismeron JMSCD3	1996	Geoffrey Bush Piano Works	Suite: Epigrams; Novelette; Nocturne and Toccata; Sonatina No. 1; Sonatina No. 2; Whydah Variations; Matthew's Tunes; Rudi's Blues; Pieces (4) for piano, Set 2; Suite Champêtre	Eric Parkin (piano)	
Lyrita SRCD252:	1996	Geoffrey Bush Orchestral Works	Yorick Overture; Music for Orchestra; Symphony No. 1; Symphony No. 2 (Guildford)	New Philharmonia Orchestra, Vernon Handley; London Philharmonic Orchestra, Nicholas Braithwaite; London Symphony Orchestra, Barry Wordsworth	
Saydisc CDSDL352	2006	A Christmas Cantata	A Christmas Cantata	Cardiff Polyphonic Choir & Orchestra, Richard Elfyn Jones	
Chandos CHAN8830	1991	A Little Love Music: songs by Geoffrey Bush	Greek Love Songs; The End of Love; Songs of Wonder; A Little Love Music; Three Songs of Ben Jonson	Benjamin Luxon (bar.); Ian Partridge (tenor); Teresa Cahill (sop.); Geoffrey Bush (piano)	
Lyrita SRCD341	2014	Geoffrey Bush: Works for chamber orchestra	Concerto for Light Orchestra; Natus est Immanuel; Locke: Psyche (arr. Bush); Sinfonietta concertante; 2 Miniatures; Finale for a Concert	Raphael Wallfisch (cello); Northern Chamber Orchestra, Nicholas Ward	
Lyrita SRCD343	2014	Geoffrey Bush Songs	Four Songs; Seven Greek Love Songs; Five Spring Songs; Two Stevie Smith Songs; Three Songs of Ben Jonson; The End of Love; Merciless Beauty; Five Medieval Lyrics; O The Month of May	Simon Wallfisch (baritone); Edward Rushton (piano)	
Lyrita REAM1131	2017	Geoffrey Bush	Lord Arthur Savile’s Crime; Trumpet Concerto	Soloists; London Musicians Orchestra, Simon Joly; Patrick Addinall (trumpet); Hamish Milne (piano); BBC Philharmonic, Bryden Thomson	
Priory PRCD6006	2007	Music for an Occasion	Trumpet March	Christopher Dearnley (the grand organ of St. Paul's Cathedral)	
Naxos 8555068	2001	English String Miniatures, Vol. 2	Consort Music	English Northern Philharmonia, David Lloyd-Jones	
Collect CHAN6653	2006	Favourite English Songs	Sigh No More, Ladies from Eight Songs	Felicity Lott (soprano); Graham Johnson (piano)	
Lyrita SRCD2337	2009	Celebrating 50 Years Devoted To British Music - Set 1 (4 CDs)	Yorick Overture	New Philharmonia Orchestra, Vernon Handley	
Two Pianists TP1039077	2011	Shakespeare Inspired	It Was A Lover And His Lass	Michelle Breedt (mezzo-soprano); Nina Schumann (piano)	
Barbirolli Society SJB104546	2011	Evelyn Rothwell 1911-2008	Oboe Concerto	Evelyn Rothwell (oboe); Halle Orchestra, George Weldon	Recorded 27 August 1956.
Priory PRDVD8	2012	The Grand Organ of Salisbury Cathedral	Trumpet March	David Halls (organ)	
OxRecs OXCD130	2015	More Archive Recordings (1960–76)	Magnificat & Nunc dimittis	The Choir of Magdalen College, Bernard Rose	
Atma ACD22701	2015	Love Blows as the Wind Blows	Farewell, Earth's Bliss	Étienne Dupuis (baritone)	
Prima Facie PFCD048	2016	Panorama 1919 - 2013: A Century of British Keyboard Music	Three Dance Variations	Penelope Cave (harpsichord)	
Naxos 8571378	2017	Geoffrey Bush and Joseph Horovitz: Songs	Mirabile Misterium (voice and piano version); 3 Songs of Ben Jonson; Cuisine Provençale; Love for such a cherry lip; Archy at the Zoo; Yesterday	Susanna Fairbairn (soprano); Matthew Schellhorn (piano)	
Lyrita SRCD360	2017	Reizenstein, Bush & Ireland: Sonatas For Violin & Piano	Violin Sonata	Steinberg Duo	
MSR Classics MS1597	2019	Portraits in Music - Music for Oboe, Bassoon and Piano	Trio	Andrew Parker (oboe); Benjamin Coelho (bassoon); Alan Huckleberry (piano)	
Lyrita SRCD407	2022	British Piano Concertos	A Little Concerto on Themes of Thomas Arne	Simon Callaghan (piano); BBC National Orchestra of Wales; Martyn Brabbins	
Signum SIGCD774	2024	Songs for Peter Pears	Songs of the Zodiac	Robin Tritschler (tenor), Philip Higham (cello), Malcolm Martineau (piano), Sean Shibe (guitar)	
SOMM SOMMCD 0727	2026	Quiet Summer	Rhapsody for Clarinet & Strings	Peter Cigleris (clarinet), Chamber Ensemble of London	
