= Lasker (surname) =

Lasker is a surname. Notable people with the surname include:

- Albert Lasker (1880–1952), advertising pioneer; husband of Mary Woodward Lasker
- Andrew Lasker (born 1982), American basketball player
- Anita Lasker-Wallfisch (born 1925), German-British cellist
- Berthold Lasker (1860–1928), German chess master; brother of Emanuel Lasker
- Daniel Lasker (actor), Zimbabwean filmmaker and actor
- Daniel J. Lasker (born 1949), American-born Israeli philosopher
- Eduard Lasker (1829–1884), German politician
- Edward Lasker (1885–1981), leading American chess and Go player
- Edward Lasker (businessman) (1912–1997), American businessman, son of ad executive Albert Lasker
- Else Lasker-Schüler (1869–1945), German poet and playwright
- Emanuel Lasker (1868–1941), German chess player, chess world champion, and mathematician; brother of Berthold Lasker
- Frances Lasker Brody (1916–2009), American arts advocate, collector, and philanthropist
- Gabriel Lasker (1912–2002), American anthropologist
- Greg Lasker (born 1964), American football player
- Jonathan Lasker (born 1948), American artist
- Jordan Lasker, American researcher
- Lawrence Lasker (born 1949), American screenwriter and producer
- Mary Lasker (1900–1994), health activist; wife of Albert Lasker
- Maya Lasker-Wallfisch, psychoanalytic psychotherapist, author, playwright and educator
- Morris E. Lasker (1917–2009), United States federal judge
- Raphael Lasker (1838–1904), German-American rabbi
- Renate Lasker-Harpprecht (1924–2021), German author and journalist
- Reuben Lasker (1929–1988), American fisheries scientist

== See also ==
- Else Lasker-Schüler (1869–1945), German Jewish poet
- Simon Lasker (Pyro), Marvel Comics character
