= Albert Coates (musician) =

English conductor and composer (1882–1953)

Coates, c. 1922

Albert Coates (* 11 ^{jul.}/23 April 1881^{greg.} [deviant: 1882] – 11 December 1953) was an English conductor and composer. Born in Saint Petersburg, where his English father was a successful businessman, he studied in Russia, England and Germany, before beginning his career as a conductor in a series of German opera houses. He was a success in England conducting Wagner at the Royal Opera House, Covent Garden in 1914, and in 1919 was appointed chief conductor of the London Symphony Orchestra.

His strengths as a conductor lay in opera and the Russian repertory, but he was not thought as impressive in the core Austro-German symphonic repertory. After 1923 he failed to secure a permanent conductorship in the UK, and for much of the rest of his life guest-conducted in continental Europe and the US. In his last years he conducted in South Africa, where he died at 71.

As a composer, Coates is little remembered, but he composed seven operas, one of which, Pickwick, was performed at Covent Garden and was the first opera to be televised on the newly launched BBC, in November 1936. He also wrote some concert works for orchestral forces.

== Early years ==
Coates was born in St. Petersburg, Russia, the youngest of seven sons of a Yorkshire father, Charles Thomas Coates, who managed the Russian branch of an English company, and Mary Ann Gibson, who was born and raised in Russia to British parents. He learned the violin, cello and piano as a child in Russia, and was raised in England after turning twelve. After attending the Liverpool Institute High School for Boys and the Royal Naval College, Dartmouth, he studied science at Liverpool University.

Coates returned to Russia to join his father's company, but he also studied composition with Nikolai Rimsky-Korsakov. In 1900, he entered the Leipzig Conservatory, to study the cello with Julius Klengel and the piano with Robert Teichmüller, but was drawn to conducting in Artur Nikisch's conducting classes.

Nikisch appointed Coates répétiteur at the Leipzig opera, and he made his debut as a conductor in 1904 with Offenbach's The Tales of Hoffmann. He was engaged as the conductor of the Elberfeld opera house in 1906, in succession to Fritz Cassirer. From there he progressed to the post of assistant conductor at the Semperoper, Dresden (1907–08), under Ernst von Schuch and Mannheim in 1909 under Artur Bodanzky. He made his London debut in May 1910, conducting the London Symphony Orchestra (LSO) in a programme consisting of a symphony by Maximilian Steinberg, Tchaikovsky's First Piano Concerto and Beethoven's Seventh Symphony. The Times judged him "sound and artistic", though "not particularly inspiring to watch." In the same year, he was invited by Eduard Nápravník to conduct in St. Petersburg's Mariinsky Theatre.

Coates's conducting of Siegfried at the Mariinsky led to his appointment as principal conductor of the Russian Imperial Opera, a post he held for five years, during which he became associated with leading Russian musicians, including Alexander Scriabin, for whose music he became a strong advocate. In July 1910, he married Ella Lizzie Holland.

== International career ==
Coates first appeared at Covent Garden in 1914 in a Wagner season. He won critical praise for his performance of Tristan und Isolde and particularly for his conducting of Die Meistersinger. His conducting of Puccini's Manon Lescaut later in the same season was also well received, his Parsifal less so.

The Russian Revolution in 1917 did not at first adversely affect Coates. The Soviet government appointed him "President of all Opera Houses in Soviet Russia", based in Moscow. By 1919, however, living conditions in Russia had become desperate. Coates became seriously ill, and with considerable difficulty left Russia with his family by way of Finland in April 1919. After his arrival in England, he was appointed chief conductor of the LSO. Reviewing his first performance in the post, The Times praised him warmly, along with the younger Adrian Boult and Geoffrey Toye, in an article on "The Conductor's Art". In September 1919, he was appointed to teach a new class for operatic training at the Royal College of Music. Reporting the appointment, The Times wrote, "There can scarcely be a musician in this country with so wide and cosmopolitan an experience of operatic performance."

The following month, there occurred an incident for which Coates is remembered in many books and articles. The LSO gave the world premiere of Elgar's Cello Concerto under the baton of the composer, but Coates, who was conducting the rest of the programme, appropriated most of Elgar's allotted rehearsal time. (Note: Lady Elgar wrote, "that brutal selfish ill-mannered bounder ... that brute Coates went on rehearsing.") As a result, the orchestra gave a notoriously inadequate performance. Elgar did not complain publicly, but the musical world knew privately of Coates's behaviour. (Note: The critic of The Observer, Ernest Newman, wrote, "There have been rumours about during the week of inadequate rehearsal. Whatever the explanation, the sad fact remains that never, in all probability, has so great an orchestra made so lamentable an exhibition of itself." Elgar did not bear a grudge, and attended a concert the following year at which Coates accompanied Jascha Heifetz in the Elgar Violin Concerto.) With this exception, Coates served English composers well in the post-war years, giving the first performances of large-scale works including Vaughan Williams's revised A London Symphony (1920), Delius's Requiem (1922), Bax's First Symphony (1922), and Holst's Choral Symphony (1925). He conducted many other early performances of music by contemporary English composers, including the second complete performance of Holst's The Planets in 1920, two years after its premiere. (Note: This was the first time the general public was able to hear the complete work, the first performance, under Boult, having been given before an invited audience at the Queen's Hall.) Among works from continental Europe introduced to England by Coates were Prokofiev's Third Piano Concerto and Rachmaninoff's Fourth Piano Concerto, each with its composer as soloist. In January 1926, he gave the first stage performance outside Russia of Rimsky-Korsakov's opera The Invisible City of Kitezh, at the Gran Teatre del Liceu in Barcelona.

After his contract with the LSO expired in 1922, Coates held no more permanent conductorships in the UK, although he directed the Leeds music festivals of 1922 and 1925. In 1923, he was appointed joint principal conductor with Eugene Goossens of the Rochester Philharmonic Orchestra in the US. He was among the co-founders of Vladimir Rosing's pioneering American Opera Company. Coates left Rochester in 1925 as a result of a disagreement with the orchestra's sponsor, George Eastman, over artistic policy. The reason for his failure to secure a permanent position in the UK was, according to one commentator, that although he was a fine conductor of opera and of Russian concert music, "his interpretations of the Viennese classics were less acceptable" and as the latter were more important in British musical life, "Coates failed to win for himself the highest reputation among his own countrymen."

== Later years ==
In 1925, Coates was invited to Paris to conduct at the Opéra. He continued to make regular guest appearances in many of the world's artistic centres until 1939. He conducted opera in Italy (1927 to 1929) and Germany (Berlin State Opera, 1931), and concerts with the Vienna Philharmonic Orchestra (1935) and in the Netherlands, Sweden and the USSR, which he visited three times.

On 13 November 1936 the BBC broadcast the world's first televised opera: scenes from Coates's Pickwick, directed by Rosing, were shown in advance of the work's premiere. Coates and Rosing launched a season of the British Music Drama Opera Company at Covent Garden the following week. In 1938 he conducted George Lloyd's opera 'The Serf' at Covent Garden with The New English Opera Company, directed by Rosing.

When World War II broke out, Coates moved to the US. There, together with Rosing, he founded the Southern California Opera Association. Productions included Coates's opera Gainsborough's Duchess. He guest conducted the Los Angeles Philharmonic and worked briefly in Hollywood, making cameo appearances in two 1944 MGM films, Two Girls and a Sailor and Song of Russia.

In 1946, Coates moved to South Africa, accepting the conductorships of the Johannesburg Symphony Orchestra and, later, the Cape Town Municipal Orchestra. He settled in Milnerton, Cape Town, with his second wife Vera Joanna Nettlefold (a soprano professionally known as Vera de Villiers), and died there in 1953. The Oxford Dictionary of National Biography says of him "Although he was important to the fortunes of the London Symphony Orchestra immediately after the First World War, his contribution to British musical life was ephemeral. As a composer he has lost his place in the repertory, and as an executant he is remembered generally by collectors with an interest in historic recordings."

== Compositions ==
In its obituary of Coates, The Times wrote that his compositions "fell between the two stools of national character and international sympathy, with a resulting ambiguity of achievement." The Grove Dictionary of Music and Musicians describes them as "technically proficient rather than imaginative". His works include the operas Samuel Pepys and Pickwick; the former was given in German in Munich in 1929, and the latter in English at Covent Garden in 1936. His five other operas included The Myth Beautiful (1920). His concert works included a piano concerto and a symphonic poem The Eagle, dedicated to the memory of his former teacher Nikisch, which was performed in Leeds in 1925. At a memorial concert held at the Wigmore Hall on 1 July 1959 the Piano Concerto was performed by the Anglo-French pianist Frank Laffitte with a section of the London Symphony Orchestra. The Guardian critic described it as "an endless patchwork of remnants from all the music that Coates ever conducted."

== Recordings ==
Coates made early contributions to the representation of orchestral music on record, beginning in 1920 with Scriabin's The Poem of Ecstasy and afterwards conducting many excerpts from Wagner's Der Ring des Nibelungen and (in 1923 and 1926) two complete recordings of Beethoven's Ninth Symphony. He conducted the 1929 first recording of Bach's Mass in B minor, BWV 232, and the 1930 premiere recording of Rachmaninoff's Piano Concerto No. 3 in D minor, with Vladimir Horowitz as soloist. Restored recordings of works by Scriabin, Stravinsky, Prokofiev, Holst and others, dating from 1920 to 1932, were issued by Pristine Audio in 2026.

== Personal life ==
Albert Coates was married twice. In 1910 he married Ella Holland, with whom he had one daughter, Tamara Sydonie Coates, who became a professional oboist. Coates' grandchildren include violinist Elizabeth Wallfisch and doublebass player Paul Miller. His great-grandchildren include composer Benjamin Wallfisch, cellist and baritone Simon Wallfisch and singer-songwriter Joanna Wallfisch. Later in life, Coates married South African mezzo-soprano Vera de Villiers, née Johanna Veronique Waterston Graaf. He also had an affair with Angel Records founder Dorle Soria, uncovered after Soria's death.

== Notes and references ==
Notes

== Sources ==
- Kennedy, Michael (1987). Adrian Boult. London: Hamish Hamilton. ISBN 0-333-48752-4.
- Moore, Jerrold Northrop (1990). Edward Elgar – Letters of a Lifetime. Oxford: Clarendon Press. ISBN 0193154722.
