= Laskier =

Laskier is a surname. Notable people with the surname include:

- Rutka Laskier (1929–1943), Jewish teenager from Poland who wrote a Holocaust diary
- Frank Laskier (1912–1948), British seaman famous during World War II

== See also ==
- Lasker (surname)
