= Kenneth Leighton =

British composer and pianist

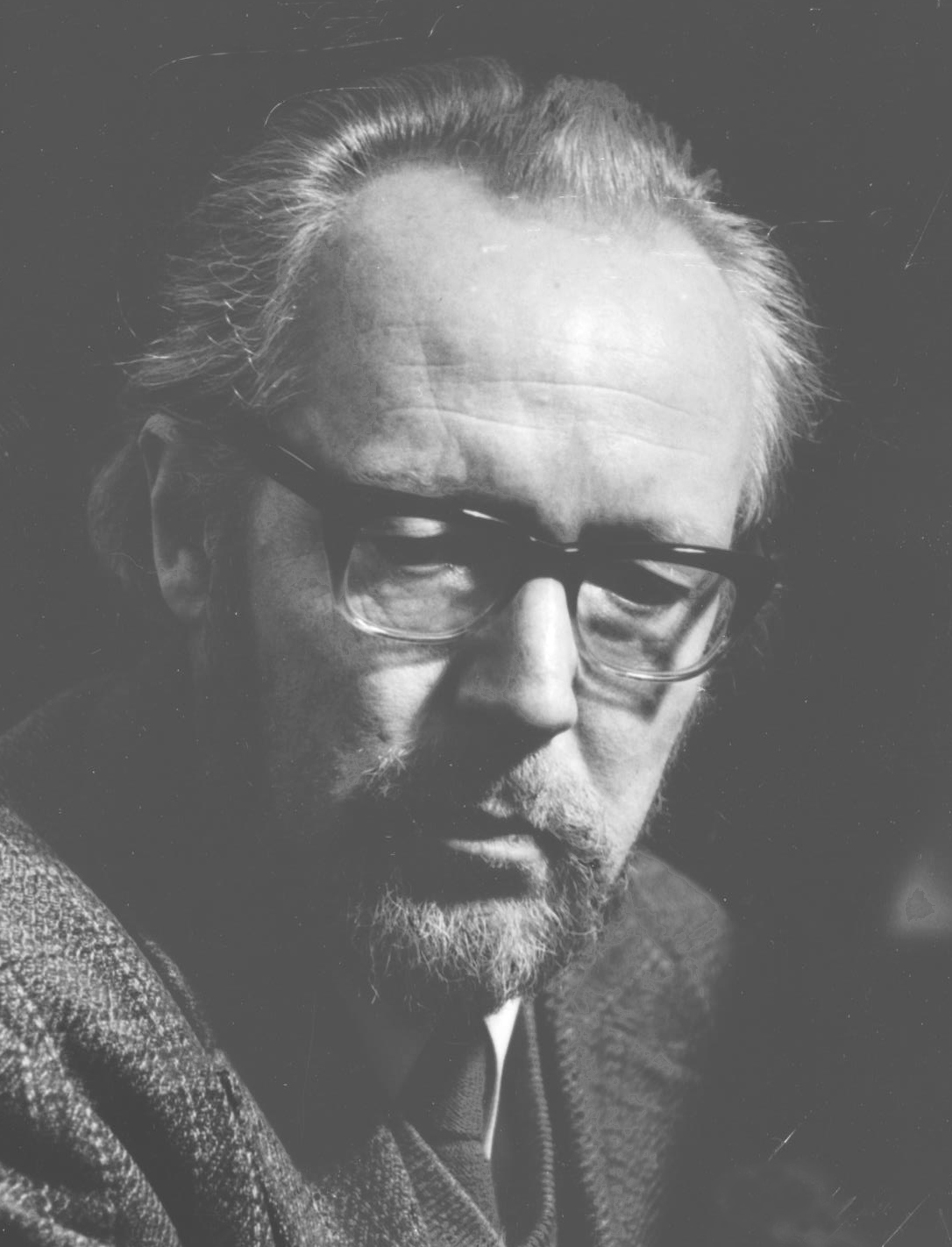
- Leighton in 1981
- Born: 2 October 1929; Wakefield, Yorkshire
- Died: 24 August 1988 (aged 58); Edinburgh, Scotland
- Website: Kenneth Leighton

Kenneth Leighton (2 October 1929 – 24 August 1988) was a British composer and pianist. His compositions include church and choral music, pieces for piano, organ, cello, oboe and other instruments, chamber music, concertos, symphonies, and an opera. He held academic appointments in the Universities of Leeds, Oxford and Edinburgh.

== Biography ==
Leighton was born in Wakefield, Yorkshire, on 2 October 1929, to parents of modest means, who noted his musical ability as a child and enrolled him as a chorister at Wakefield Cathedral. Encouraged by his mother and cathedral staff (who helped obtain a piano) he began to play the piano at primary school and progressed precociously. In 1940, he gained a place at the Queen Elizabeth Grammar School, played at school assemblies and concerts, and composed settings of poetry for voice and piano and solo piano pieces (including the Sonatina Op. 1a, 1946, his first published work). While still at school (in 1946) he obtained the Licentiate of the Royal Academy of Music (LRAM) in piano performance, aged 16. With the benefit of a State scholarship to study classics at University, Leighton was admitted to the Queen's College, Oxford in 1947, where he also won a Hastings Scholarship, obtaining a BA in classics in 1950. After commencing his Classics degree he began to study simultaneously for a degree in music, tutored by the composer Bernard Rose, and gained the Oxford Bachelor of Music in 1951. At Oxford he came to the attention of Gerald Finzi, an early supporter and friend, who performed some of his works (e.g. Symphony for Strings, Op. 3, 1949) with the Newbury String Players and introduced him to Vaughan Williams, who facilitated and attended some of his performances in London. Leopold Stokowski premiered his overture Primavera Romana (Op. 14) with the Royal Philharmonic in Liverpool in 1951. In the same year he was awarded a Mendelssohn Scholarship, which enabled him to study with Goffredo Petrassi in Rome, where he met his first wife, Lydia Angela Vignapiano, by whom he had two children (Angela Leighton, academic and poet; Robert, archaeologist at Edinburgh University).

After his return from Italy in 1951, Leighton taught briefly at the Royal Marines School of Music in Deal, where one of his pupils was Brian Blyth Daubney. He held a Gregory Fellowship in music from 1953 to 1956 in the University of Leeds and in 1956 was appointed Lecturer, then Reader, in Music in the University of Edinburgh. In 1968, he moved to Oxford University, where he succeeded Edmund Rubbra as Fellow in Music in Worcester College. Leighton returned to Edinburgh as Reid Professor of Music in 1970, holding the chair until his death in 1988. He married Josephine Anne Prescott in 1981.

Unlike most of his Oxford contemporaries, Leighton came from a working-class area of an industrial northern town; so his early rise to prominence is all the more remarkable. Although he spent much of his adult life in Scotland, he always regarded himself as a down-to-earth Yorkshireman. He eschewed the possibility of a career as a pianist, hoping that a university position would allow him greater creative freedom and time to compose, although he periodically gave recitals and broadcasts, and frequently conducted the university (Reid) orchestra. After the spell in Italy, his life was dominated by composing, which continued uninterrupted, notwithstanding an unsettled period in the late 1970s and early 1980s associated with divorce and remarriage. Leighton was a rather private man, averse to self-promotion and slightly shy of social occasions, who treasured peace and quiet, although he enjoyed family life and teaching (notably harmony and counterpoint). For most of his career he managed to reconcile university commitments with composing, but found this increasingly difficult in later years and was intending to retire early to have more time for composition. Indeed, Leighton never felt entirely at home or at ease with the title of 'university professor' and became disenchanted with the burden of administrative duties at Edinburgh. At Leeds he formed friendships with the poet Geoffrey Hill and the painters Terry Frost and Maurice de Sausmarez. A lasting friendship with the Wallfisch family (musicians Peter, Raphael and Anita Lasker-Wallfisch) also dates from this period. Amongst his distinguished students at Oxford and Edinburgh were Donald Runnicles, Nicholas Cleobury, and Nigel Osborne, who succeeded him as Reid professor at Edinburgh. James MacMillan also studied at Edinburgh during Leighton's tenure and described him as "a marvellous teacher". While Leighton wrote a good deal of church music, and has occasionally been categorised too reductively as a church-music composer, he was not a church-goer or member of any congregation, nor even conventionally religious. His interests in literature and love of nature and countryside are reflected in the settings of English poetry in many works, such as Laudes Animantium (Op. 61), Symphonies 2 and 3 (Opp. 69 & 90) and Earth, Sweet Earth (Op. 94). Fond of walking his dog on the hills, Leighton loved the Scottish highlands and frequently visited the western islands (in the 1960s often in an old camper van). Trips to Mull and Iona in the early 1970s foreshadow the opera Columba (Op. 77, 1978). He also had friends on the island of Arran, which he visited regularly. He died at home in Edinburgh in 1988, six months after being diagnosed with oesophageal cancer.

== Music ==
Leighton's earliest youthful works, characteristic of his Oxford years and well exemplified by Veris Gratia (Op. 9, 1950), were influenced in part by the English tradition as represented by Vaughan Williams, Finzi, Herbert Howells, and Walton. His own more distinctive style, however, emerged and consolidated rapidly between 1950 and 1955, and probably owes as much to the period of study with Petrassi in Italy and familiarity with the work of a wide range of 20th-century European composers. He maintained a lifelong passion for the music of Bach (cf. his award-winning Fantasia Contrappuntistica Op. 24, 1956). A few pieces reflect experimentation or flirtation with serialism, although Leighton's works are more generally typified by a strong sense of lyricism, diatonicism, contrapuntal mastery, chromaticism and rhythmic invention.

He composed a wide range of music (over 100 works, 96 with opus numbers, below) for many different configurations of instruments, often for commissions, specific occasions and performers. His output includes church music, chamber, organ and solo piano music, as well as large-scale orchestral works and an opera (Op. 77, 1978) based on the life of Columba (libretto by the poet Edwin Morgan). The sacred and liturgical music is widely known and performed regularly across the UK (and extensively recorded, e.g. on Chandos, Hyperion, Naxos, ASV, Priory labels). Leighton did much to keep alive and transform the Victorian tradition of English choral music, purge its piety and drag it into the (late) twentieth century. An enduringly popular early piece is Lully, Lulla, Thou Little Tiny Child, Op. 25b, a setting of the Coventry Carol, while the hymn Drop, drop, slow tears (concluding Crucifixus pro nobis, Op. 38, 1961) has also appeared in numerous recordings. The boundaries between sacred, choral and secular music, however, are often blurred in Leighton's oeuvre, which makes extensive use of vocals. Hymns and chorales feature prominently in the instrumental music as well. A good example is 'The Shining River', which is at the core of the Fantasy on an American Hymn Tune (Op. 70, for clarinet, cello and piano), and also permeates the Second Symphony (Op. 69, below), juxtaposed with the Last Sermon of John Donne in the finale.

The solo piano music, which ranges from miniatures for younger players to demandingly advanced works, has been recorded by several artists (e.g. Eric Parkin, Peter Wallfisch, Margaret Fingerhut, Angela Brownridge, Stephen Hough), as also the works for organ, which include the celebratory Paean (1966), the monumental duet Martyrs (Op. 73), the Prelude, Scherzo and Passacaglia (Op. 41), Missa de Gloria (Op. 82) and an organ concerto with timpani (Op. 58, cf. Poulenc), widely credited with injecting new life and vigour into the British organ repertoire of the late 20th century. The works for cello (the lyrical Elegy (Op. 5) written while he was a student) appear on various recordings, notably by Raphael Wallfisch; the cello concerto was premiered by Florence Hooton and Sir John Barbirolli in 1956.

Chamber works include the prize-winning Piano Trio (Op. 46), three string quartets, piano quintet and quartet, and the Fantasy Octet (Op. 87), incorporating themes by Percy Grainger, commissioned for the 1982 Edinburgh Festival Grainger centenary concert. In recent years the larger-scale works have also become better known thanks to new recordings. Amongst these is the second symphony (Sinfonia mistica, Op. 69, 1974), a meditation on death in memory of his mother (CHAN10495). Albeit a profoundly spiritual work, this does not lack theatrical flair, including two scherzos, with jazzy touches (taken as menacing by one reviewer), suggesting a composer with a sly sense of humour. The last piano pieces include three major works. They mark the culmination of a lifetime of writing for the instrument: a Sonata for Four Hands (Op. 92, 1984/5) with jazzy rhythms and a haunting chorale; a Prelude, Hymn and Toccata (Op. 96, 1987) for two pianos, with a central Hymn (Abide with Me, heavily disguised), and final Toccata; and the revelatory Four Romantic Pieces (Op. 95, 1986), described by one reviewer as some of the most powerful and imaginative piano music of the late 20th century.

Most of Leighton's works have been recorded and are commercially available, although several notable exceptions remain. Much of his output is published by Novello and Co.

== Works ==
=== Works with opus numbers ===
- 1a Sonatina No. 1 (piano) (1946)
- 1b Sonatina No. 2 (piano) (1948)
- 2 Sonata No. 1 (piano) (1948)
- 3 Symphony for Strings (1948–9)
- 4 Violin Sonata No. 1 (& flute/piano vers) (1948)
- 5 Elegy (cello; & orch vers) (1949/1953)
- 6 Veris Gratia, Cantata (1950)
- 7 Scherzo (2 pianos)
- 8 Hippolytus (Cantata)
- 9 Veris Gratia, Suite (oboe/cello/strings) (1950)
- 10 Just Now the Lilac is in Bloom (Cantata Baritone/String Orch)
- 11a Napoli, Rhapsody on Neapolitan themes (piano/orch)
- 11 Piano Concerto No. 1 (1951)
- 12 Violin Concerto (1952)
- 14 Primavera Romana (orch) (1951)
- 15 Concerto for Viola, Harp, Timpani & String Orch (1952)
- 16 The Light Invisible (chor/orch) (1958)
- 17 Sonata No. 2 (piano) (1953)
- 18 Passacaglia, Chorale and Fugue (orch) (1957)
- 19 Burlesque (orch) (1957)
- 19a Serenade (flute/piano) (1949/53)
- 20 Violin Sonata No. 2 (1953)
- 21 A Christmas Carol (orch & org vers) (1953)
- 22 Five Studies (piano) (1952)
- 23 Concerto for Oboe & String Orchestra (1953)
- 24 Fantasia Contrappuntistica (piano) (1956)
- 25 Three Carols (inc. Lully Lulla) (1948/1956)
- 26 Concerto for Two Pianos, Timpani, Orchestra
- 27 Piano Sonata No. 3 (1954)
- 28 The Birds (chor) (1954)
- 29 Fantasia on the name Bach (viola/piano) (1955)
- 30 Variations (piano) (1955)
- 31 Cello Concerto (orch; & cello/piano vers); (1956)
- 32 String Quartet No. 1 (1956)
- 33 String Quartet No. 2 (1957)
- 34 Piano Quintet (1959)
- 35 Partita for cello/piano (1959)
- 36 Nine Variations for piano (1959)
- 37 Piano Concerto No. 2 (1960)
- 38 Crucifixus Pro Nobis (choir/org) (1961)
- 39 Concerto for String Orchestra (1960–1)
- 40 Missa Sancti Thomae (choir/org) (1962)
- 41 Prelude, Scherzo and Passacaglia (org) (1963)
- 42 Symphony No. 1 (1964)
- 43 Seven Variations (string quartet) (1964)
- 44 Mass (Double Choir) (1964)
- 45 Communion Service in D
- 46 Piano Trio (1965)
- 47 Pieces for Angela (piano) (1966)
- 48 Metamorphoses (violin & piano) (1966)
- 49 Et Resurrexit (org) (1966)
- 50 Missa Brevis (1967)
- 51 Conflicts: Fantasy on Two Themes (piano) (1967)
- 52 Sonata for Solo Cello (1967)
- 53 Dance Suite No. 1 (orchestra) (1968)
- 54 Three Psalms (1968)
- 55 Easter Sequence (chor/org) (1969)
- 56 Six Study–Variations (piano) (1969)
- 57 Piano Concerto No. 3 (1969)
- 58 Organ Concerto (org/str orch) (1970)
- 59 Dance Suite No. 2 (orch) (1970)
- 60 Dance Overture (orch) (1971)
- 61 Laudes Animantium (chor)
- 62 Magnificat and Nunc Dimittis (Second Service) (1972)
- 63 Piano Quartet (Contrasts and Variants) (1972)
- 64 Piano Sonata (1972)
- 65 Six Elizabethan Lyrics (women's choir) (1972)
- 66 Sarum Mass (1972)
- 67 Mass for Ampleforth
- 68 Laudate Pueri (choir) (1973)
- 69 Symphony No. 2, "Sinfonia mistica" (1974)
- 70 Fantasy on an American Hymn Tune (clarinet/cello/piano) (1974)
- 71 Laudes Montium (chor) (1975)
- 72 Six Fantasies on Hymn Tunes (org) (1975)
- 73 Martyrs, Dialogues on a Scottish Psalm Tune (organ 4-hands) (1976)
- 74 Hymn to Matter (chor/orch)
- 75 Sequence for All Saints (chor) (1978)
- 76 Improvisations, De profundis (harpsic) (1977)
- 77 Columba (opera) (1980)
- 78 Columba mea, Song of Songs (voc/orch) (1977)
- 79 Awake my Glory (voc/chor/org) (1979)
- 80 Fantasy on a Chorale ("Es ist genug") (violin/org) (1979)
- 81 Missa Cornelia (chor/org) (1979)
- 82 Missa de Gloria (org) (1980)
- 83 Animal Heaven (chor/orch) (1980)
- 84 These are thy wonders (voc/org) (1981)
- 85 Alleluia Pascha Nostrum (cello/piano) (1981)
- 86 Household Pets (piano) (1981)
- 87 Fantasy-Octet (Strings) (1982)
- 88 Concerto for Harpsichord, Recorder (or flute) and String Orchestra (1982)
- 89 Dance Suite No. 3: Scottish Dances (orch) (1983)
- 90 Symphony No. 3, "Laudes Musicae" (1984)
- 91 The World's Desire (chor) (1984)
- 92 Sonata for Piano Duet (1985)
- 93 Veni Redemptor (org) (1985)
- 94 Earth, Sweet Earth (voc/piano) (1986)
- 95 Four Romantic Pieces (piano) (1986)
- 96 Prelude, Hymn and Toccata (2 pianos) (1987)

=== Works without opus numbers ===
- Winter Scenes (piano) (1953)
- Serenade (3 recorders) (1955)
- God's Grandeur (choir) (1957)
- Jack-in-the-Box (piano) (1959)
- Nocturne (violin/piano) (1959)
- Hymn of the Nativity (choir) (1960)
- Alleluia Amen (choir) (1961)
- Festive Overture (orch) (1962)
- Give Me the Wings of Faith (choir) (1962)
- O Leave Your Sheep (choir/org) (1962)
- Preces and Responses (choir) (1964)
- Te Deum Laudamus (choir/orch) (1964)
- Wassail All Over Town! (choir) (1964)
- Elegy (organ) (1965)
- Lazy Bones (piano) (1965)
- Let All the World in Every Corner Sing (choir/org) (1965)
- Study (piano) (1965)
- Fanfare (org) (1966)
- Lift Up Your Heads, O Ye Gates (choir) (1966)
- Paean (organ) (1966)
- Morning Canticles (choir) (1967)
- Quam Dilecta! (choir) (1967)
- Festival Fanfare (organ) (1968)
- Improvisation (organ) (1969)
- Adventate Deo (choir/org) (1970)
- Lament (guitar) (1974)
- Rockingham (organ) (1975)
- Ode (organ) (1977)
- An Evening Hymn (choir) (1979)
- Fanfare on Newtoun (choir/brass/org) (1983)
- The Christ-Child Lay (choir) (1984)
- What Love of this is Thine? (choir) (1985)
- Missa Sancti Petri (choir/org) (1987)
- Veni Creator Spiritus (organ) (1987)
- The Beauty of Holiness (choir/org) (1988)
- Missa Christi (choir/org) (1988)
- Preludes (piano) (1988)

== Awards ==
- 1951 – Mendelssohn Scholarship
- 1951 – Royal Philharmonic Society Prize
- 1956 – Busoni Prize for composition (Fantasia Contrappuntistica op.24)
- 1960 – National Federation of Music Societies Prize for The Birds op.28
- 1960 – Doctorate of Music (DMus), University of Oxford
- 1965 – City of Trieste First Prize for a new symphonic work (Symphony no.1, op.42)
- 1966 – Bernhard Sprengel Prize for chamber music (Piano trio op.46)
- 1967 – Cobbett Medal for distinguished services to chamber music
- 1977 – Honorary doctorate, University of St Andrews
- 1982 – Honorary Fellow of the Royal College of Music

== Sources ==
- Smith, Carolyn J (2004). Kenneth Leighton: a bio-bibliography. Praeger Publishers (Greenwood Publishing Group). ISBN 0-313-30515-3.
