= Franz Fehrenbach =

German engineer and manager

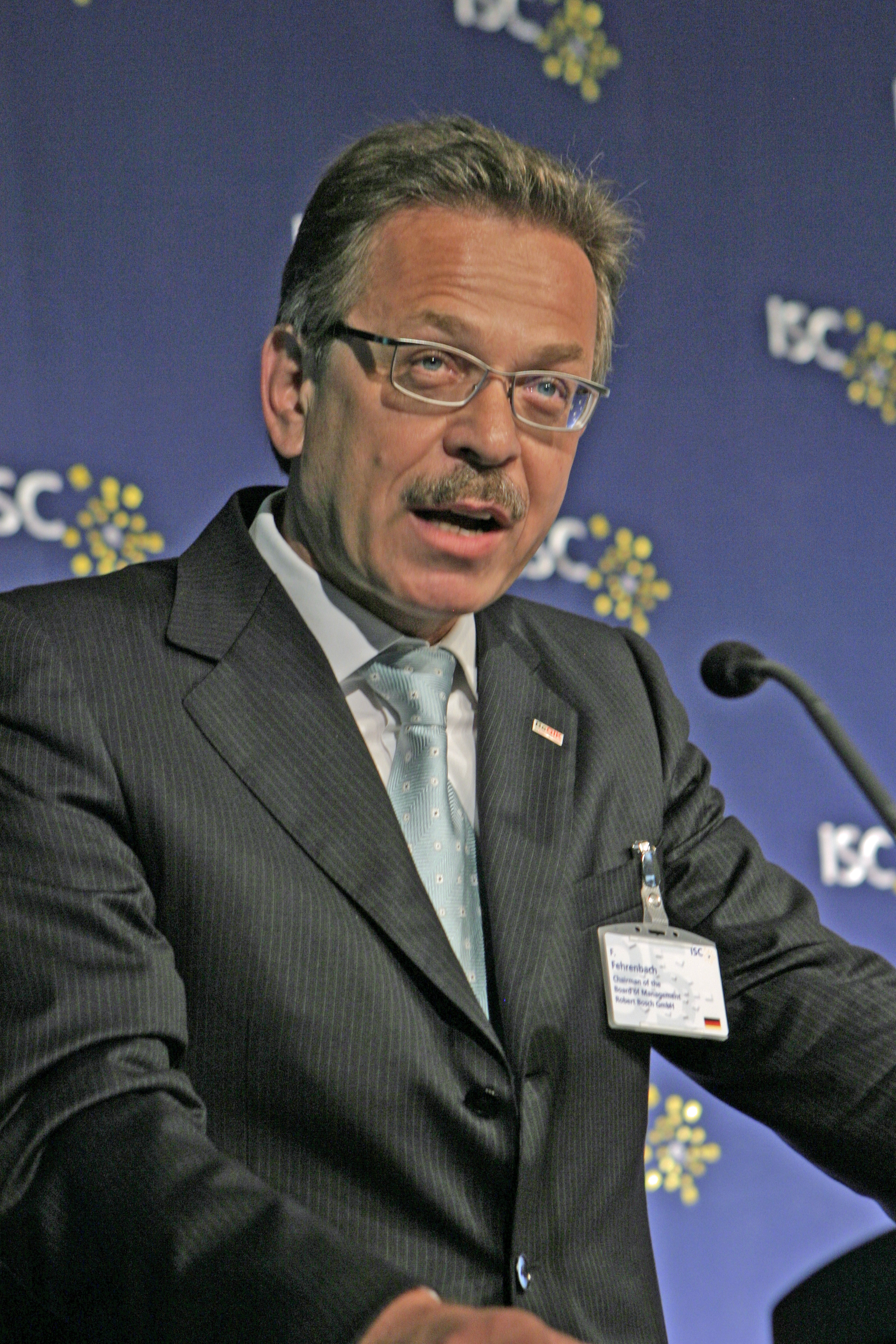
- Fehrenbach in 2005
- Born: Franz Fehrenbach; 1 July 1949 (age 77); Kenzingen, Baden-Württemberg, West Germany
- Education: Karlsruhe Institute of Technology
- Occupations: Chairman, Robert Bosch GmbH
- Children: 3

Franz Fehrenbach (born 1 July 1949) is a German engineer and manager who was the chairman of Robert Bosch GmbH.

== Career ==
Fehrenbach studied industrial engineering and management at the University of Karlsruhe and joined Robert Bosch GmbH in 1975. In 1988, he was transferred to the United States, but he returned to Germany in 1989. In 1990, Fehrenbach became Vice-CEO of the corporation. In 2003, he then became chairman of Robert Bosch GmbH, succeeding Hermann Scholl.

In 2012, Fehrenbach caused a stir by expressing his political view to expel Greece not only out of the Euro zone but also out of the European Union.

== Other activities ==
=== Corporate boards ===
- Temasek Holdings, Member of the European Advisory Panel (since 2016)
- Linde, Deputy Chairman of the supervisory board (since 2013)
- Stihl, Member of the supervisory board (2012–2023)
- BASF, Member of the supervisory board (2008–2022)

=== Non-profit organizations ===
- Allensbach Institute, Member of the Board of Trustees
- Baden-Badener Unternehmer-Gespräche (BBUG), Member of the Board of Trustees
- European School of Management and Technology (ESMT), Member of the Board of Trustees
- German Institute for International and Security Affairs (SWP), Member of the Council
- Stifterverband für die Deutsche Wissenschaft, Member of the Board
- Trilateral Commission, Member of the European Group

== Recognition ==
- 2009 – Prize for Understanding and Tolerance, awarded by the Jewish Museum Berlin
