= Maya Lasker-Wallfisch =

Psychotherapist and author

Maya Lasker-Wallfisch (born 1958 in London) is a psychoanalytic psychotherapist, author, playwright and educator, specialising in transgenerational trauma.

== Biography ==
Maya Jacobs Lasker-Wallfisch was born as Marianne Lasker-Wallfisch in London into a family of musicians. Her parents, pianist Peter Wallfisch and cellist Anita Lasker-Wallfisch OBE, were both originally from Breslau and had emigrated to Great Britain after the Second World War. Her mother is of Jewish-German descent and had survived the Holocaust as a cellist in the girls' orchestra at the Auschwitz concentration camp. After arriving in England, Anita became a co-founder of the English Chamber Orchestra.

Maya Lasker-Wallfisch was married to David Jacobs, the son of London's Rabbi Louis Jacobs, with whom she has a son, Abraham-Peter.

Lasker-Wallfisch's older brother is the cellist Raphael Wallfisch. Her nephews are film composer and Academy member Benjamin and baritone Simon Wallfisch.

== Career ==
After initially working with children at the Tavistock Centre in London, Lasker-Wallfisch trained as an addiction specialist and later became a psychoanalytic psychotherapist for adults, couples, and families. Her focus is on the treatment of transgenerational trauma.

She lectures on the psychological and political consequences of the Nazi dictatorship. She has published scientific articles. She was a speaker at the 2017 international conference on transgenerational trauma in Amman, Jordan, and at the Celebrate Life festival near Oldenburg, Germany. Together with her mother Anita, Lasker-Wallfisch campaigns at numerous memorial events against anti-Semitism and in favor of a living culture of remembrance.

== Author ==
In 2020, German publishing house Suhrkamp Verlag published Lasker-Wallfisch's memoir, titled Letter to Breslau. In this work, Lasker-Wallfisch explores her family's history and the transgenerational transmission of trauma. In an interview with The Jewish Chronicle, she describes her motivation as follows: "I longed to have three generations of Laskers in the same place, because my grandparents could never be in a room together with us. Now they have a home in my book. Though there is no cemetery to visit, I hope I’ve given them back, the Laskers of Breslau, a place to be."

Lasker-Wallfisch's biography was well received by German reviewers, with Marta Kijowska in Frankfurter Allgemeine Zeitung calling it "an impressive book. It contains an unusually open and comprehensible description of a transgenerational trauma that is still rarely addressed." Die Welt's Manuel Brug points out "with 'Letter to Breslau' Maya Lasker-Wallfisch has written a gripping family history – as well as a modern theory of memory." Deutschlandfunk’s Peter Sawicki calls it a "... touching book. Maya Lasker-Wallfisch writes with empathy and succeeds in portraying a sensitive topic in a lively manner." German public broadcasting radio station Deutschlandfunk Kultur remarks "The author finds a clear and touching language to break out of the devastating silence. To tell her grandparents everything that she did not hear from her mother for so many decades." Alexandra Senfft (Der Freitag) calls it a powerful book that has "greatly enriched the understanding of transgenerational transmission, the perspective on multiple generations in historical contexts. It reminds us of the dangerous psychological and political legacies of the Nazi dictatorship and proves that the destructive spell of the past can be broken." In April 2021 Lasker-Wallfisch's biography was chosen 'Book of the Month' by 'Haus der Heimat des Landes Baden-Württemberg' (education and research center of the Ministry of Interior of Baden-Württemberg).

On the topic of her family history Lasker-Wallfisch also curated an original stage performance, The Laskers From Breslau, which she produced from the archive of family correspondence as a stage performance with live musical performances by composers such as Ernst Bloch, Max Bruch, and Maurice Ravel. This was presented at the Jewish Museum Berlin and later in Hamburg by invitation of the Shoah Foundation UCLA. In July 2020 she was invited to a talk about her book by Munich Documentation Centre for the History of National Socialism.

Lasker-Wallfisch lives and works in London and Berlin. In 2020 she received German citizenship.

The German translation of her second book, Ich schreib euch aus Berlin (I write to you from Berlin), was published by Suhrkamp/Insel in October 2022.

Together with the director Daniela Völker, Lasker-Wallfisch created the documentary "The Commandant's Shadow" which premiered in May / June 2024. Also, she has completed her first stage play, for which she received international interest. It is scheduled to premiere in New York in June 2026.

She is currently working on her second play and third book, the final volume of her trilogy, with the working title life After, slated for publication in 2026.

In 2025 she was a recipient of the Mench Award for her contributions to Holocaust education.
