= Eric Parkin =

English pianist (1924–2020)

Eric Parkin (24 March 1924 – 3 February 2020) was an English pianist.

Parkin was born in Stevenage and attended Alleyne's Grammar School there. He studied at Trinity College of Music with the Anglo-French pianist Frank Laffitte and with George Oldroyd. He also studied conducting with Charles Kennedy Scott and composition with Henry Geehl. He began working in the 1940s as a cocktail pianist at The May Fair Hotel, making his classical debut at the Wigmore Hall in 1948 with a recital of Beethoven and Chopin.

Parkin quickly became a frequent broadcaster on BBC Radio. Having met the composer John Ireland he made his Proms debut playing Ireland's Piano Concerto in 1953, with Malcolm Sargent and the BBC Symphony Orchestra. Parkin was also the first to record Ireland's Piano Sonata, under the supervision of the composer.

Although his musical interests spanned the Classical and Romantic periods, he became best known for his recorded performances and recitals of 20th-century British music, including works by William Baines, Arnold Bax, William Blezard, Frank Bridge, Alan Bush, Geoffrey Bush, Peter Dickinson, David Gow, Kenneth Leighton, Billy Mayerl, E J Moeran and Richard Stoker. Later in life he increasingly recorded French and American repertoire, including Poulenc, Roussel, Barber and Copland. He recorded more than 80 albums over his career from the early 1950s onwards, for Argo, Lyrita, Chandos, Priory and Unicorn.

Parkin was a professor at Trinity College from 1945 to 1958 and from 1964 to 1967. He then taught piano at Bulmershe College in Reading, Berkshire (later merged with Reading University). He lived with his partner Rees Morgans for 57 years at Greengates Cottage in Watlington, Oxon. Parkin died on 3 February 2020, aged 95.
