= Piano Sonata (Ireland) =

The Piano Sonata by John Ireland was composed between October 1918 and January 1920, and published by Augener in 1920. Ireland revised the work (performance directions only) in 1951. The manuscript is in the British Library.

Its first London performance was given by Frederic Lamond on 12 June 1920 at the Wigmore Hall, though he may have also performed it in Bournemouth a week earlier. These were the only occasions he ever played it. However, within two years there had been many other performances, by Winifred Christie, Evlin Howard-Jones, Ralph Lawton, Edward Mitchell and Lloyd Powell.

There are three movements:

- Allegro moderato in E minor, sonata form
- Non troppo lento in B flat major, in ternary form
- Con moto moderato, in E major, a rondo.

In the first movement Lisa Hardy identifies the French impressionist influences, the frequent changes of metre with many phases continuing over the barlines, and Ireland's characteristic harmonic language, with octaves and triads often filled in with added notes, most often seconds and sixths. The middle movement is expansive and elegiac, perhaps a response to World War 1, which had affected the composer deeply. The final rondo, the most demanding to perform, has "a heroic and triumphal march-like character".

Ralph Hill considered the Sonata to be "one of the finest and most important since Liszt's in B minor". The first recording was made by Eric Parkin in 1953, under the supervision of the composer.
