= Renate Lasker-Harpprecht =

German journalist and author (1924–2021)

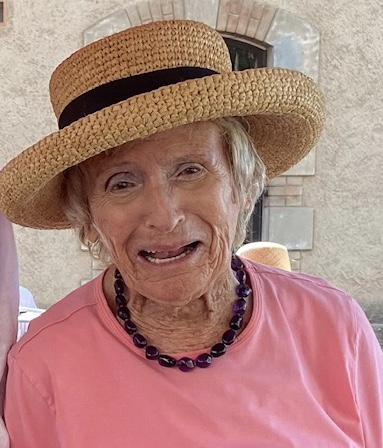
- Lasker-Harpprecht in 2020
- Born: 14 January 1924; Breslau, Lower Silesia, Prussia, Germany
- Died: 3 January 2021 (aged 96); La Croix-Valmer, France
- Occupations: Author; Journalist

Renate Lasker-Harpprecht (14 January 1924 – 3 January 2021) was a German author and journalist. She survived the Holocaust, having been imprisoned at Auschwitz and Bergen-Belsen.

== Biography ==
Lasker-Harpprecht was arrested on 5 June 1943 along with her sister, Anita, who was a member of the Women's Orchestra in Auschwitz. The two sisters survived and were interviewed by Patrick Gordon Walker on 15 April 1945 at Bergen-Belsen, which was one of the first interviews of a Holocaust survivor. The recording was lost but later found by Bayerischer Rundfunk in the German Broadcasting Archive.

After she gained her freedom, Lasker-Harpprecht became an interpreter for the British Army for the remainder of World War II. She later worked in London for the BBC, as well as Westdeutscher Rundfunk in Cologne and ZDF in the United States. In 1982, she moved to France where she spent the remainder of her life alongside her husband, Klaus Harpprecht until his death in September 2016. In 2016, she received the Preis für Verständigung und Toleranz, awarded by the Jewish Museum Berlin. She died in La Croix-Valmer on 3 January 2021 at the age of 96.

== Publications ==
- Familienspiele (1972)
- Es war der Tag, an dem das Leben noch einmal begann (2002)
