= Taylor Downing =

British historian and television producer

Taylor Downing (born 20 July 1953) is a British historian and television producer. He studied at Latymer Upper School and Christ's College, Cambridge University, where he achieved a Double First in History. He worked at the Imperial War Museum and then for Thames Television for several years. In 1982, he formed a production company Flashback Television, for which he produced more than 300 TV documentaries for British and American broadcasters including several long-running series which have won many awards. He has recently written several popular history books. Downing is a Fellow of the Royal Historical Society.

== Biography ==
He was born in West London and educated at Latymer Upper School in Hammersmith. In 1972, he entered Christ's College, Cambridge, where he studied history under scholars including Simon Schama and J. H. Plumb, graduating with a Double First. He later pursued postgraduate studies in film at the University of Bristol.

== Career ==
=== Early career ===
Downing began his career in 1976 at the Imperial War Museum, working as a cataloguer of archival film. He subsequently taught history at the University of Leeds before joining Thames Television as a researcher in 1977. There he worked on major historical series, including Palestine (1979), which won an International Emmy Award, and The Troubles (1982), a documentary series on Northern Ireland.

He later worked with Granada Television and Central Television, where he began directing documentaries. Returning to Thames Television, he produced and directed The Longest War and The People’s War, focusing on Palestinian history and the British home front during the Second World War.

=== Flashback Television and production career ===
In 1982, Downing co-founded Flashback Television, an independent production company established alongside the launch of Channel 4. He served as managing director and later head of history for nearly three decades.

Through Flashback, Downing produced and directed numerous documentaries and series, including The Games in Question (1984), a history of the Olympic Games, and a trilogy on the Olympic movement: Going for Gold (1986), Selling the Games (1987), and Running the Games (1988). Other productions included The Palestinians (1988), Civil War, and various drama-documentaries for ITV and Channel 4.

In the 1990s, he collaborated with Jeremy Isaacs on the landmark 24-part series Cold War for CNN and the BBC, contributing as director and co-author of the accompanying book. He also produced major documentary series such as Battle Stations (2000–2004), The Lost Evidence (2004–2006), and Weaponology (2008). His 2009 documentary 1983 – The Brink of Apocalypse received the Grierson Award for Best Historical Documentary.

== Writing career ==
After leaving television production in 2010, Taylor Downing focused on writing popular history, producing a series of works on military history, intelligence, and twentieth-century conflict. His publications include Churchill’s War Lab (2010), Spies in the Sky (2011), Olympia (2012), The World at War (2012), Night Raid (2013), Secret Warriors (2014), Breakdown (2016), 1983: The World at the Brink (2018), 1942: Britain at the Brink (2022), and The Army That Never Was (2024).

These books have been published internationally, translated into multiple languages, and widely reviewed in the British press. Critics have frequently noted their narrative pace and accessibility, with commentators such as Dominic Sandbrook and Max Hastings praising their readability and vivid historical reconstruction, while Andrew Roberts has highlighted their contribution to Second World War historiography. Downing is also a regular contributor to newspapers including The Sunday Times and The Observer, and has written extensively for Military History Matters, where he contributes a long-running feature on war films.

Downing has lectured widely at institutions including the Imperial War Museum, Bletchley Park, and the National Army Museum. He regularly talks at literary festivals and has appeared in many podcasts including The Rest is History and Dan Snow’s History Hit, and in television documentaries.

He has also been involved in academic and public history initiatives, including organizing a conference on history and the media with David Cannadine at the University of London. He has served as a judge for the History Today Book Prize and as a trustee of the Institute of Contemporary History.

== Personal life ==
Downing is married and lives in London and Devon.
