= Jewish Museum Berlin =

Museum in Berlin, Germany

- Jüdisches Museum Berlin

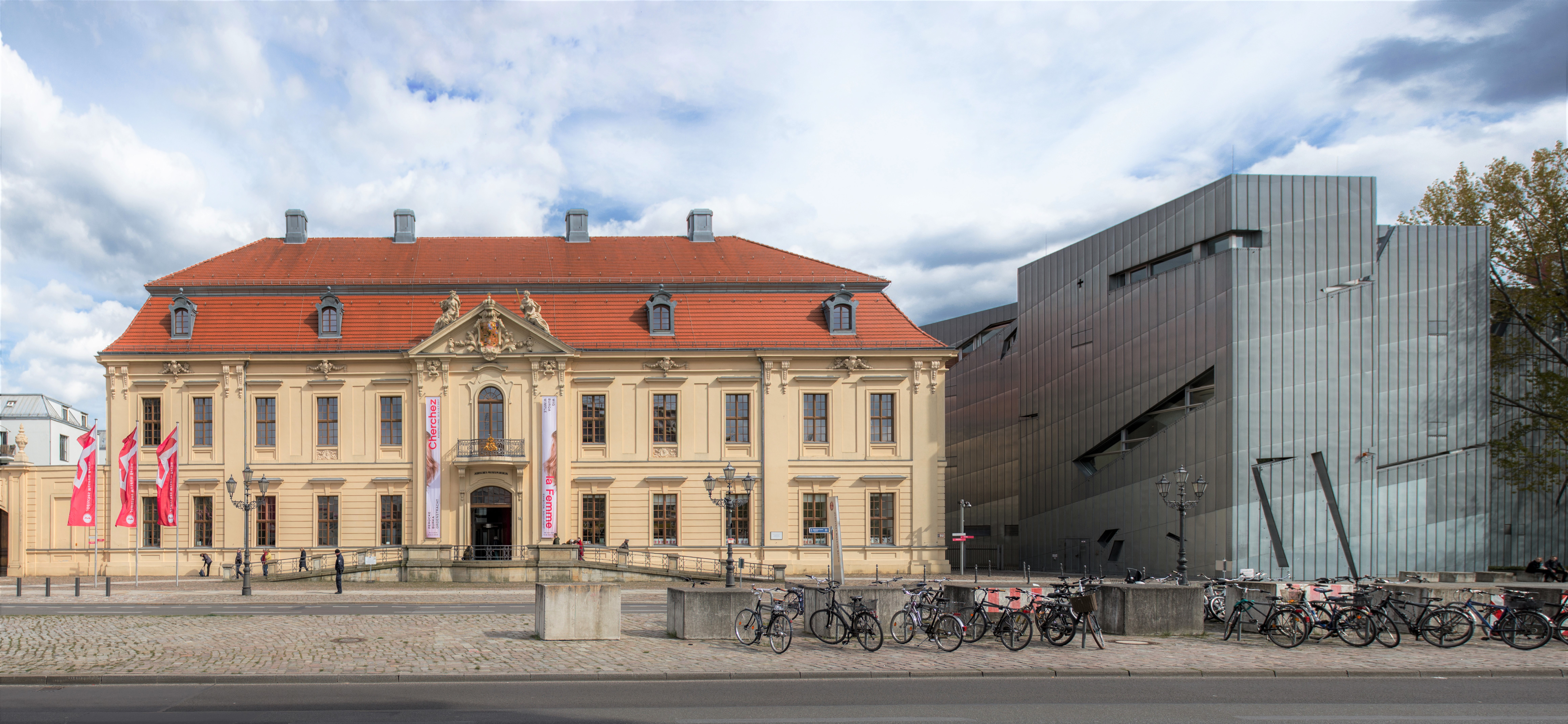
- The Kollegienhaus (1735) and Libeskind-Bau (1992)
- Established: 2001
- Location: Kreuzberg, Berlin, Germany
- Coordinates: 52°30′07″N 13°23′42″E
- Type: Jewish museum
- Director: Hetty Berg
- Architect: Daniel Libeskind
- Website: www.jmberlin.de/en

The Jewish Museum Berlin (Jüdisches Museum Berlin) was opened in 2001 and is the largest Jewish museum in Europe. On 3,500 square metres (38,000 square feet) of floor space, the museum presents the history of the Jews in Germany from the Middle Ages to the present day, with new focuses and new scenography. It consists of three buildings, two of which are new additions specifically built for the museum by architect Daniel Libeskind. German-Jewish history is documented in the collections, the library and the archive, and is reflected in the museum's program of events.

From its opening in 2001 to December 2017, the museum had over eleven million visitors and is one of the most visited museums in Germany.

Opposite the building ensemble, the W. Michael Blumenthal Academy of the Jewish Museum Berlin was built – also after a design by Libeskind – in 2011/2012 in the former flower market hall. The archives, library, museum education department, a lecture hall and the Diaspora Garden can all be found in the academy.

== History ==
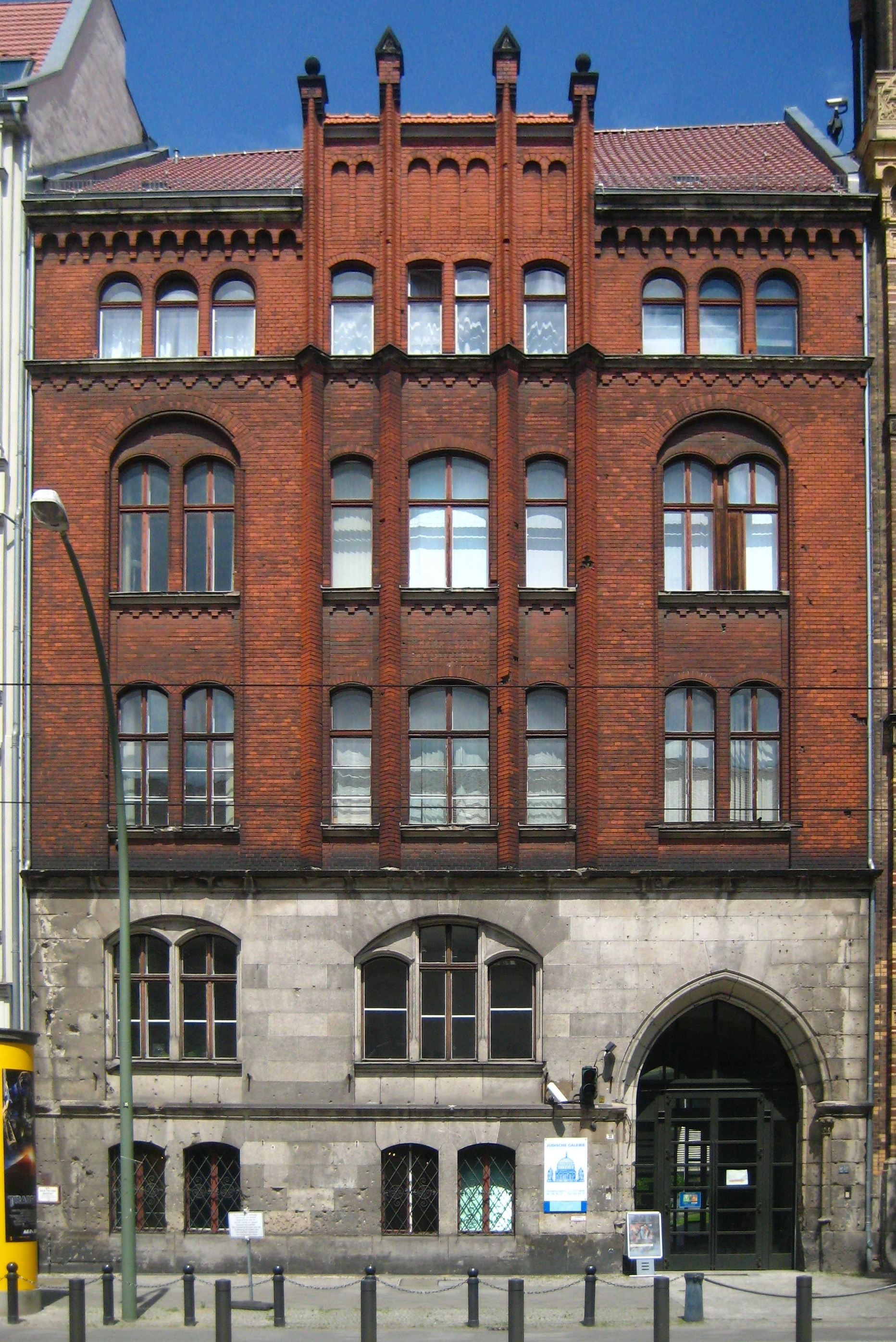
The original building on Oranienburger Straße. Originally used as a hospice, the building was remodeled for use as a museum.

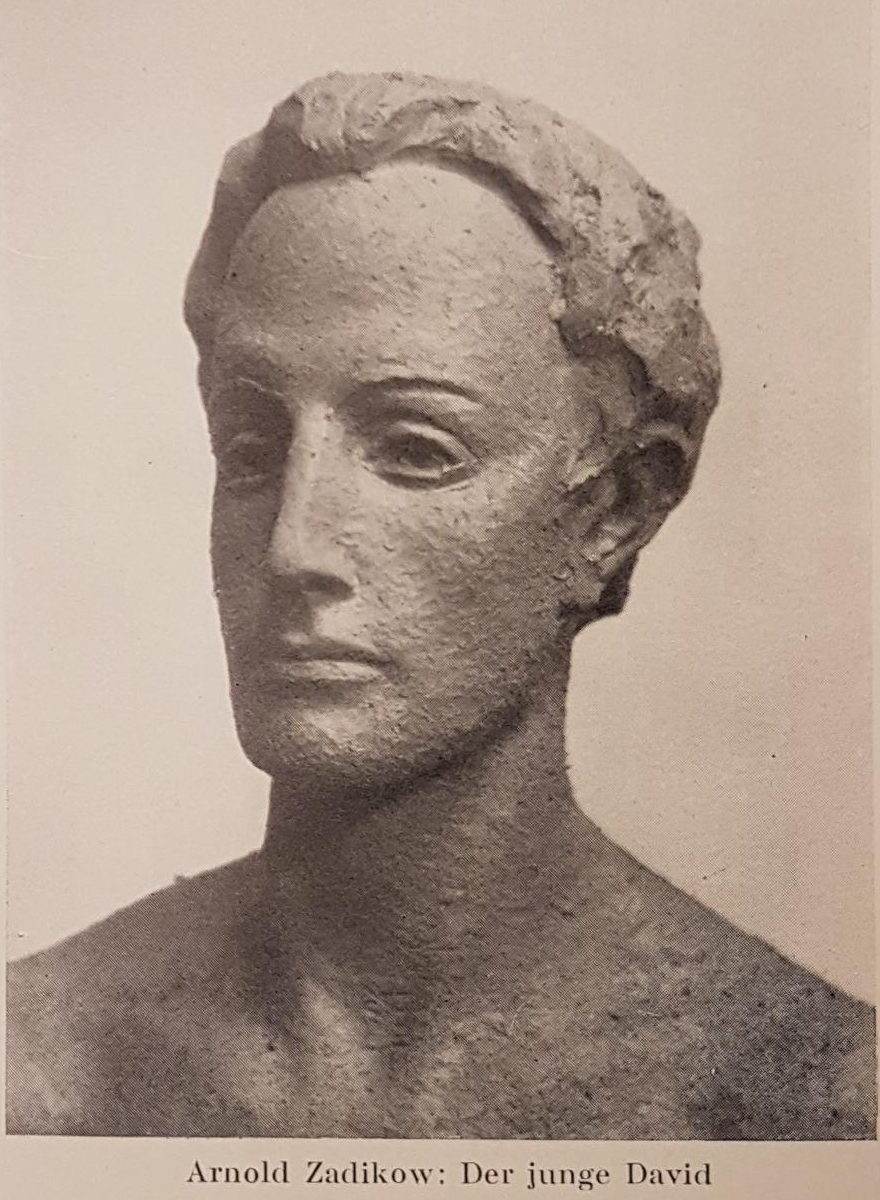
Arnold Zadikow's celebrated lost sculpture of The Young David was placed in the entrance of the museum

The first Jewish Museum in Berlin was founded on 24 January 1933, under the leadership of Karl Schwartz, six days before the Nazis officially gained power. The museum was built next to the Neue Synagoge on Oranienburger Straße and, in addition to curating Jewish history, also featured collections of modern Jewish art. Schwartz intended the museum as a means to revitalise Jewish creativity, and to demonstrate that Jewish history was living history. The museum's art collection was also seen as a contribution to German art history and one of the last exhibitions to be held was a retrospective of the German impressionist, Ernst Oppler in 1937. To reflect this focus on living history, the entrance hall of the museum both contained busts of prominent German Jews, such as Moses Mendelssohn and Abraham Geiger, and also a number of works by contemporary Jewish artists such as Arnold Zadikow and Lesser Ury.

On 10 November 1938, during the 'November Pogroms', known as Kristallnacht, the museum was shut down by the Gestapo, and the museum's inventory was confiscated. In 1976 a "Society for a Jewish Museum" formed and, three years later, the Berlin Museum, which chronicled the city's history, established a Jewish Department, but already, discussions about constructing a new museum dedicated to Jewish history in Berlin were being held.

In 1988, the Berlin government announced an anonymous competition for the new museum's design, with a jury chaired by Josef Paul Kleihues. A year later, Daniel Libeskind's design was chosen from among 189 submissions by the committee for what was then planned as a "Jewish Department" for the Berlin Museum. While other entrants proposed cool, neutral spaces, Libeskind offered a radical, zigzag design, which earned the nickname "Blitz" ("Lightning").

In 1991, Berlin's government temporarily canceled the project to finance its bid for the 2000 Summer Olympics. Six months later the decision was reversed and construction on the $65 million extension to the Berlin Museum began in November 1992. The empty museum was completed in 1999 and attracted over 350,000 people before it was filled and opened on 9 September 2001.

== Design ==
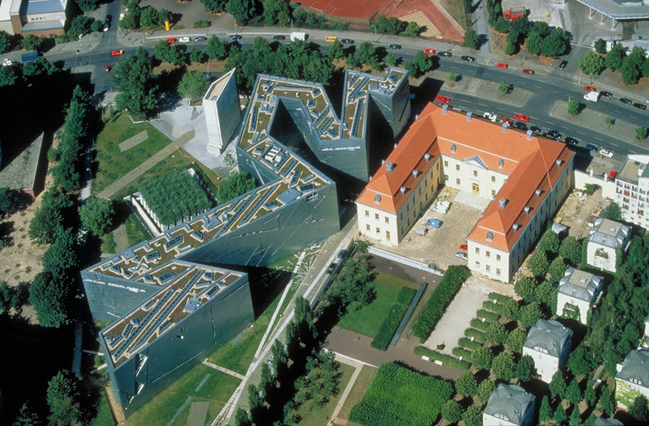
The Kollegienhaus building is the U-shaped building in the foreground; Libeskind's building is the adjacent zig-zag structure.

The Jewish Museum Berlin is located in what was West Berlin before the fall of the Wall. Essentially, it consists of two buildings – a baroque old building, the "Kollegienhaus" (that formerly housed the Berlin Museum) and a new, deconstructivist-style building by Libeskind. The two buildings have no visible connection above ground. The Libeskind building, consisting of about 15,000 m^{2} (160,000 sq ft), is a twisted zig-zag and is accessible only via an underground passage from the old building.

For Libeskind,

The new design, which was created a year before the Berlin Wall came down, was based on three conceptions that formed the museum's foundation: first, the impossibility of understanding the history of Berlin without understanding the enormous intellectual, economic and cultural contribution made by the Jewish citizens of Berlin, second, the necessity to integrate physically and spiritually the meaning of the Holocaust into the consciousness and memory of the city of Berlin. Third, that only through the acknowledgement and incorporation of this erasure and void of Jewish life in Berlin, can the history of Berlin and Europe have a human future.

A line of "Voids", empty spaces about 66 feet (20 m) tall, slices linearly through the entire building. Such voids represent "That which can never be exhibited when it comes to Jewish Berlin history: Humanity reduced to ashes."

In the basement, visitors first encounter three intersecting, slanting corridors named the "Axes." Here a similarity to Libeskind's first building – the Felix Nussbaum Haus – is apparent, which is also divided into three areas with different meanings. In Berlin, the three axes symbolize three paths of Jewish life in Germany – continuity in German history, emigration from Germany, and the Holocaust.

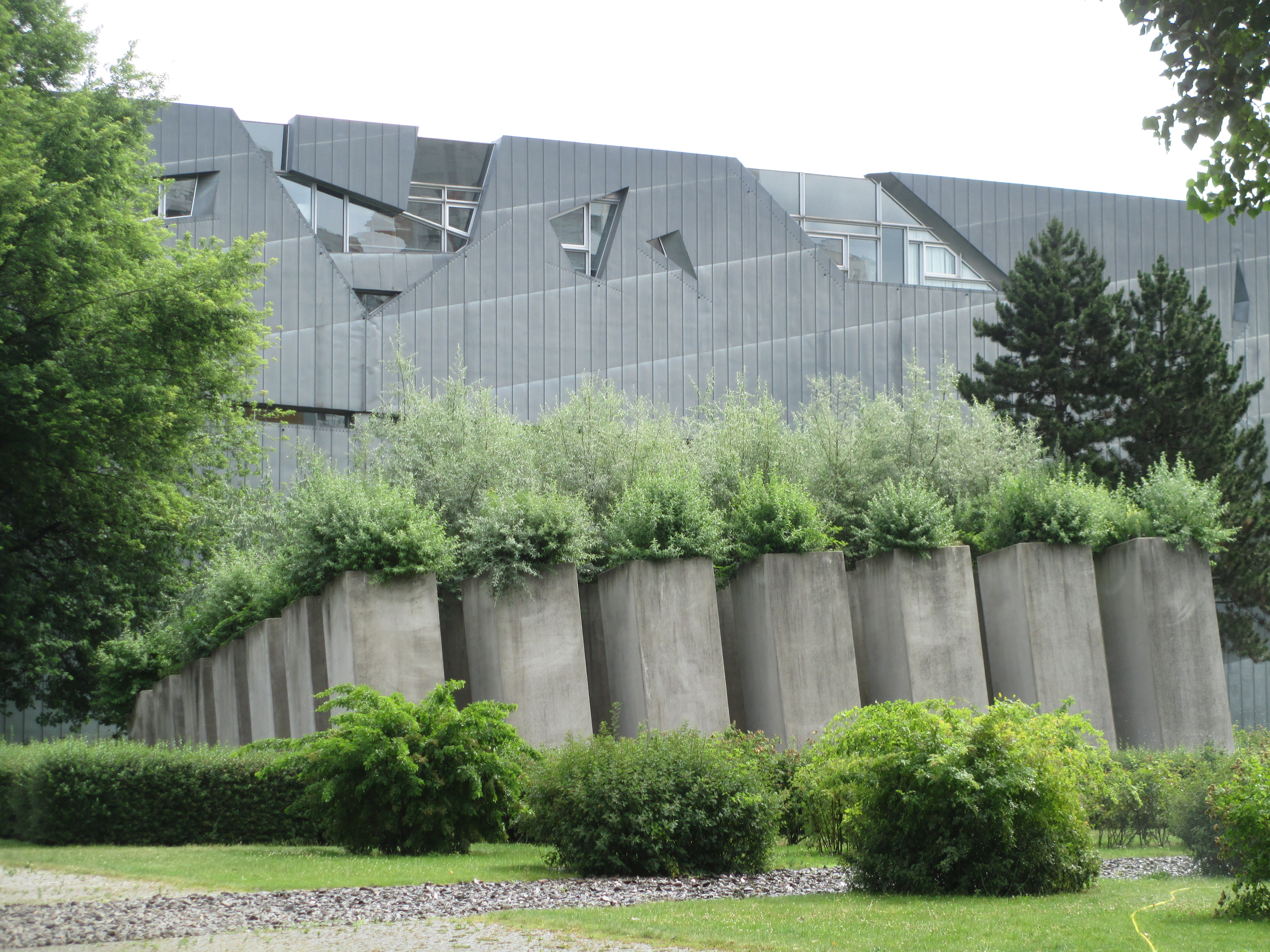
The Garden of Exile

The second axis connects the Museum proper to the Garden of Exile, whose foundation is tilted. The Garden's oleaster grows out of reach, atop 49 tall pillars (48 filled with Berlin's earth, one with earth from Jerusalem). The third axis leads from the Museum to the Holocaust Tower, a 24 m (79 ft) tall empty silo. The bare concrete Tower is neither heated nor cooled, and its only light comes from a small slit in its roof. The Jewish Museum Berlin was Libeskind's first major international success.

In recent years, Libeskind has designed two structural extensions: a covering made of glass and steel for the "Kollegienhaus" courtyard (2007), and the W. Michael Blumenthal Academy of the Jewish Museum in a rectangular, 250 m^{2} (2,700 sq ft) 1960s flower market hall on the opposite side of the street (2012).

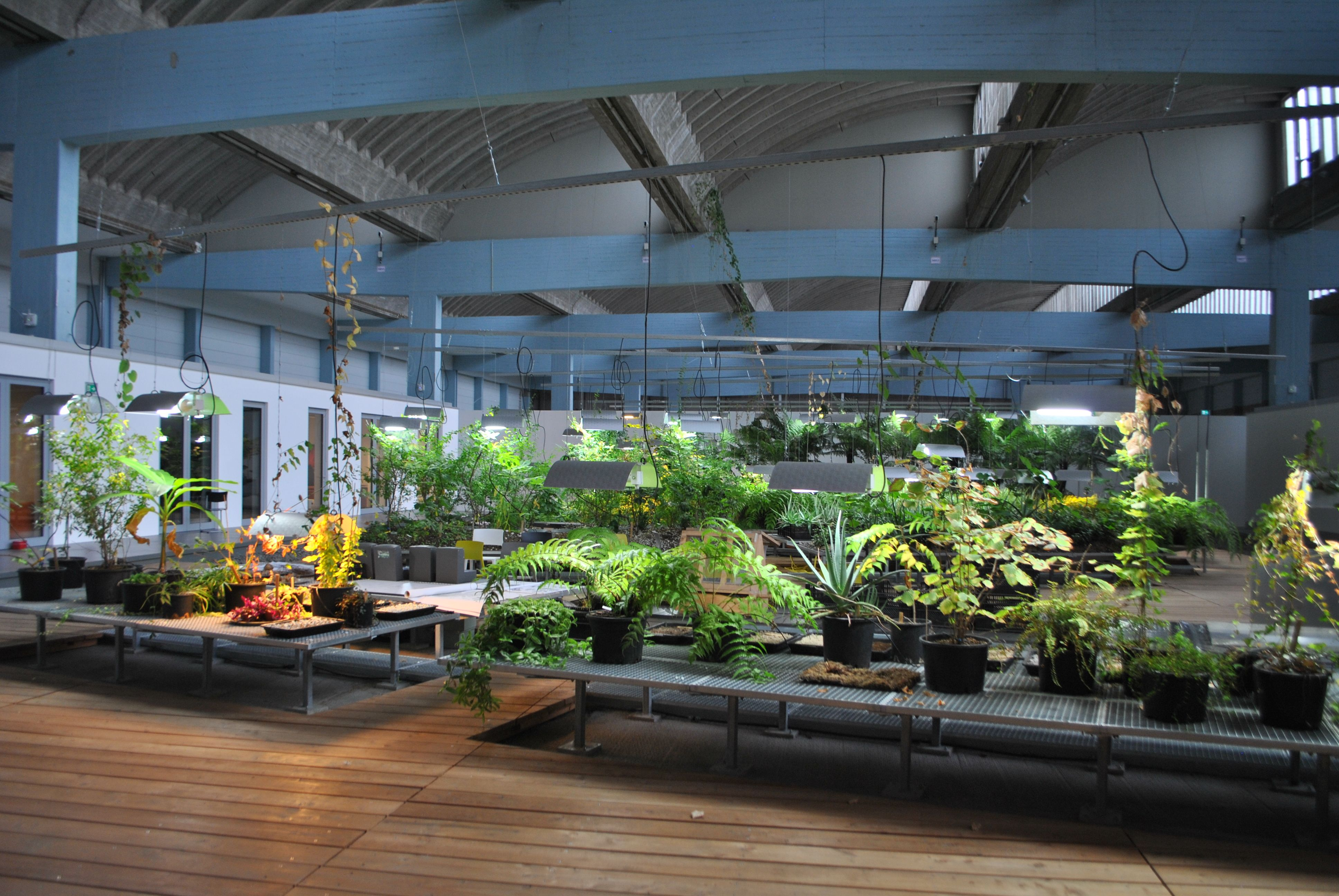
The diaspora garden at the W. Michael Blumenthal Academy

In 2016, a jury appointed by the Jewish Museum Berlin awarded the first prize in an architectural competition for a new €3.44 million children's museum for 3 to 12 year-olds to Olson Kundig Architects; the second prize was awarded to the Berlin firm Staab Architekten and third prize to Michael Wallraff of Vienna. The children's museum opened on 27 June 2021, and is housed in the W. Michael Blumenthal Academy.

== Exhibitions ==
=== Permanent exhibition ===
The new core exhibition entitled "Jewish Life in Germany: Past and Present" opened on 23 August 2020. Covering more than 3,500 square meters, it tells the story of Jews in Germany from their beginnings to the present day from a Jewish perspective.

The exhibition is divided into five historical chapters spanning from the beginnings of Jewish life in Ashkenaz, through the emancipation movement, the Enlightenment, and its failure, to the present. The largest space is dedicated to National Socialism and the chapter After 1945, where topics such as restitution and reparation, the relationship to Israel and Russian-speaking immigration from 1990 onwards are the central themes. As a "final chorus," the video installation "Mesubin" (The Gathered) brings the polyphony of contemporary Jewish together. Eight thematic rooms deal with religious aspects of Judaism and its lived practice, with the museum's family collections, and with art and music. What is sacred in Judaism? How is Shabbat celebrated? What is the sound of Judaism? In addition to original objects, the exhibition presents a wide variety of audio-visual media, virtual reality, art and interactive games.

==== The previous permanent exhibition ====
The previous permanent exhibition "Two Millennia of German Jewish History" was on display from September 2001 to December 2017. It presented Germany through the eyes of the Jewish minority. The exhibition began with displays of medieval settlements along the Rhine, in particular in Speyer, Worms and Mayence. The Baroque period was regarded through the lens of Glikl bas Judah Leib (1646–1724, also known as Glückel von Hameln), who left a diary detailing her life as a Jewish business woman in Hamburg. The intellectual and personal legacies of philosopher Moses Mendelssohn (1729–1786) were next; both figures were flanked by depictions of Jews in court and country. The Age of Emancipation in the nineteenth century was presented as a time of optimism, achievement and prosperity, though setbacks and disappointments were displayed as well. German-Jewish soldiers fighting for their country in World War I stood at the beginning of the twentieth century. One focus of the exhibition was Berlin and its development into a European metropolis. The Jews living here as merchants and entrepreneurs, scientists and artists, were pioneers of the modern age.

In the section on Nazis, emphasis was placed on the ways in which Jews reacted to the increasing discrimination against them, such as founding Jewish schools and social services. After the Holocaust, 250,000 survivors waited in "Displaced Persons" camps for the possibility to emigrate. At the same time, small Jewish communities in West and East were forming. Towards the end of the exhibition, two major Nazi trials of the post-war period were examined – the Frankfurt Auschwitz trial (1963–1965) and the Majdanek trial in Düsseldorf (1975–1981). The exhibition tour concluded with an audio installation of people who grew up in Germany reporting on their childhood and youth after 1945. A new chapter of Jewish life in Germany began with them.

=== Special exhibitions ===
Changing exhibitions present a broad range of themes, eras and genres. Notable exhibitions are: Welcome to Jerusalem (2017–2019); Cherchez la femme (2017); Golem (2016–2017); Snip it! Stances on Ritual Circumcision (2014–2015); A Time for Everything. Rituals Against Forgetting (2013–2014); The Whole Truth … everything you always wanted to know about Jews (2013); Obsessions (2012–2013); How German is it? 30 Artists' Notion of Home (2011–2012); Kosher & Co: On Food and Religion (2009–2010); Looting and Restitution: Jewish-Owned Cultural Artifacts from 1933 to the Present (2008–2009); Typical!: Clichés about Jews and Others (2008); Home and Exile: Jewish Emigration from Germany since 1933 (2006–2007); Chrismukkah: Stories of Christmas and Hanukkah (2005–2006); 10+5=God (2004); and Counterpoint: The Architecture of Daniel Libeskind (2003).

== Permanent installations ==
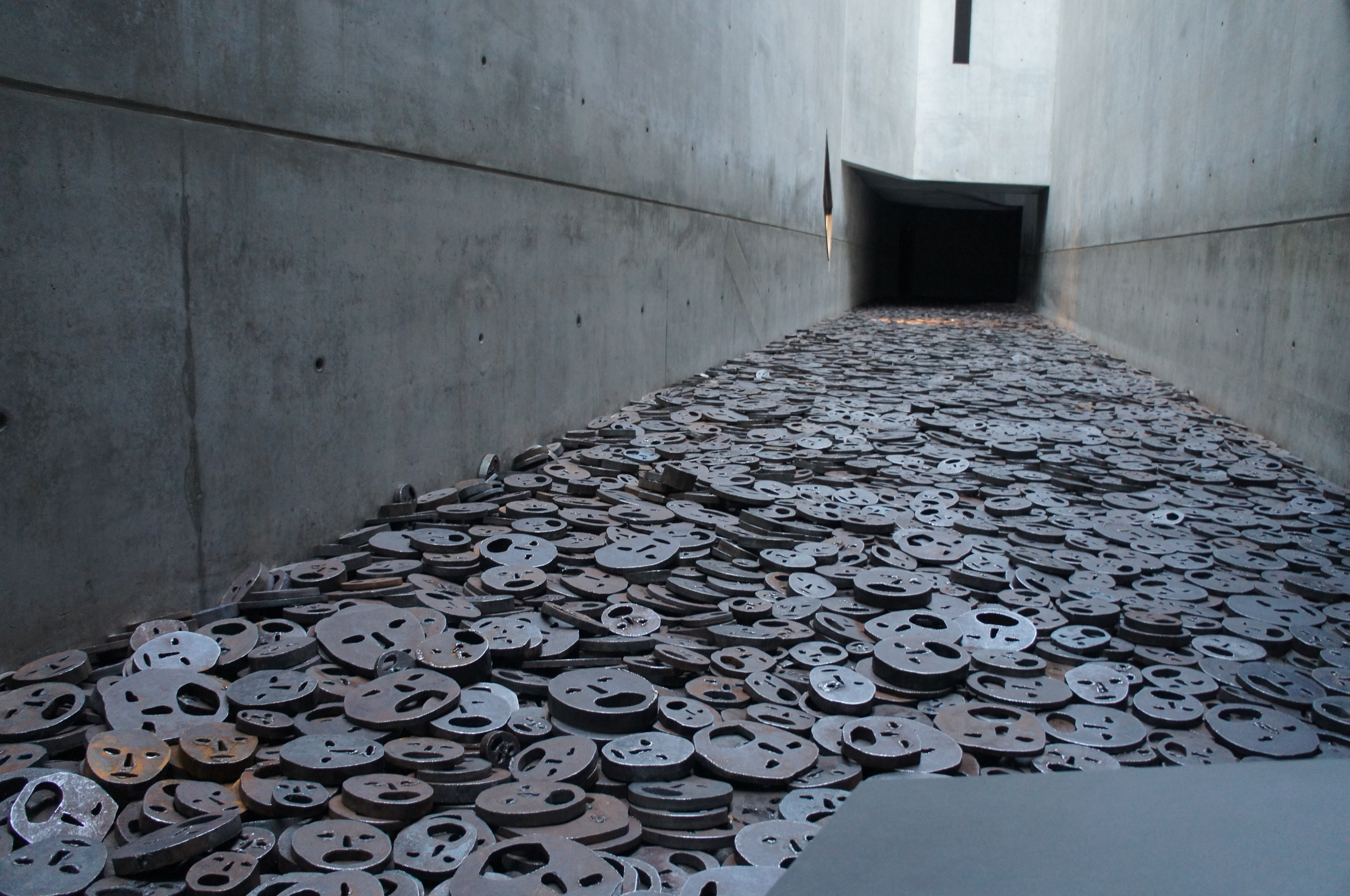
Shalekhet, Menashe Kadishman (1997–2001)

Israeli artist Menashe Kadishman created the installation Shalekhet – Fallen leaves, 10,000 faces punched out of steel and distributed on the ground of the Memory Void, the only empty or "voided" space of the Libeskind Building that can be entered. Kadishman dedicated his artwork not only to Jews killed during the Shoah, but to all victims of violence and war. Visitors are invited to walk on the faces and listen to the sounds created by the metal sheets, as they clang and rattle against one another.

=== Another art installation ===
The 'Gallery of the Missing' is a project by the artist Via Lewandowsky. It involves three sound installations under the title 'Order of the Missing' in black mirrored glass showcases (glass bodies) that cannot be seen in the permanent exhibition. They depict destroyed objects of Jewish culture: the Encyclopaedia Judaica, the Jewish hospital in Frankfurt and the sculpture "Großer Kopf" by Otto Freundlich. The shape of the black glass bodies refers to the "voids," the empty spaces made of concrete in Daniel Libeskind's museum architecture. Using infrared headphones, visitors can listen to up to 40 sound recordings with descriptions, explanations and background information, sounds and music for each object presented as they move along the black glass walls.

== Collections and archives ==
The Jewish Museum's collections date back to the 1970s, when the Society for a Jewish Museum formed. The first acquisitions were Jewish ceremonial artworks belonging to the Münster Cantor Zvi Sofer. Soon, fine art, photography and family memorabilia were acquired. The collection is now divided into four areas: ceremonial objects and applied arts, fine arts, photography, and lastly, everyday culture. The museum archive safeguards over 1,500 family bequests, in particular from the eras of the Empire, the First World War, and Nazism. The library comprises 100 000 media on Jewish life in Germany and abroad.

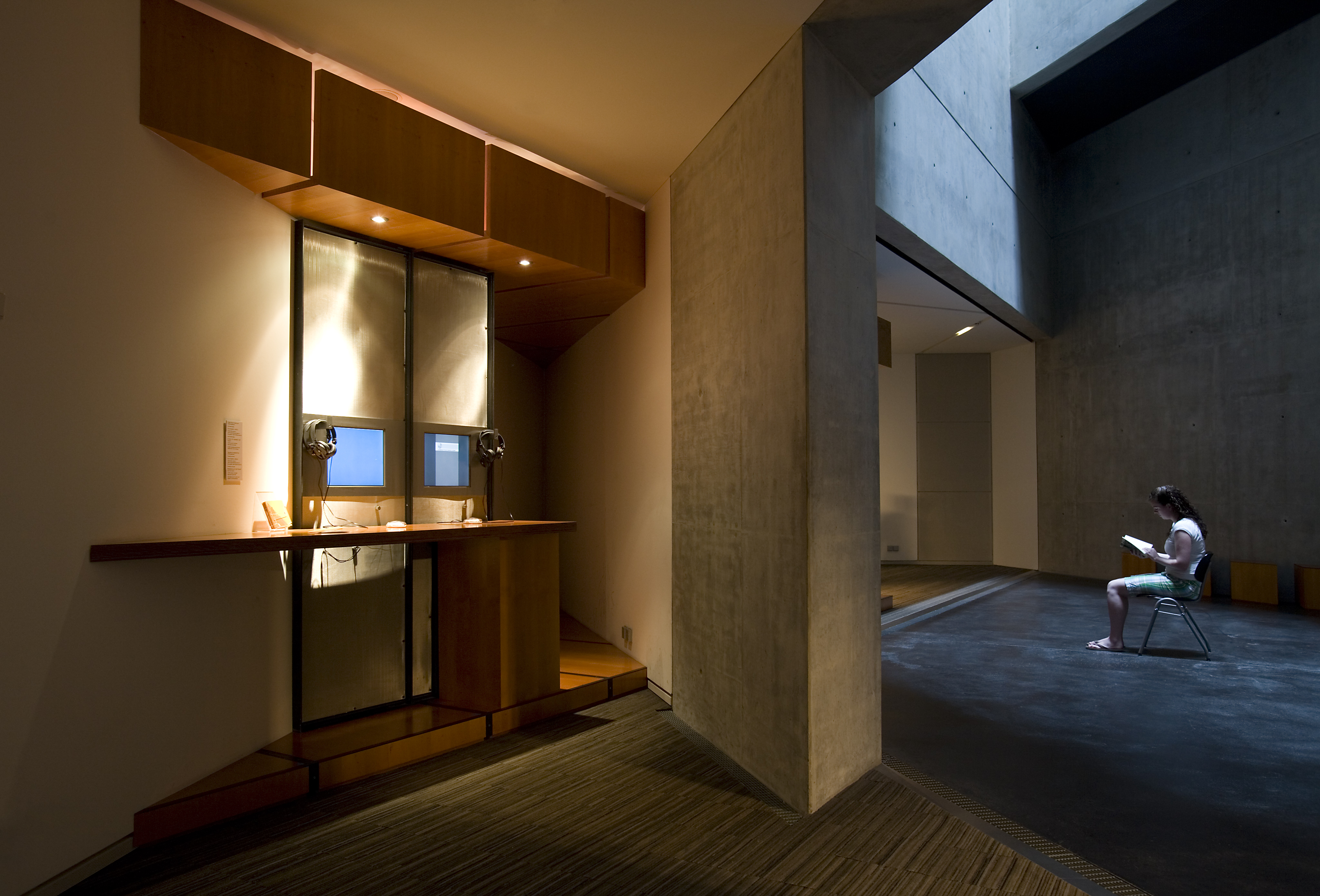
Modern media exhibition space

=== The Leo Baeck Institute archive ===
Since September 2001, a branch of the archive of the New York-based Leo Baeck Institute has been located at the Jewish Museum. The LBI's principal office is in New York. Its collections document the history of Jews in Germany, Austria, and other German-speaking areas of Central Europe over the past 300 years. The collections include approximately one million documents, including records from local authorities, personal documents, correspondence, photographs, and testimonies relating to religious, social, cultural, intellectual, political, and economic life. The institute also holds more than 1,200 memoirs by German-speaking Jews, including accounts from the post-Nazi period.

== Other facilities ==
=== Rafael Roth Learning Center ===
The Rafael Roth Learning Center was located in the basement of the Jewish Museum Berlin until March 2017. Here, Jewish history was presented in a multimedia and interactive way at 17 computer stations for individual visitors and groups. Under the headings "Things," "Stories," and "Faces," visitors learned about particular highlights of the collection and were able to delve into larger-scale virtual exhibitions – for example, on the life story of Albert Einstein or on Eastern European immigration between 1880 and 1924. Video interviews offered insights into current Jewish life in Germany. The computer game Sansanvis Park was developed especially for children. The facility was named after the Berlin real estate entrepreneur and patron Rafael Roth (1933–2013).

In the course of planning a new permanent exhibition, the Jewish Museum decided not to continue operating the Learning Center with its technical equipment after more than 15 successful years.

=== W. Michael Blumenthal Academy ===
With the opening of the academy in 2012, its programs were added to the previous range of activities. Founding director W. Michael Blumenthal, after whom the academy is named, aimed to establish a Jewish museum that not only presented historical, religious, and social topics at exhibitions, but closely followed and discussed political and social developments from a Jewish angle. The academy programs focus not only on the relationship between the majority population and individual minorities, but also on the interactions and ties between these minorities.

== Management ==
=== Funding ===
The Jewish Museum Berlin Foundation receives an annual grant from the funds of the Federal Government Commissioner for Cultural Affairs and the Media; this covers around three-quarters of its total budget. The remaining funds are raised primarily through donations and ticket sales.

=== Directors ===
- 1997–2014: W. Michael Blumenthal
- 2014–2019: Peter Schäfer
- from 2020: Hetty Berg

== Prize for Understanding and Tolerance ==
Since 2002, the Jewish Museum Berlin and the Friends and Patrons of the Jewish Museum Berlin have presented the annual Prize for Understanding and Tolerance. Past recipients included:

- 2002 – Berthold Beitz, Heinrich von Pierer
- 2003 – Otto Schily, Friede Springer
- 2004 – Michael Otto, Johannes Rau
- 2005 – Heinz Berggruen, Otto Graf Lambsdorff
- 2006 – Daniel Barenboim, Helmut Panke
- 2007 – Helmut Kohl, Fritz Stern
- 2008 – Roland Berger, Imre Kertész
- 2009 – Franz Fehrenbach and Christof Bosch (representing Bosch), Michael Verhoeven
- 2010 – Jan Philipp Reemtsma, Hubertus Erlen
- 2011 – Angela Merkel
- 2012 – Klaus Mangold, Richard von Weizsäcker
- 2013 – Berthold Leibinger, Iris Berben
- 2014 – Wolfgang Schäuble, Hubert Burda
- 2015 – W. Michael Blumenthal
- 2016 – Anita Lasker-Wallfisch and Renate Lasker-Harpprecht, Hasso Plattner
- 2017 – Joachim Gauck, Joe Kaeser
- 2018 – David Grossman, Susanne Klatten
- 2019 – Heiko Maas, Anselm Kiefer
- 2020 – Madeleine Albright, Igor Levit
- 2022 – Barrie Kosky, Herta Müller
- 2023 – Corinne Michaela Flick, Wolfgang Ischinger
- 2024 – Margot Friedländer, Delphine Horvilleur
- 2025 – Amy Gutmann, Daniel Zajfman
- 2026 – Düzen Tekkal, Michael Moritz

== Controversy ==
By 2019, the museum was dubbed the "Anti-Jewish Museum" due to hosting a series of speakers favorable to the Boycott, Divestment and Sanctions movement. In February 2019, the German government indicated that it would take steps to prevent the museum becoming a platform for BDS. In May 2019 the German Bundestag passed a resolution calling the BDS anti-Semitic. In June 2019, then-director Schäfer used the museum's official Twitter account to retweet a call by 240 Jewish and Israeli academics for the German government to not equate BDS with anti-Semitism, to protect freedom of expression and assembly, and to fight anti-Semitism. Josef Schuster, president of the Central Council of Jews in Germany, said, "Under these circumstances, one has to think about whether the term 'Jewish' is still appropriate." Schäfer resigned a week later "to avoid further damage". After his resignation he wrote a book on the history of anti-Semitism.

== Sources ==
- Van Uffelen, Chris. Contemporary Museums – Architecture, History, Collections, Braun Publishing, 2010; ISBN 978-3-03768-067-4, pp. 214–17.
- Simon, H. (2000). Das Berliner Jüdische Museum in der Oranienburger Strasse: Geschichte einer zerstörten Kulturstätte. Hentrich & Hentrich. ISBN 978-3-933471-14-7
- Brenner, M. (1999). Jewish Culture in Contemporary America and Weimar Germany: Parallels and Differences. Central European University Jewish Studies Yearbook, 2(2).

== See also ==
- Jewish Museum, Emmendingen
- Jewish Museum Frankfurt
- Jewish Museum Munich
- Jews in Germany
