= William Baines =

English composer

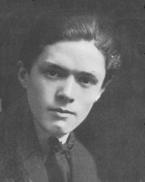
William Baines, c. 1920

William Baines (26 March 1899 – 6 November 1922) was an English pianist and composer who wrote more than 150 works for solo piano and a number of larger orchestral works before his early death from tuberculosis at the age of 23.

== Life ==
Born in Horbury near Wakefield, Yorkshire, Baines came from a musical family. His father was a cinema pianist and organist at a Primitive Methodist Chapel. Encouraged by his parents, Baines began piano lessons at a young age and had formal lessons at the Yorkshire Training College of Music in Leeds, although his later compositional style was largely self-taught. In 1913 the family moved to Cleckheaton and whilst there Baines attended Bradford Permanent Orchestral Society concerts and acquainted himself with the basic orchestral repertoire. The family moved to York in 1917 where, aged 18, Baines became a professional musician and gave his first public piano recital at which a number of his original compositions were heard. He wrote a symphony which was not performed until 1991.

In 1918 Baines was conscripted into the British Army during the last months of World War I. Within a fortnight of being called up, he was hospitalised due to septic poisoning. The war was over by the time he was discharged, and his health, already delicate, never fully recovered. Meanwhile, his compositions were starting to be noticed. In March 1920 Dr Arthur Eaglefield Hull of Huddersfield wrote an article in the British Music Society Journal declaring him "a genius". The pianist Frederick Dawson (1868-1940) also took a great interest, including music by Baines in his recitals.

He continued to compose and give recitals until a few months before his death, although his only major recital outside Yorkshire was in Bournemouth at the invitation of the conductor Sir Dan Godfrey in 1921.

=== Legacy ===
The pianist Lilian Evetts performed Baines' music in the 1930s. Robert Keys championed his piano music in the 1950s. But it was not until fifty years after his death that the Yorkshire artist Richard Bell instigated a wider revival of interest in Baines with a publication, two recitals by Eric Parkin and an exhibition at the 1972 Harrogate Festival. A biography, Goodnight to Flamboro by Roger Carpenter (with illustrations by Bell) followed in 1977, published by the Triad Press. Baines was the subject of a 90-minute drama written by Martyn Wade for BBC Radio 3 first broadcast in 1989, called Goodnight to Flamboro', which traced the final months of his life. The music in the play was performed by Simon Kenworthy. His Symphony in C minor was premiered by the Airedale Symphony Orchestra under George Kennaway at the Grassington Festival in 1991, whilst the Poem for piano and orchestra was heard for the first time in August 2025 at Bradford Live, with soloist Yuanfan Yang, joined by the Yorkshire Symphony Orchestra and Ben Crick.

== Works ==
Despite his youth, William Baines completed roughly 150 works, mostly in the genre of the piano miniature. Many of his piano pieces take inspiration from the natural world, and often have descriptive titles. Baines had big hands and his piano pieces, influenced by Scriabin, are difficult to play. Perhaps his best known compositions are the piano portrait "Goodnight to Flamboro'" and "The Lone Wreck" comprising the collection Tides, named after Flamborough Head, the promontory on the Yorkshire coast. His Seven Preludes from 1919 are considered to be amongst his finest compositions.

Orchestral pieces include the Symphony in C minor, Op. 10 (1917), a Poem for piano and orchestra (1920), the Prelude to a Doll's Ballet (1920) and two tone poems, The Island of the Fey (1919) and Thoughtdrift (1921). Chamber music includes a String Quartet in E major (1917–18), a Piano Trio (1918), and a Violin Sonata in G (1917–19).

=== Recordings ===
His piano works have twice been recorded by Eric Parkin – once for the Lyrita label, and later, a fuller selection on Priory – and by Peter Jacobs (2021) and Duncan Honeybourne (2022, also including the Five Songs). A number of Baines works (including some first recordings) have been recorded by Alan Cuckston, on Swinsty Records.

== Selected works ==
=== Orchestral ===
- Symphony in C minor (1917)
- The Island of the Fay (1919, also version for piano)
- Prelude to a Doll's Ballet (1920)
- Poem for piano and orchestra (1921)
- Thoughtdrift (1921)

=== Chamber ===
- Aubade for string quartet (1917)
- String Quartet in E major (1917–18)
- Sonata in G for violin and piano (1917–19)
- Piano Trio in D Minor in one movement (1918)
- Marionettes for violin and piano (1919)
- Dream Temple for violin and piano (1920)
- Rhapsody in F♯ minor for string quartet (1920)
- Two Fragments for string quartet (1920–21)
  - 'Quietude'
  - 'At the Time of Falling Leaves'
- Andante for string quartet (1922)

=== Piano ===
- Sonata in A minor (1917)
- Four Sketches (1917–18)
  - 'The Chimes'
  - 'Only a Few Wooden Soldiers'
  - 'Dreaming'
  - 'Little Imps'
- Introduction & Waltz Caprice (1918)
- Poem, Op. 6, No. 2 (1918)
- Paradise Gardens (1918–19)
- Seven Preludes (1919)
- Coloured Leaves (1919–20)
  - 'Prelude'
  - 'Valse'
  - 'Still Day'
  - 'Purple Heights'
- Four Poems (1919–20)
  - 'Poem-Fragment'
  - 'Elves'
  - 'Poem-Nocturne'
  - 'Appassionata'
- Three Concert Studies (1919–20)
  - 'Exultation'
  - 'The Naïad'
  - 'Radiance'
- Milestones (1920)
  - 'Ave! Imperator (Hail, Caesar!)
  - 'Angelus'
  - 'Milestones (A Walking Tune)'
- Tides (1920)
  - 'The Lone Wreck'
  - 'Goodnight to Flamboro'
- Sonata in F♯ minor (incomplete) (1918–21)
- Prelude (in G) (1921)
- Silverpoints (1921)
  - 'Labyrinth'
  - 'Water Pearls'
  - 'The Burning Joss Stick'
  - 'Floralia'
- Twilight Pieces (1921)
  - 'Twilight Woods - a Fragment'
  - 'Quietude'
  - 'A Pause of Thought'
- Prelude and Seven Diversions for two pianos (1921)
- Pictures of Light (1920–22)
  - 'Drift-light'
  - 'Bursting Flames'
  - 'Pool-lights'
- A Last Sheaf (1921–22)
  - 'Glancing Sunlight'
  - 'The Island of the Fay'
  - 'Etude in F# Minor'
  - 'A Pastoral'
- Nocturne from Sonata in F♯ minor (1922)
- Eight Preludes (1922), a posthumous grouping of late piano pieces by Robert Keys
  - 'Prelude in G' (1921)
  - 'Ebbing Tide'
  - 'Shade-Imagery' (1922)
  - 'Prelude in C'
  - 'Wind Sprites' (1921)
  - 'A Fairy Story'
  - 'Lullaby'
  - 'Eroica'

=== Vocal ===
- Five Songs (1919)
  - 'Fountains'
  - 'Fern Song'
  - 'By the Sea'
  - 'A Lyric'
  - 'Morning'
