= Arnold Zadikow =

German sculptor

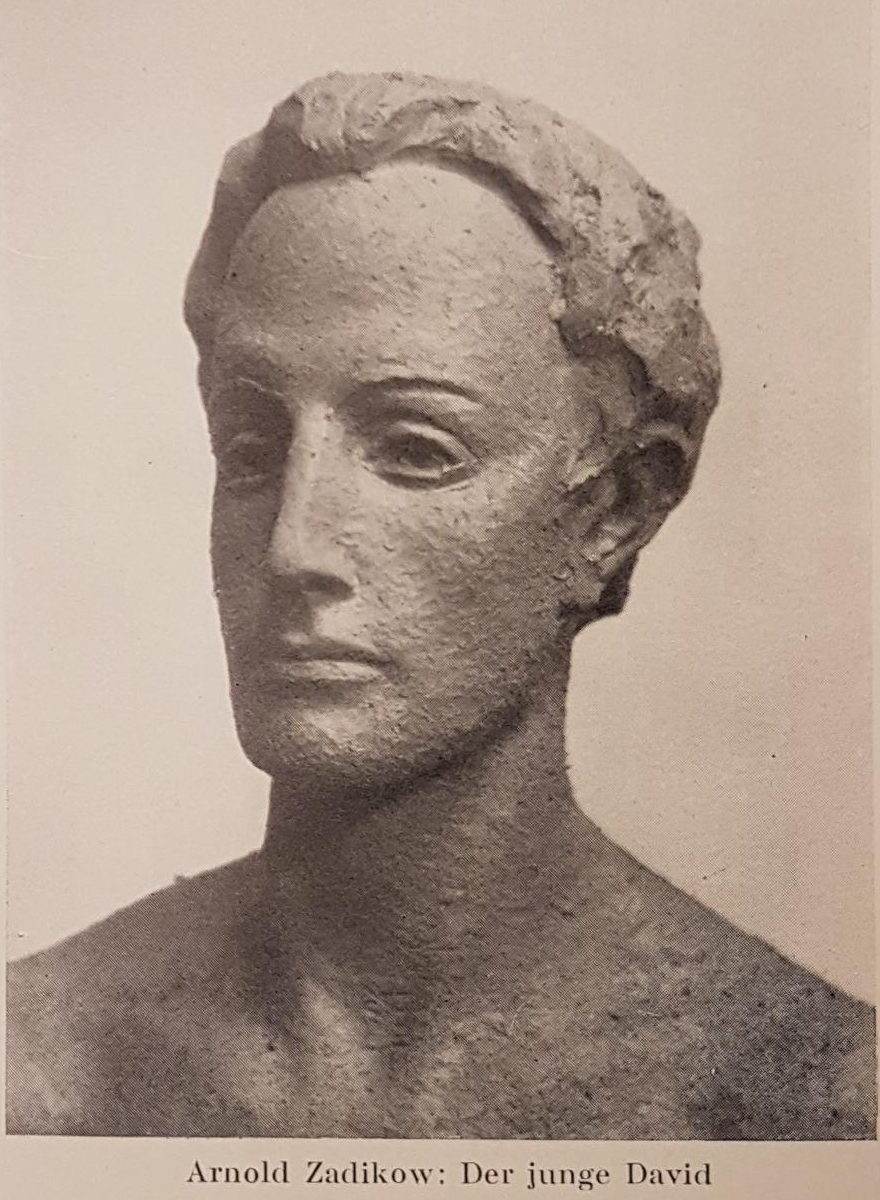
Zadikow's celebrated sculpture of The Young David

Arnold Zadikow (27 March 1884, in Kolberg, Pomerania – 8 March 1943, at the Theresienstadt Ghetto) was a modernist German-Jewish sculptor and medalist who worked in Germany and France. Zadikow studied under the neoclassical sculptor Heinrich Waderé and mainly worked on portrait busts, gravestones and plaques. He was a soldier on the Western Front during the Great War and sustained combat injuries in 1917 before being taken to a British prisoner of war camp. After the war, he dwelt mainly in Munich and Rome, but briefly worked in Paris in 1932. Zadikow liked to work with biblical motifs, and his sculpture of the young David was displayed in the entrance of the Berlin Jewish Museum in 1933. Considered his most important work, the statue was lost during the Second World War.

In 1933, sensing trouble for Germany's Jewish population, Zadikow moved to Prague with his wife Hilda and their daughter Marianka. He was later joined by other German artists such as Oskar Kokoschka, John Heartfield and Thomas Theodor Heine. In the wake of the Nazi invasion of Czechoslovakia in 1939, Jews in the country faced increasing persecution, and finally on 15 May 1942, the Zadikows were rounded up and ordered to board a train to Theresienstadt ghetto, where Arnold died. Hilda and Marianka were transported to Auschwitz-Birkenau the following year, but managed to survive long enough to be liberated in 1945.

Throughout his working life, Zadikow designed decorative gravestones, including that of the German physician and pioneering sexologist Magnus Hirschfeld. The upright headstone in gray granite is inset with a bronze bas-relief portrait of Hirschfeld in profile and the slab covering the tomb is engraved with Hirschfeld's Latin motto, "Per Scientiam ad Justitiam". Whilst in Paris, he was also commissioned by Albert Einstein to produce a headstone for a family member. According to Zadikow's daughter, Marianka, Einstein provided the family with an affidavit for use in an immigration application for the US; although Zadikow was unable to afford the visa.

== The Statue of The Young David ==
Created in 1921, Zadikow's statue in stone of The Young David was the centrepiece of the entrance to Berlin's Jewish Museum, when it opened in 1933 on the eve of the Nazi accession to power. Zadikow presented the biblical motif of David, carrying slingshot; a muscular warrior, that adhered to contemporary German conceptions of male beauty.

The figure of David represented Jewish military prowess, leading to Zadikow to remark of his work that Das ist meine Antwort an Hitler und die Nazis or "This is my answer to Hitler and the Nazis". The statue was displayed at a time that Jews were being portrayed as ugly and avaricious in common discourse. Considered degenerate by the Nazi regime and out of line with its prescribed aestheticism, the sculpture was eventually destroyed along with other pieces of his work in 1942.

=== Work ===
Arnold Zadikow's Work

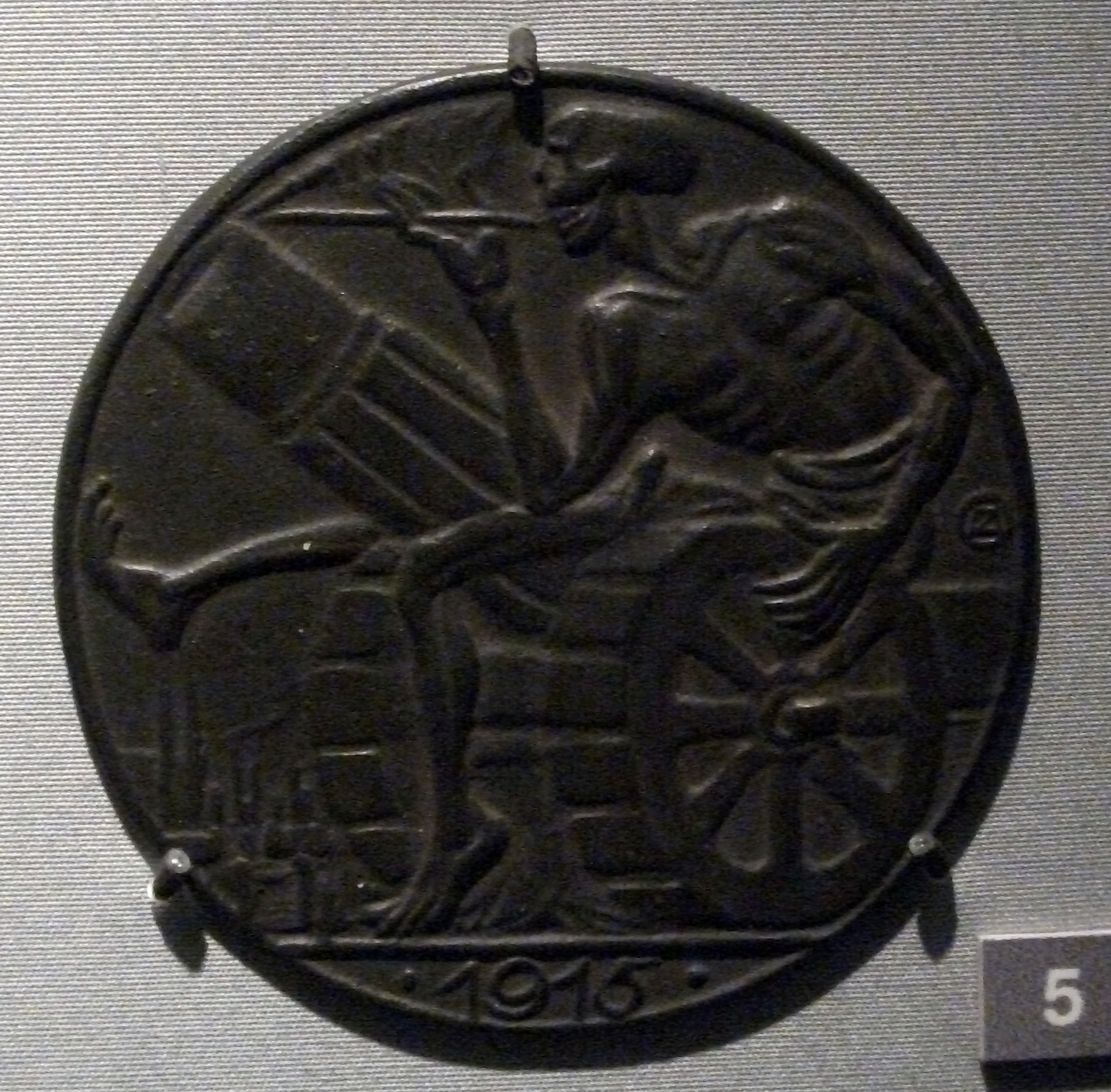
Death and the Cannon by Arnold Zadikow 1915, British Museum exhibition: "The other side of the medal: how Germany saw the First World War", 9 May – 23 November 2014

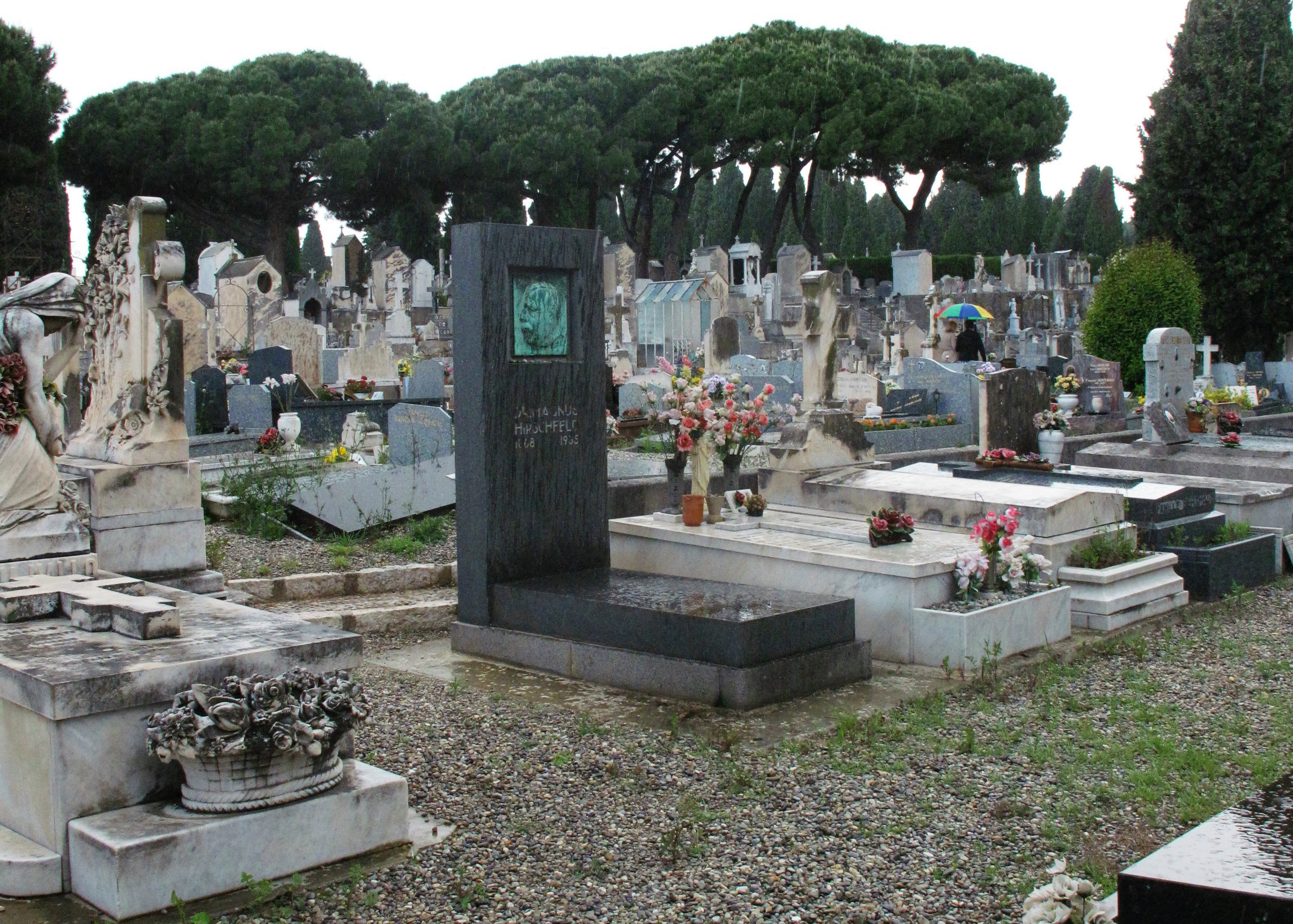
The headstone features a bronze bas-relief portrait of Hirschfeld in profile
