= Central Television =

Central Television may refer to:

- Central Digital Television, television stations in Australia
- Central GTS/BKN, television stations in Australia
- Central Luzon Television, television station in the Philippines
- China Central Television, state television station of China
- Fukushima Central Television, television stations in Japan
- ITV Central, formerly known as Central Independent Television, commercial television region and station in the United Kingdom
- Korean Central Television, state television station of the North Korea
- Soviet Central Television, state television of Soviet Union

== See also ==
- Central (TV channel), a Singaporean television channel
