= Raphael Wallfisch =

English cellist (born 1953)

- Wallfisch in 2021
- Born: 15 June 1953 (age 73); London, England, UK
- Occupation: Cellist
- Spouse: Elizabeth Wallfisch

Raphael Wallfisch (born 15 June 1953 in London) is an English cellist.

== Background ==
Wallfisch was born into a family of distinguished musicians; his father was the pianist Peter Wallfisch and his mother is the cellist Anita Lasker-Wallfisch, one of the last known surviving members of the Women's Orchestra of Auschwitz. He studied under teachers including Amaryllis Fleming, Derek Simpson and Gregor Piatigorsky, among others. He was educated at Latymer Upper School, Hammersmith.

== Career ==
Wallfisch is a prizewinner at the International Gaspar Cassadó Cello Competition in Florence, Italy. He has been appointed to the faculties of the Konservatorium Zürich Winterthur and the Musikhochschule Mainz.

He has recorded on the EMI, Chandos, Black Box, ASV, Naxos and Nimbus labels. He has made CD recordings of almost the entire cello repertoire, including works by Britten, Finzi, Leighton, Shostakovich, Bloch, Ravel, Busch, Schumann, Zemlinsky, and Tchaikovsky. His recordings span a wide range of British cello concertos, with works by MacMillan, Finzi, Delius, Walton, Bax, Bliss, Britten, Moeran, Coke, and Leighton.

== Family ==
His wife is the Australian Baroque violinist Elizabeth Wallfisch. His sister is the psychotherapist Maya Lasker-Wallfisch. He has three children, Benjamin (a conductor and Hollywood composer), Simon (baritone and cellist), and Joanna (a vocalist).
