= Peter Wallfisch =

British concert pianist

Hans Peter Wallfisch (20 October 1924 – 10 November 1993) was a concert pianist and teacher, resident in the United Kingdom from 1951 onwards.

== Life ==
Wallfisch was born in Breslau, Lower Silesia, in 1924. In 1938, he emigrated to Palestine; he studied at the Jerusalem Conservatoire, and was later a teacher there. In the late-1940s, he studied in Paris with Marguerite Long. In 1948, he won the first prize of the Béla Bartók Competition in Budapest.

In 1951, he moved to the United Kingdom, and married the cellist Anita Lasker the following year; they had a son, the cellist Raphael Wallfisch, and a daughter, the psychotherapist Maya Lasker-Wallfisch.

He performed in Europe and elsewhere. As well as the Classics, he was interested in lesser-known music of different nations; among English composers he was particularly interested in the music of Frank Bridge, and also of Kenneth Leighton, who dedicated compositions to him.

From 1973 to 1991 Wallfisch was professor of piano at the Royal College of Music. He suffered a stroke in 1991, which affected his ability to play, and he ceased performing in public. He died in London in 1993.
