= Simon Wallfisch =

British-German classical singer and cellist

Simon Wallfisch (born 22 May 1982) is a British-German classical singer and cellist.

== Life and career ==
Simon Joseph Lasker Wallfisch was born in London in 1982 to a family of professional musicians: his father is British cellist Raphael Wallfisch, his mother the Australian born baroque violinist Elizabeth Wallfisch. His grandparents are cellist Anita Lasker-Wallfisch and pianist Peter Wallfisch. His older brother is composer Benjamin Wallfisch, his younger sister is singer-songwriter Joanna Wallfisch.

=== Education ===
Between 2000 and 2006, Simon Wallfisch studied at the London Royal College of Music singing, violoncello and conducting. He continued his studies at Berlin's Hochschule für Musik Hanns Eisler Berlin 2006/07 and until 2009 at University of Music and Theatre Leipzig. During that period he sang as guest soloist at the Leipzig opera house, Theater Magdeburg, Anhaltisches Theater Dessau, Stadttheater Fürth and at the Theater Altenburg-Gera

=== Career ===
In 2013 he sang Escamillo in La tragédie de Carmen based on Bizet's Carmen with the Nederlandse Reisopera, in 2015 Albert in Jules Massenet’s Werther with the English Touring Opera, 2016 Marcello in Puccini's La Bohème with Orfeo InScena at the Teatro Verdi (Casciana Terme) in Pisa, and 2016/17 Fieramosca in Hector Berlioz’ Benvenuto Cellini as guest at Staatstheater Nürnberg. In concerts he sang Johann Sebastian Bach's Weihnachtsoratorium at the Brighton Early Music Festival in 2017 and Alexander Goehr's "after 'The Waking'" with the Nash Ensemble at London's Wigmore Hall

Wallfisch performed as cellist in the Holocaust Memorial Day programme on BBC Two in 2015. Wallfisch performed as a baritone in the Voices of Terezin on 27 January 2026 Holocaust Memorial Day at the Wigmore Hall in London.

== Discography ==
- 2014 – Geoffrey Bush Songs, with pianist Edward Rushton. Lyrita (SRCD343)
- 2015 – French Songs: from la belle époque to les années folles, with works by Caplet, Honegger, Milhaud and Ravel), with pianist Edward Rushton. Nimbus Records (NI5938)
- 2018 – Gesänge des Orients, with pianist Edward Rushton. Nimbus Records (NI5971)
- 2019 – Robert Schumann: Songs of Love and Death, with pianist Edward Rushton. Resonus Classics (RES10247)
- 2020 – Johannes Brahms: Songs of Loss and Betrayal, with pianist Edward Rushton. Resonus Classics (RES10258)

== Activism ==
Wallfisch is an activist against antisemitism. He gives talks and tells his family's history in schools, and accompanies his grandmother Anita Lasker-Wallfisch, who is a frequent guest in talkshows and interviews. He is a trustee of the International Centre for Suppressed Music (ICSM), and performed works by "classical composers who were stopped from working, forced into exile or killed by the Nazis."
