= Elizabeth Wallfisch =

Australian musician

Elizabeth Wallfisch (née Hunt; born 28 January 1952) is an Australian Baroque violinist.

== Biography ==
Born in Melbourne, Wallfisch debuted as a concert soloist at the age of 12 and took part in such competitions as the ABC Concerto Competition. She was educated at St Catherine's School, Toorak in Melbourne, leaving in 1969. She studied at the Royal Academy of Music under Frederick Grinke and was awarded, among other prizes, the President's Prize. At the age of 20 she won the Franco Gulli Senior Prize for violin, and was jointly awarded the Mozart Memorial Prize.

In 1974, Wallfisch won the prize for most outstanding performance of Johann Sebastian Bach in the Carl Flesch Competition. She began to perform with orchestras such as the London Mozart Players and the Royal Liverpool Philharmonic Orchestra in England, establishing herself as a concert performer in the UK.

She developed a reputation as a specialist Baroque violinist. Playing on a period instrument, Wallfisch has recorded and performed many Baroque works, well-known and obscure, from Vivaldi's The Four Seasons to a collection of Telemann's Violin Concertos (6 CDs, CPO) to the Pietro Locatelli Violin Concertos, Op. 3.

In 1989, she co-founded The Locatelli Trio (since renamed Convivium), along with Richard Tunnicliffe (cello) and Paul Nicholson (harpsichord). This ensemble records and performs less well-known works from the Baroque, including violin sonatas by Locatelli, Corelli and Tartini.

Wallfisch has led many diverse ensembles and orchestras around the world; these include the Orchestra of the Age of Enlightenment, the Hanover Band and the Raglan Baroque Players. In her home country of Australia, she has led such ensembles as the Australian Chamber Orchestra and the Australian Brandenburg Orchestra.

Academic positions, past and present, held by Wallfisch include Professor of Baroque Violin at the Royal Conservatoire in The Hague, teaching at the Royal Academy of Music in London, and artist-in-residence at the University of Melbourne.

== Personal life ==
Wallfisch is married to the British cellist Raphael Wallfisch. Their three children are producer of film scores and Academy-member Benjamin Wallfisch, cellist and baritone Simon Wallfisch, and singer-songwriter Joanna Wallfisch. Elizabeth Wallfisch is the granddaughter of the British conductor Albert Coates, daughter of British oboist Tamara Coates, twin sister of the late Australian-Canadian cellist Tanya Prochazka, and step-daughter of cellist Marianne Hunt.

== Accolades ==
In 2021 she received the Telemann Prize by the city of Magdeburg.
