= Geoffrey Bush =

British musician and scholar (1920–1998)

- Born: Geoffrey Bush; 23 March 1920; London, England
- Died: 24 February 1998 (aged 77); London, England
- Occupations: Composer, teacher and music scholar

Geoffrey Bush (23 March 1920 – 24 February 1998) was a British composer, teacher and music scholar. Largely without formal training in composition, he produced a wide range of compositions across different genres, including many songs and works for choirs. He also edited and arranged the works of other composers. Most of his teaching was within the framework of the Extramural Departments at Oxford University and London University. He was a popular broadcaster on BBC music programmes, and the author of several books.

== Life ==
=== Early life ===
Bush was born in Kilburn, London, on 23 March 1920, the son of Christopher Bush, a schoolmaster and writer, and his wife Winifred, née Chart (John Warrack's ODNB biography gives the father's forenames as "Charles Christmas"). Bush's parents separated at around the time of his birth, and he never knew his father. He began piano lessons at the age of seven, and the following year became a chorister at Salisbury Cathedral choir school, where he remained until 1933, studying under Walter Alcock and acquiring a lasting love of traditional English church music. He began composing at the age of ten. In 1933 he went to Lancing College, where his early compositional efforts were subject to harsh criticism; this led him to destroy his early works, an action that he later regretted.

While at Lancing, Bush met the composer John Ireland, who gave him lessons in composition; the association would last until Ireland's death in 1962. Encouraged by Ireland, Bush entered Balliol College, Oxford in 1938, on a Nettleship scholarship. He took his B.Mus degree in 1940, but his Oxford studies were then interrupted by the Second World War As a pacifist and conscientious objector, Bush served between 1941 and 1945 as assistant warden in the Hostel of the Good Shepherd, a children's home in Tredegar, Wales. During this period he composed a considerable number of works, including his first attempt at opera, The Spanish Rivals, later withdrawn. He returned to Oxford in 1945, where in 1946 he took an MA degree in Classics, and a D.Mus.

=== Career ===
Bush began his teaching career in 1947, as an extramural lecturer at Oxford. In 1952 he transferred to the Extramural Department at London University where over the following 40 years he fulfilled various roles, including that of Senior Staff Tutor from 1964 to 1980. He was largely responsible for the development of the London University External Diploma in the History of Music. He was also a visiting professor at King's College, London from 1969 to 1989, and was made a Fellow of University College, Wales in 1986. Bush served on a number of public bodies, including the Composers Guild of Great Britain, where he was the Guild's delegate on a visit to the USSR in 1964, the Performing Rights Society, and the Arts Council. He was musical adviser to the John Ireland Charitable Trust. Bush maintained his pacifist credentials, as a supporter of the Campaign for Nuclear Disarmament (CND), and the Anglican Pacifist Fellowship. These interests were reflected in his short opera The Equation (1967).

Alongside his teaching, Bush composed a large number of works, including orchestral pieces, operas, choruses and songs. His "Yorick" Overture was awarded the Royal Philharmonic Society's prize in 1949. He wrote two symphonies in the 1950s, the first of which was first performed at the 1954 Cheltenham Festival, and at the Proms in 1958. His Second Symphony was commissioned by the city of Guildford for the 700th anniversary of the city's foundation. Bush edited volumes of songs by Hubert Parry and Stanford, and provided the orchestration for Stanford's Third Piano Concerto. His writings included several published books, including Musical Creation and the Listener (1954); Left, Right and Centre (1983); and An Uncertain Education (1990). He edited several editions of Musica Britannica, and was a regular and popular broadcaster of BBC music programmes.

In April 1950 he married Julia McKenna; the marriage produced two sons. Bush was a polished pianist, and was organist at St Luke's Church, Chelsea, where he succeeded Ireland. Outside the world of music, Bush was a keen student of detective fiction, and collaborated with his fellow-composer Bruce Montgomery (who wrote under the name Edmund Crispin) on a story "Who Killed Baker?". Bush's 70th birthday in 1990 was marked by a "Celebration of English Song", held at London's Wigmore Hall. He died in London on 24 February 1998.

== Music ==
Bush composed across a wide variety of genres, including orchestral, chamber and keyboard works, choral works for accompanied and accompanied choirs, operas, and many songs with either piano or instrumental accompaniment. He was happiest writing songs and operas, although he deemed song-writing as a "futile" occupation: "[I[t is distinctly discouraging for a composer who has written (as I have) nearly a dozen cycles to find, far from having sung them, most singers do not even know they exist". Many of his songs are settings of classical verse, from Chaucer, Shakespeare, Robert Herrick, Ben Jonson and Shelley, although he also set more modern poets such as Stevie Smith and Kathleen Raine.

A scholar of Elizabethan and Victorian music, Bush composed largely in the English tradition; his operas, and some of his later songs, reflect the influences of Purcell and Britten. He was not averse to the adoption of other idioms – in his First Symphony he included a blues-style slow movement, as a tribute to his friend and fellow-composer Constant Lambert. Malcolm Miller, in his summary of the composer's work for Grove Music Online, writes: "His insights into Elizabethan polyphony and 19th-century harmony infuse his many transcriptions and Stravinskian arrangements, while his music’s chromaticism, within a broadly tonal idiom, its love of counterpoint and its delicate, colourful orchestration betray the influences of Prokofiev."

== Recordings ==
Recordings are available for a significant proportion of Bush's compositions; several discs have been released that are devoted entirely to his works, while various individual songs and other items can be found in assorted albums devoted to English music. Major recorded works include both symphonies, the Yorick Overture, the Christmas Cantata, the opera Lord Arthur Savile's Crime and the Oboe Concerto.
