= Joanna Wallfisch =

British-Australian singer and songwriter

Joanna Wallfisch (born 1985 in London) is a British-Australian singer-songwriter and jazz singer.

== Life and career ==
Wallfisch grew up in London in a musical family. Her father Raphael Wallfisch is a British cellist, her mother Elizabeth Wallfisch an Australian baroque violinist, her brothers are film composer Benjamin Wallfisch and opera singer Simon Wallfisch. She studied fine arts at Central Saint Martins College of Art and Design and Beaux-Arts de Paris, and received a master of music in jazz performance from Guildhall School of Music and Drama in 2011. In the same year she self published her debut album Wild Swan and moved to New York, where she collaborated with Sam Newsome, and Dan Tepfer. Wallfisch released the albums The Origin of Adjustable Things in 2015 and Gardens in My Mind in 2016, and performed 16 solo shows on a bicycle tour from Portland to Santa Monica, subject of her book The Great Song Cycle. In 2020 Wallfisch released her 40 minute documentary The Great Song Cycle, Down Under about another bicycle tour in Australia, crowdfunded with $5,424. It was shown at the Flathead Lake International Cinemafest in Polson in 2021. In September 2022 Wallfisch premiered her song The Ship live on a tv morning show. Wallfisch teaches songwriting at a private music school in Pasadena, and offers music education for children. She holds European and Australian passports.

== Publications ==
=== Recordings ===
- 2006: Benjamin Wallfisch – Dear Wendy (Original Motion Picture Score). Joanna Wallfisch, vocals. MovieScore Media (MMS 06004)
- 2011: Wild Swan, Bandcamp, self published
- 2015: Joanna Wallfisch With Dan Tepfer – The Origin Of Adjustable Things. Sunnyside Records (SSC 1405)
- 2015: song Satelite on Benjamin Wallfisch – Pressure (Original Motion Picture Soundtrack). MovieScore Media (MMS 15025)
- 2016: Gardens in my Mind. Sunnyside (SSC 1455)
- 2017: Blood & Bone. Sea Gardens Publishing (001)
- 2019: Far away from any place called home. Bandcamp, self published.
- 2022: session vocals for song Dawn FM on Dawn FM by The Weeknd. Republic Records (00602445021154)

=== Bibliography ===
- 2019: The Great Song Cycle ISBN 978-1-76080-095-6

=== Filmography ===
- 2020: The Great Song Cycle, Down Under
