= Peddler =

Door-to-door salesperson

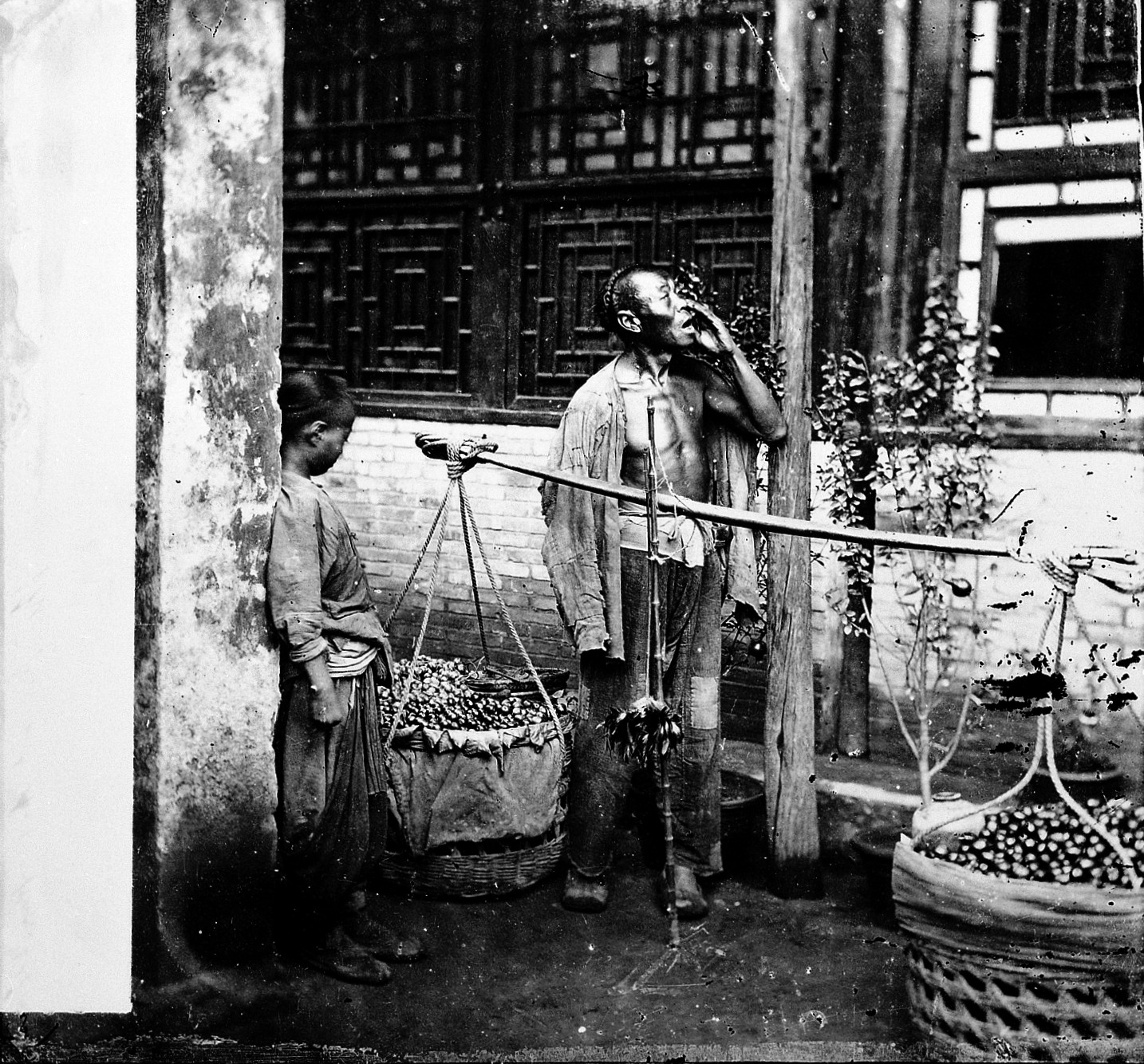
A Peking fruit seller, c. 1869

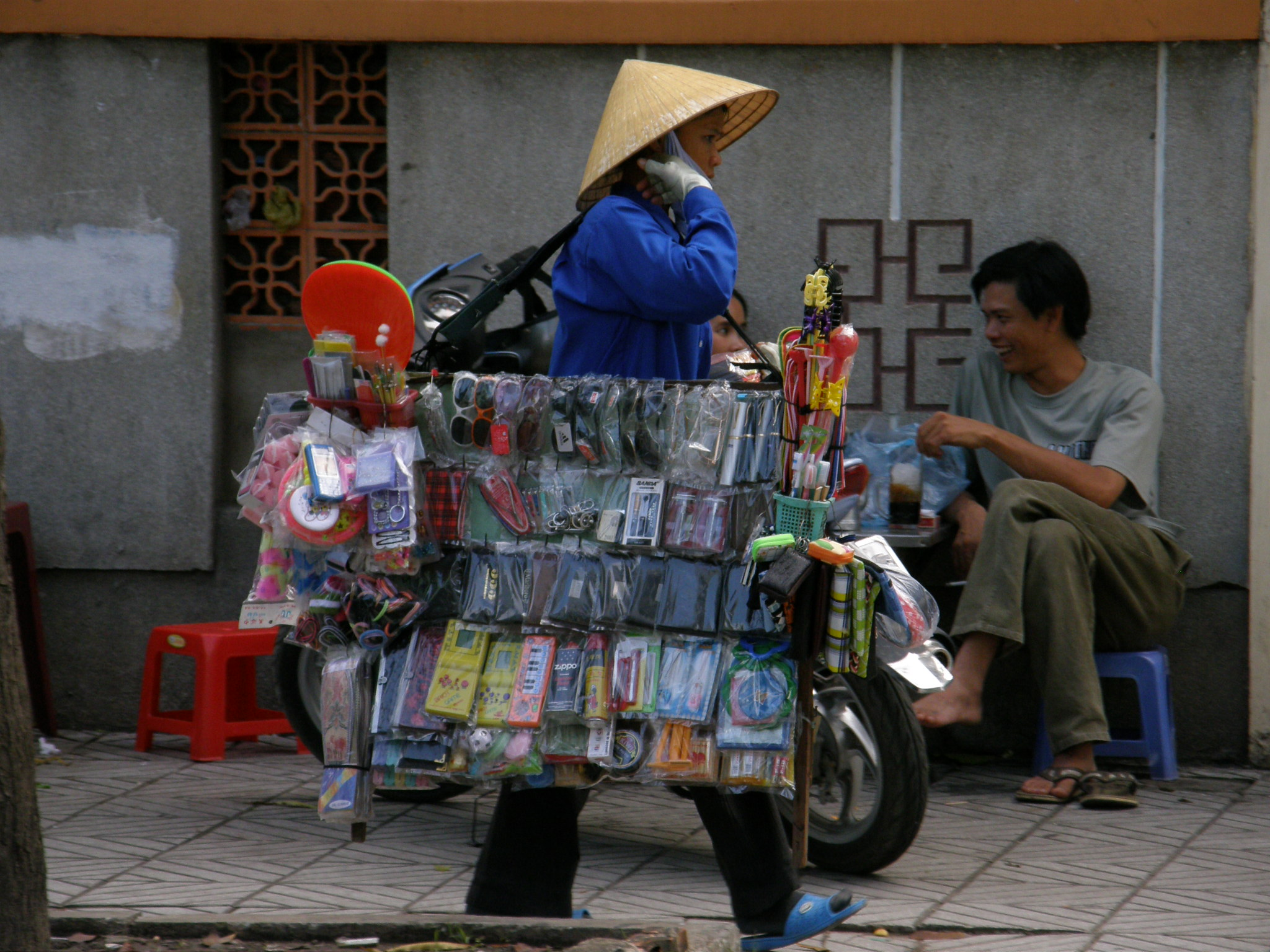
Peddler in Ho Chi Minh City, Vietnam

A peddler (American English) or pedlar (British English) (Note: Also known as a chapman, packman, cheapjack, hawker, higler, huckster, colporteur or solicitor (but not in Britain)) is a door-to-door and/or traveling vendor of goods. In 19th-century United States the word "drummer" was often used to refer to a peddler or traveling salesman; as exemplified in the popular play Sam'l of Posen; or, The Commercial Drummer by George H. Jessop.

In England, the term was mostly used for travelers hawking goods in the countryside to small towns and villages.

From antiquity, peddlers filled the gaps in the formal market economy by providing consumers with the convenience of door-to-door service. They operated alongside town markets and fairs where they often purchased surplus stocks which were subsequently resold to consumers. Peddlers were able to distribute goods to the more geographically-isolated communities such as those who lived in mountainous regions of Europe. They also called on consumers who, for whatever reason, found it difficult to attend town markets. Thus, peddlers played an important role in linking these consumers and regions to wider trade routes. Some peddlers worked as agents or traveling salesmen for larger manufacturers and so were the precursor to the modern traveling salesman.

Images of peddlers feature in literature and art from as early as the 12th century. Such images were very popular with the genre and Orientalist painters and photographers of the 18th and the 19th centuries. Some imagery depicts peddlers in a pejorative manner, and others portray idealized romantic visions of peddlers at work.

== Etymology and definitions ==
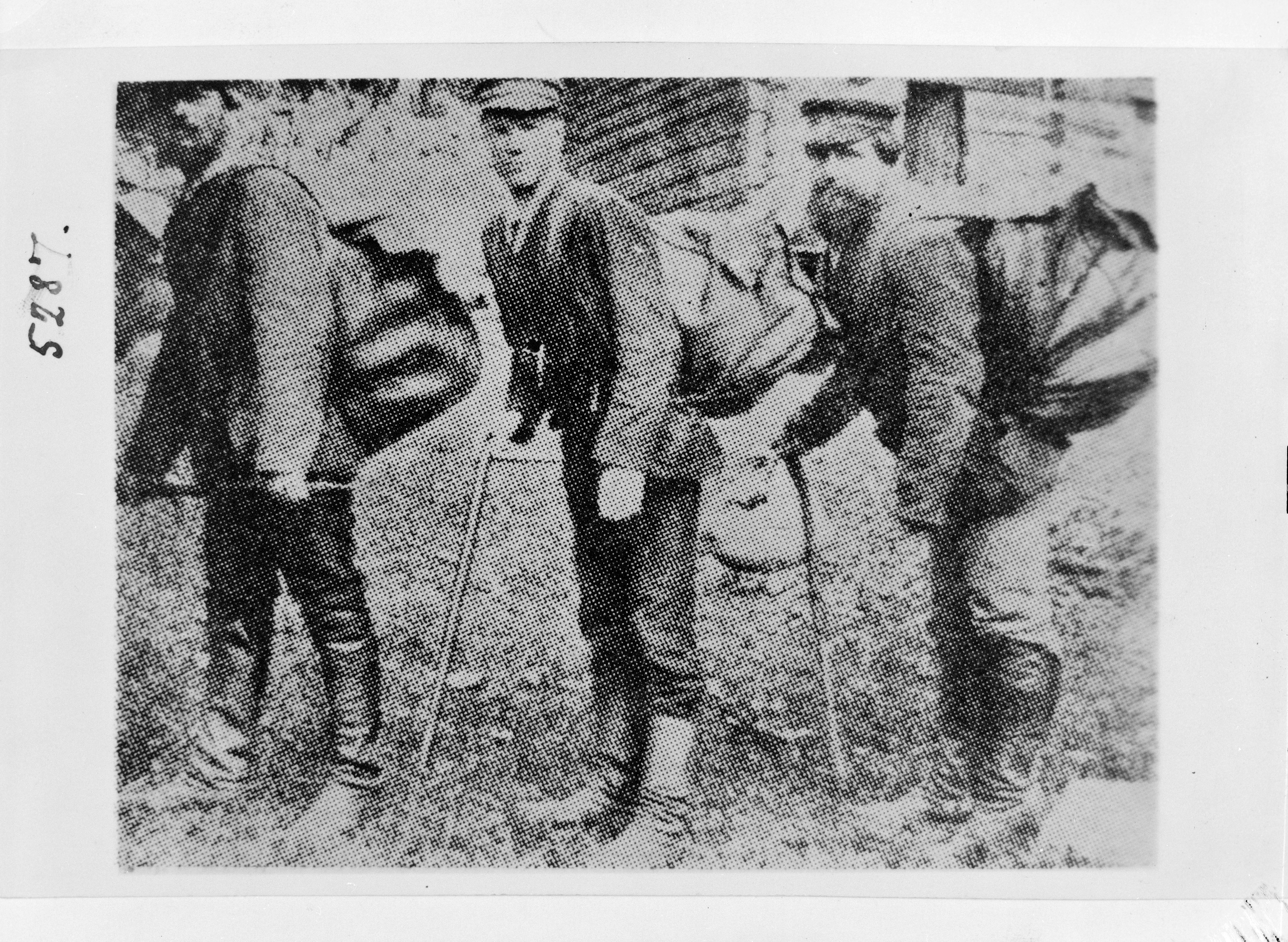
Three East Karelian "laukkuryssä" peddlers from Kestenga, Russia in Lohja, Finland in the late 19th century.

The origin of the word, known in English since 1225, is uncertain, but is possibly an Anglicized version of the French pied, Latin pes, pedis "foot", referring to a petty trader traveling on foot.

A peddler, under English law, is defined as: "any hawker, pedlar, petty chapman, tinker, caster of metals, mender of chairs, or other person who, without any horse or other beast bearing or drawing burden, travels and trades on foot and goes from town to town or to other men's houses, carrying to sell or exposing for sale any goods, wares, or merchandise immediately to be delivered, or selling or offering for sale his skill in handicraft." The main distinction between peddlers and other types of street vendor is that peddlers travel as they trade, rather than travel to a fixed place of trade. Peddlers travel around and approach potential customers directly whereas street traders set up a pitch or a stall and wait for customers to approach them. When not actually engaged in selling, peddlers are required to keep moving. Although peddlers may stop to make a sale, they are precluded from setting up a pitch or remaining in the same place for lengthy periods. Although peddlers normally travel by foot, there is no reason why they cannot use some means of assistance, such as a cart or a trolley, to assist in the transportation of goods.

== History ==
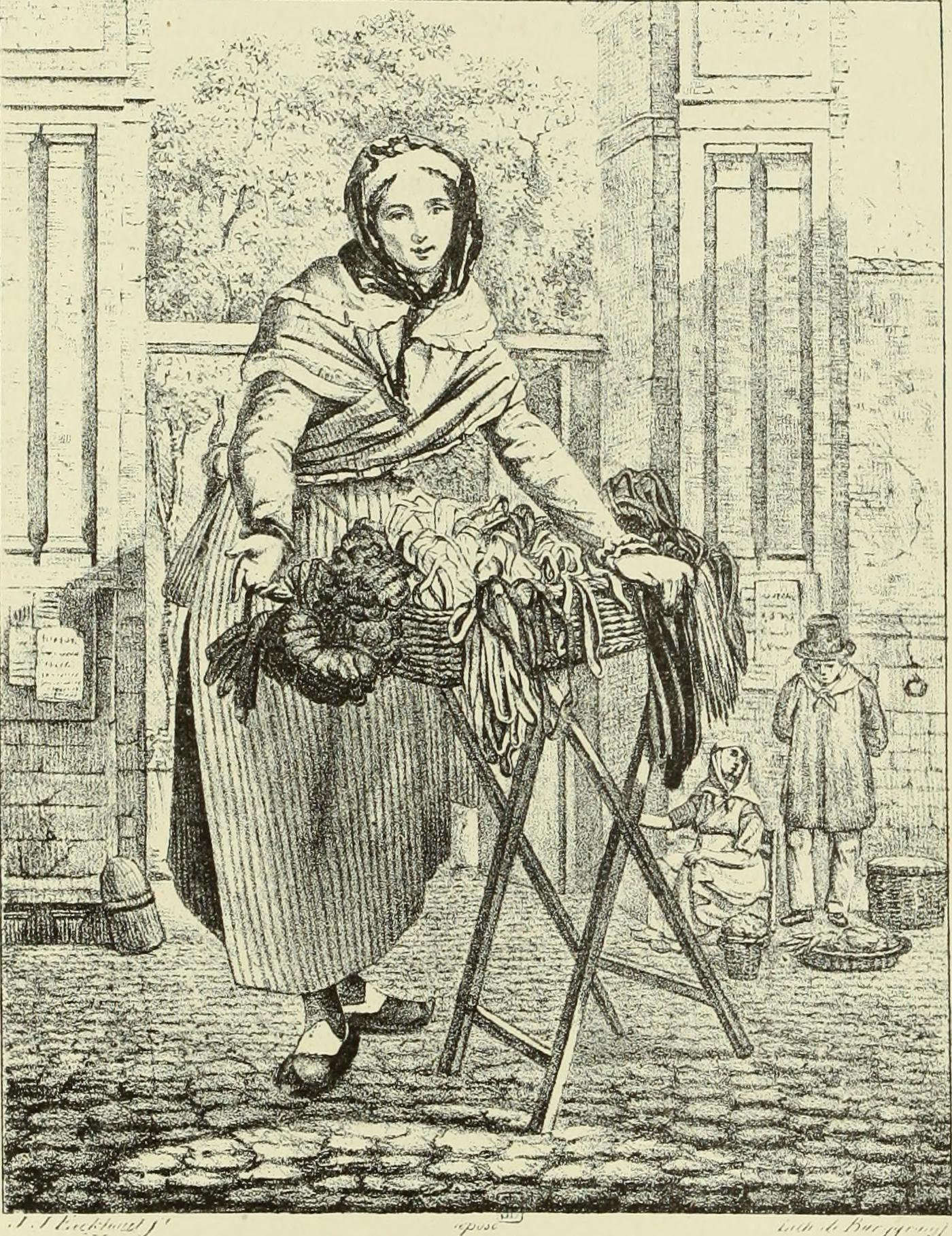
Ribbon seller at the entrance to the Butter Market, engraving by J.J. Eeckhout, 1884

Peddlers have been known since antiquity. They were known by a variety of names throughout the ages, including Arabber, hawker, chapman (medieval English), huckster, itinerant vendor or street vendor. According to marketing historian, Eric Shaw, the peddler is "perhaps the only substantiated type of retail marketing practice that evolved from Neolithic times to the present." The political philosopher John Stuart Mill wrote that "even before the resources of society permitted the establishment of shops, the supply of [consumer] wants fell universally into the hands of itinerant dealers, the pedlars who might appear once a month, being preferred to the fair, which only returned once a year."

Typically, peddlers operated door-to-door, plied the streets or stationed themselves at the fringes of formal trade venues such as open air markets or fairs. In the Greco-Roman world, open-air markets served urban customers, while peddlers filled in the gaps in distribution by selling to rural or geographically distant customers.

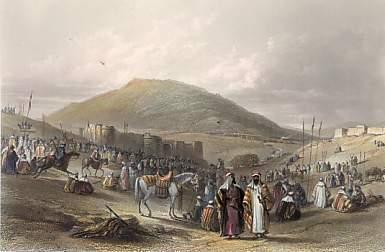
At Khan Al-Tujjar: At the Arab fair, the peddlers open their packages of tempting fabrics; the jeweler is there with his trinkets; the tailor with his ready-made garments; the shoe-maker with his stock, from rough, hairy sandals to yellow and red morocco boots; the farrier is there with his tools, nails, and flat iron shoes, and drives a prosperous business for a few hours; and so does the saddler, with his coarsesacks and his gayly-trimmed cloths.

In the Bible the term 'peddler' was used to describe those who spread the word of God for profit. The book of 2 Corinthians has the following phrase, "For we are not as so many, peddling the word of God" (2 Corinthians 2:17). The Greek term translated "peddling" referred to small-scale merchants who profited from acting as middlemen between others. The Apocrypha has the following, "A merchant shall hardly keep himself from doing wrong; and an huckster shall not be freed from sin" (Ecclesiasticus 26:29).

In some economies the work of itinerant selling was left to a greater or lesser extent to nomadic minorities, such as gypsies, travelers, or Yeniche who offered a varied assortment of goods and services, both evergreens and (notoriously suspicious) novelties. In 19th-century USA, peddling was often the occupation of immigrant communities including Italians, Greeks and Jews. The more colorful peddlers were those who doubled as performers, healers, or fortune-tellers.

Historically, peddlers used a variety of different transport modes: they traveled by foot, carrying their wares; by means of a person or animal-drawn cart or wagon or used improvised carrying devices. Abram Goodman, who took to peddling in the US in the 1840s, reports that he traveled by foot, used a sleigh when roads were snowbound and also traveled, with his pack, by boat when traversing longer distances.

As market towns flourished in medieval Europe, peddlers found a role operating on the fringes of the formal economy. During this time it was common to see long-distance peddlers, who sold remedies, potions and elixirs. They called directly on homes, delivering produce to the door thereby saving customers time traveling to markets or fairs. However, customers paid a higher price for this convenience. Some peddlers operated out of inns or taverns, where they often acted as an agent rather than a reseller.

Peddlers played an important role providing services to geographically isolated districts, such as in the mountainous regions of Europe, thereby linking these districts with wider trading routes.

A 16th-century commentator wrote of the:

many pedlars and chapmen, that from fair to fair, from markett to markett, carieth it to sell in horspakks and fote pakks, in basketts and budgelts, sitting on holydays and sondais in chirche porchis and abbeys dayly to sell all such trifells.

By the 18th-century, some peddlers worked for industrial producers, where they acted as a type of traveling sales representative. In England, these peddlers were known as "Manchester men." Employed by a factory or entrepreneur, they sold goods from shop to shop rather than door to door and were thus operating as a type of wholesaler or distribution intermediary. They were the precursors to the modern sales representative. An attempt by Pitt the Younger in 1785 to buy off opposition to a tax on shopkeepers almost led to peddlers in England being banned. Moreover, anti-semitism in eighteenth and nineteenth century England led to negative images of Jewish peddlers.

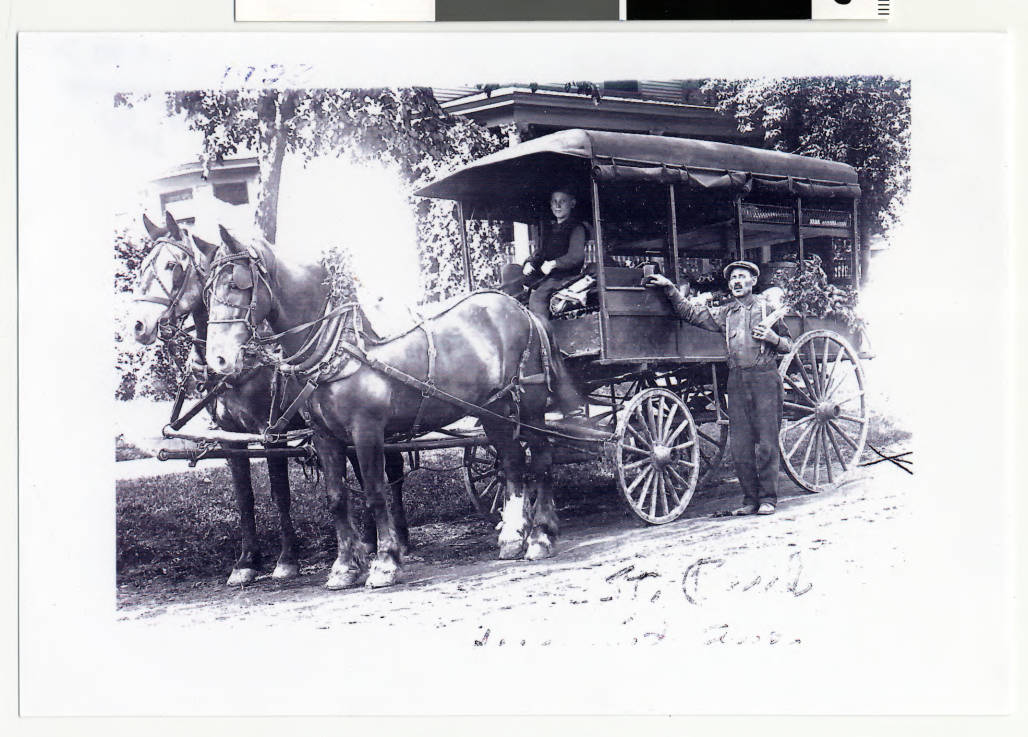
Fruit peddlers with draft horses and covered wagon, Saint Paul, Minnesota, c. 1928

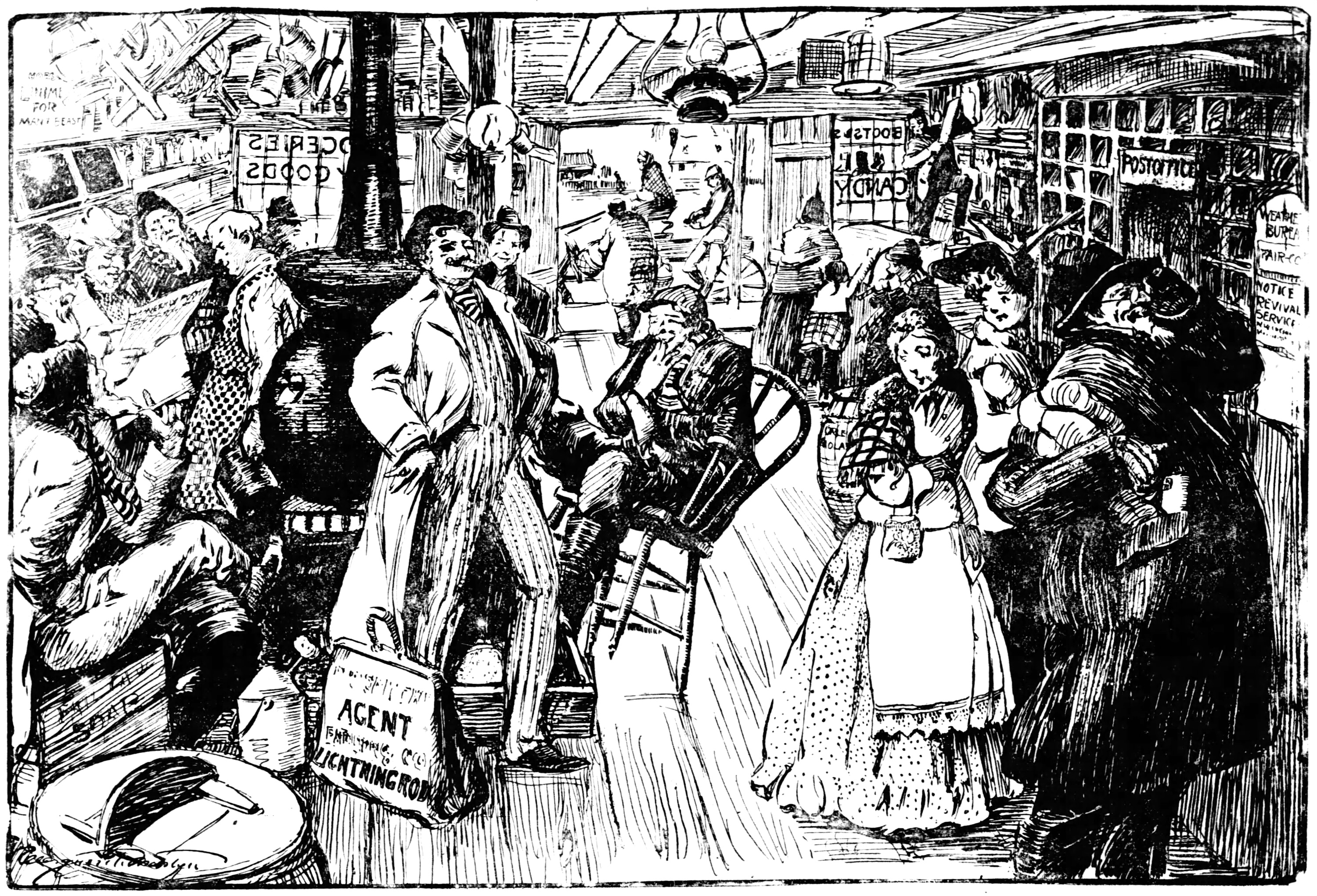
Fanciful drawing by Marguerite Martyn in the St. Louis Post-Dispatch of October 21, 1906, featuring the image of a travelling salesman of lightning rods, in the striped suit

In the United States, there was an upsurge in the number of peddlers in the late 18th century and this may have peaked in the decades just before the American Civil War. However, their numbers began to decline by the 19th century. Advances in industrial mass production and freight transportation as a result of the war laid the groundwork for the beginnings of modern retail and distribution networks, which gradually eroded much of the need for travelling salesmen. The rise of popular Mail order catalogues (e.g. Montgomery Ward began in 1872) offered another way for people in rural or other remote areas to obtain items not readily available in local stores or markets. A relatively short-lived upsurge in the number of peddlers was witnessed in the period following the Second World War, when the wartime manufacturing boom came to an abrupt end, and returning soldiers finding themselves unable to secure suitable work, turned to peddling which generally offered a decent income.

In the United States the traveling salesman became a stock character in countless jokes. Such jokes are typically bawdy, and usually feature small town rubes, farmers and other country folk, and frequently another stock character, the farmer's daughter.

Throughout much of Europe, suspicions of dishonest or petty criminal activity was long associated with peddlers and travelers. Regulations to discourage small-scale retailing by hawkers and peddlers, promulgated by English authorities in the 15th and 16th centuries and reinforced by the Church, did much to encourage stereotypical and negative attitudes towards peddlers. From the 16th century, peddlers were often associated with pejorative perceptions, many of which persisted until well into the 19th and 20th centuries.

In the modern economy a new breed of peddler, generally encouraged to dress respectably to inspire confidence with the general public, has been sent into the field as an aggressive form of direct marketing by companies pushing their specific products, sometimes to help launch novelties, sometimes on a permanent basis. In a few cases this has even been used as the core of a business.

== Life of a peddler ==
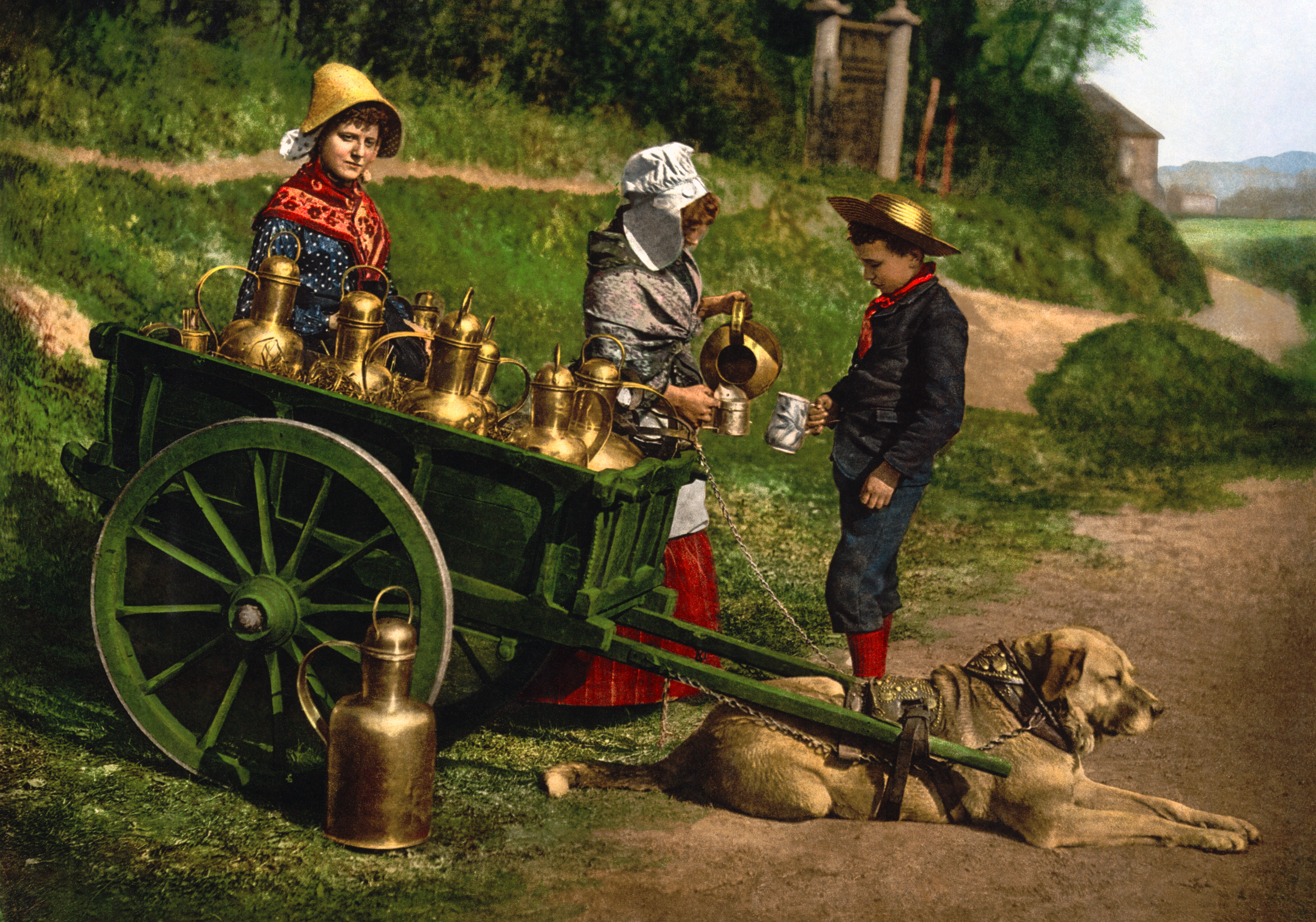
Belgian milk peddlers with a dog-drawn cart, c. 1890–1900

Very few peddlers left written records. Many were illiterate and diaries are rare. Most peddlers handled cash transactions leaving behind few or no accounting records such as receipts, invoices or day-books. However, a very small number of peddlers kept diaries and these can be used to provide an insight into the daily life of a peddler. Ephraim Lisitzky (1885–1962), an immigrant from Russia, arrived in the US in 1900 and took up peddling for a brief period following his arrival. His autobiography, published in 1959 under the title, In the Grip of the Cross-Currents, describes his various encounters with householders and the difficulties he experienced making a sale as door after door was slammed in his face.

After arriving in America in 1842, Abram Vossen Goodman also maintained a diary of his experiences, which has been published by the American Jewish Archives. Excerpts from the diary detail his experiences and thoughts about the life of a peddler. When Goodman's initial attempts to find employment as a clerk were unsuccessful, he wrote on September 29, "I had to do as all the others; with a bundle on my back I had to go out into the country, peddling various articles." (p. 95) In the first few weeks, he found the lifestyle onerous, uncertain and solitary.

"Can a man, in fact, be said to be "living" as he plods through the vast, remote country, uncertain even as to which farmer will provide him shelter for the coming night? In such an existence the single man gets along far better than the father of a family. Such fools as are married not only suffer themselves, but bring suffering to their women. How must an educated woman feel when, after a brief stay at home, her supporter and shelterer leaves with his pack on his back, not knowing where he will find lodging on the next night or the night after?" (p.96)

"Last week in the vicinity of Plymouth I met two peddlers, Lehman and Marx. Marx knew me from Furth, and that night we stayed together at a farmer's house. After supper we started singing, and I sat at the fireplace, thinking of all my past and of my family." (p.100)

[By October,1842 Goodman is travelling with a brother] "Not far from [Lunenburg] we were forced to stop on Wednesday because of the heavy snow. We sought to spend the night with a cooper, a Mr. Spaulding, but his wife did not wish to take us in. She was afraid of strangers, she might not sleep well; we should go our way. And outside there raged the worst blizzard I have ever seen... After we had talked to this woman for half an hour, after repeatedly pointing out that to turn us forth into the blizzard would be sinful, we were allowed to stay." (p.101)

"On Monday morning, December 5th, we set out for Groton in a sleigh and at night stayed with an old farmer, about two miles from that place. It was a very satisfactory business day, and we took in about fifteen dollars... After spending Wednesday in Milford, we traveled beyond on Thursday and Friday, spending Saturday at Amherst and Sunday at the home of Mr. Kendall in Mount Vernon. Business, thanks be to God, is satisfactory, and this week we took in more than forty-five dollars. (p. 103)

"It is hard, very hard indeed, to make a living this way. Sweat runs down my body in great drops and my back seems to be breaking, but I cannot stop; I must go on and on, however far my way lies...Times are bad; everywhere there is no money. This increases the hardship of life so that I am sometimes tempted to return to New York and to start all over again. (pp 107-108)

== Modes of transport ==
Today, peddlers continue to travel by foot. However, they also use bicycle, hand-held carts, horse-drawn carts or drays and motorized vehicles such as motor-bikes as transport modes. To carry their wares, peddlers use purpose-built back-packs, barrows, hand-carts or improvised carrying baskets. Rickshaw peddlers are a relatively common sight across Asia.

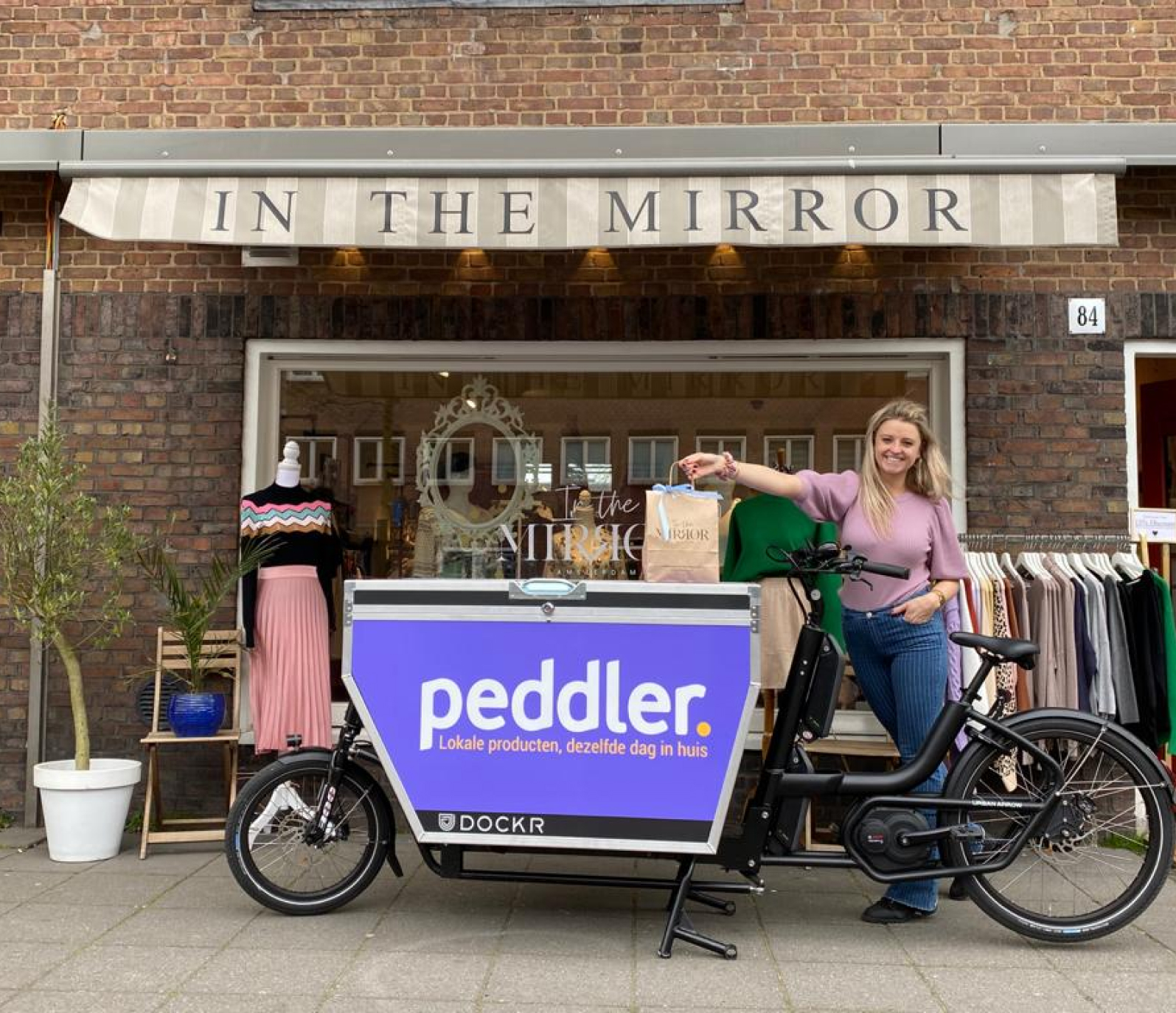
Modern-day pedal-powered peddler in Amsterdam, Netherlands, c. 2020

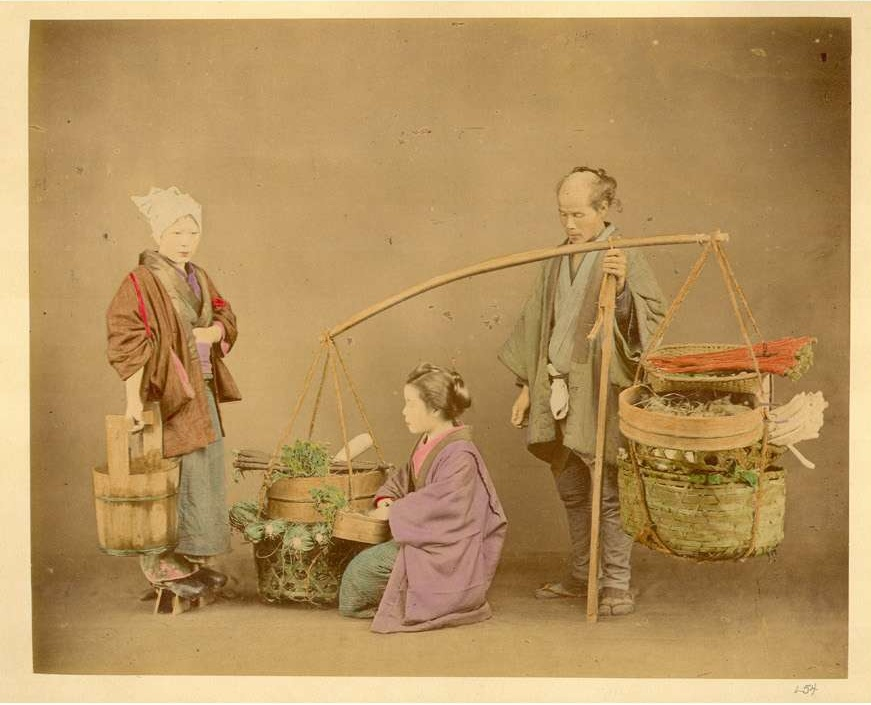
Vegetable peddler, Japan, 19th-century

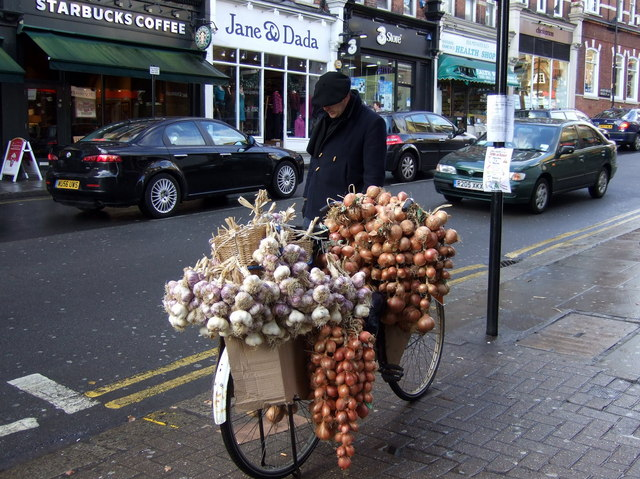
Cycle-mounted Breton onion salesmen were a familiar sight across southern England and Wales

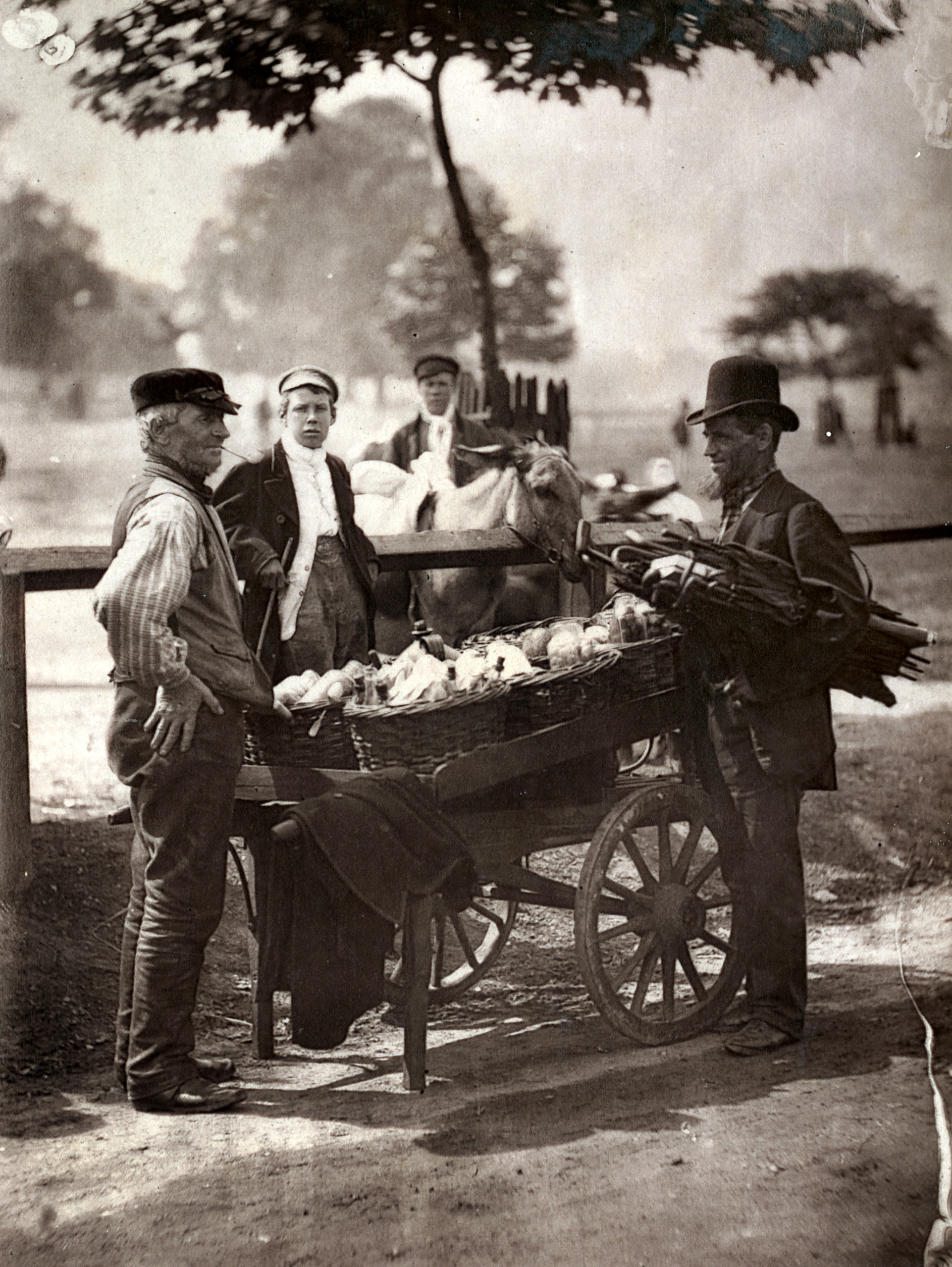
"Mush-Fakers" and Ginger-Beer Makers, London, circa 1877

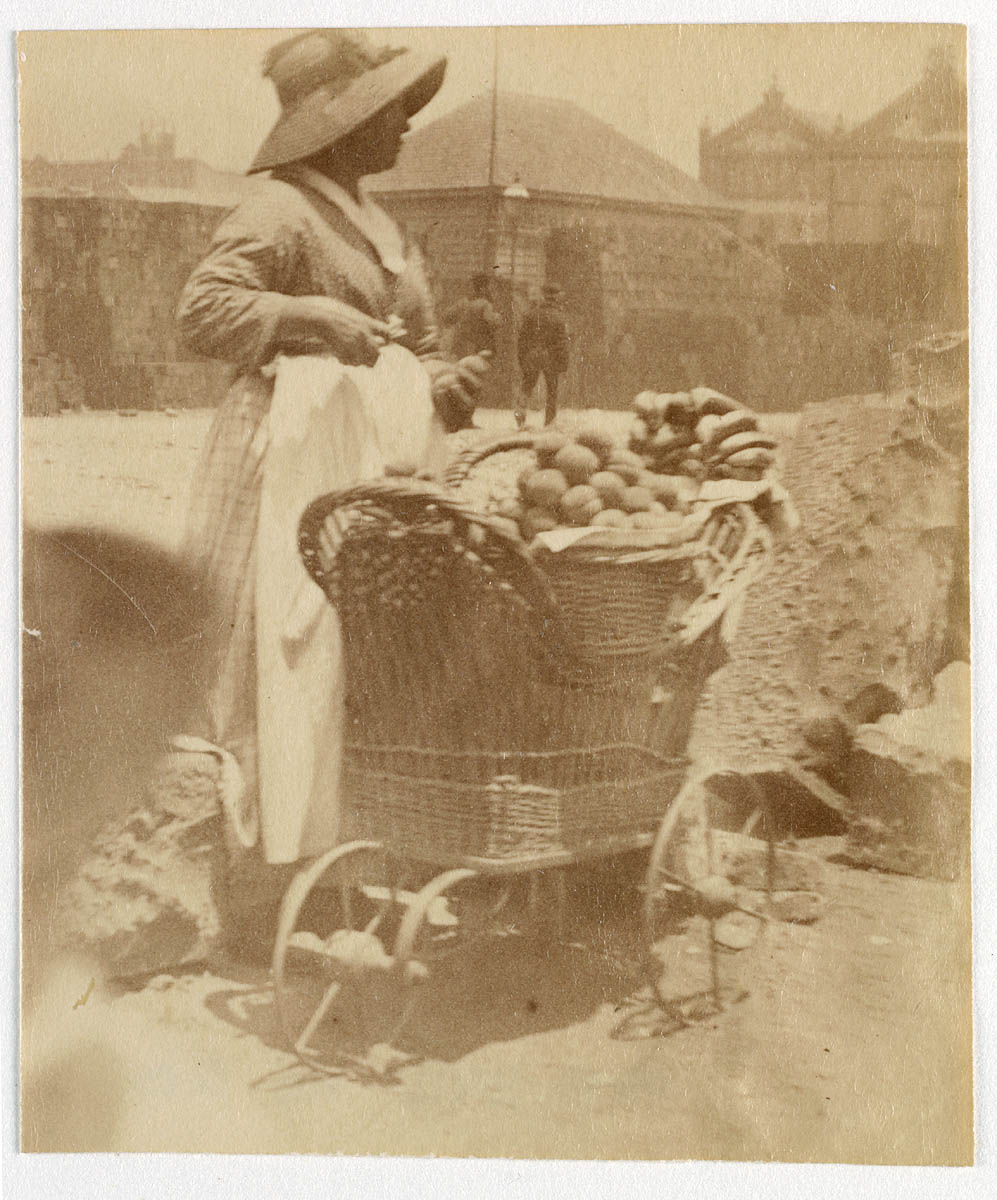
Fruit peddler and barrow, Sydney, circa 1885

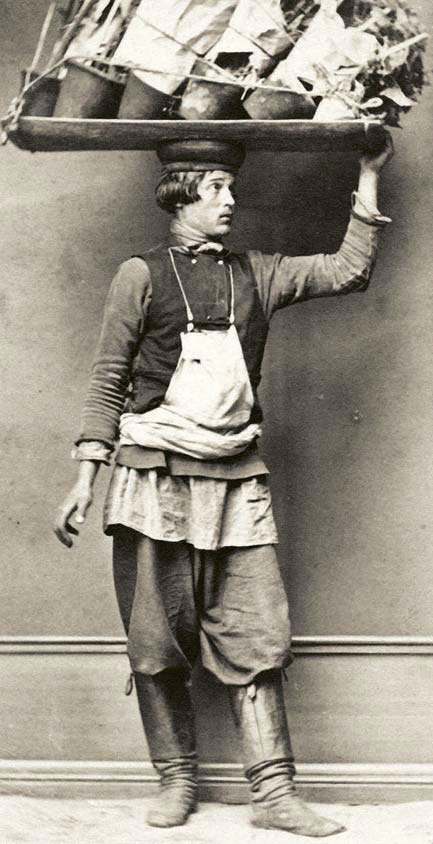
Peddler from Russia, circa 1900s

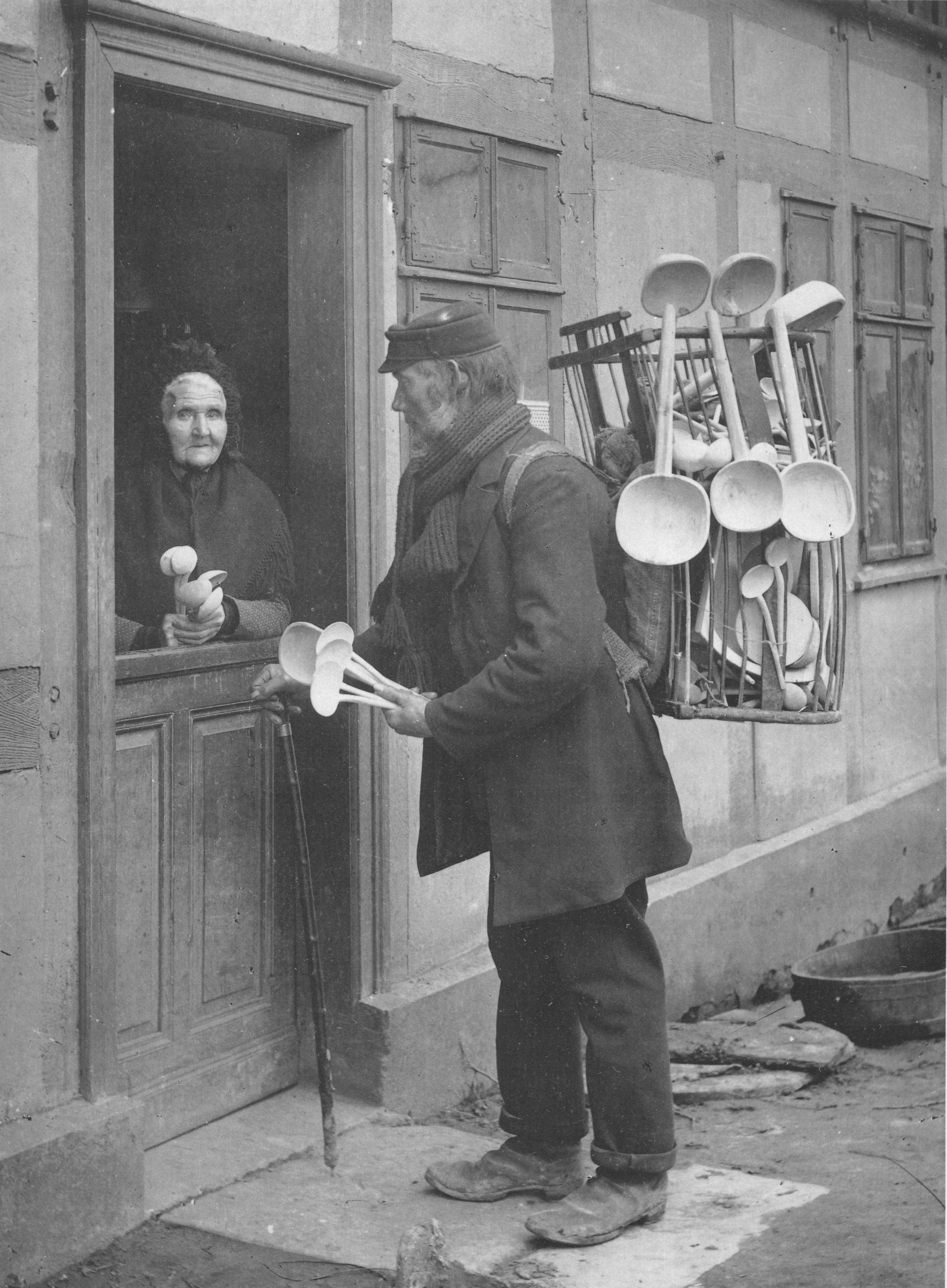
A door-to-door peddler, 1905

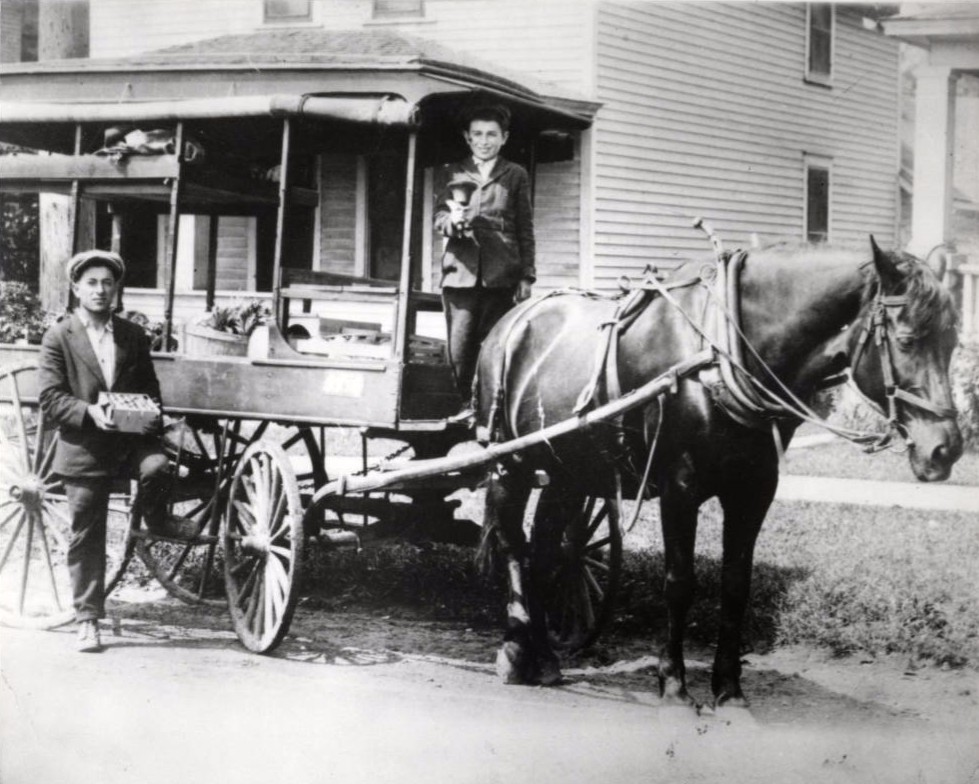
David and Harry Silverman in their fruit-peddling cart, Saint Paul, Minnesota, c. 1920

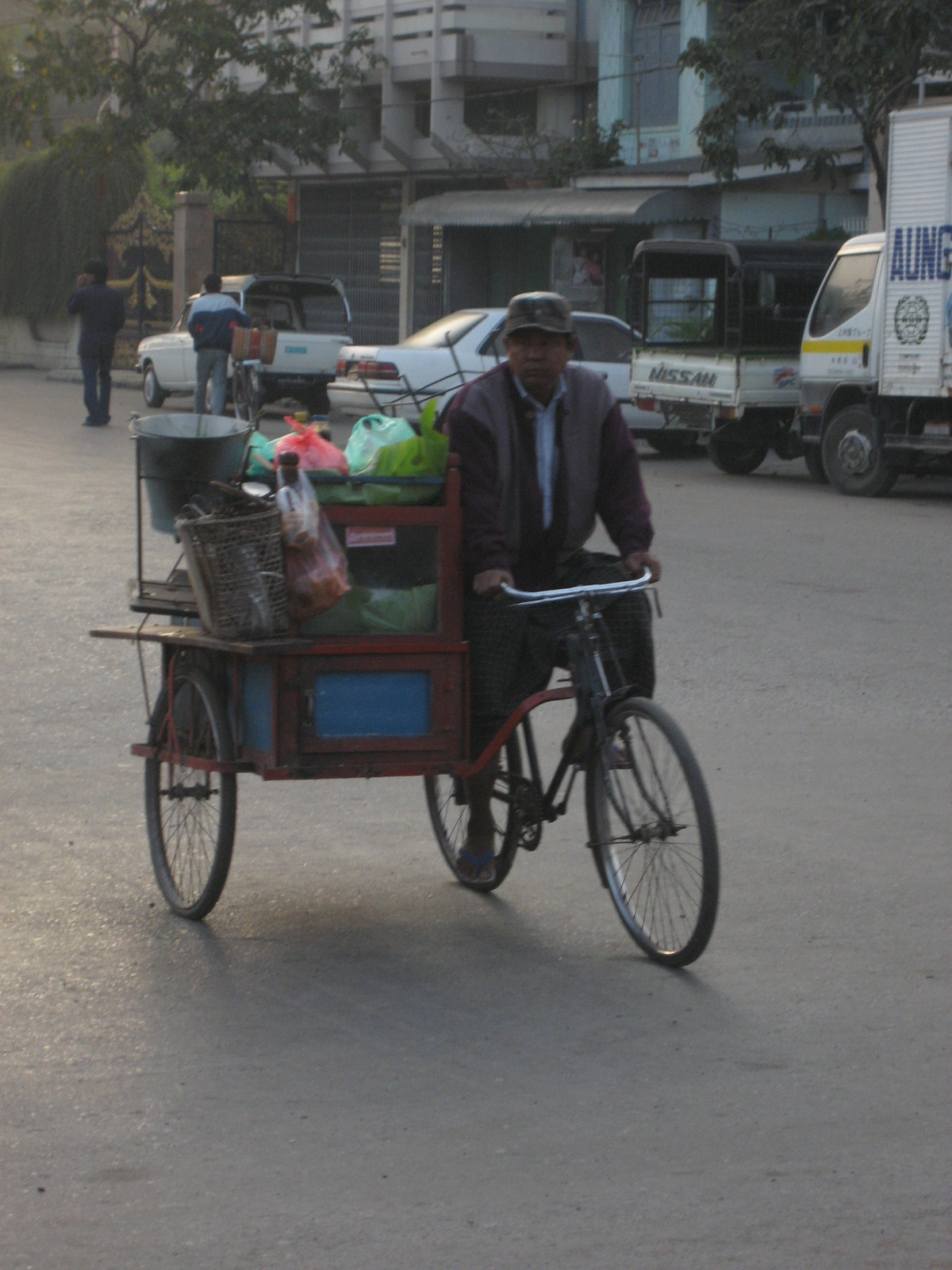
Mandalay rickshaw peddler

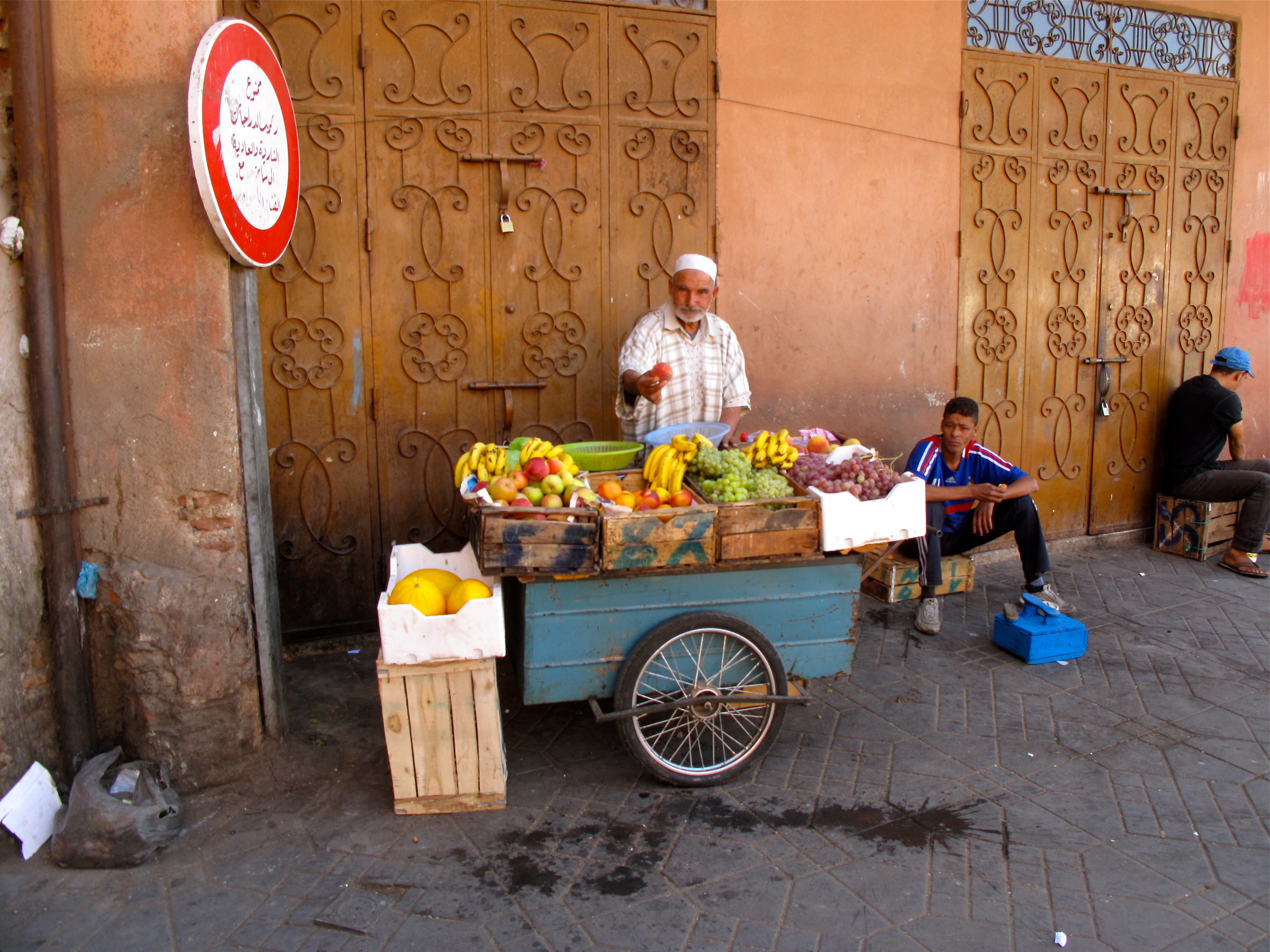
The Produce Peddler, Fez, Morocco

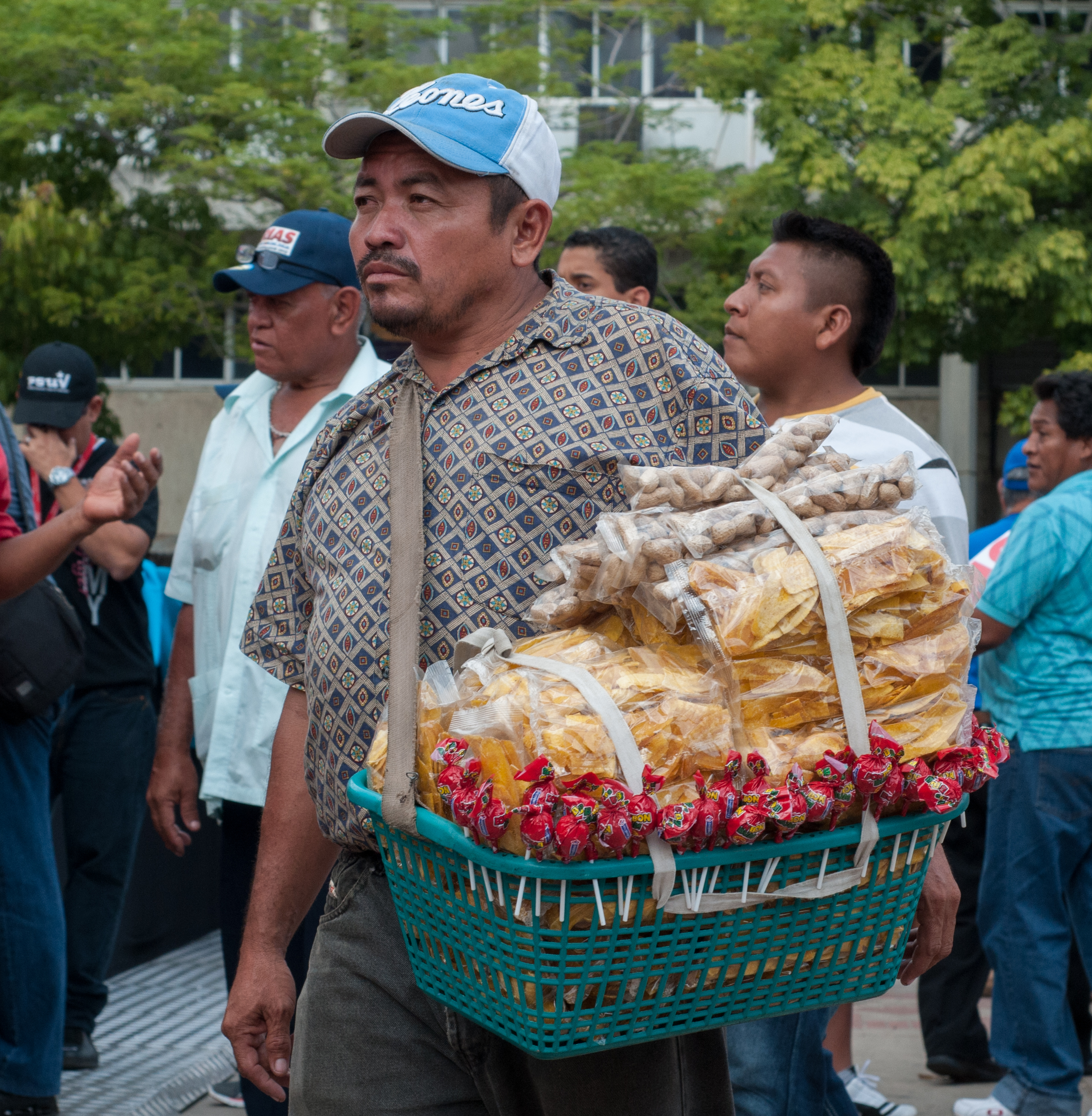
Street vendor in Maracaibo with improvised carry container

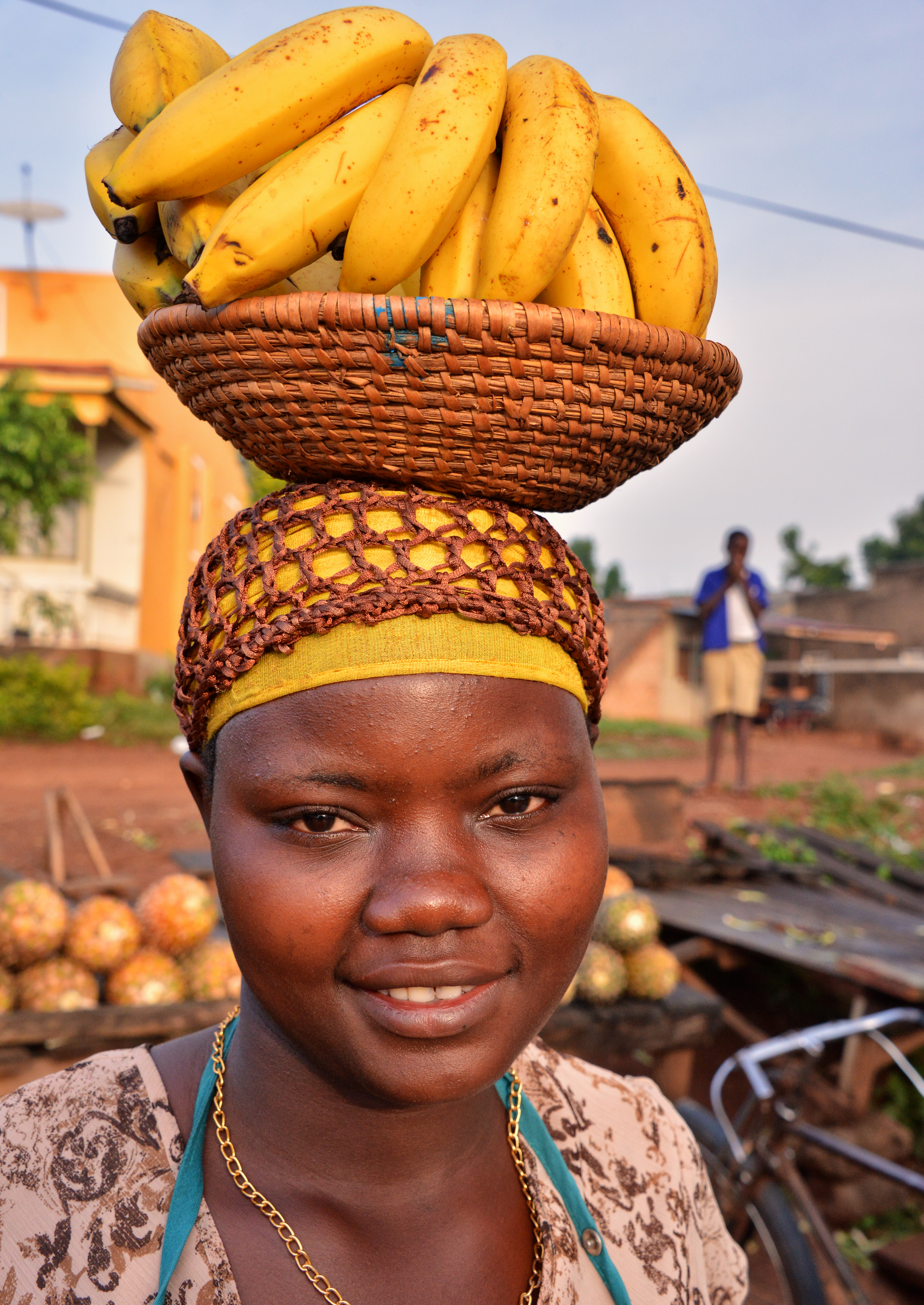
Banana vendor, Uganda

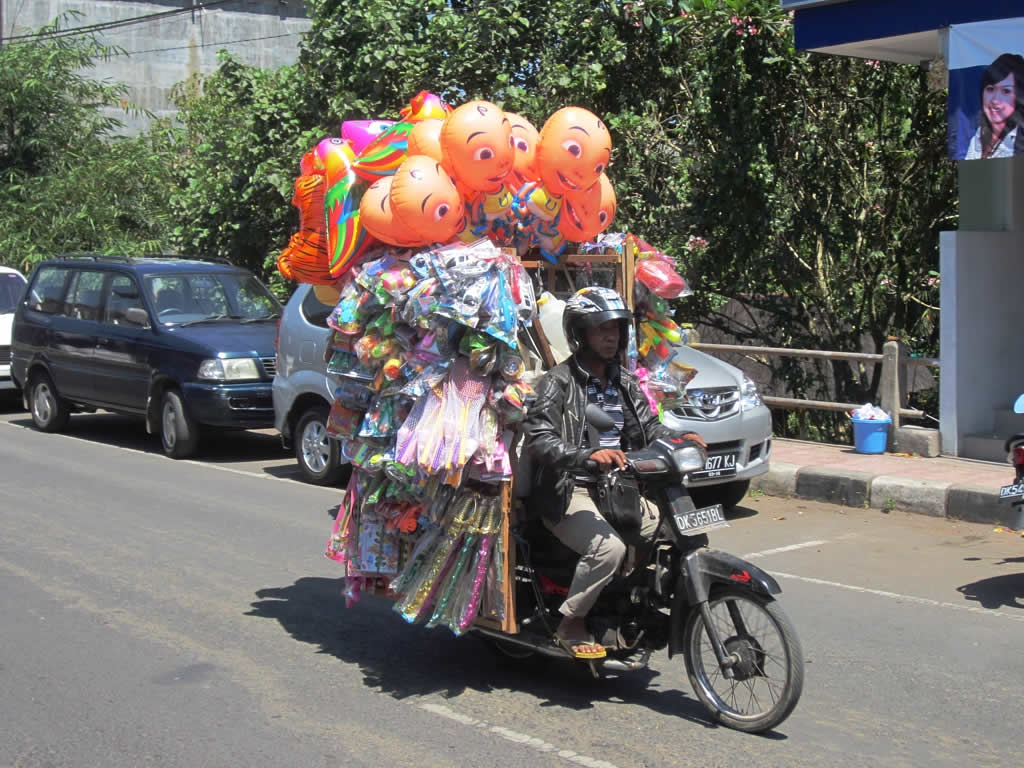
Balloon Salesman

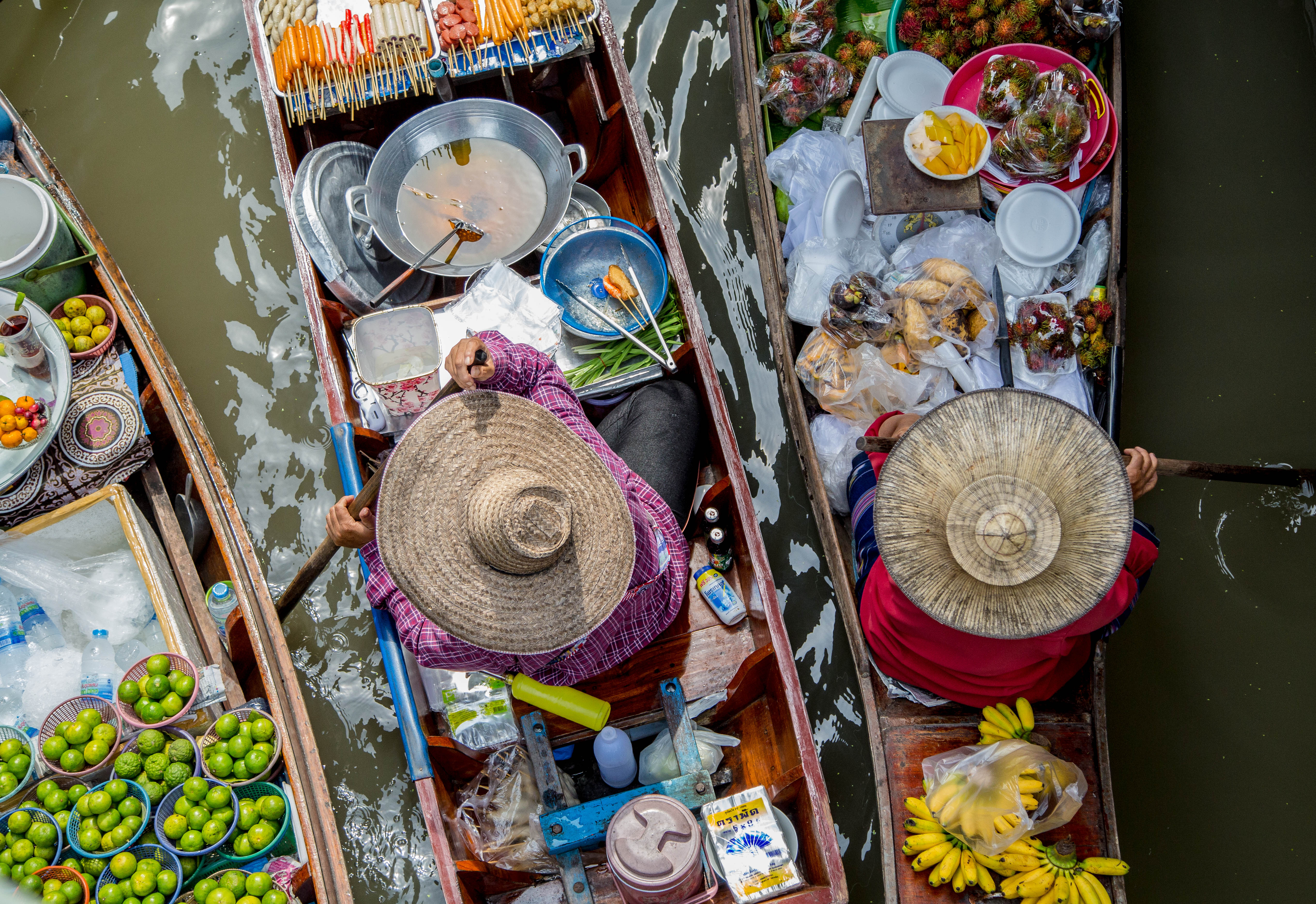
Food peddlers are the mainstay of the floating markets in Thailand

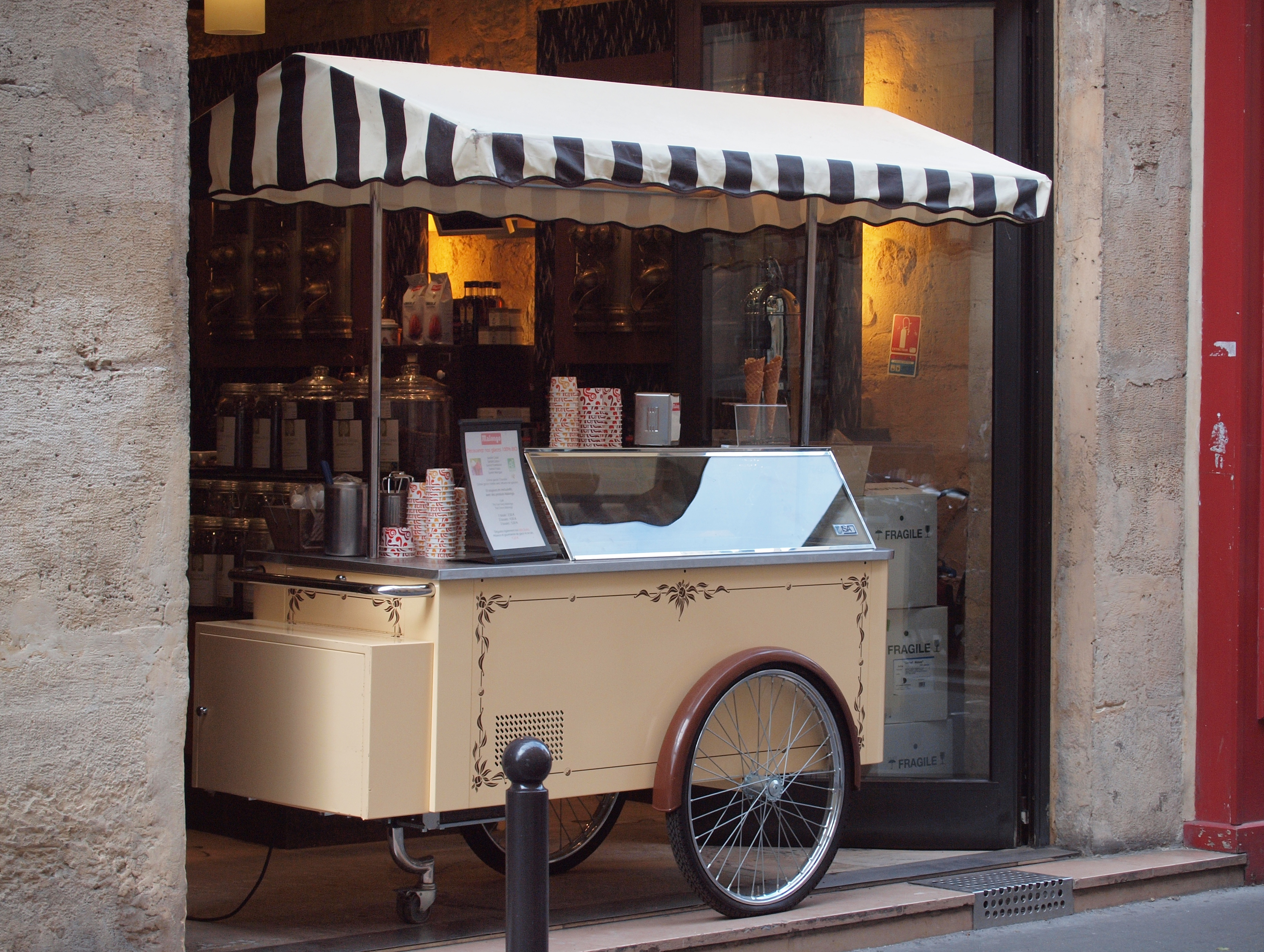
Ice cream seller in Paris, France 2010

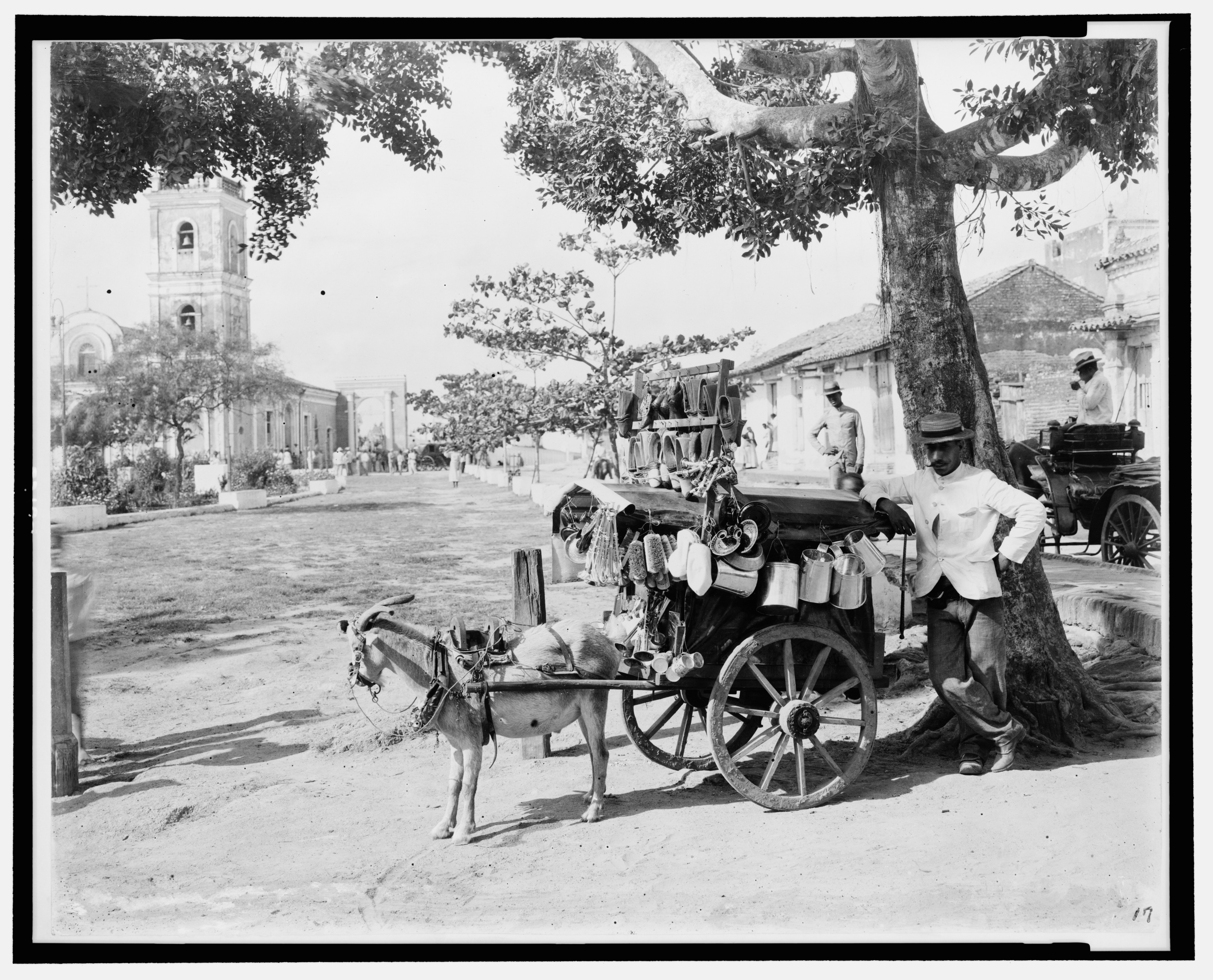
Goat wagon peddler, late 19th century

== Legislation and regulation ==
A number of countries have enacted laws to protect the rights of peddlers, and also to protect the public from the sale of inferior goods. In many states of the US, peddlers are required to apply for a license. India has special laws enacted by the efforts of planners which give mongers more rights than other businessmen. For example, mongers have a right of way over motorized vehicles.

In Britain, peddling is still governed by the Pedlars Act 1871, which provides for a "pedlar's certificate". Application is usually made to the police. In the late 20th century, the use of such certificates became rare as other civic legislation including the Civic Government (Scotland) Act 1982 and the Local Government (Miscellaneous Provisions) Act, 1982 for England and Wales introduced a street trader's license. As of 2008, the peddler's certificates remain legal and in use, although several local councils have sought to eradicate peddlers by way of local bylaws or enforcement mechanisms such as making them apply for a street trader's license.

== Types and names ==
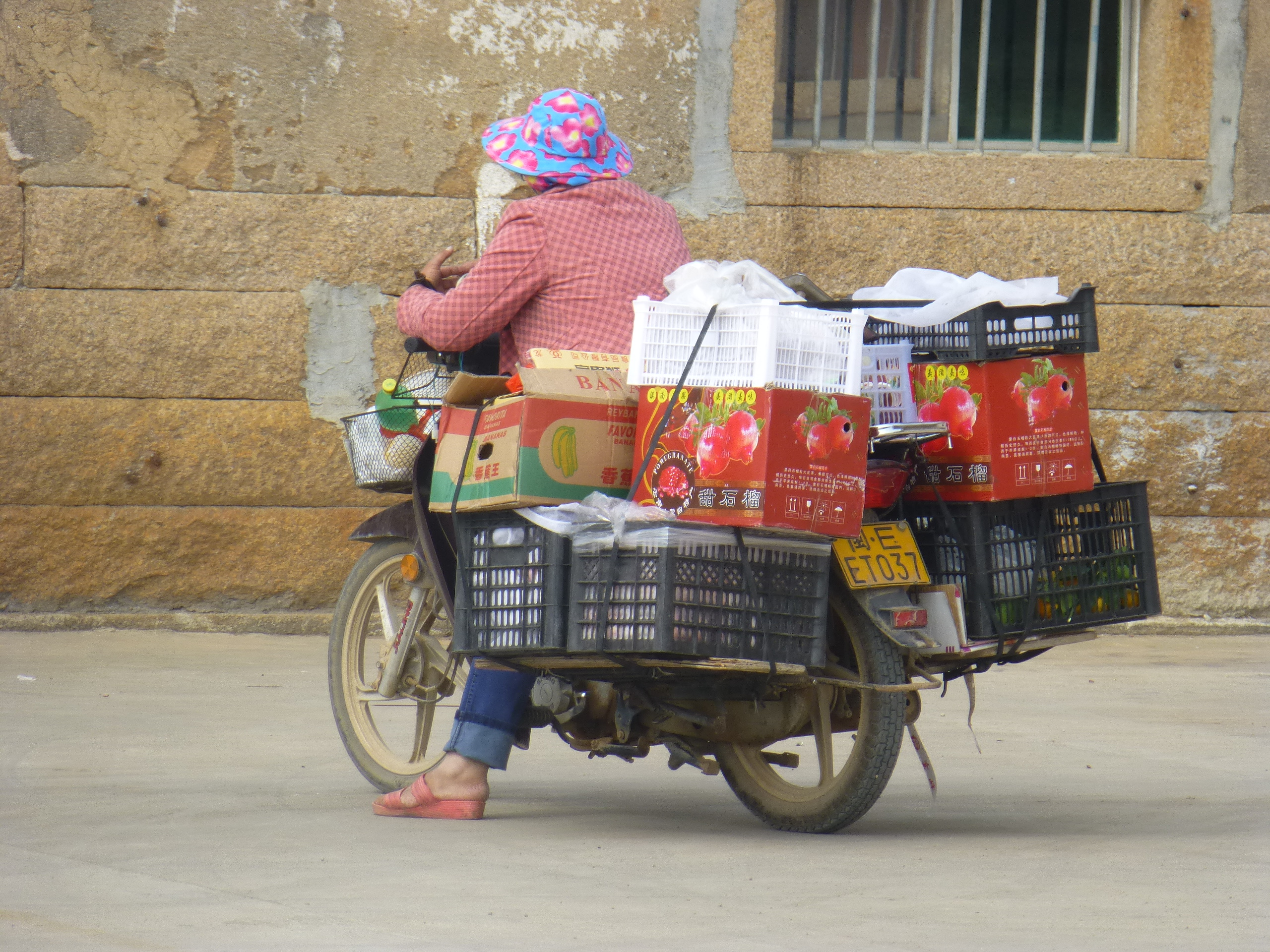
A typical door-to-door vendor in rural Zhangpu County, Fujian, China.

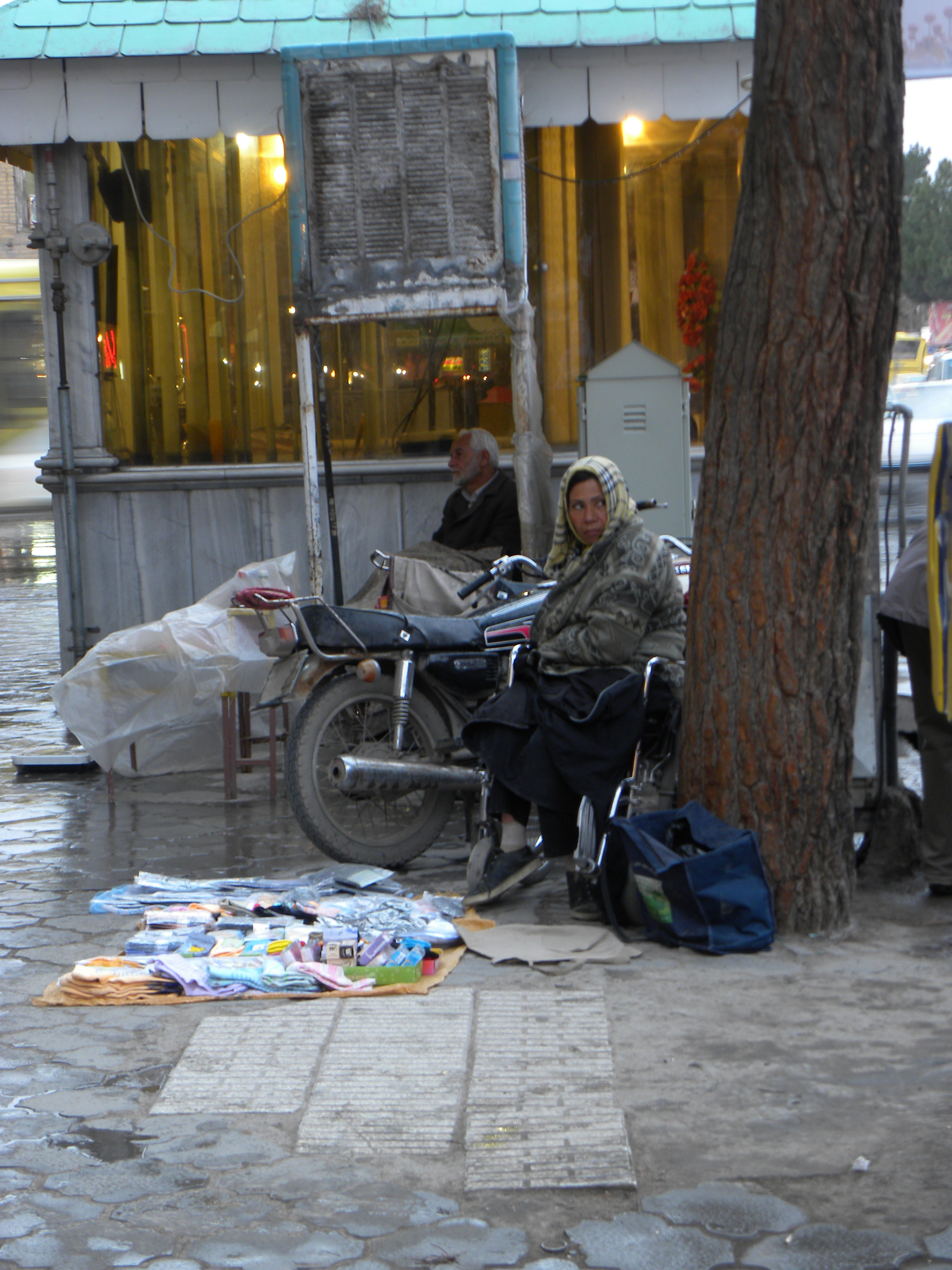
A peddler woman in Nishapur.

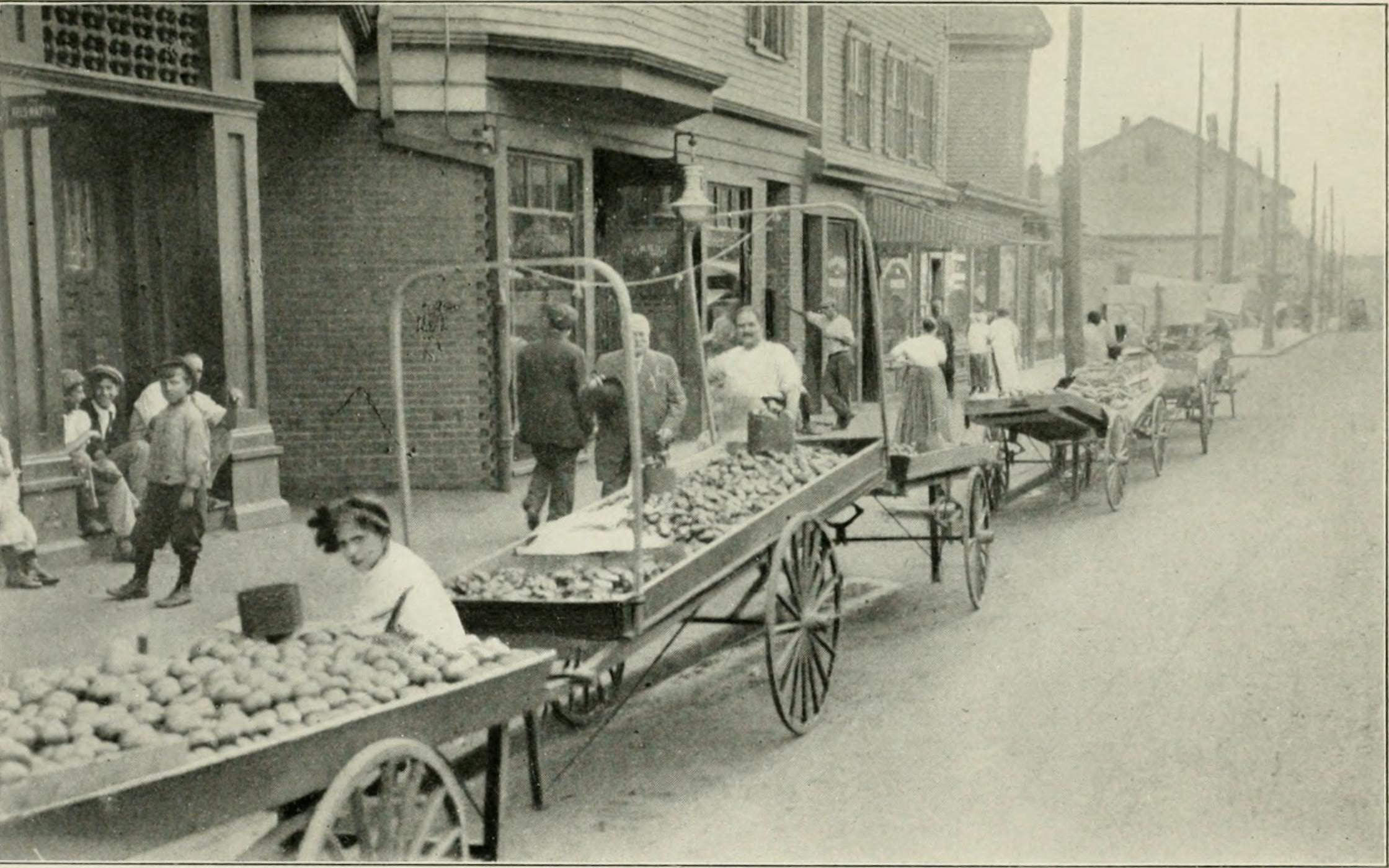
Peddlers in the street, Boston, c. 1915

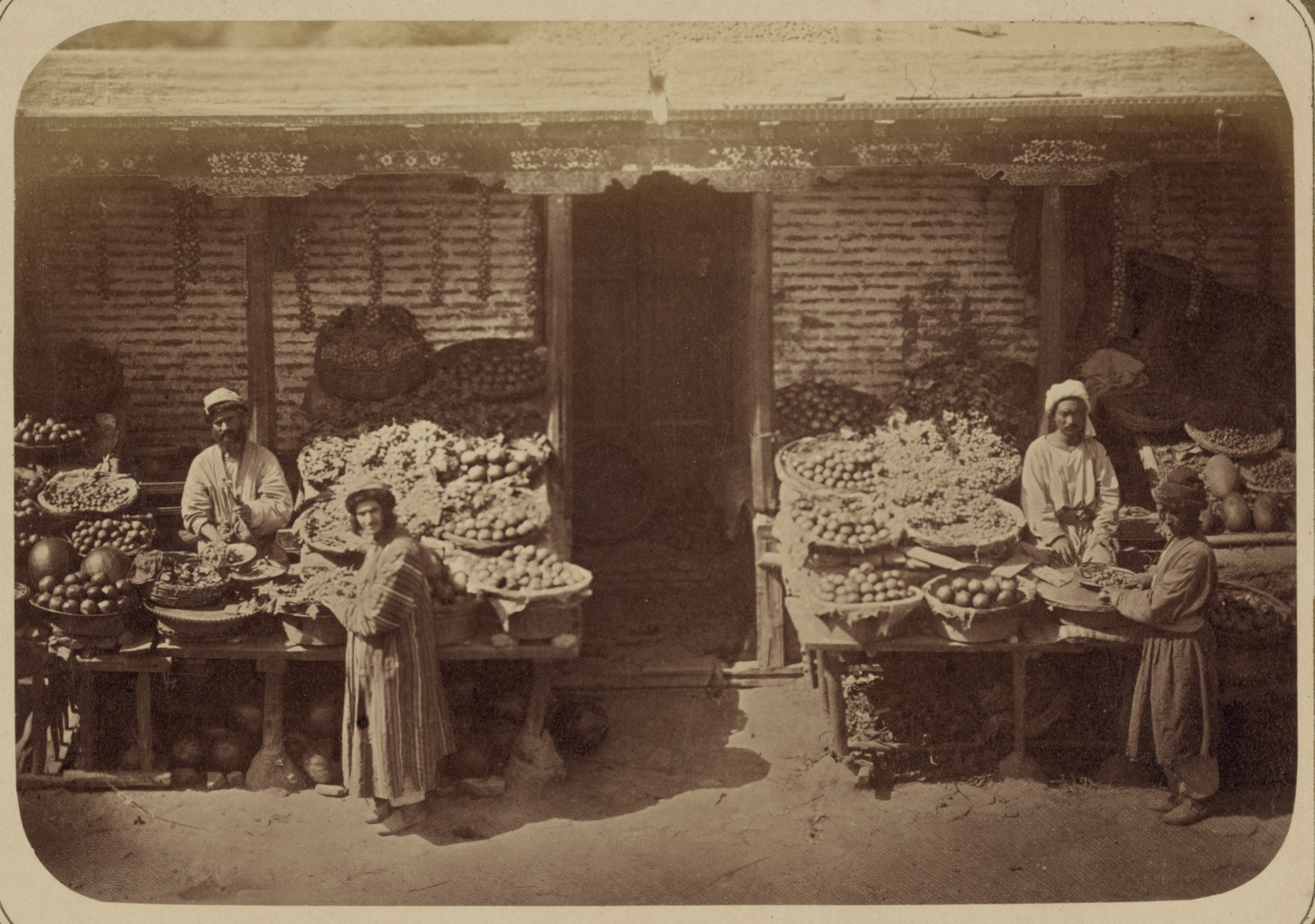
Peddling fruit, Turkey, 1872-1885

Literal compounds formed from these synonyms are:

- Cheesemonger (cheese)
- Costermonger (apples)
- Fishmonger (seafood)
- Ironmonger (iron wares)
- Upholsterer monger (a peddler of fabrics and stitching)

Metaphoric compounds, since the 16th century mostly pejorative, formed from these synonyms are:

- Disease mongering
- Flesh monger, procurer for prostitution
- Gossip monger (a 'quidnunc')
- Merit-monger, in the 18th century a "do-gooder"
- Power monger
- Rumor monger
- Scandal monger
- Scare monger
- Warmonger, recorded since 1590 (Spenser's Faerie Queene), likely more widespread than any of the literal uses.

Names, most archaic, of product- or industry-specific types of peddlers include:

- Chandler (ship's stores)
- Collier (coal)
- Milliner (hats)
- Lanier (now only a surname, formerly a peddler of wool)
- Cooper (barrels)

Names, some pejorative, of other sub- or supertypes or close relatives of peddlers include:

- Arabber
- Commercial traveller, in Australian English
- Costermonger
- Door-to-door salesman
- Haberdasher
- Hawker
- Huckster
- Pusher
- Merchant
- Seller
- Tout
- Travelling salesman
- Rag-and-bone man
- Street vendor

Individual peddlers (of myth and history)

- Pedlar of Swaffham (English folktale, recorded in 1699)
- James Macfarlan (1832-1862) Scottish poet and peddler
- Valentina Pielich - Tina Vajtova (also Tina Vajtawa) (1900– 1984) Resian Slovenian peddler and folk storyteller of Resian fairy tales

Although there are basic similarities between the activities in the Old World and the New World, there are also significant differences. In Britain, the word was more specific to an individual selling small items of household goods from door to door. It was not usually applied to Gypsies.

- Food traders were normally badgers
- Sellers of chapbooks were chapmen; compare the term stationer which described a bookseller (usually near a university) whose shop was fixed and permanent.
- In Russia a Khodebshchik (Russian: ходебщик) was a person carrying a billboard advertising a product or service, a street hawker or peddler of wares, or house-to-house salesman in the 16th–19th centuries.

== In literature and art ==
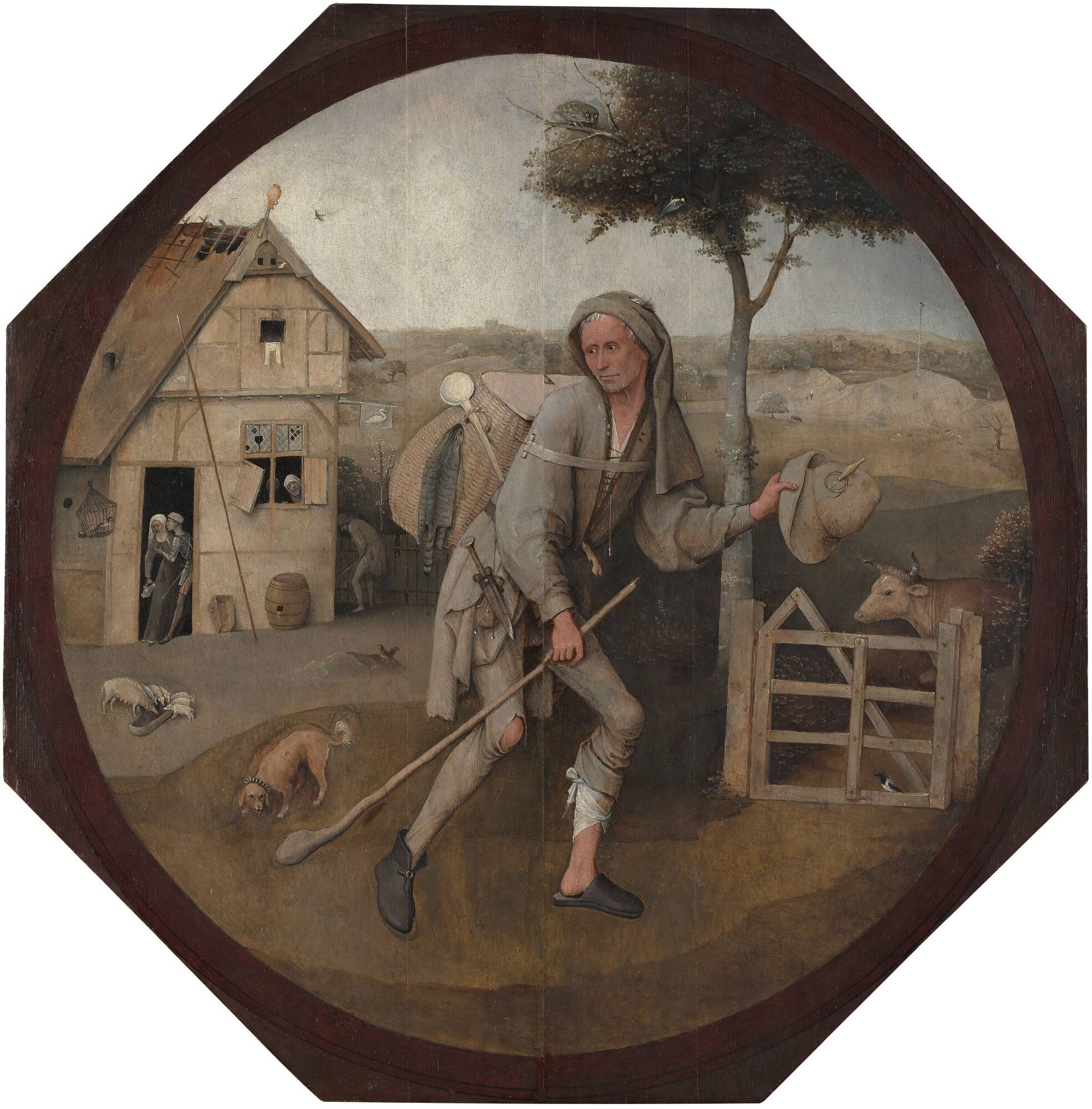
The Wayfarer by Hieronymous Bosch, c. 1500

Peddlers have been the subject of numerous paintings, sketches and watercolors in both Western art and in the Orient, where they depict familiar scenes of everyday life. Some of the earliest paintings of peddlers were made in China. The 12th-century Chinese artist, Su Hanchen made several paintings of peddlers as did one of his contemporaries, Li Song, both of whom painted The Knick knack Peddler.

The Wayfarer by Hieronymous Bosch is perhaps the most iconic image of a peddler. Painted in about 1500, the peddler in this painting wears a costume almost identical to thieves in other Bosch paintings. From the 18th-century, engravings featuring peddlers and street vendors featured in numerous volumes dedicated to representations of street life. One of the first of such publications was a French publication, Etudes Prises Dans let Bas Peuple, Ou Les Cris de Paris (1737) (roughly translated as Studies Taken of the Lower People, Or The Cries of Paris). In 1757, the first English publication in this genre was The Cries of London Calculated to Entertain the Minds of Old and Young; illustrated in variety of copper plates neatly engrav'd with an emblematical description of each subject, was published. and followed by Cries of London (1775) These were followed by numerous illustrated works which continued into the 20th century.

Bonnie Young has pointed out that the theme of the monkey and the peddler was relatively common in Medieval art across Europe. These scenes, which appear in books and on silverware, often depict bands of monkeys robbing the peddler while he sleeps. Such images may have been popular in medieval society because the peddler shared many of the same vices as a monkey; he was seen as "a showman, a bit of a trickster and not always acquiring his wares by honest means and plying them without too much regard for the quality of the merchandise."

The Cheap Jack stereotype appears often in 19th-century literature. The most famous example is probably Charles Dickens' "Doctor Marigold". It is a short story originally written for one of his Christmas editions of All the Year Round. In collected editions of Dickens' works, it appears in the volume Christmas Stories.

Russian lubok prints (popular prints) also feature peddlers along with other popular stereotypes. Some scholars suggest that the origin of the term, lubok, may have come from the word lubki - a type of basket typically carried by peddlers as they carried a myriad of different wares into villages in old Russia. Korobeiniki is a Russian folk song that describes a meeting between a peddler and a girl. Their haggling is a metaphor for their courtship.

The Lady and the Peddler, (1947) is an American play by Yosefa Even Shoshan and adapted from a story by S.Y. Agnon. The plot concerns a Jewish peddler who takes up residence with a mysterious gentile woman. Residing in a forest setting, the situation is idyllic for the traveling salesman, as the woman provides for all his needs and never asks for anything in return. Soon, however, he comes to realize that the woman is an evil spirit in disguise. The story is thought to be a metaphor for the dislocation and destruction of European Jews. St Patrick and the Peddler by Margaret Hodges is a novel about a peddler who is visited by St Patrick in his dreams and through a circuitous route uncovers great riches.

Death of a Salesman (1949) is a 1949 stage play written by the American playwright Arthur Miller. Set in late 1940s Brooklyn, a traveling salesman, Willy Loman realizes he has been a failure as a father and a husband. His sons, Happy and Biff, are not successful, on his terms (being "well-liked") or any others. His career fading, Willy escapes into dreamy reminiscences of an idealized past.

Robin Hood and the Peddler is a ballad that now forms part of the collection at the American Folklife Center, Library of Congress.

The Merchant of Four Seasons (1972) is a critically acclaimed film about a German fruit-peddler, directed by Rainer Werner Fassbinder.

The Tin Men (1987), a feature film directed by Barry Levinson and starring Richard Dreyfuss and Danny De Vito, is a comedy set in 1963, concerning two aluminum salesmen and the dirty tricks they use to make a sale as they try to out-compete each other.

The Knick-knack Peddler by Su Hanchen, 12th Century

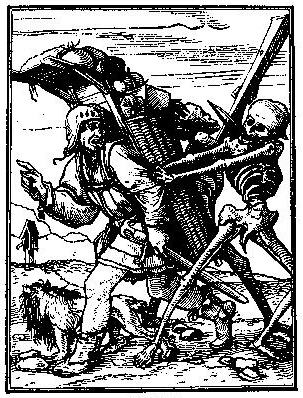
The Pedlar by Hans Holbein 1538 Pedlar

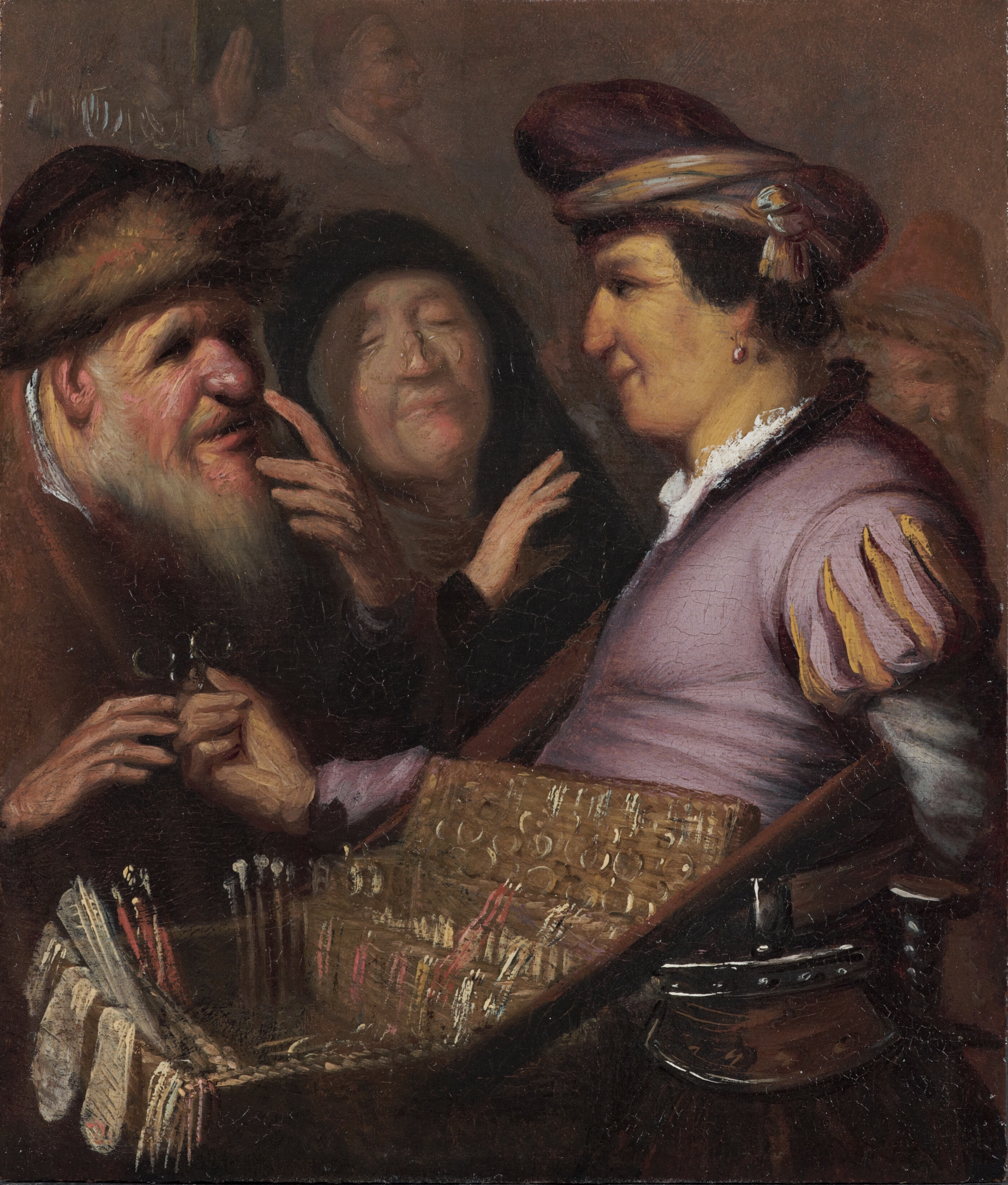
The spectacle-pedlar, Rembrandt van Rijn, c. 1624–1625

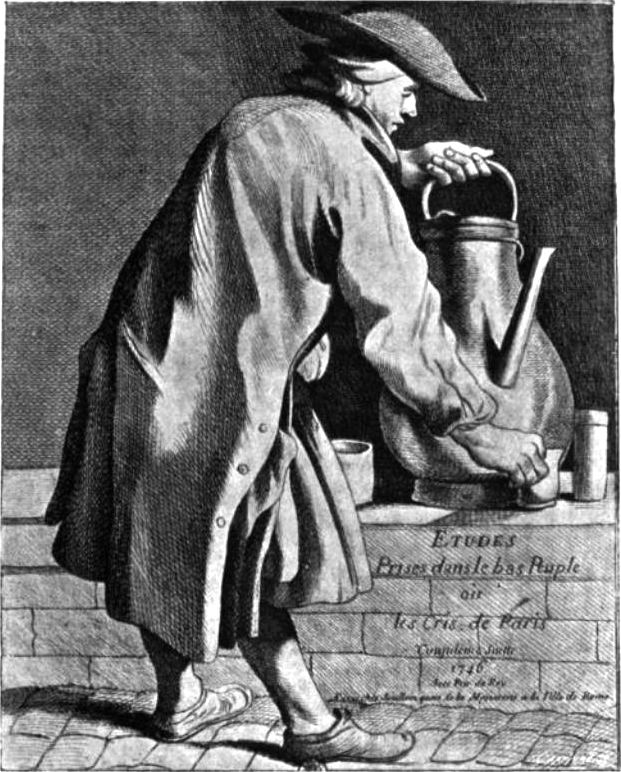
Coffee Peddler, engraving from Etudes Prises Dans let Bas Peuple, Ou Les Cris de Paris, 1737

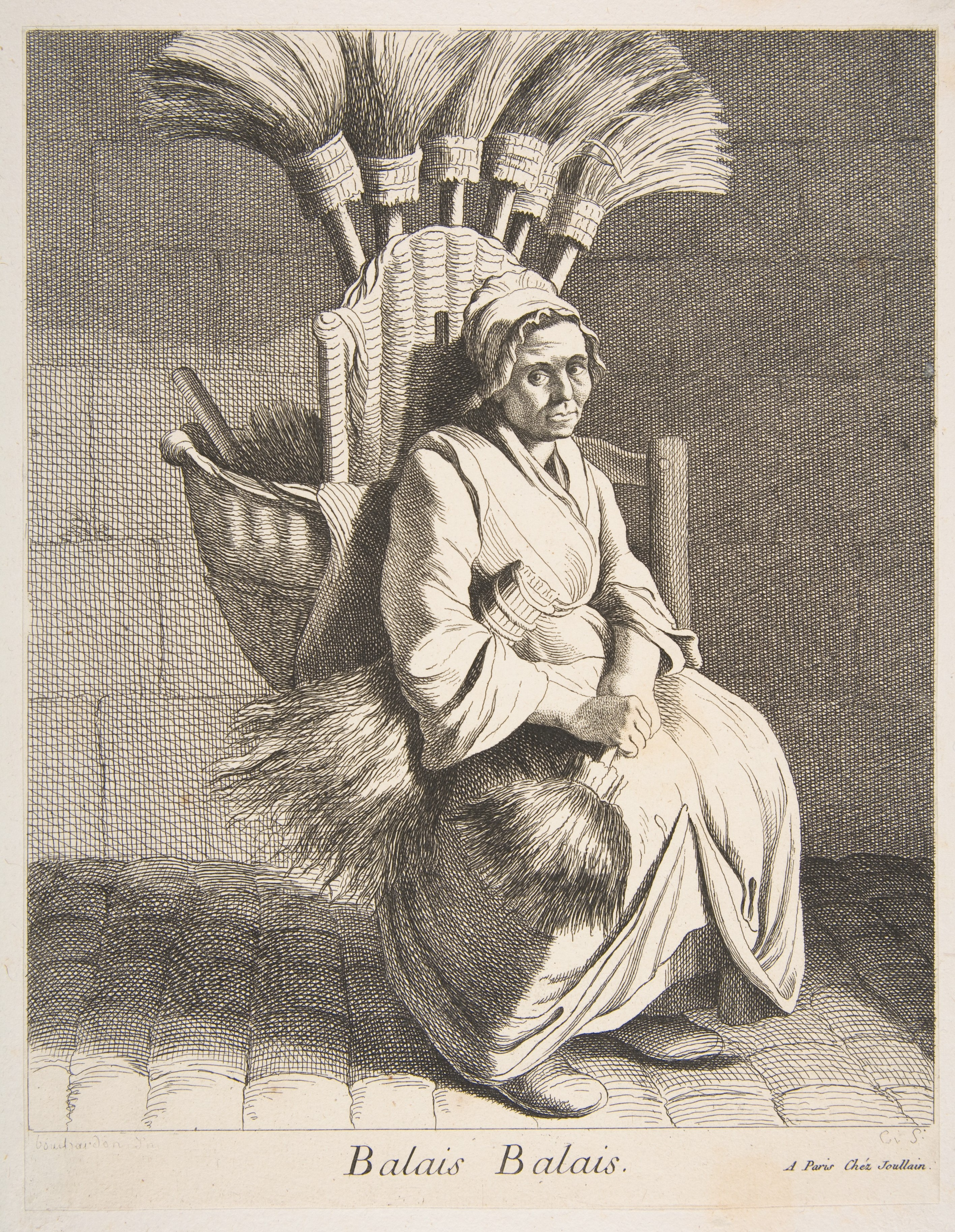
Broom Peddler, by François Joullain, Etching, 1737

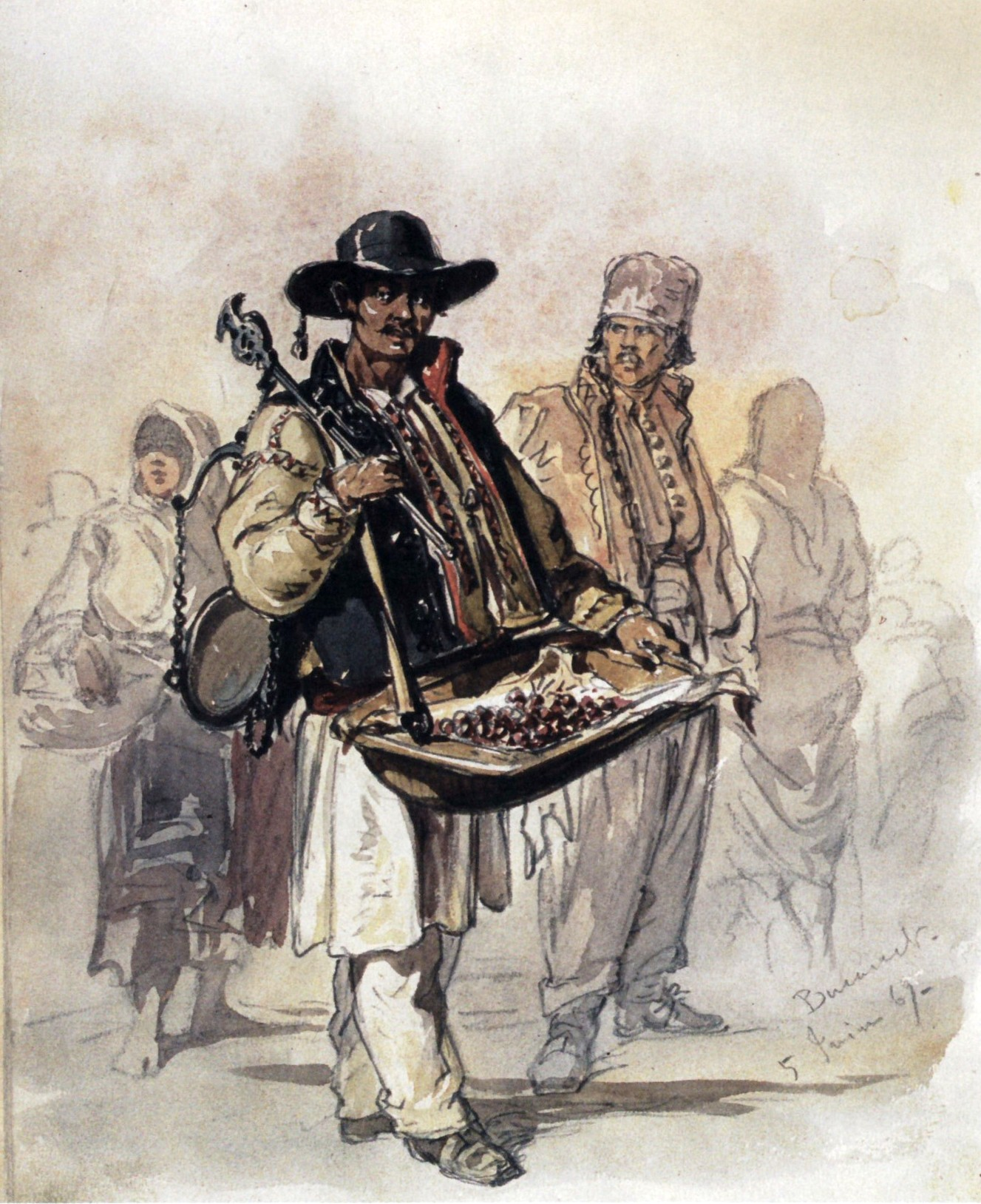
Cherry peddler in Bucharest, painting by Amadeo Preziosi, c. 1869

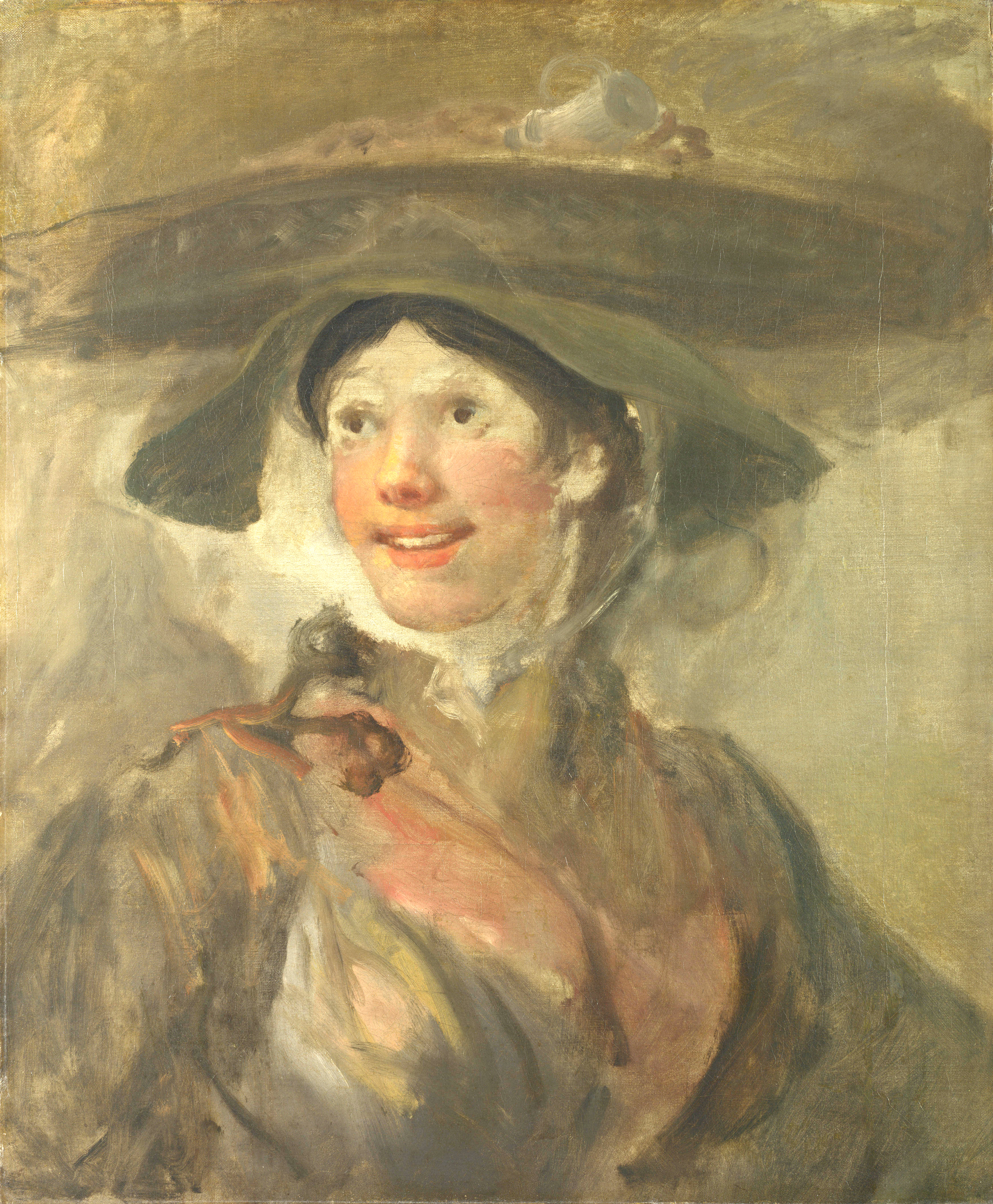
The Shrimp Girl by William Hogarth, 1740

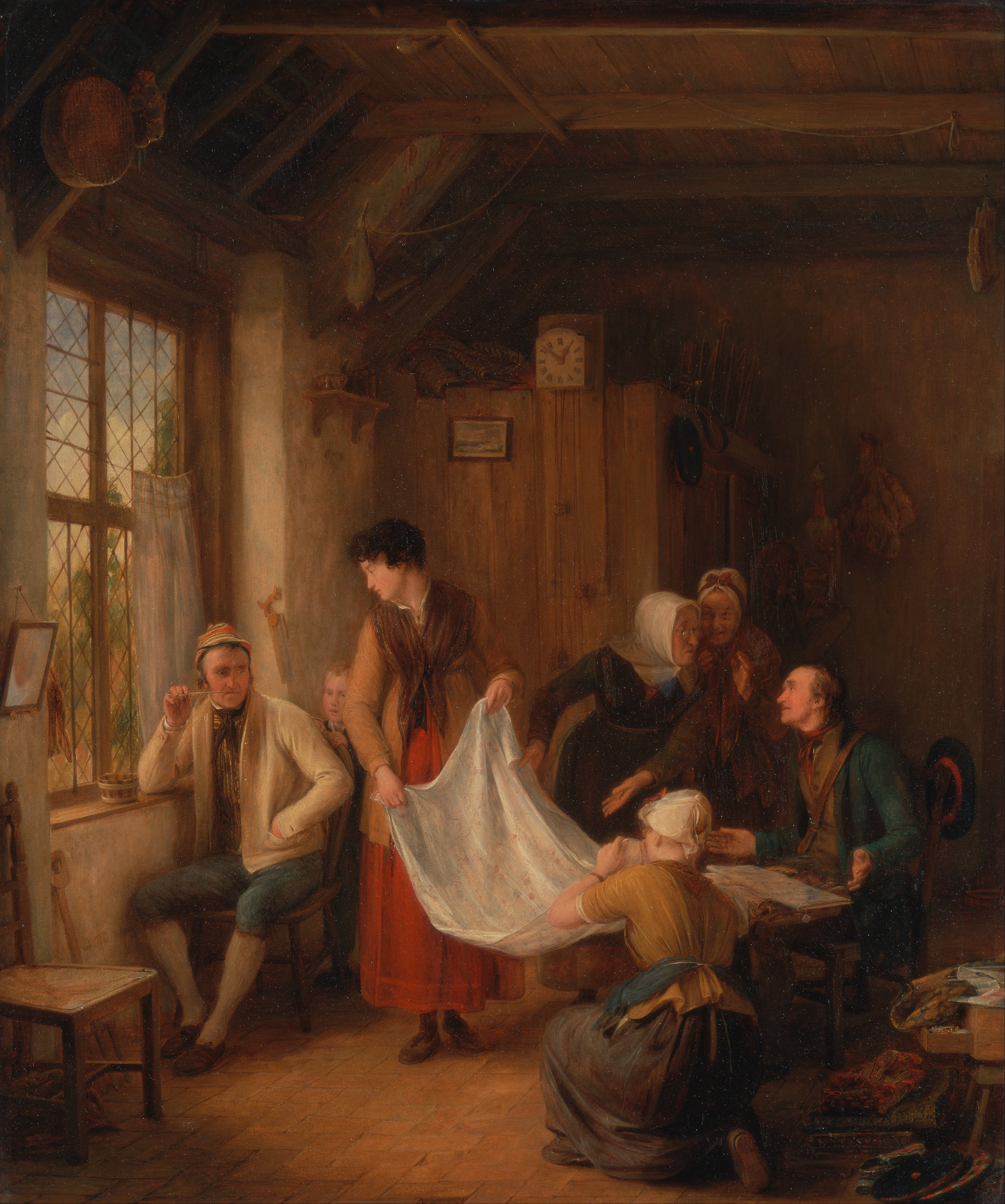
The Pedlar by David Wilkie, 1814

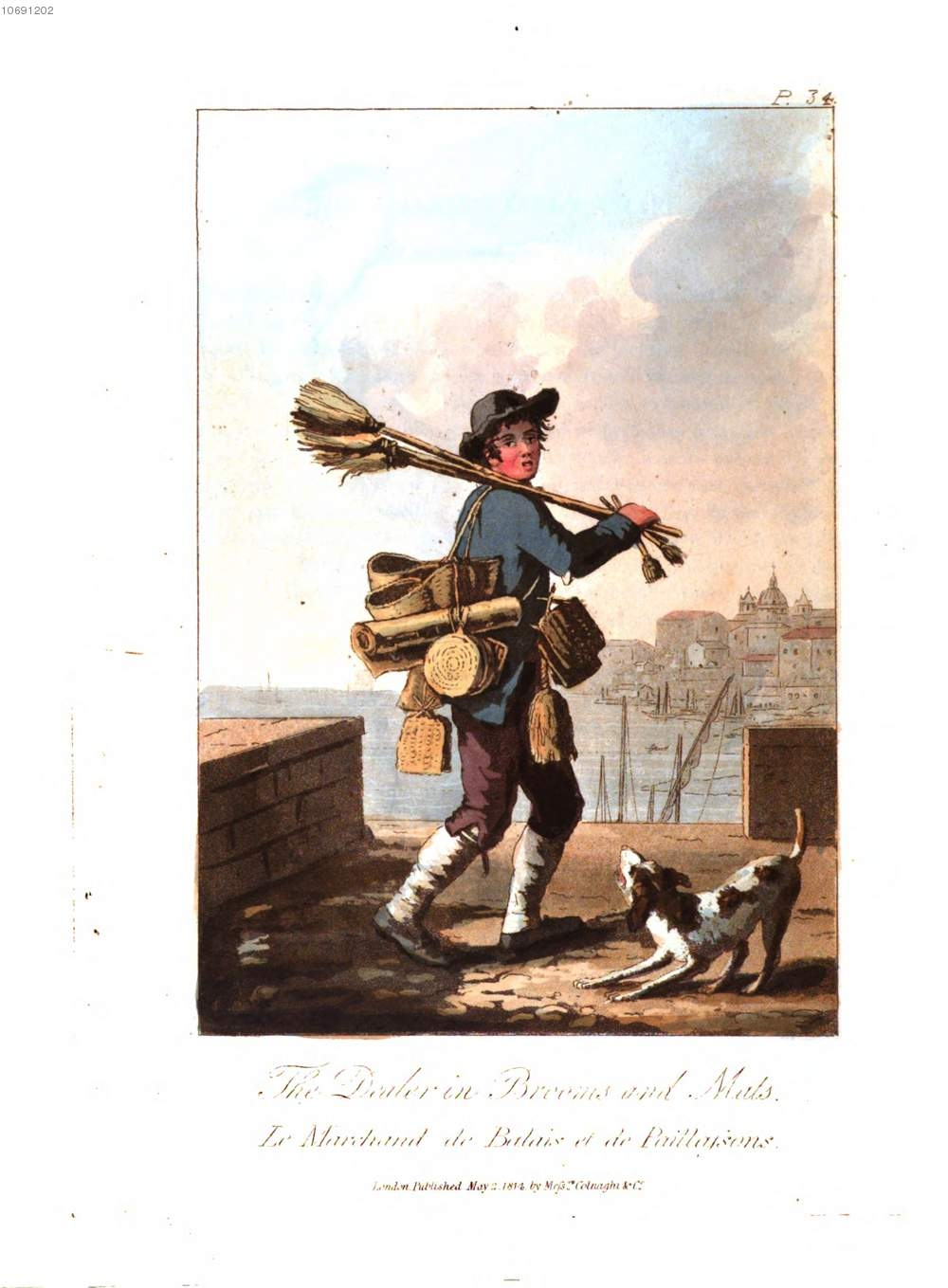
Portuguese peddler by Henry L'Evêque, 1814

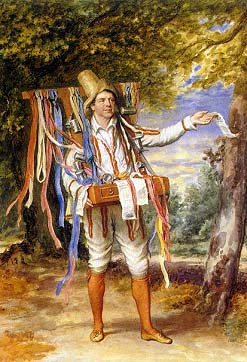
Fawcett as Autolycus by Thomas Wageman, 1828

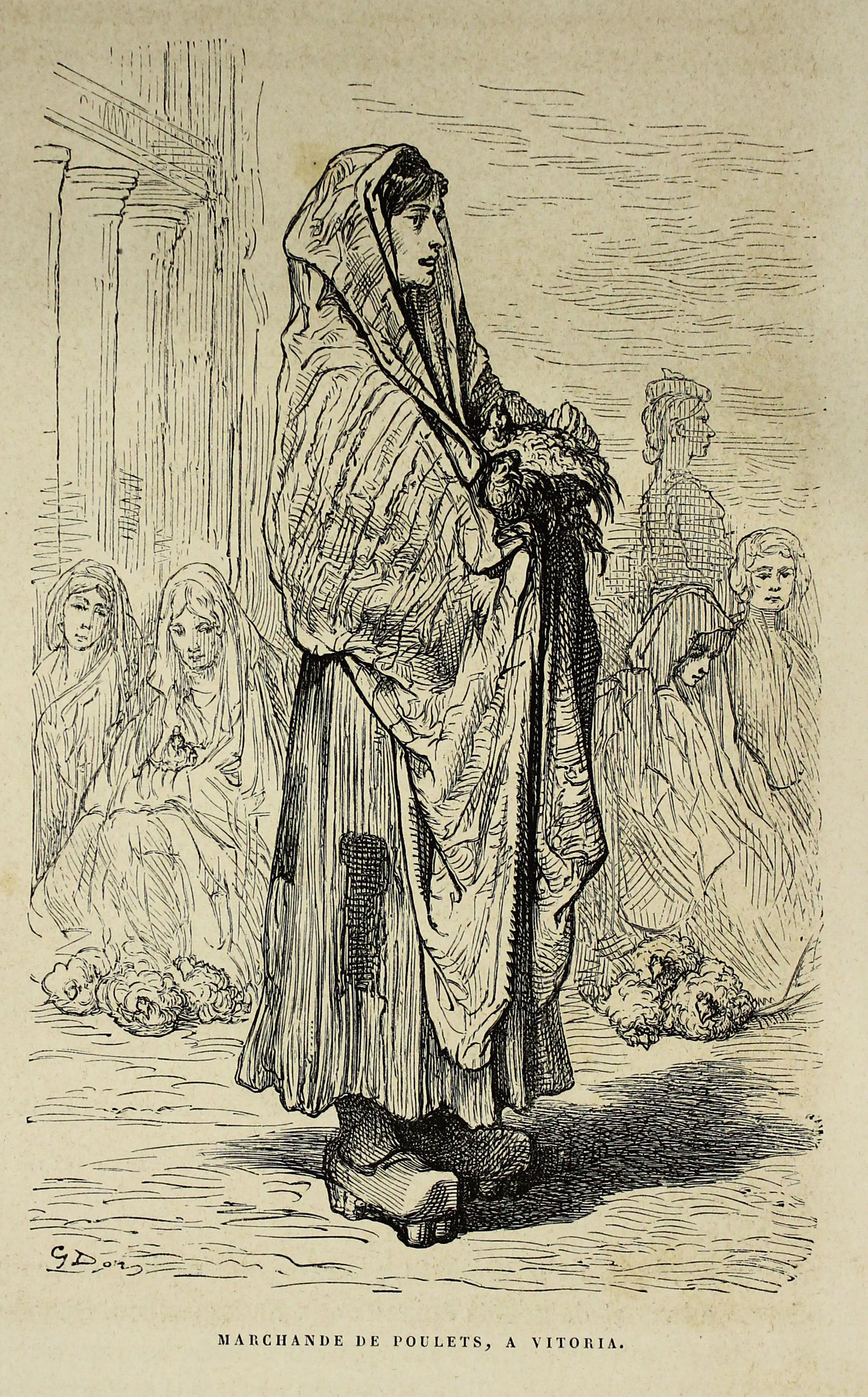
Poultry seller by Jean Davillier, 1874

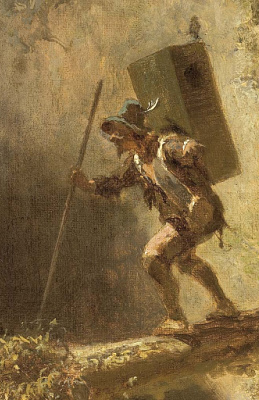
Pedlar by Carl Spitzweg, 1875

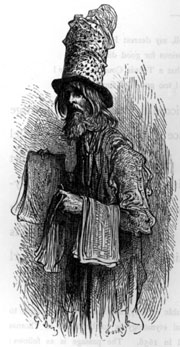
London Pedlar by Gustave Doré, late 19th century

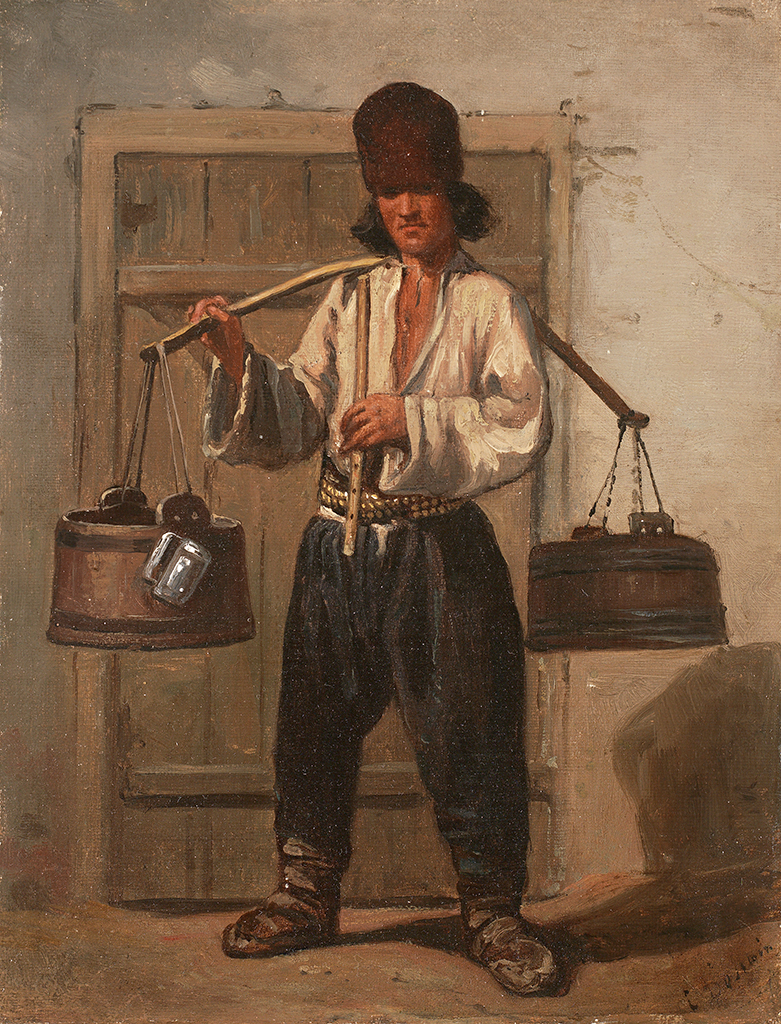
Russian peddler by Emile Francois Dessain, 1882

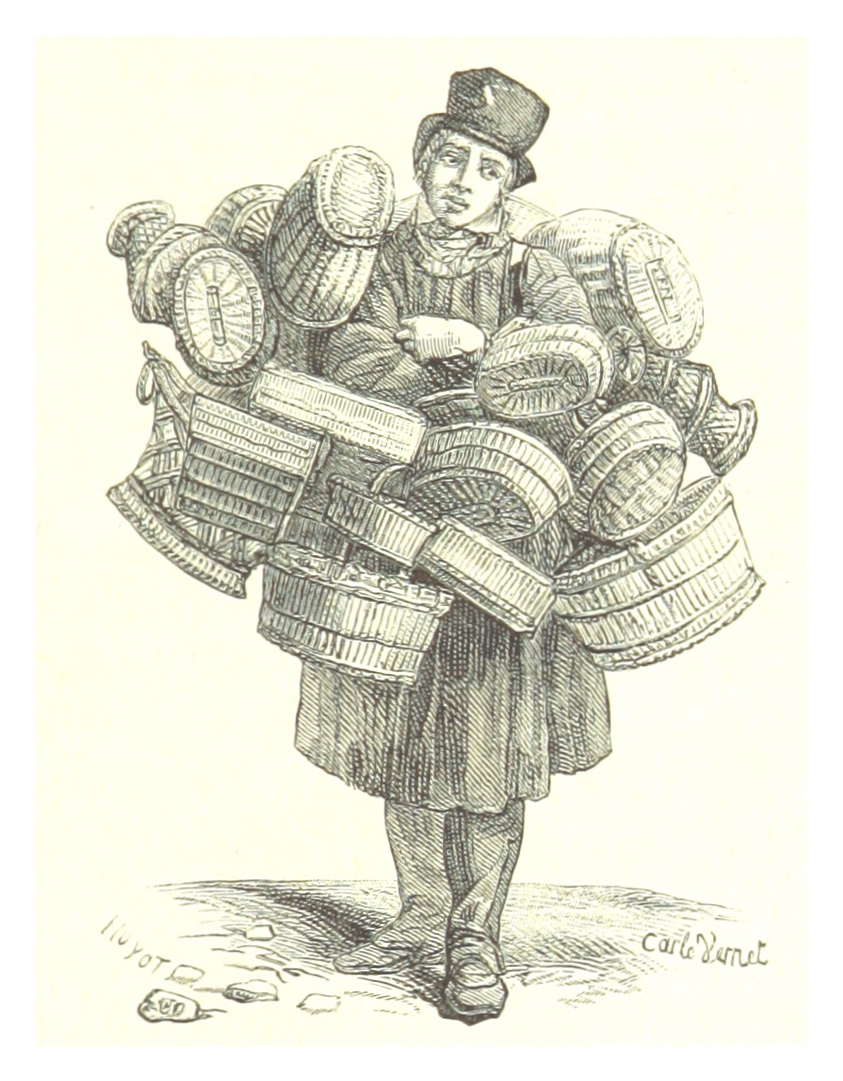
Basket Pedlar by Victor Fournel, 1887

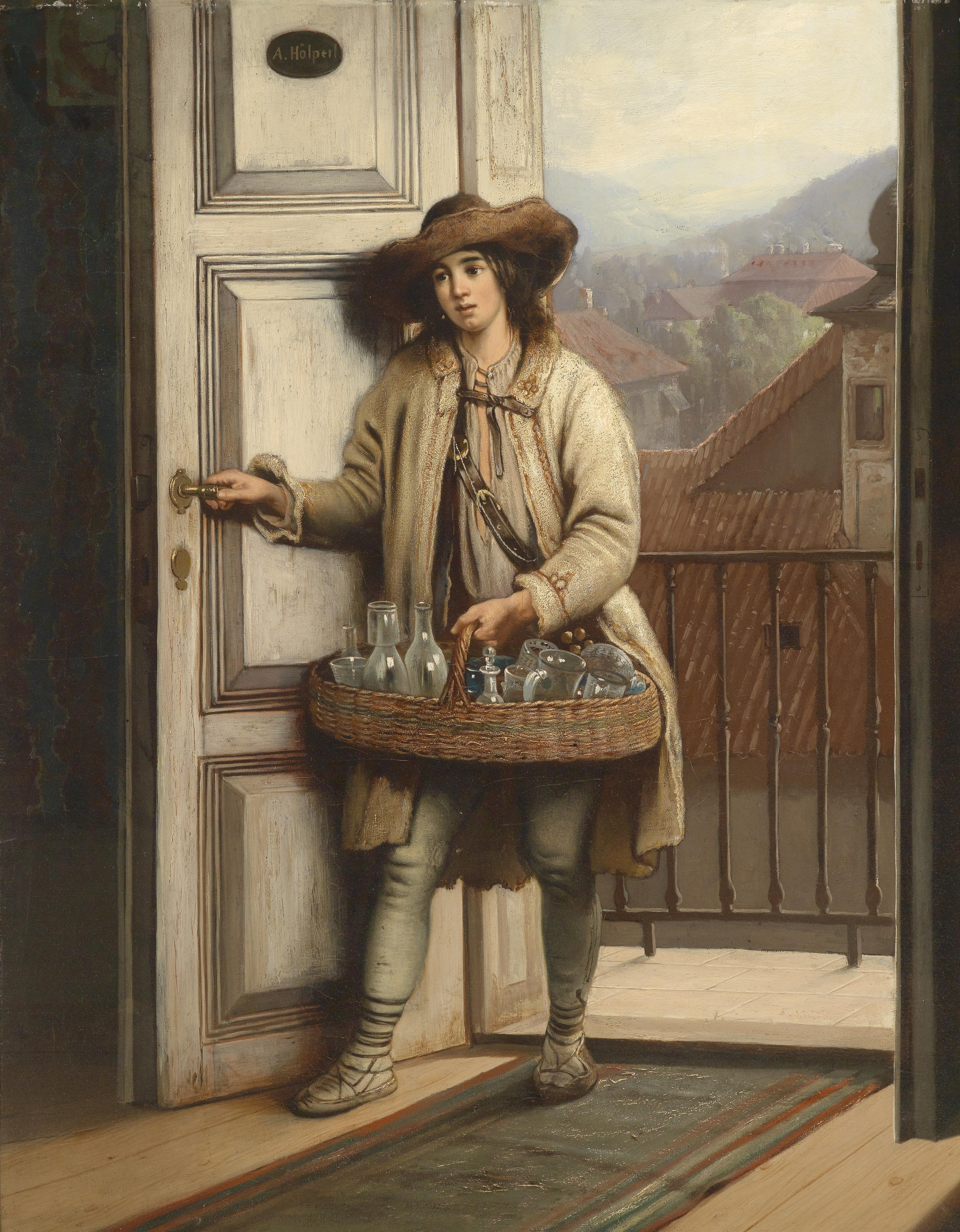
Slovak peddler by Antonin Hölper, 1888

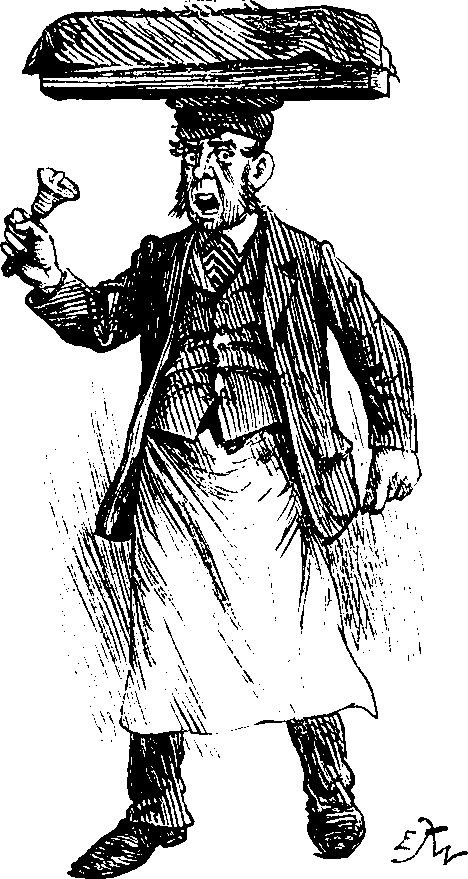
Punch, 1892

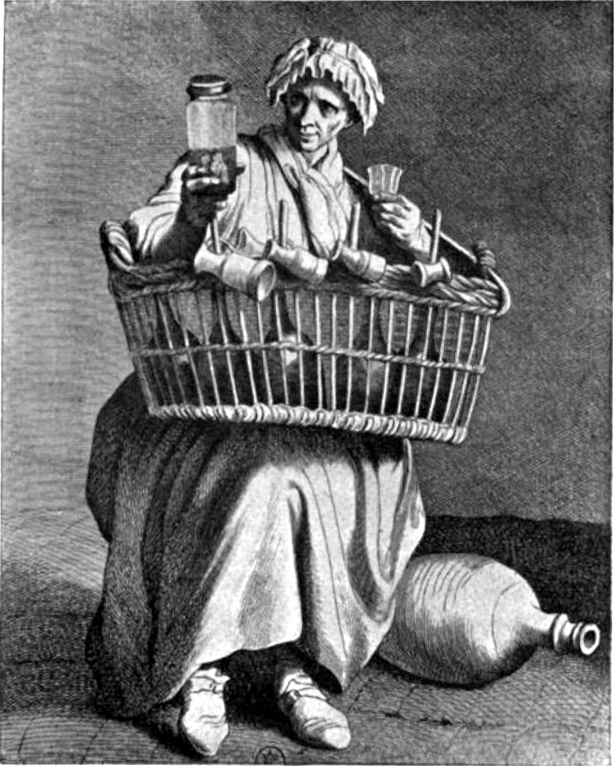
Brandy Peddler from Paul Clacquesin, Histoire de la Communauté des Distillateurs, 1900

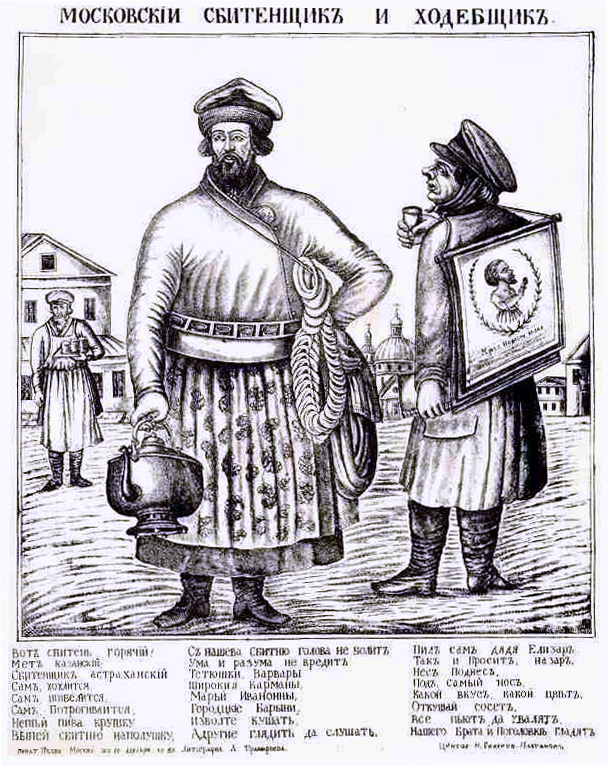
Sbitenshchik and Khodebshchik, a "lubok print," 19th century

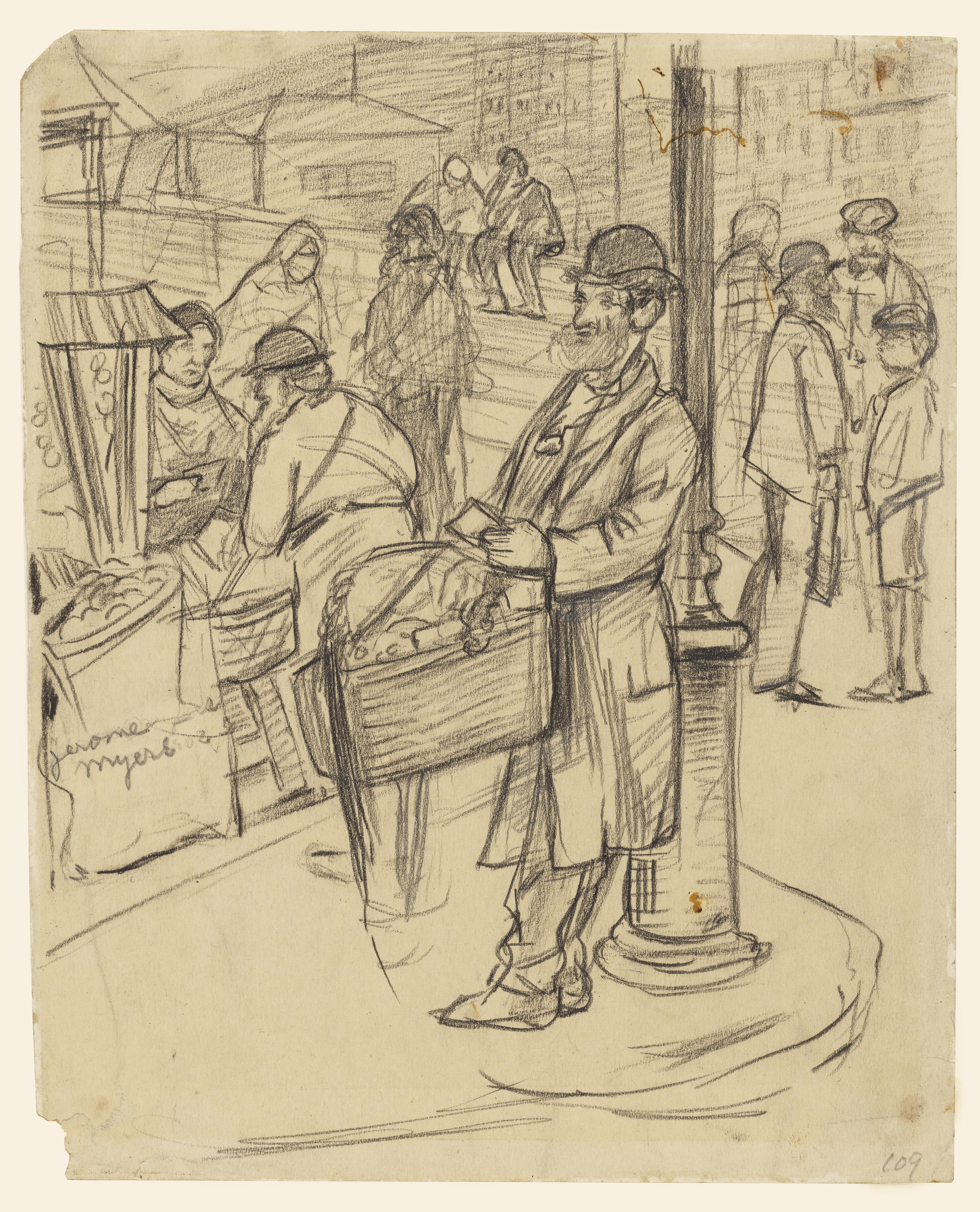
The Peddler, US, 1903, chalk drawing, unknown artist

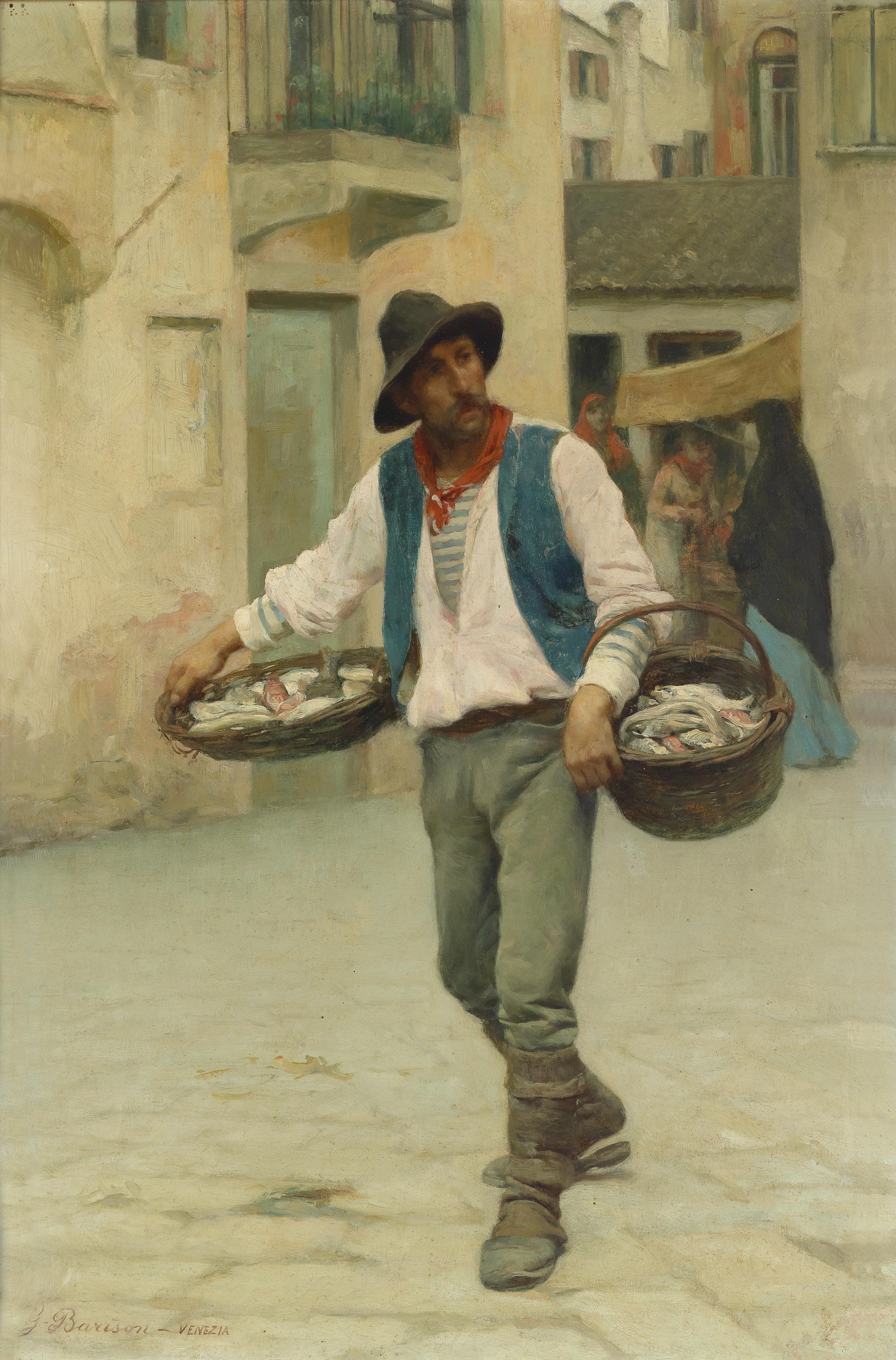
Venetian fish seller by Giuseppe Barison, 1906

== See also ==
- Charlatan
- Joan Dant
- Quackery

== Bibliography ==
- Dolan, J.R. (1964), Yankee Peddlers of Early America.
- Spufford, M. (1981), Small Books and Pleasant Histories: Popular Fiction and its Readership in seventeenth Century England.
- Spufford, M. (1984), The Great Reclothing of Rural England: Petty Chapmen and their Wares in the Seventeenth Century.
- Wright, R.L. (1927), Hawkers and Walkers in Early America.
- Station Chief at Etymonline.com
- Peddler at Etymonline.com
