= Lanier (surname) =

Lanier is a surname. Notable people with the name include:

- Alex Lanier (born 2005), French badminton player
- Allen Lanier (1946–2013), American musician and original member of the band Blue Öyster Cult
- Anthony Lanier (born 1993), American football player
- Aubrey Lanier (1888–1936), American college football player
- Bob Lanier (politician) (1925–2014), American politician
- Bob Lanier (1948–2022), American basketball player and coach
- Carlotta Walls LaNier (born 1942), one of nine African American students who integrated Little Rock Central High School in 1957
- Cathy Lanier (born 1967), Chief of Police, Washington, D.C.
- Charles D. Lanier (1837–1926), American banker and railroad executive
- Chaz Lanier (born 2001), American basketball player
- Chloe Lanier (21st century), American actress
- Clement Lanier (died 1661), English musician
- Don Lanier (1936–2014), American songwriter and composer
- Edwin S. Lanier (1901–1983), American politician from North Carolina
- Emilia Lanier (1569–1645), English poet
- Farris Lanier Jr. (1949–2019), American R&B-funk singer, member of Lanier & Co.
- Hal Lanier (born 1942), American baseball player and manager
- J. Hicks Lanier (born c.1941), American businessman
- James Lanier (1800–1881), American financier
- James F. D. Lanier (1858–1928), American banker and sportsman
- Jaron Lanier (born 1960), American virtual reality developer
- Jerome Lanier (died 1659), English musician
- Jerry P. Lanier (born 1952), American diplomat
- John Lanier (died 1692), British Army general
- Kate Lanier, American screenwriter
- Ken Lanier (born 1959), American football player
- Khalia Lanier (born 1998), American volleyball player
- Lee Lanier, American computer animator
- Lyle H. Lanier (1903–1988), American psychologist and academic
- Mark Lanier (born 1960), American lawyer and teacher
- Max Lanier (1915–2007), American baseball player
- Nicholas Lanier the Elder (died 1612), French court musician
- Nicholas Lanier (1588–1666), English composer, singer, lutenist, and painter
- Rob Lanier (born 1968), American college basketball coach
- Randy Lanier (born 1954), American racing car driver
- Raphael Lanier (1900–1962), American diplomat
- Sartain Lanier (1909–1994), American businessman and philanthropist
- Sidney Lanier (1842–1881), American musician and poet
- Sterling E. Lanier (1927–2007), American science fiction writer and editor
- Steve D. Lanier (born 1966), American politician from New Mexico
- Susan Lanier (born 1947), American actress
- Thomas C. Lanier (19th century), Alabama planter and Confederate soldier
- Virginia Lanier (1930–2003), American mystery fiction writer
- W. H. Lanier (1855–1929), American educator
- Willie Lanier (born 1945), American football player
