= Cudworth (surname) =

- Pronunciation: English: /ˈkʊdwɜːrθ/ (Generally); English: /ˈkʊdɜːrθ/ CUD-erth (Yorkshire)
- Language: English

Origin
- Language: English
- Meaning: "Cutha’s homestead”

Other names
- Variant forms: Cutworth, Cadworth, Cudwerth, Cudwarth, Cudwirth, Cuttworth, Cotworth, Cadorath, Cadoreth, Gutworth

Cudworth is an English locational surname, of Old English origin, deriving from the locations of Cudworth in Yorkshire, Somerset or Surrey. although the Yorkshire location is the most likely.

John de Cudworth (d.1384) married Margery the daughter of Richard de Oldham (lord of the manor of Werneth, Oldham, Lancashire) and the Cudworths were lords of the manor until 1683. Ralph Cudworth (1572/3–1624) was the son of Ralph Cudworth (d.1572) of Werneth Hall, Oldham.

== Surname ==
=== Ralph Cudworth (1617–1688) and family ===
- Damaris Cudworth Masham (1659–1708), English writer, theologian, and proto-feminist (daughter)
- James Cudworth (c.1612–1682), American colonist and Deputy Governor of Plymouth Colony (brother)
- Ralph Cudworth (1572/3–1624), English Anglican clergyman, royal chaplain, and theologian (father)
- Ralph Cudworth (1617–1688), English Anglican clergyman, Christian Hebraist, Classicist, theologian and philosopher

=== Others ===
- Andrew Gordon Cudworth (1939–1982), English physician and medical researcher
- Cyril "Charles" Leonard Elwell Cudworth (1908–1977), English librarian and musicologist
- Eddie Cudworth (1911–1990), Canadian long-distance runner
- Edward Aldrich Cudworth (1861–1937), American architect
- Henry Cudworth (1873–1914), English cricketer
- James I'Anson Cudworth (1817–1899), Locomotive Superintendent of the South Eastern Railway
- James Alaric Cudworth (1858–1943), professional baseball player
- Tom Cudworth (b.1964), American screenwriter

== Given name ==
- Colonel Benjamin Cudworth Yancey Jr. (1817–1891), American lawyer, politician, soldier, and diplomat
- Norman Cudworth Armitage (1907–1972), American saber fencer

== See also ==
- Cudworth (disambiguation)
