= Cudworth =

Cudworth may refer to:

== Places ==
- Cudworth, Saskatchewan, Canada
- Cudworth, Somerset, England
- Cudworth, South Yorkshire, England
- Cudworth, Surrey, England
- Cudworth Manor, Surrey, England
- Cudworth Airport, Saskatchewan, Canada
- Cudworth Municipal Airport, Saskatchewan, Canada
- Cudworth railway station, Cudworth, South Yorkshire, England

== People ==
- Cudworth (surname)
- Georgie Cudworth - fictional character in "Dangerfield (TV series)"
- Benjamin Cudworth Yancey Jr. (1817–91), American lawyer, politician, soldier, and diplomat
- Norman Cudworth Armitage (1907–72), American saber fencer

== Organisations ==
- Cudworth and Woodworth, architectural firm, Norwich, Connecticut, United States
- Cudworth Village F.C., football club, South Yorkshire, England
