= Lucy Anderson (musician) =

English pianist

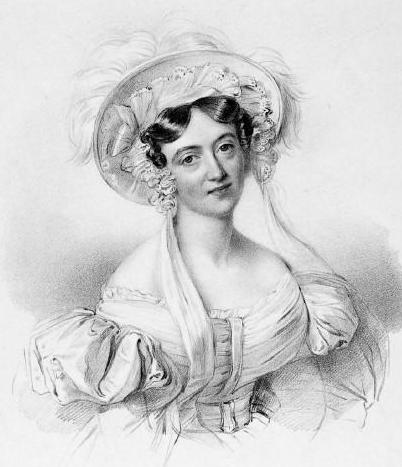
- Lithograph by Richard James Lane
- Born: 18 February 1795
- Died: 24 December 1878 (aged 83)

Lucy Anderson (bap. 18 February 1795 – 24 December 1878) was an English pianist of the early Victorian era. She is mentioned in the same breath as English pianists of the calibre of William Sterndale Bennett.

She was baptised Lucy Philpot in Bath, Somerset on 18 February 1795 at Walcot St. Swithin, the daughter of John Philpot and Lucy Crouch. Her father was a music seller, who is also described as "a professor of music" or "an obscure double bass player". Grove has it that her sister Fanny, a piano teacher, married into the Loder family, which was prominent in Bath's musical community. However, genealogical research suggests that this was in fact Frances Elizabeth Mary Kirkham, step-daughter of Lucy's sister, Jane Harriet Philpot, who became the wife of flautist George Loder, the brother of violinist John David Loder. Lucy had lessons from her cousin, a Mr. Windsor of Bath, and from William Crotch. She first achieved recognition as a pianist in Bath, moving to London in 1818. In July 1820 she married a well-known violinist, George Frederick Anderson.

Lucy Anderson was the first woman pianist to play at the Philharmonic Society concerts. She appeared 19 times between 1822 and 1862, and was the first pianist to play Beethoven's "Emperor" Concerto with the society. She championed Beethoven's concertos and played them more often than any other English pianist up to 1850. In 1843, she was piano soloist in Beethoven's Choral Fantasy, conducted by Ignaz Moscheles. In 1869 she became an honorary member of the Royal Philharmonic Society, a rarely awarded honour.

In 1830, Johann Nepomuk Hummel composed a "Grand Military Septet" in C major, Op. 114, for violin, cello, double bass, flute, clarinet, trumpet and piano. One source says this was dedicated to Lucy Anderson, although another says it was dedicated to Madame Adolphe de Lanneau.

In 1837 the publisher Alfred Novello gave Lucy Anderson exclusive rights for six months to play Felix Mendelssohn's Piano Concerto No. 2 in England. This was a condition of an interest-free loan of £30 from her husband, the money being needed by Novello to publish the concerto.

She is described as "formidable" and "a manipulator of wide patronage". Two queens appointed her as their pianist, Queen Adelaide in 1832 and Queen Victoria in 1837, Anderson having been Victoria's piano teacher from 1834 or earlier. She taught the piano to Victoria's children, as well as to other high-born ladies. She was a teacher of Arabella Goddard.

In 1848 her husband George Frederick Anderson was appointed Master of the Queen's Music. Lucy Anderson retired in 1862, and died in London on 24 December 1878.

Her portrait by Richard James Lane is in the National Portrait Gallery.

== Sources ==
- Grove's Dictionary of Music, 5th ed. 1954
