= Anthony Bassano =

Italian musician

Anthony Bassano was a 16th-century Italian musician.

== Early life and music career ==
Bassano, born in Bassano del Grappa, Italy, was one of six sons of Jeronimo Bassano (Anthony, Jacomo, [Alvise, Jasper, John and Baptista) who moved from Venice to England to the household of Henry VIII to serve the court, probably in 1540. Of his ten children, the five sons (Mark Anthony, Arthur, Edward, Andrea and Jeronimo) all served as musicians to the court of Henry VIII, and a daughter (Lucreece Bassano) married Nicholas Lanier the Elder, grandfather of the artist-musician Nicholas Lanier.

The historian A.L. Rowse in his correspondence to The Times in 1973 claimed that the Bassanos were Jewish and Dr. David Lasocki of Indiana University claimed in his 1995 book that the family were converted Jews. However, Giulio M. Ongaro in his "New Documents on the Bassano Family" in Early Music and Alessio Ruffatti argued that the Bassanos who moved to England might not have been Jewish.

Besides being wind players in the King's band, the Bassanos were also instrument makers.

== Personal life ==
Anthony was recorded as a foreigner, formerly Queen Elizabeth's musician, resident in the London parish of St Olave and All Hallows Staining, in 1607. He was married with ten children, all born in England.
