= George Frederick Anderson =

British violinist and Master of the Queen's Music

George Frederick Anderson (14 December 1793 – 14 December 1876) was a British violinist and Master of the Queen's Music.

Anderson was born in London in 1793. He was engaged as violinist in a variety of orchestras. In July 1820 he married the pianist Lucy Philpot, who, as Mrs Anderson, taught the piano to Queen Victoria and her children.

In 1837, in return for his providing the publisher Alfred Novello with an interest-free loan of £30 in order to publish Felix Mendelssohn's Piano Concerto No. 2, Novello gave his wife Lucy Anderson exclusive rights for six months to play the concerto in England.

In 1840 he became the Treasurer of the Royal Philharmonic Society, a position he held until his death. By 1841 he was a professor of music.

In 1848 he was appointed Master of the Queen's Music by Queen Victoria, succeeding Franz Cramer. He is not recorded as having composed any music, an activity normally associated with this appointment. He remained in the post until 1870; the circumstances of his departure are not known. Until the ten-year fixed-term appointment of Sir Peter Maxwell Davies in 2004, Anderson was the last Master of the Queen's Music to leave the post before his death, and the first since Nicholas Staggins in 1700.

He died on 14 December 1876 and was buried in Kensal Green Cemetery. A collection of his correspondence with musicians and composers is in the British Library.

== Sources ==
- Grove's Dictionary of Music and Musicians, 5th ed. 1954 (Master of the Queen's Music article)

Court offices
Preceded by Franz Cramer	Master of the Queen's Music; 1848–1870	Succeeded by William Cusins
