= Lanier House =

Lanier House may refer to the following places in the United States:

- Sidney Lanier Cottage, Macon, Georgia, NRHP-listed
- Lanier Mansion, Madison, Indiana, NRHP-listed
- Lanier House (Magnolia, Mississippi), listed on the NRHP in Pike County, Mississippi
- James F. D. Lanier Residence, New York, New York, NRHP-listed

== See also ==
- Lanier (disambiguation)
