= George F. Anderson =

George F. Anderson may refer to:

- George Frederick Anderson (1793–1876), British violinist and Master of the Queen's Music
- George F. Anderson, member of the South Dakota State Senate in 1905
