= Lanier =

Lanier is a surname.

== People ==
- Lanier (surname), a list of people with the name

== Places in the United States ==
- Lanier, Florida, an unincorporated community
- Lanier, Georgia, an unincorporated community
- Lanier County, Georgia
- Lake Lanier, an artificial lake on the Chattahoochee River, Georgia
- Lanier Mansion, Madison, Indiana, home of James F. D. Lanier

== Schools in the United States ==
- Lanier Middle School (Houston), Houston, Texas
- Lanier Middle School (Buford, Georgia), Buford, Georgia
- Lanier Middle School (Fairfax, Virginia), Fairfax, Virginia
- Sidney Lanier High School, Montgomery, Alabama
- Lanier High School (Austin, Texas), Austin, Texas
- Lanier High School (Jackson, Mississippi), Jackson, Mississippi
- Lanier High School, Macon, Georgia (now part of Central High School)
- Lanier University, a short-lived Baptist, then KKK-run, university in Atlanta, Georgia
- Lanier Technical College, Gainesville, Georgia

== Other uses ==
- USS Lanier, a US Navy attack transport ship which served in World War II
- Lanier, a brand of printers (subsidiary of Ricoh)
