= Master of the King's Music =

Post in the British monarchy

Master of the King's Music (or Master of the Queen's Music, or earlier Master of the King's Musick) is a post in the Royal Household of the United Kingdom. The holder of the post originally served the monarch of England, directing the court orchestra and composing or commissioning music as required.

The post is broadly comparable to that of poet laureate. It is given to people eminent in the field of classical music; they have almost always been composers. Duties are not clearly stated, though it is generally expected the holder of the post will write music to commemorate important royal events, such as coronations, birthdays, anniversaries, marriages and deaths, and to accompany other ceremonial occasions. The individual may also act as the sovereign's adviser in musical matters. Since 2004 the appointment has been for a fixed term of ten years rather than for life, as previously.

== The King's Musick ==
In the 14th century professional music-making in England was theoretically regulated by the Crown. Musicians known as the "King's Minstrels" or the "King's Musick" wore the royal livery and exercised some control of other musicians, although the musicologist Leonard Duck describes that control as "nominal".

Henry VI appointed a Royal Commission to regulate unlicensed minstrelsy and in 1469 Edward IV granted the royal minstrels a Guild charter. According to the charter, "no Minstrel of our Kingdom ... shall henceforth in any way practise or publicly exercise the art or occupation within our Kingdom aforesaid, unless he belong to the said Brotherhood or Guild". This led to legal difficulties between the royal minstrels and the City Company under the patronage of the City of London, chartered by James I in 1604 to perform in the City and three miles (five kilometres) outside it. The King's Minstrels requested and received a charter from Charles I in 1635 to "have the survey, scrutinie, correction and government of all and singular the musicians within the kingdome of England".

== First Masters of the King's Musick ==
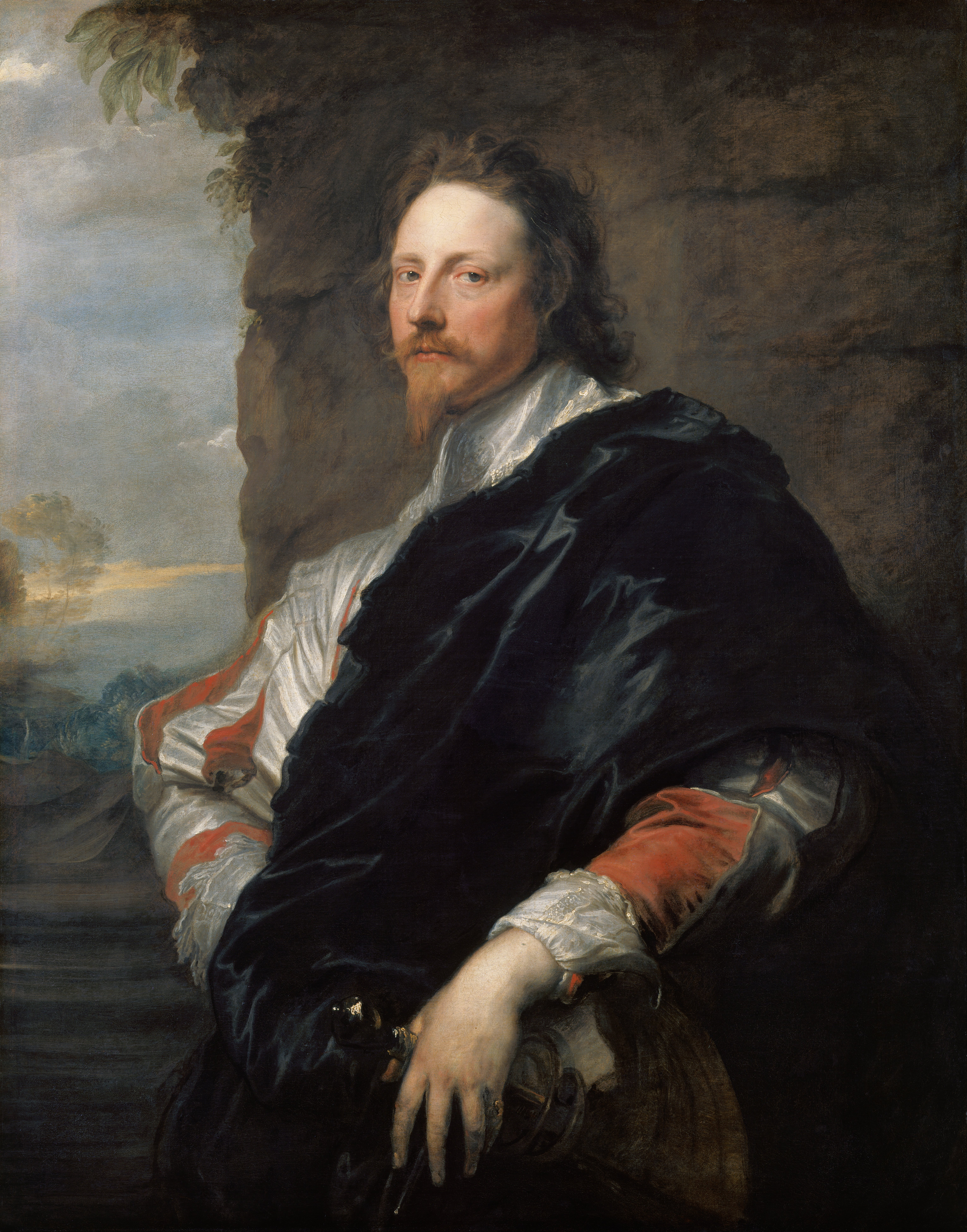
The first appointed Master of the King's Musick, Nicholas Lanier

The first appointed Master of the King's Musick was the only one seriously to attempt to rule all the musicians in the kingdom as a guild. This was Nicholas Lanier, appointed by Charles I in 1626 as Master of the King's Musick (the spelling was changed to "Music" in the 20th century, during Sir Edward Elgar's tenure). At that time the holder of the post took charge of the monarch's private band, a responsibility which continued until the band was dissolved in 1901 by Edward VII.

The position lapsed during the period of military rule following the Civil War, but on the restoration of the monarchy in 1660 Lanier returned from exile to resume the revived post. After Lanier's death in 1666, Charles II appointed a French violinist, Louis Grabu, to the post. Grabu was primarily concerned with organising the music for the court, and the Westminster musicians' guild fell into decline, coming to an end after 1697. Neither Grabu nor his successor Nicholas Staggins, who served from 1674 to 1700, was a talented composer; they turned to established composers such as Henry Purcell to supply music for important occasions.

== 18th century ==
Staggins was succeeded by John Eccles, who was appointed by William III in June 1700. Eccles was the longest-serving Master, holding the post for 35 years; he is also the only one to have served under four monarchs (William III, Anne, George I and George II). He was already a well-known composer before his appointment, described by Grove's Dictionary of Music and Musicians as "undoubtedly the greatest of the Restoration theatre composers" after Purcell. He nevertheless continued his predecessors' practice of commissioning works from other composers; George Frideric Handel in particular was given multiple commissions, including the Ode for the Birthday of Queen Anne (1713) and the coronation anthems for the coronation of George II in 1727. Duck comments that Handel's eminence as a composer "evidently did not qualify him as a suitable candidate for the honour of Master of the King's Music – the Hanoverian kings clearly played safe by choosing musicians of unimpeachable native breeding".

After Eccles's death in 1735, his post was filled by Maurice Greene, who already held the posts of organist of St Paul's Cathedral and organist and composer of the Chapel Royal. He held the post for twenty years, but his health was never robust, and he frequently called upon his former pupil William Boyce to compose music for the birthday and New Year odes written by the Poet Laureate in honour of the King. After Greene died in December 1755, Boyce succeeded him as Master of the King's Musick, and later in the Chapel Royal appointment. It was probably in the latter capacity rather than the former that Boyce provided what Grove calls "an imposing and deeply felt orchestral anthem" for the funeral of George II on 11 November 1760, "a splendid setting of 'The King shall rejoice"' for the wedding of King George III and Princess Charlotte on 8 September 1761, and eight anthems for the coronation of the King later in the same month.

Boyce died in 1779, and was succeeded as Master by another former pupil of Greene, John Stanley, who held the post until he died in 1786. He composed fifteen birthday and New Year odes, but none of them have survived. The last Master appointed in the 18th century was Sir William Parsons. He was viewed by his contemporaries as an affable man but a musician of limited ability, although his court music cannot be assessed, having mostly been lost. He is believed to be the first professional musician to have been knighted in Britain, although it was said that the honour was more for "the score of his merits than because of the merits of his scores".

== 19th century ==
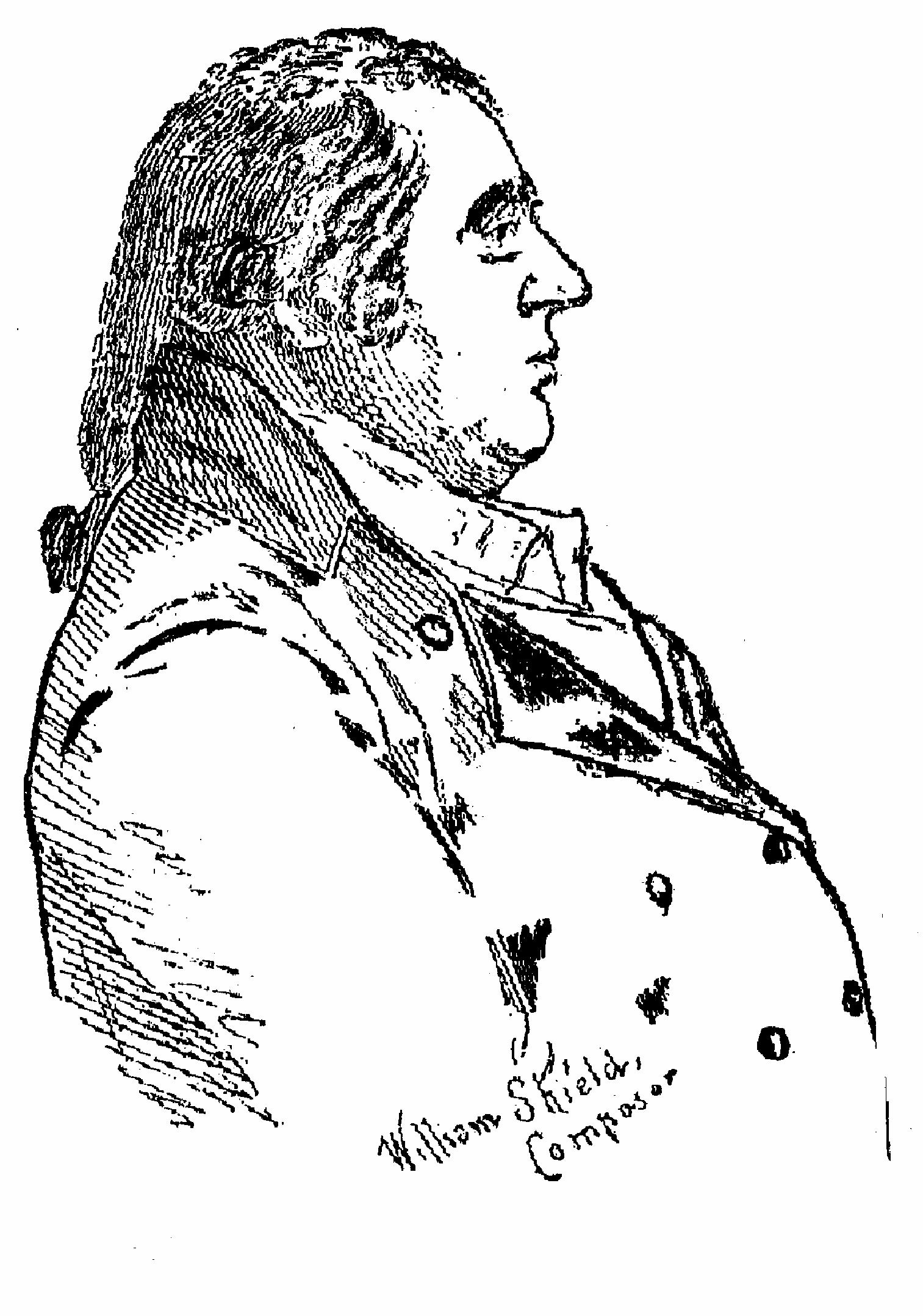
William Shield, Master, 1817–29

Parsons held the post of Master until 1817, when he was succeeded by William Shield, best known as a theatre composer: he composed or arranged music for at least thirty-six operas and seven pantomimes and ballets. Shield's tenure is most notable for the abandonment of the traditional provision of court odes. By custom, the Poet Laureate of the day wrote the words for the odes, a task that the then holder, Robert Southey, found uncongenial. After the death of George III in 1820 the odes were discontinued. The post of Master of the King's Musick continued because George IV maintained the traditional small orchestra, which Shield's successor, Christian Kramer, directed. That remained the chief function of the Master through the tenures of Franz Cramer (Master 1834–48), George Frederick Anderson (Master 1848–70), and Sir William Cusins (Master 1870–93). The last of these produced a few works for royal occasions, including a jubilee cantata, "Grant the Queen a Long Life" (1887).

The last Master appointed in the 19th century was Sir Walter Parratt, organist of St George's Chapel, Windsor. His tenure lasted thirty-one years from 1893, under the reigns of three monarchs – Queen Victoria, Edward VII and George V. In Duck's view, Parratt's role was chiefly that of musical adviser to the Crown. Among his actions in that capacity were inviting Elgar to set A. C. Benson's verses as a Coronation Ode for Edward VII in 1901, and writing an anthem for the anniversary of Queen Victoria's death in 1909. Parratt's own official compositions included a contribution to a collection of choral songs by various composers in honour of Queen Victoria and a Confortare for the coronation service of Edward VII.

== 20th century ==
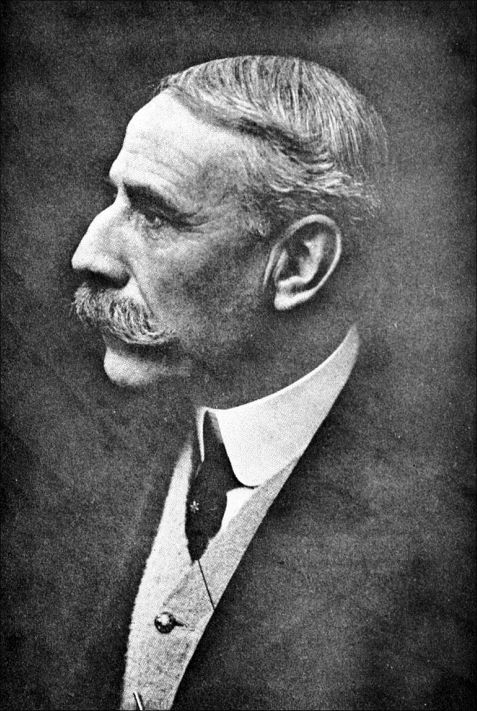
Sir Edward Elgar, Master, 1924–34

After Parratt's death in 1924, there was a body of opinion that the position of Master was an anachronism, with neither a royal band to direct nor regular royal odes to compose. Elgar, who was well regarded by the royal family, pressed the case for retaining the post. According to the music writer Nicholas Kenyon, he also "lobbied shamelessly" for his own candidacy for it. Other names, including that of Ralph Vaughan Williams had been suggested, but George V and his advisers took the view that "if the post is to go to the most eminent musician it would hardly be possible to go beyond Elgar." Elgar's appointment was announced in May 1924; The Times commented, "it is entirely fitting that in the changed condition of the office he should be made Master of the King's Musick and the Musician Laureate of the British people." Elgar was not required to write any official music in his new capacity, but in 1931, he dedicated his Nursery Suite to the Duchess of York and her two daughters. He used his influence as Master to track down the original instruments of Edward VII's band, to ensure the royal music library was well ordered, and to secure recognition for other musicians, including a knighthood for Granville Bantock and the Companion of Honour for Frederick Delius. As musical aide to the King he gave advice about such topics as the foundation of a national opera company, the correct version of the national anthem to be broadcast by the BBC, and the musical events at which members of the royal family should be present.

Elgar died in 1934. He was succeeded by Sir Walford Davies, organist of St George's Chapel, Windsor, who had been rumoured to be in the running for the post in 1924. In a 1966 retrospective of the various Masters, Charles Cudworth wrote that Davies was "a fine musician, a good composer, and was even better-known as one of the world's first great broadcasters, so the appointment was popular." When Davies died in 1941, Sir Arnold Bax replaced him, to the surprise of many in the musical world, given his strong affinities with Ireland, and no record of writing occasional music. Bax did write a few pieces for royal occasions, including a march for the coronation of Elizabeth II.

Bax died in 1953; many expected his successor to be Sir William Walton, but to Walton's own relief the post went to Sir Arthur Bliss. In The Times, the critic Frank Howes commented, "The duties of a Master of the Queen's Music are what he chooses to make of them, but they include the composition of ceremonial and occasional music". Bliss, who composed quickly and with facility, was able to discharge the calls on him as Master, providing music as required for state occasions, from the birth of a child to the Queen, and the funeral of Winston Churchill, to the investiture of Charles, Prince of Wales.

When Bliss died in 1975, Walton and others lobbied for the appointment of Malcolm Arnold. There was some surprise that Bliss's actual successor was the Australian composer Malcolm Williamson; Walton attributed the appointment to the need for "cementing the cracks in the Commonwealth". Williamson held the post from 1975 until his death in 2003, composing works including Lament in Memory of Lord Mountbatten of Burma (1980), Ode for Queen Elizabeth (1980), and Songs for a Royal Baby (1985).

== 21st century ==
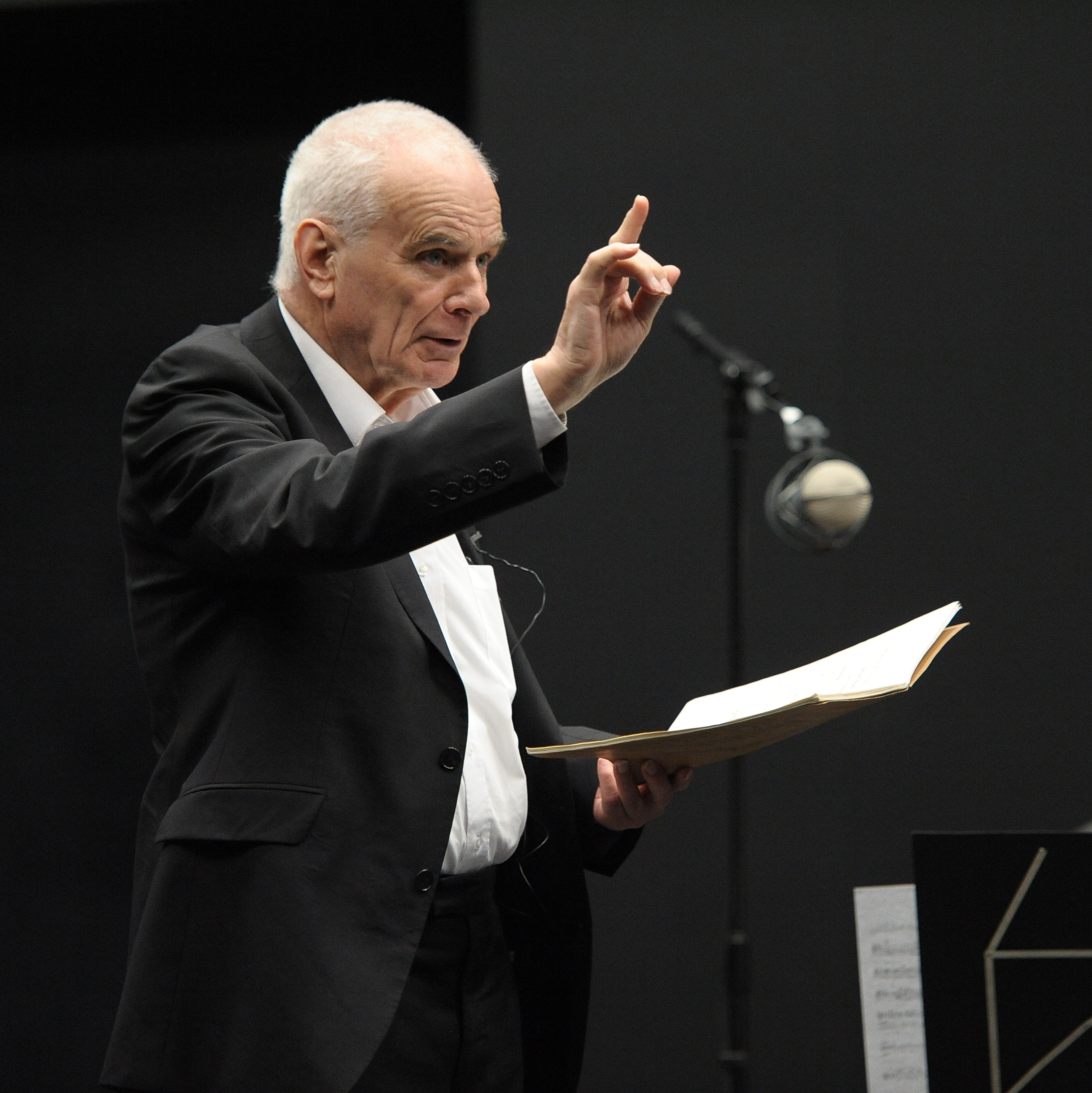
Sir Peter Maxwell Davies

Sir Peter Maxwell Davies was appointed to the Mastership in 2004 in succession to Williamson. For the first time the appointment was for a fixed, ten-year, term rather than for life, with the aim of making the post more attractive to composers. Maxwell Davies' work as Master included a Christmas carol for the Queen which was recorded by the Chapels Royal, and a work to accompany a poem by the Poet Laureate, Andrew Motion, to mark the Queen's eightieth birthday in 2006. He played a key role in the creation of the Queen's Medal for Music.

After the end of Maxwell Davies' term, Judith Weir was appointed in 2014, again for a ten-year term. Reporting the appointment, The Guardian said that rather than only writing pieces for royal occasions,

Weir would concentrate on supporting and speaking up for her composer colleagues, challenging the function that contemporary music fulfils in society, and embarking on a nationwide exploration of the state of music education in order to create pieces that will be useful for schoolchildren and amateur musicians.

However, Weir has composed several works for state events, including The True Light for the First World War centenary in 2018, By Wisdom for the Platinum Jubilee and Like as the hart for the Queen's state funeral.

In 2024, Errollyn Wallen was the first appointment to the office by King Charles III.

== Office holders ==
Name	Year appointed	Year of death	Comments	Monarch served	Monarch's title
Nicholas Lanier	1625	*	* The post was abolished in 1649 when the monarchy was overthrown, and reinstituted in 1660.	Charles I	King/Queen of England
Nicholas Lanier	1660	1666	* The post was abolished in 1649 when the monarchy was overthrown, and reinstituted in 1660.	Charles II (d. 1685)	King/Queen of England
Louis Grabu	1666	(after 1693)	Grabu seems to have fallen foul of the Test Act, passed in spring 1673 and enforced on 18 November, which banned all Catholics from court.	Charles II (d. 1685)	King/Queen of England
Nicholas Staggins	1674		Staggins died on 13 June 1700.	Charles II (d. 1685)	King/Queen of England
Nicholas Staggins	1685		Staggins died on 13 June 1700.	James II (Glorious Revolution 1688)	King/Queen of England
Nicholas Staggins	1688	1700	Staggins died on 13 June 1700.	William III and Mary II (joint monarchs; Mary d. 1694; William d. 1702)	King/Queen of England
John Eccles	1700		The longest-serving Master of the King's Musick (35 years) and the only one who served four monarchs.	William III and Mary II (joint monarchs; Mary d. 1694; William d. 1702)	King/Queen of England
John Eccles	1702		The longest-serving Master of the King's Musick (35 years) and the only one who served four monarchs.	Anne (d. 1714)	King/Queen of England
John Eccles	–		The longest-serving Master of the King's Musick (35 years) and the only one who served four monarchs.	Anne (d. 1714)	King/Queen of Great Britain (from 1707)
John Eccles	1714		The longest-serving Master of the King's Musick (35 years) and the only one who served four monarchs.	George I (d. 1727)	King/Queen of Great Britain (from 1707)
John Eccles	1727	1735	The longest-serving Master of the King's Musick (35 years) and the only one who served four monarchs.	George II (d. 1760)	King/Queen of Great Britain (from 1707)
Maurice Greene	1735	1755		George II (d. 1760)	King/Queen of Great Britain (from 1707)
William Boyce	1755			George II (d. 1760)	King/Queen of Great Britain (from 1707)
William Boyce	1760	1779		George III (d. 1820)	King/Queen of Great Britain (from 1707)
John Stanley	1779	1786		George III (d. 1820)	King/Queen of Great Britain (from 1707)
Sir William Parsons	1786			George III (d. 1820)	King/Queen of Great Britain (from 1707)
Sir William Parsons	–	1817		George III (d. 1820)	King/Queen of the United Kingdom of Great Britain and Ireland (from 1801)
William Shield	1817			George III (d. 1820)	King/Queen of the United Kingdom of Great Britain and Ireland (from 1801)
William Shield	1820	1829		George IV (d. 1830)	King/Queen of the United Kingdom of Great Britain and Ireland (from 1801)
Christian Kramer	1829			George IV (d. 1830)	King/Queen of the United Kingdom of Great Britain and Ireland (from 1801)
Christian Kramer	1830	1834		William IV (d. 1837)	King/Queen of the United Kingdom of Great Britain and Ireland (from 1801)
Franz Cramer	1834			William IV (d. 1837)	King/Queen of the United Kingdom of Great Britain and Ireland (from 1801)
Franz Cramer	1837	1848		Victoria (d. 1901)	King/Queen of the United Kingdom of Great Britain and Ireland (from 1801)
George Frederick Anderson	1848	(1876)	Anderson left the post in 1870.	Victoria (d. 1901)	King/Queen of the United Kingdom of Great Britain and Ireland (from 1801)
(Sir) William Cusins	1870	1893	Knighted in 1892; the only Master of the Queen's Musick to be knighted during his term of office.	Victoria (d. 1901)	King/Queen of the United Kingdom of Great Britain and Ireland (from 1801)
Sir Walter Parratt	1893			Victoria (d. 1901)	King/Queen of the United Kingdom of Great Britain and Ireland (from 1801)
Sir Walter Parratt	1901			Edward VII (d. 1910)	King/Queen of the United Kingdom of Great Britain and Ireland (from 1801)
Sir Walter Parratt	1910			George V (d. 1936)	King/Queen of the United Kingdom of Great Britain and Ireland (from 1801)
Sir Walter Parratt	–	1924		George V (d. 1936)	King/Queen of the United Kingdom of Great Britain and Northern Ireland (from 1922)
Sir Edward Elgar	1924	1934	The title of the office was changed from Master of the King's Musick to Master of the King's Music during Elgar's tenure.	George V (d. 1936)	King/Queen of the United Kingdom of Great Britain and Northern Ireland (from 1922)
Sir Walford Davies	1934		Davies was gazetted as "Master of the Music" (rather than "Musick").	George V (d. 1936)	King/Queen of the United Kingdom of Great Britain and Northern Ireland (from 1922)
Sir Walford Davies	1936 (January)		Davies was gazetted as "Master of the Music" (rather than "Musick").	Edward VIII (abd. Dec 1936)	King/Queen of the United Kingdom of Great Britain and Northern Ireland (from 1922)
Sir Walford Davies	1936 (December)	1941	Davies was gazetted as "Master of the Music" (rather than "Musick").	George VI (d. 1952)	King/Queen of the United Kingdom of Great Britain and Northern Ireland (from 1922)
Sir Arnold Bax	1942			George VI (d. 1952)	King/Queen of the United Kingdom of Great Britain and Northern Ireland (from 1922)
Sir Arnold Bax	1952	1953		Elizabeth II (d. 2022)	King/Queen of the United Kingdom of Great Britain and Northern Ireland (from 1922)
Sir Arthur Bliss	1953	1975		Elizabeth II (d. 2022)	King/Queen of the United Kingdom of Great Britain and Northern Ireland (from 1922)
Malcolm Williamson	1975	2003		Elizabeth II (d. 2022)	King/Queen of the United Kingdom of Great Britain and Northern Ireland (from 1922)
Sir Peter Maxwell Davies	2004	2016	Davies was appointed for a ten-year term, the first not appointed for life.	Elizabeth II (d. 2022)	King/Queen of the United Kingdom of Great Britain and Northern Ireland (from 1922)
Dame Judith Weir	2014		The first female holder of the office, also appointed for a ten-year term.	Elizabeth II (d. 2022)	King/Queen of the United Kingdom of Great Britain and Northern Ireland (from 1922)
Dame Judith Weir	2022		The first female holder of the office, also appointed for a ten-year term.	Charles III	King/Queen of the United Kingdom of Great Britain and Northern Ireland (from 1922)
Errollyn Wallen	2024		The first appointment to the office by King Charles III.	Charles III	King/Queen of the United Kingdom of Great Britain and Northern Ireland (from 1922)

== See also ==
- Kapellmeister

== Sources ==
- Brown, James Duff; Stratton, Stephen S. (1897). British Musical Biography. London: Reeves. OCLC 220666894.
- Kennedy, Michael (1989a). Notes to Elgar's The Nursery Suite and other short pieces. London: EMI. OCLC 36262885.
- Kennedy, Michael (1989b). Portrait of Walton. Oxford: Oxford University Press. ISBN 978-0-19-816705-1.
- Kenyon, Nicholas (2008). Elgar: An Anniversary Portrait. London: Continuum. ISBN 978-1-84706-533-9.
- Moore, Jerrold Northrop (1984). Edward Elgar: a Creative Life. Oxford and New York: Oxford University Press. ISBN 978-0-19-315447-6.
- Moore, Jerrold Northrop (1990). Edward Elgar: Letters of a Lifetime. Oxford and New York: Oxford University Press. ISBN 978-0-19-315472-8.
- Wilson, Michael Ian (1994). Nicholas Lanier: Master of the King's Musick. Aldershot, UK: Scolar Press. ISBN 978-0-85967-999-2.
