= Senator Yancey =

Senator Yancey may refer to:

- Bartlett Yancey (1785–1828), North Carolina State Senate
- Benjamin Cudworth Yancey Jr. (1817–1891), Alabama State Senate
- Lee Yancey (born 1968), Mississippi State Senate
- William L. Yancey (1814-1863), Confederate States Senate
