= Jerome Lanier =

Jerome Lanier was an English musician, sackbut player, son of Nicholas Lanier the Elder, hence uncle of Nicholas Lanier, the artist-musician. Jerome Lanier was appointed in 1599 musician to court of Elizabeth I as Musician in Ordinary on woodwinds and sackbut replacing Mark Anthony Bassano, a post he held until 1643.

He lived in Greenwich, and was married twice:

1) Phrisdewith Grafton, daughter of William Grafton, who died in 1625; their children included William Lanier (born 1618; a musician).

2) Elizabeth Willeford in 1627.

Jerome Lanier purchased several paintings acquired for the King (Charles I) by his nephew Nicholas Lanier, in order to save them-- Clement Lanier also bought several; John Evelyn, in his Diary, noted seeing at "Old Jerome Laniere's, Greenwich, some pictures which surely had been the King's."

Jerome Lanier died in 1657, mentioning in his will his "poor little estate," most of which had been lost in the Civil War. Evelyn, in his "Memoires," noted him in the household of Elizabeth I, as a man "skilled in painting and carving."
