= Church of St Michael, Cudworth =

Church in Somerset, England

Church of St Michael
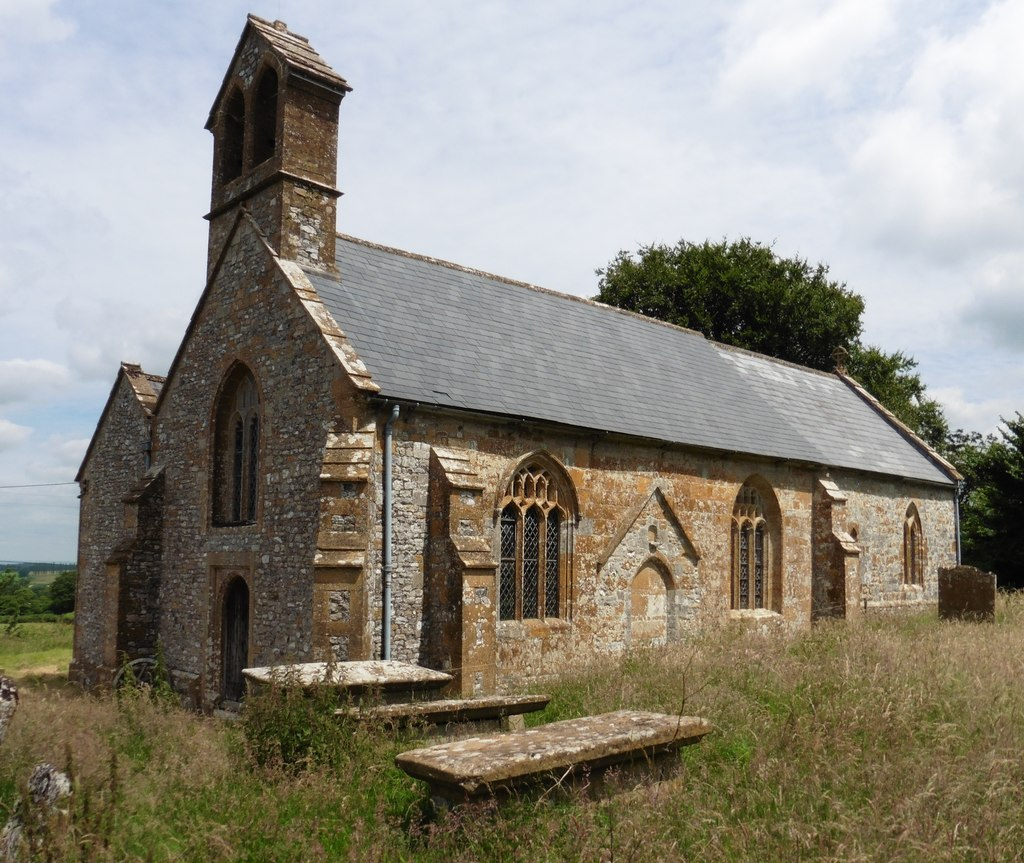

- Location within Somerset
- 50.8939°N 2.8927°W
- Location: Cudworth, Somerset, England

History
- Built: 12th century

Listed Building – Grade II*
- Official name: Church of St Michael
- Designated: 4 February 1958
- Reference no.: 1366403

The Anglican Church of St Michael in Cudworth, Somerset, England was built in the 12th century. It is a Grade II* listed building.

== History ==
The church was built in the 12th century, from which the north doorway and one small window remain. The nave and chancel are from the 13th century but were modified in the 14th and 15th.

The parish is part of the Winsmoor benefice within the Diocese of Bath and Wells.

== Architecture ==
The stone building has hamstone dressing and slate roofs with a bell turret at the western end. It has a three-bay nave, two-bay chancel and a north aisle.

Inside the church are a Jacobean pulpit and 13th-century font. The cylindrical font has a band of chip-carved satires around the top and stands on a cylindrical stem.

There are some fragments of medieval stained glass.

== See also ==
- List of ecclesiastical parishes in the Diocese of Bath and Wells
