= Franz Cramer =

English violinist and conductor

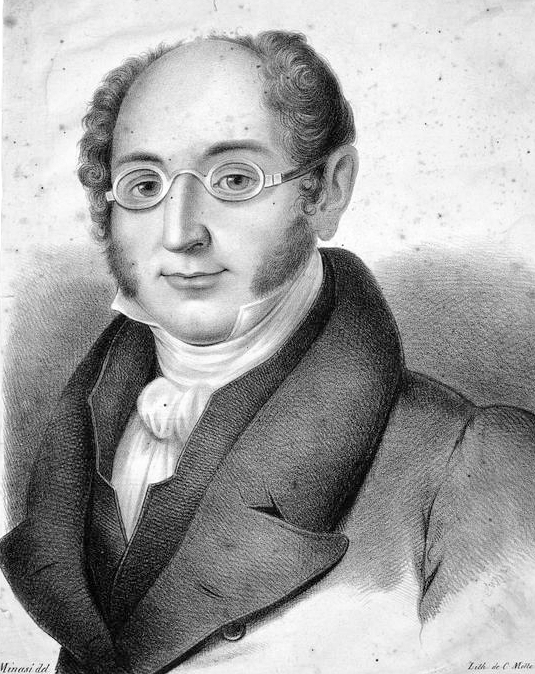
Franz Cramer

Franz Anton Dorotheus Cramer or François Cramer (12 June 1772 – 1 August 1848) was an English violinist and conductor who was Master of the King's/Queen's Musick from 1834 until his death.

He was born in either Mannheim or London, the son of Wilhelm Cramer and the brother of Johann Baptist Cramer. He was no doubt his father's pupil. Next to nothing seems to be known about his activities or compositions, yet he was appointed Master of the King's Musick in 1834, by King William IV, succeeding Christopher (or Christian) Kramer, who was no relation.

The king died in 1837, and Cramer continued as Master of the Queen's Musick to Queen Victoria. He did not contribute any music to her coronation, leading The Spectator to complain that he had been allowed "to proclaim to the world his inability to discharge the first, and the most grateful duty of his office — the composition of a Coronation Anthem".

He died in 1848 aged 76, and was succeeded by George Frederick Anderson.

The only composition of Cramer's that has survived is a Capriccio (Album Leaf) for violin, which is in manuscript in the British Museum.

== Sources ==
Court offices
Preceded by Christian Kramer	Master of the Queen's Music; 1834–1848	Succeeded by George Frederick Anderson
