= William Parsons (composer and musician) =

English composer (1745/6–1817)

Sir William Parsons
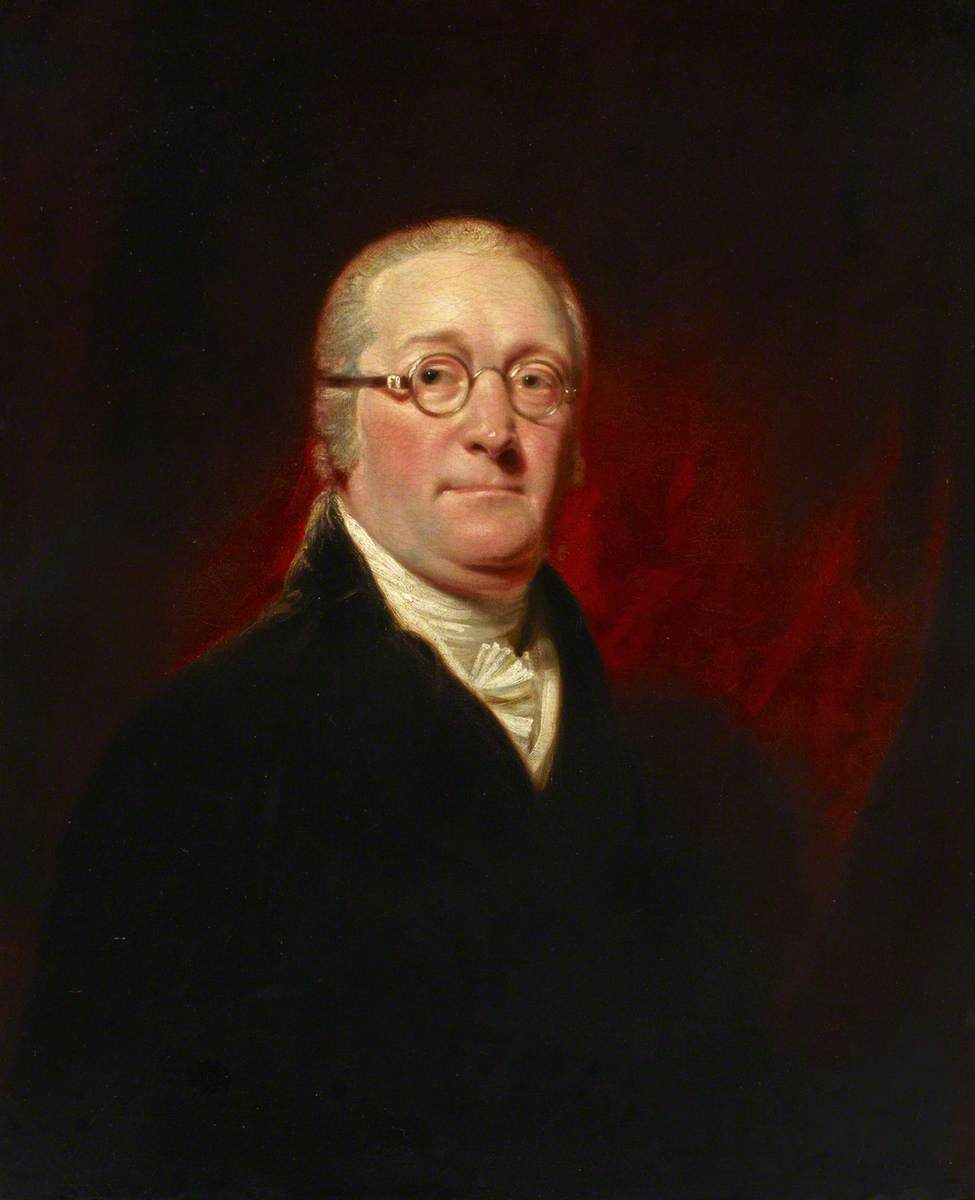
- Oil painting of Parsons, c. 1800
- Occupation: Music Composer

Sir William Parsons (1745/6–1817) was an English composer and musician who was Master of the King's Musick under George III between 1786 and 1817.

Originally a chorister at Westminster Abbey as a pupil of Benjamin Cooke, he developed a reputation as a fine tenor, but was passed over for another musician at the Royal Opera House, Covent Garden and thus went to Europe to seek employment. Returning to England, he was an assistant director at the George Frideric Handel commemorations in Westminster Abbey and the Pantheon in 1784, and composed a number of anthems for royal usage. He was an assistant director of the festival with many other prominent English composers at the time, such as Thomas Sanders Dupuis, Samuel Arnold, and his teacher, Benjamin Cooke. He gained a doctorate in music at Oxford University in 1790. In his spare time, he acted as a magistrate for the jurisdiction near his house in Portman Square.

He was knighted by the Lord Lieutenant of Ireland, John Jeffreys Pratt, second Earl Camden in 1795, thus becoming the first British musician honoured with a knighthood. An unremarkable composer and musician, he gained the title more through tutoring the king's family and his contacts than any merit, being a friend of several members of the royal family and composers such as Joseph Haydn. Few of his compositions survive.

Court offices
Preceded by John Stanley	Master of the King's Musick; 1786–1817	Succeeded by William Shield
