= William Cusins =

British musician (1833–1893)

Sir William George Cusins (14 October 1833 – 31 August 1893) was an English pianist, violinist, organist, conductor and composer. He served as Master of the Queen's Music from 1870 to 1893.

== Biography ==
Born in London, Cusins entered the Chapel Royal in his tenth year and studied music in Brussels under François-Joseph Fétis and later at the Royal Academy of Music (RAM) in London, under Cipriani Potter, William Sterndale Bennett, Charles Lucas and Prosper Sainton.

He toured widely, in England, Leipzig, Berlin and other places, as a concert pianist and as a composer. He was appointed organist to Queen Victoria's private chapel. He also played the violin in various orchestras in London. In 1851 he became assistant professor at the RAM, and later full professor. In 1867 he succeeded Sterndale Bennett as conductor of the Philharmonic Society and remained in this post until 1883.

He was appointed Master of the Queen's Musick by Queen Victoria in 1870, succeeding George Frederick Anderson, who had retired. He was knighted on 5 August 1892 (the only Master to be knighted during his term of office) and received the Cross of Isabella the Catholic in 1893.

He died at Remonchamps, Ardennes, France on 31 August 1893, of influenza, and was buried at Kensal Green, London.

== Works ==
Sir William Cusins produced editions of the piano music of Robert Schumann. Among his works as a composer are Royal Wedding Serenata (1863), concert overture Les Travailleurs de la mer (1869), the oratorio Gideon (produced Gloucester, 1871), overture to William Shakespeare's Love's Labour's Lost (1875), Piano Concerto in A minor, marches and songs.

Court offices
Preceded by George Frederick Anderson	Master of the Queen's Music; 1870–1893	Succeeded by Walter Parratt
