= William Shield =

English composer

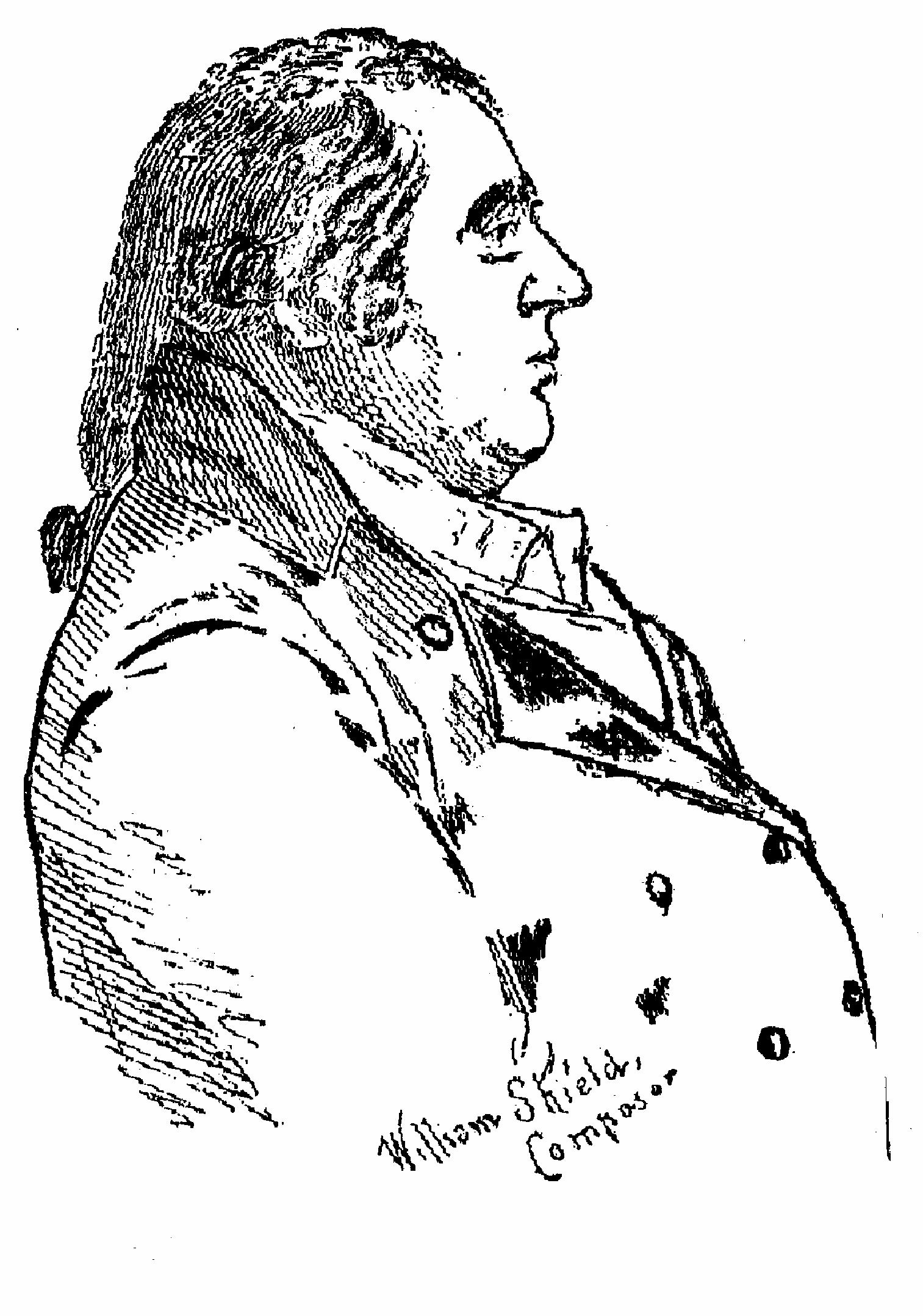
William Shield

William Shield (5 March 1748 – 25 January 1829) was an English composer, violinist and violist. His music earned the respect of Haydn and Beethoven.

== Life and musical career ==
Shield was born in Swalwell near Gateshead, County Durham, the son of William Shield and his wife, Mary, née Cash. He was first taught music by his father but, after both he and his mother died while Shield was still a child, he was apprenticed to a shipbuilder in South Shields, continuing however to study music with Charles Avison in Newcastle upon Tyne.

He became a noted violinist in Newcastle's subscription concerts before moving to Scarborough to lead a theatre orchestra. In 1772, he was appointed by Felice Giardini to play violin in the opera at Covent Garden (now the Royal Opera House), and from 1773 he was principal violist there. In 1778 he provided the music for the comic opera The Flitch of Bacon to a libretto by Henry Bate.

On 21 February 1776 he was in Durham, where he attended the meeting of the city's masonic lodge at the Marquis of Granby tavern. The lodge Minutes indicate that he was by this date already a member of the St. John's lodge in Newcastle. He later also became a member of the Sunderland Phoenix lodge No.94 and The Sea Captain's Lodge (later to become Palatine Lodge No.97), where he was admitted as a joining member on 14 June 1792. Details of the frequency of Shield's attendance at these north-east lodges is not yet clear, but can only have been occasional, given his career in London.

Shield also worked as a composer for Covent Garden and, in that capacity, he met Joseph Haydn. In 1817, he was appointed Master of the King's Musick. Like Haydn and Beethoven, not to mention several other composers of his time, Shield was a great plunderer of folk tunes (in his case mostly from his native Northumbria).

Shield's compositions include a large number of operas and other stage works. These included one on Robin Hood (1784), text by Macnally, as well as instrumental music, but he is principally known for his English light opera Rosina (1781). It was intended to be used as a light afterpiece to a more "serious" work sung in Italian. Such works were common at the time, although Rosina is the only one that has survived in the form of a complete score.

Rosina has a number of features associated with later English comic opera, and even modern musical comedy – including the use of English, spoken dialogue, lightness of theme, and the use of folk and popular medodies. At least to that degree, it may be regarded as one of the ancestors of the musical, and Shield as one of the first composers of musicals.

== Death and subsequent historical problems ==
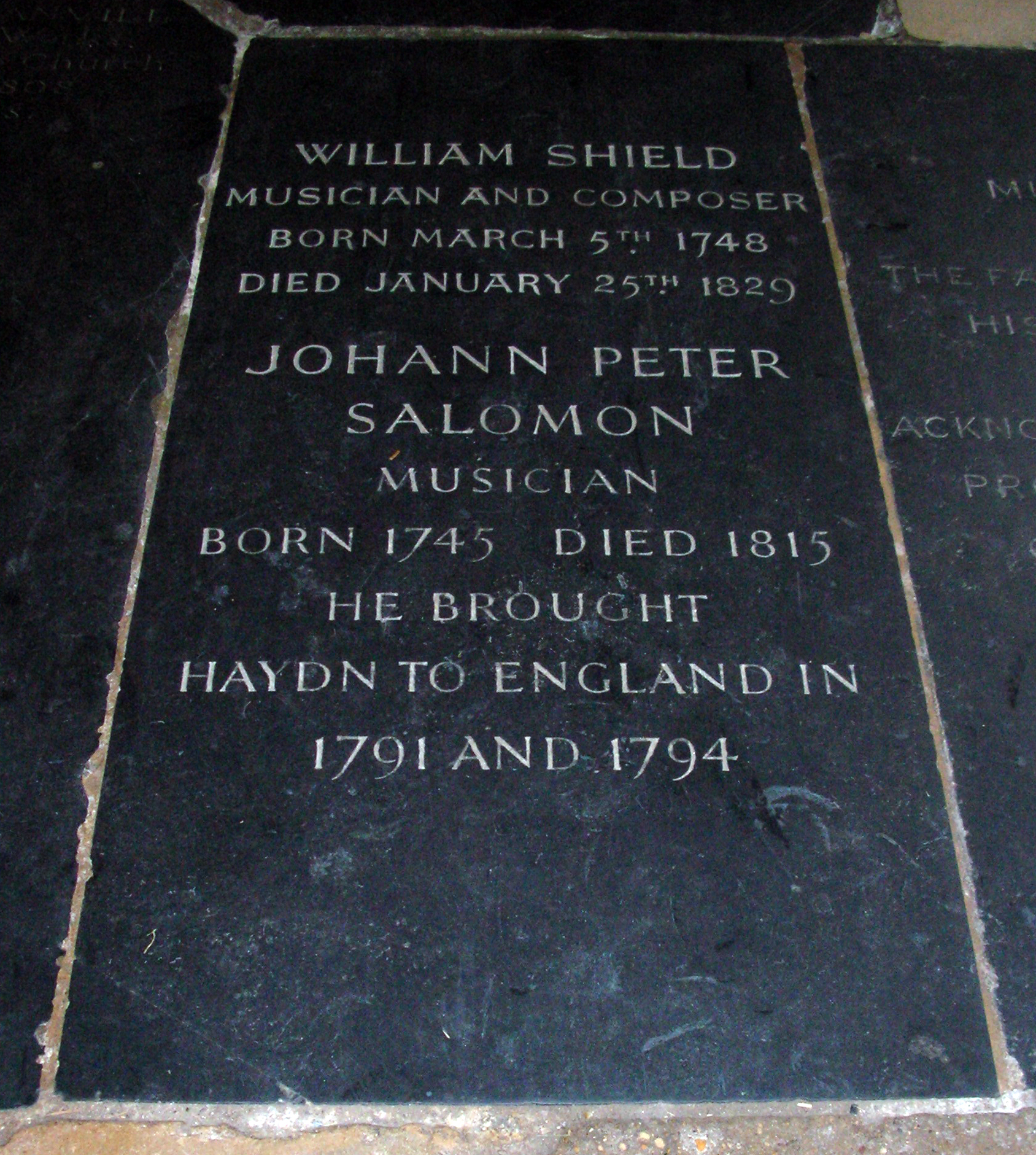
Memorial in south cloister of Westminster Abbey

William Shield died on Sunday 25 January 1829 (the date celebrated as Robbie Burns Day) at his house at 31 Berners Street, London. His will (dated 29 June 1826) left his worldly goods and a glowing testimonial "to my beloved partner, Ann, Mrs. Shield".

Victorian chroniclers skirted round the problem, but when the will was proved on 6 March 1829 the estate was claimed by, "Ann Stokes, alias Shield, Spinster, belonging to Marleybone".

His favourite violin was given to King George IV, who insisted that the full value be given to Ann. Within six months she also sold his library of music, but nothing more is known of her.

Shield is buried in the same grave as Johann Peter Salomon in the floor of the south cloisters of Westminster Abbey. It seems no marker of any kind was put in place at the time to show where he lay. There was quite a search made near the centenary of his death and eventually a small marble tablet was put as near the grave as could be ascertained.

William Shield Memorial Tablet, St Thomas à Beckett Church, Brightling, Sussex

John 'Mad Jack' Fuller commissioned sculptor Peter Rouw (1771–1852), of Portland Lane, London, to create a memorial to mark the grave of his friend William Shield in Westminster Abbey. Dr Ireland, Dean of the Abbey, is said to have refused permission for the tablet to be installed as he took objection to the word "gentleman" being used in its text. Fuller subsequently had the tablet installed at his home church, St Thomas à Becket, Brightling, Sussex where it remains. A medallion portrait of William Shield in profile is accompanied by this inscription:

Sacred to the memory of / WILLIAM SHIELD esquire / master of His Majesty's band of music / who died January 25th 1829 / aged 80 years / and is buried in Westminster Abbey / This gentleman's name[,] independent / of his high character and virtues / in private life[,] has a claim to be enroll'd / amongst the most eminent musical / composers that have hitherto prov'd / an ornament to the British nation / John Fuller of Rose Hill Esq, DDD.

It is presumed that the words, "and is buried in Westminster Abbey" were inserted. DDD is an abbreviation for the Latin Dat, Dicat, Dedicat which can be translated to "Gives, Devotes and Dedicates".

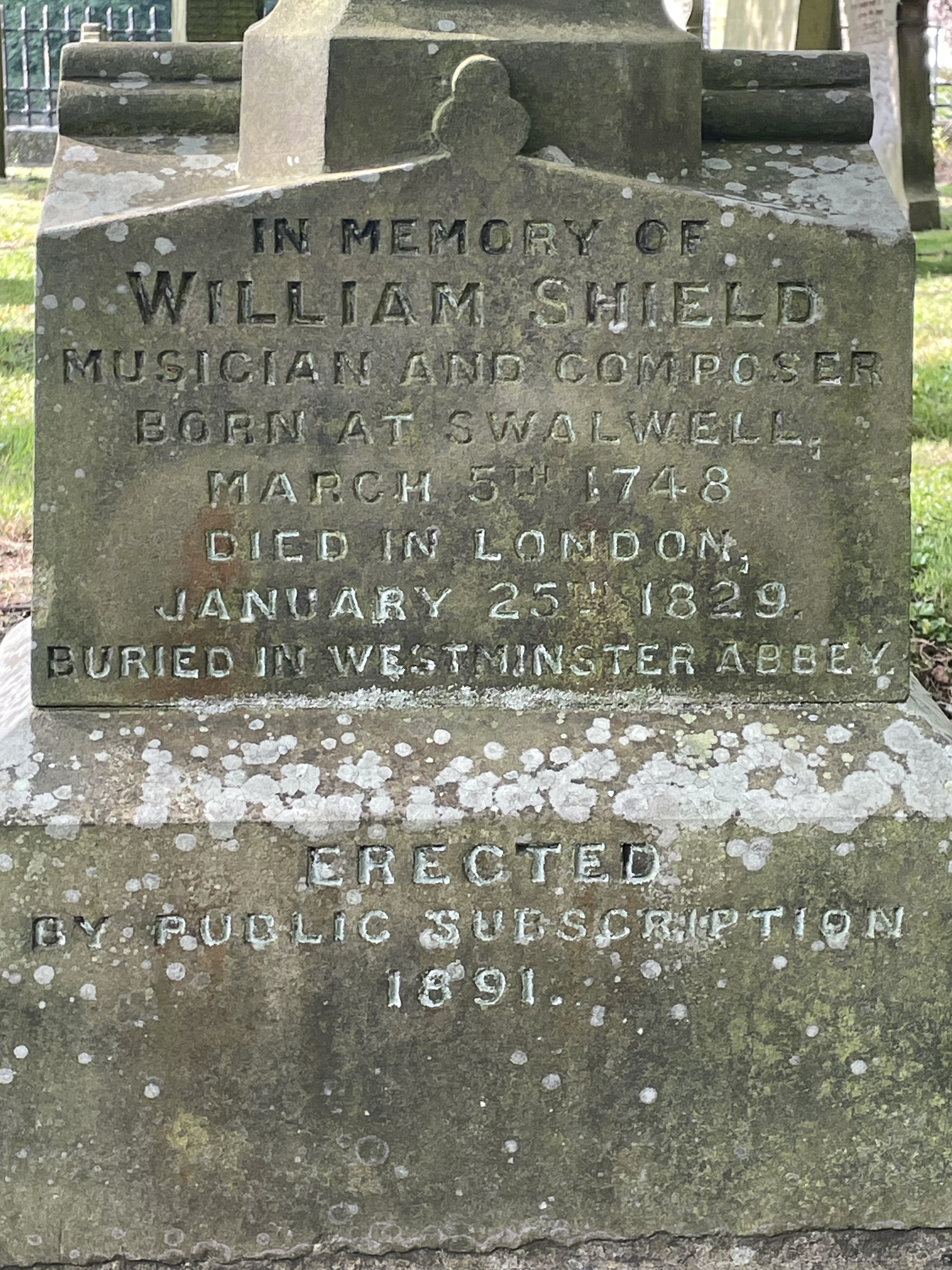
Gravestone at St Mary’s Whickham, Gateshead.

A memorial cross was erected to honour Shield in 1891 at Whickham Church, his native parish.

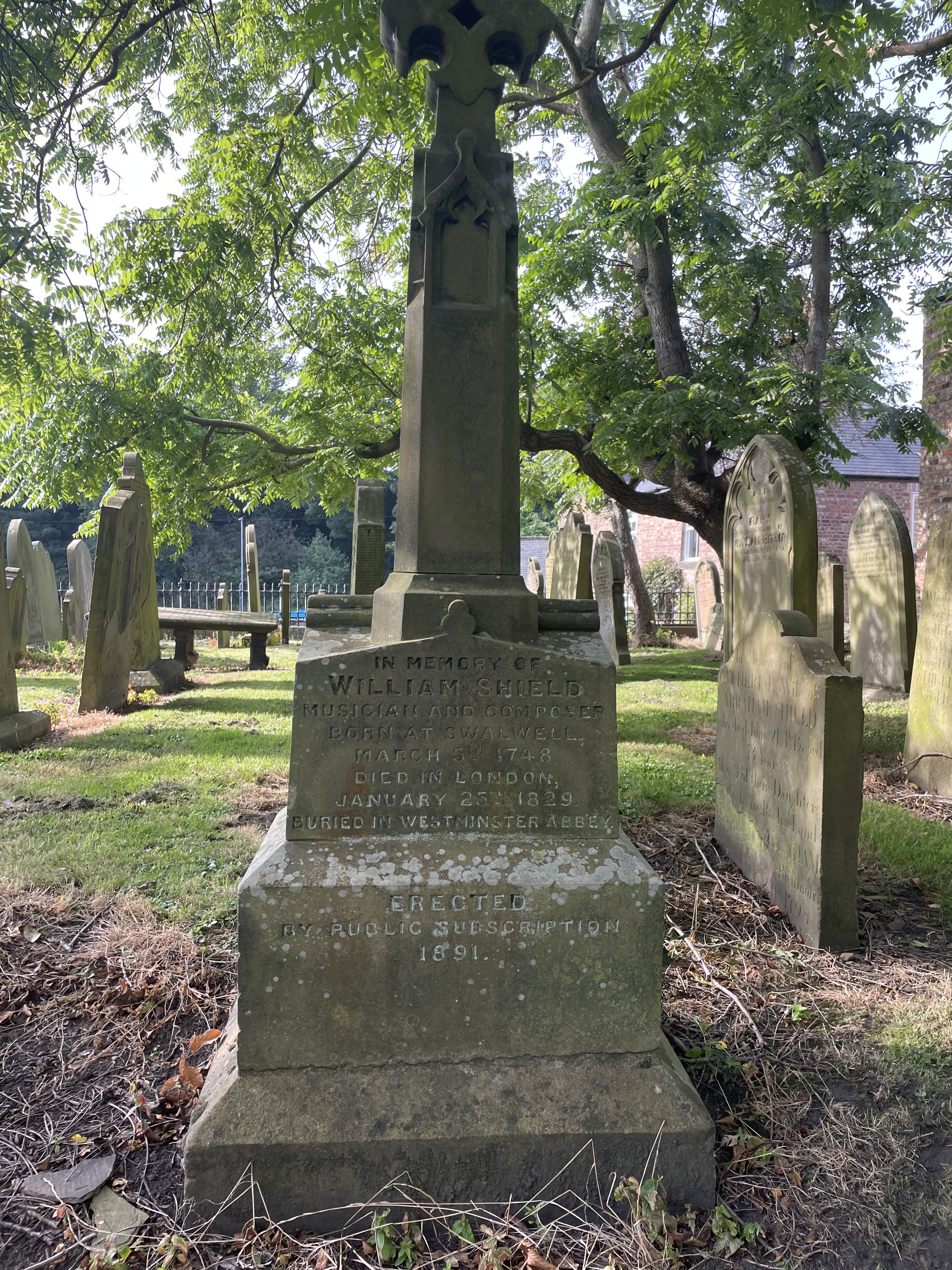
Full image of Cross Memorial for William Shield at St Mary’s Whickham, Gateshead

Near it is the oldest Shield grave. "Here lieth Peter Shield and Mary his wife, mother and children. Dep this life April Ye 8th 1747."

In December 2009, Gateshead Council erected a memorial to William Shield in Swalwell, Gateshead. It is close to the place where he was born, now a garage carrying out MOTs. In addition there is a room named the William Shield Room at the Gateshead Dryden Centre, home of the Gateshead Schools Music Service. The Gateshead Youth Orchestra regularly performs music by Shield, including the overtures to Rosina and The Travellers in Switzerland.

== The "Auld Lang Syne" controversy ==
The most recent revival of the "Shield wrote Auld Lang Syne" story seems to date from 1998, when John Treherne, Gateshead's Head of Schools' Music Service, uncovered an original edition of the opera Rosina in the Gateshead Public Library, while he was looking for new works for the town's youth orchestra. "I thought it was appropriate to look at the work of a Gateshead-born composer. I picked out Rosina by Shield," Treherne said. "I started to copy out the score and hummed the tune as I was writing it down. I was coming to the end when I realised the tune floating through my head was Auld Lang Syne."

Ballad operas generally quoted well known tunes, and in this case the tune is certainly much older. A fine and elaborate setting of an older tune with this name "For Old Lang Syne, by Mr. Beck", with variation appears in the Balcarres Lute Book, from Scotland. Here attributions such as "By Mr. Beck" are generally used to indicate the composer of the setting, not the underlying tune. This book was compiled around 1700, it has remained in the possession of the same family since its compilation, and it is now held by the National Library of Scotland. As variation sets are generally composed on recognisable tunes, this is very probably older still. A later appearance of this old tune, was published by William McGibbon, who died in 1756. While both of these settings are on the earlier tune, the opening bars are immediately recognisable. Probably the first printed appearances of the modern tune are first, Shield's use of it in Rosina. In the final allegro, what is essentially the modern form of the tune appears on the oboe; as this section contains Scotch snap rhythms, with a drone accompaniment on bassoon 'in imitation of bagpipes', it may well be that the use of this melody by Shield is also a quotation. Shield does not claim it as his own, as he does with some of the song tunes in the opera. Rosina premiered at the end of 1782. In 1784, Niel Gow published it, as Sir Alexander Don's Strathpey, in his Collection of Strathspey Reels. Like Shield, Gow does not claim to have composed it; it is closely related to older strathspeys such as Coming Through the Rye, and The Miller's Wedding.

== The William Shield Festival ==
A festival ran by Community Music Whickham & Swalwell is held each year with concerts promoting the music of Shield, his contemporaries and community music. A performance of one of Shield’s operas has been given annually since inception. To date these include Rosina, The Woodman, The Farmer, The Poor Soldier and Robin Hood all performed by Rocket Opera and the William Shield Festival Orchestra, led by Bradley Creswick, conducted by John Treherne.

== Recordings ==
- Rosina (only complete recording) Margreta Elkins – The Classic Recordings ABC 461 922-2 (also includes Sea Pictures by Edward Elgar and "The Altar is adorned for the Sacrifice" by Malcolm Williamson)

Court offices
Preceded by William Parsons	Master of the King's Musick; 1817–1829	Succeeded by Christian Kramer
