= Clement Lanier =

English musician and recorder player

Clement Lanier (c. 1580–1661) was an English musician and recorder player. He was the son of Nicholas Lanier the Elder and Lucretia Bassano, and hence uncle of Nicholas Lanier, the artist-musician. Clement Lanier was born circa 1580-85 in England, and was buried 6 November 1661 at St. Alphage Church Greenwich, County Kent. His will was proved 3 December 1661 and registered 20 May 1662 (TNA/PCC PROB 11/306), with his daughter, Hannah, as executrix. Although referred to as a "Gentleman," all royal musicians were afforded this title. In this context, the word did not convey the usual meaning of a man possessing a coat of arms or an income from property that eliminated the need to work for one’s livelihood.

== Career ==
Clement had a place on the Court Recorder Consort from 1604–1661. Clement was Musician in Ordinary on recorders 1625, and King's musician of wind instruments 1633-42; he was Musician for the flute 1660-62. When Charles I was executed, the Laniers suffered financial setbacks and hardships with loss of income from the breaking up of the royal court, while they supported the Prince of Wales (later Charles II) and his struggles to regain the throne.

In 1635 he was granted a license to weigh hay.

Clement's nephew, Nicholas Lanier II (son of John and Frances, and grandson of Nicholas The Elder), had assembled a great art collection for their sovereign Charles I. During The Protectorate, the collection was dispersed at auction. It is said that Clement and his brother Jerome Lanier were able to purchase some of the paintings.

== Family ==
Clement Lanier and Hannah Collett married 17 April 1628 in the parish of St. Martin Ludgate, London, with a license out of the faculties (see the Parish register). Hannah was the daughter of John Collet, Draper (d. 1630) and his wife Anne of the parish of All Hallows Lombard Street. No record has been found of their marriage. Anne Collet married second, Walter Carter and was buried 27 September 1647 at St. Alphage, Greenwich. Her will (TNA/PCC PROB 11/201) names daughter Hannah Lanier, son-in-law, Clement Lanier, and grandchildren Hannah Lanier and John Lanier, as well as her other children.

Clement and Hannah Lanier are the progenitors of both the American and Barbadian Lanier lines. All known baptisms and burials of their children took place at St. Alphage Church in Greenwich, County Kent and appear in the register of that parish. (A missing baptism in a parish register does not imply baptism elsewhere but usually a failure of the parish clerk to record the event):

- 1. Hannah Lanier (bapt. 13 February 1629/30); m. Thomas Swetnam 1665; credited by her father with raising siblings after death of their mother
- 2. John Lanier (birth year unknown); missing from parish register; d. circa 1683 in Prince George Co., VA, m. bef 1656 Lucreece in England, two children
- 3. Susanna Lanier (bapt. 16 June 1633); died young
- 4. Nicholas Lanier (bapt. 26 March 1635)
- 5. Susanna Lanier II (birth year unknown); missing from parish register, but under 21 years of age in 1658 so aft 1637
- 6. Lucretia Lanier (bapt. 17 January 1638/9); d. bef 1658
- 7. Charles Lanier (birth year unknown); baptism missing from parish register; buried 26 January 1656/7
- 8. Robert Lanier (bapt. 22 May 1642); d. Barbados or Virginia; m. Rebecca, two known children
- 9. Lionel Lanier (bapt. 17 February 1643/4); died while serving an apprenticeship; buried 19 Sep 1665 at St Benet Paul's Wharf, London
- 10. Frances Lanier (bapt. 3 April 1646)
- 11. William Lanier (bapt. 14 October 1647)
- 12. Elizabeth Lanier (birth year unknown); missing from parish register

NOTE: Of the above children, Robert, Lionel, William, Hannah, Elizabeth, Susanne, and Frances received small bequests in the will of their father's sister, Catherine Lanier Farrant, written 24 August 1659 (TNA/PCC PROB/11/305). This implies that John Lanier had already left home, possibly with emigration to America, while Robert was still in England, if not Greenwich.

== See also ==
- Lanier family tree
