= Christian Kramer =

Christian Kramer (January 16, 1781 – February 18, 1834) was a composer, arranger, musician and Master of the King's Musick between 1829 and 1834. He served under two British kings; George IV and William IV.

Kramer was born in Hannover and was a pupil of Romantic composer Peter Winter. He became a court musician, eventually rising to lead George IV's personal orchestra ("band") which, according to Dwight's Journal of Music was "in its time acknowledged to be one of the best in Europe". Notably, many of the musicians in his band were sourced from Germany. John Dwight goes on to note that he could play all of the instruments in his orchestra to a remarkable degree. A Dictionary of Musical Information of 1876 notes that he was "a composer of great ability", although none of his compositions have remained in the repertoire. He was apparently on good terms with the king; according to one account, like George IV, Kramer suffered from gout and was often inquired of by his master "after a simultaneous attack".

Court offices
Preceded by William Shield	Master of the King's Music; 1829–1834	Succeeded by Franz Cramer
