= Louis Grabu =

Catalan-born French-trained composer and violinist

Louis Grabu, Grabut, Grabue, or Grebus (fl. 1665 – 1690, died after 1693) was a Catalan-born, French-trained composer and violinist who was mainly active in England.

While he was probably born in Catalonia – he was later referred to as 'Lodovicus Grabeu of Shalon in Catalunnia' – details of his early life are lacking. Sometime in his youth he moved to Paris, where he was most likely trained by Lully. At the time of the Restoration he went to England, where French music, especially opera, was much in vogue.

Charles II of England appointed him as a composer for his own private music in 1665, and with the death of Nicholas Lanier in 1666 he became the second person to hold the title Master of the King's Musick. He adapted Robert Cambert's opera Ariadne for a London performance in 1674, and wrote music for John Dryden's Albion and Albanius in 1685.

In 1693 he left England, the only land where he had achieved any fame, and completely disappeared from the historical record.

== Notes ==
Court offices
Preceded by Nicholas Lanier	Master of the King's Music; 1666–1674	Succeeded by Nicholas Staggins
