= Walter Parratt =

English organist and composer (1841–1924)

Sir Walter Parratt KCVO
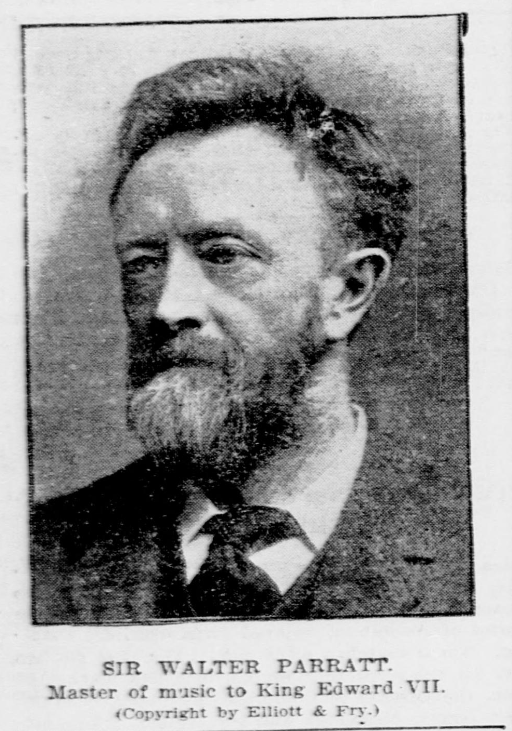

14th Master of the King's Musick Master of the Queen's Musick (1893–1901)
- In office 1 June 1893 – 27 March 1924
- Monarchs: Victoria; Edward VII; George V
- Preceded by: William Cusins
- Succeeded by: Edward Elgar

Personal details
- Born: 10 February 1841 Huddersfield, West Riding of Yorkshire, England
- Died: 27 March 1924 (aged 83) Windsor, Berkshire, England

Sir Walter Parratt (10 February 1841 – 27 March 1924) was an English organist and composer. He served as Master of the Queen's Music, and later as Master of the King's Music, from 1893 to 1924.

== Biography ==
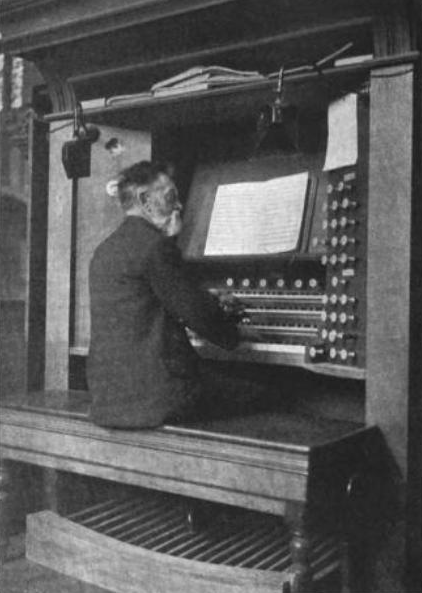
Playing the organ in St. George's Chapel, Windsor

Born in Huddersfield, son of a parish organist, Parratt began to play the pipe organ from an early age, and held posts as an organist while still a child. He was a child prodigy: on one occasion he played Bach's complete The Well-Tempered Clavier by heart, without notice, at age ten.

From 1854 to 1861, he was an organist at St Paul's Church in his native town and, as successor to John Stainer, in 1872 at Magdalen College, Oxford, where he remained for ten years. From 1882, he held the post of organist of St. George's Chapel, Windsor Castle. He became Heather Professor of Music at Oxford University in 1908, taking over from Hubert Parry.

He became one of the foremost organ teachers of his day, with many important posts in Britain being filled by his students. He was president of the Royal College of Organists from 1905 to 1909.

Parratt was also a distinguished chess player, and was able to simultaneously play chess and a complex organ piece—at first sight. He served for a few months as president of the Oxford University Chess Club and for two years was captain of the eight chosen to play against Cambridge.

He died at Windsor Castle on 27 March 1924.

== Honours ==
He was knighted in 1892. In 1893 he was appointed Master of the Queen's Musick to Queen Victoria, and afterward held the same office under Kings Edward VII and George V.

Later honours included: Member (MVO, 1901), Commander (CVO, 1917), and Knight Commander (KCVO, 1921) of the Royal Victorian Order.

After Parratt's death in 1924, a monument to him was erected in the grounds of Huddersfield Parish Church. There is also a monument to him in St George's Chapel, Windsor Castle, next to the entrance to King George VI Memorial Chapel where King George VI and the Queen Mother, and Queen Elizabeth II and Prince Philip, Duke of Edinburgh are buried.

Parratt's portrait is included in William Holman Hunt's 1890 Pre-Raphaelite painting May Morning on Magdalen Tower.

== Appointments ==
- Armitage Bridge Church, 1852–1854
- St. Paul's Church, Huddersfield, 1854–1861
- Private organist to the Earl of Dudley, Witley Court, 1861–1868
- Organist of Wigan Parish Church, 1868–1872
- Magdalen College, Oxford, 1872–1882
- St. George's Chapel, Windsor Castle 1882–1924

== See also ==
- Malcolm Boyle

== Notes ==
Court offices
Preceded by Sir William Cusins	Master of the Queen's (later King's) Musick; 1893–1924	Succeeded by Sir Edward Elgar
