= Thomas C. Lanier =

American planter and Confederate Army officer

Thomas C. Lanier was a wealthy planter and an officer in the Confederate States Army during the American Civil War.

Lanier was born and raised in Pickens County, Alabama. He built a flourishing business, Sipsey Mill. He joined the newly formed Bethesda Presbyterian Church in 1838, along with his wife Sarah D. Lanier.

When the Civil War started, Lanier was elected as captain of the Lane Guards, which became Company B of the 2nd Alabama Infantry. The regiment was organized in Lanier's native Pickens County on February 19, 1861, and his company enrolled in state service on March 18, 1861. Its members were transferred to the Confederate command at Fort Morgan, March 26. Lanier eventually became Colonel of the 42nd Alabama. He was twice wounded and fought in many major campaigns.

Following the war, Colonel Lanier wrote these words:

We ... were whipped out and had to surrender. I am for peace now, henceforth and forever, and hope to never be in or near another war. Let those ... who wave the bloody shirt take their guns and go forth and fight; and I hope they will make a kilkenny fight and no one left to tell the tale.

— as reported by Robert Hugh Kirksey, the former probate judge of Pickens County, Alabama.

Lanier moved to Florida following the war and founded Lanier, Florida. He was Master of the Masonic Lodge of Leesburg, Florida in 1870.
