= Nicholas Staggins =

English composer

Nicholas Staggins (died 13 June 1700) was an English composer.

Staggins first studied music under his father. He was made Master of the King's Music by Charles II in 1674. In 1682, he was granted a musical doctorate by Cambridge University, and from 1684 until his death was Professor of Music at Cambridge. Following his death on the night of 12–13 June 1700, he was succeeded by John Eccles.

From the few fragments of his compositions that survive, his musical ability is generally regarded to have been slender. His most significant work was his music for John Crowne's masque Calisto, or The Chaste Nymph. His other works include odes for the birthdays of William III (in at least 1693, 1694 and 1696). He also wrote incidental music for John Dryden's Conquest of Granada and Marriage à la Mode, George Etheridge's The Man of Mode, Nathaniel Lee's Gloriana, and Thomas Shadwell's Epsom Wells.

In Tom Brown's Letters from the Dead to the Living, Staggins is described as "bandy legged and contemptuously regarded". Following his death he was buried in Woollon on 16 June 1700 at St. George's Chapel, Windsor.

Court offices
Preceded by Louis Grabu	Master of the King's Music; 1674–1700	Succeeded by John Eccles
