= Cudworth Manor =

Grade II listed privately owned moated country house in Newdigate, Mole Valley, Surrey

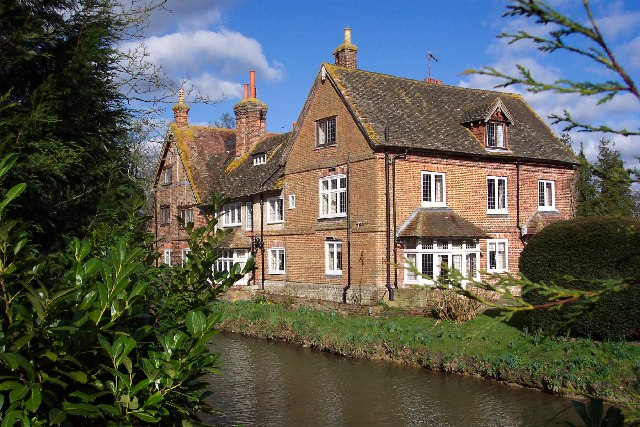
- Cudworth Manor
- Interactive map of the Cudworth Manor area

General information
- Type: Private Residence
- Location: United Kingdom
- Coordinates: 51.1629°N 0.269°W
- Construction started: c.1300

Design and construction
- Designations

Listed Building – Grade II
- Official name: Cudworth Manor
- Designated: 2 May 1990
- Reference no.: 1012789

Cudworth Manor is a Grade II listed privately owned moated manor house in Newdigate, Surrey.

== History ==
In 1298–9, Walter de la Poyle died seised of the site of the manor of Cudworth or Cudford, in Newdigate and Rusper, Sussex, which he held of the Abbot of Chertsey in socage. It is believed that the site dates from c.1300 and that the original house was built by the Newdigate family. Building materials of medieval date which are visible in the footings of the present house suggest that, in its final form, the moated manor took the form of a courtyard house of which extensive remains may survive in what is now the garden of the house. The manor's moat survives intact and in an excellent condition.

Walter de la Poyle's grandson, Henry (d.1360), owned the manor at the time of his death. Some time in the later sixteenth century, Richard Bowett bought the estate, and was later owned by his elder then his younger sons, Thomas Bowett (d.1574) and Nicholas Bowett. John Thorpe bought the estate from Nicholas Bowett in 1579, and it was later sold to the Ede family in 1636 and, in 1775, to Lee Steere (d.1785). It remained the home of the Steere family for some generations. The estate, which includes over 8 acres and the lordship of the manor, was put up for sale for £2.25 million in 2017.

== Architecture ==
The present house dates from the 16th century, with late 17th century, 19th century and 20th century extensions. It is timber framed with 17th century brick infilling, 17th century corbelled stacks, and one 4-light mullioned and transomed casement.

== See also ==
- Newdigate
