= Nicholas Lanier the Elder =

French musician (c. 1532-1612)

Nicholas Lanier the Elder (c. 1532 - 1612) was a French musician who played the flute and the cornett.

== Life ==
Lanier came originally from Rouen, France, and died in England in 1612. He served as a court musician to King Henry II of France in France (listed as the royal flutist on the Chantres et autres Jouers d'instruments for 1559-60). During the Protestant persecutions in France, the Lanier family fled as Huguenots to England. Nicholas arrived in 1561 and settled in the parish of St. Olave's, Hart Street, London. After arrival in England he served in the court of Queen Elizabeth I of England, reported first in 1561 (Spink 2001). The name of Lanier's first wife is unknown (he married her some time before 1565), but following the custom then at court, marriages were arranged or at least approved by the Queen. Lanier was paired with Lucretia Bassano, daughter of the Italian musician Anthony Bassano. The couple prospered, acquiring a great deal of property in East Greenwich, Blackheath, and nearby. Their home was reportedly fitted up with a theatre. Lanier was appointed Musician of the Flutes in 1604. He served Henry II of France and Elizabeth I and James I of England. Three generations of the family served British royalty as court musicians, poets and artists.

As noted, Lanier's first wife's name is unknown; however, they did have two, or possibly three, children of whom one was John Lanier, father of the artist-musician Nicholas Lanier, the most famous of the Laniers. With Lucretia Bassano, he had nine children, including the musicians Alphonso, Innocent, Jerome Lanier, Clement Lanier and Andrea, and Ellen Lanier, who married Alfonso Ferrabosco the younger. After his death, Andrea succeeded him as Musician of the Flutes for life.
