= King's Minstrels =

The Brotherhood of the King's Minstrels was a musicians' guild established in London, a predecessor of the Worshipful Company of Musicians.

In 1449 King Henry VI issued a decree to protect its monopoly of minstrels in England. A charter was granted to the Brotherhood in 1469 which mentioned competition from rude countryfolk and workers at various crafts who have pretended to be musicians. Only trained licensed musicians were to perform and every professional musician was required to belong to the guild.

The last recorded meeting was in 1677.
