= Lanier, Florida =

Coordinates: 30°20′07″N 83°49′08″W

Lanier was platted in 1886 by Colonel Thomas C. Lanier. The 1895 census shows a population of 87 persons along with a post office, express office and a railroad depot. However, the town was abandoned shortly thereafter when dual freezes wiped out the citrus crop in the area.

The official plat of the town can be found in plat book 1, page 22 (lower half of the page) of Sumter County and is titled "The Infant Town of Florida, Map of Orange Bend." In 1887 Lanier became part of Lake County. Col. Lanier purchased the land from Hubbard Hart, who had purchased it from the Internal Improvement Fund of the State of Florida. The plat consists of 35 lots and also contains the following advertisement:

Situated Five miles from Leesburg. Offers Special Inducements of the new extension of the Florida Southern Railway to the Settlers as Follows:

Large bodies of the richest drained prairie Land bordering Lake Griffin. Best possible track farming insuring great crops and freedom from drought. The new town and station are situated on healthful high pine land adjoining the great famous hammocks and wild budded orange groves which have made the place a center of wealth and wealthy men.

Col. Thomas C. Lanier 1886

The Lake County Historical Society has some additional information about this town. It apparently was the 2nd post office ever established in Lake County. There is also a copy of a speech in their records that claims the town was founded by a relative of Sydney Lanier. However, if Col. Thomas C. Lanier is related to Sydney Lanier, the relationship is not close.

In February 2003, most of the platted lots were purchased by Cattle Country, LLC. This company began marketing the land based on the original map of the town. Lake County required aggregating the old lots to comply with the current density rules, so each of the lots marketed by Cattle Country, LLC contain at least two of the original lots of the old plat. Although all of the roads actually built are from the original plat, there were also a number of roads that were no longer needed (because of the aggregation of old lots) which were either vacated or simply not built. This land was also marketed under the name Lanier Glen, but only for marketing purposes.

During the redevelopment of this land, fragments of porcelain and glass were the only evidence found from the previous settlement.

Col. Thomas C. Lanier's personal groves are shown on the original plat. Although they were not given a lot number, they are just east of the numbered lots. It is unknown if he had a house on this land or not. Today his land can be found at the southwest corner of the intersection of Treasure Island Ave and North Treasure Island Rd, Leesburg, Florida. This land and some additional land on the north side of Treasure Island Ave were platted by Cattle Country, LLC in 2004 as Lanier Groves.
