= Charles Cudworth =

British music librarian and musicologist (1908–1977)

- Born: 30 October 1908; Cambridge, England
- Died: 26 December 1977 (aged 69); Cambridge, England
- Occupation: Librarian

Cyril "Charles" Leonard Elwell Cudworth (30 October 1908 – 26 December 1977) was a British musicologist, librarian, and librettist.

== Life ==
Born in Cambridge as the second son of David Cudworth, Cudworth was known as “Charles”. Encouraged in his musical studies by Edward J. Dent, he became Assistant Librarian of the Music Section at Cambridge University Library from 1943 to 1946. Three years later, he was appointed Librarian of the Pendlebury Library of Music later becoming Curator in 1957 and holding this post until he retired. In 1958, he was awarded an Honorary MA degree by the University Cambridge. He was also a founder Member of the International Association of Music Libraries.

Cudworth's musicological interests focussed on eighteenth century English music and he was an authority on the English symphony, keyboard concerto and Handel. He established that ‘Purcell's Trumpet Voluntary’ was by Jeremiah Clarke. He was also a contributor to the Encyclopædia Britannica and the New Grove Dictionary of Music and Musicians. In addition, he was also interested in local history, architecture, poetry and was librettist for several works by his friend Patrick Hadley.

== Select bibliography ==
- Cudworth, C. (1935), "The Dutch influence in East Anglia", Proceedings of the Cambridge Antiquarian Society, 37
- Cudworth, C. (1939), "Dutch gables in East Anglia", Architectural Review, 85
- Cudworth, C. (1951), "The English symphonists of the eighteenth century", Proceedings of the Royal Musical Association, 78: 31–51, doi:10.1093/jrma/78.1.31
- Cudworth, C. (1953), "Baroque, rococo, galant, classic", Monthly Musical Record, 83: 172–5
- Cudworth, C. (1953), "The English Organ Concerto", The Score, 8: 51–60
- Cudworth, C. (1953), "Some New Facts about the Trumpet Voluntary", Musical Times, 94 (1327): 401–3, doi:10.2307/933069, JSTOR 933069
- Cudworth, C. (1956), "'Baptist's Vein': French Orchestral Music and its Influence from 1650 to 1750", Proceedings of the Royal Musical Association, 83: 29–47, doi:10.1093/jrma/83.1.29
- Cudworth, C. (1972), Handel, London
