= Cudworth, Somerset =

Village and civil parish in Somerset, England

Coordinates: 50.8905°N 2.8899°W

Cudworth
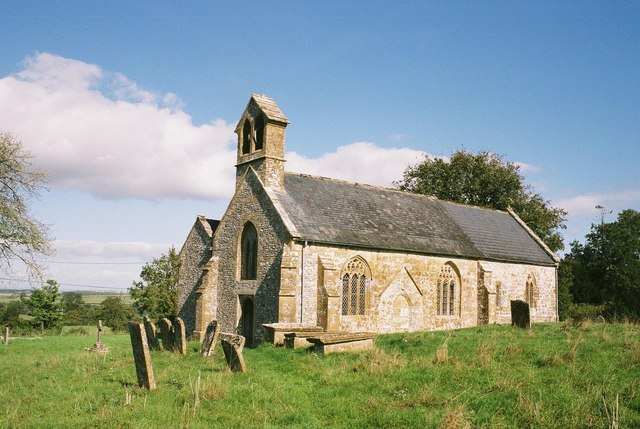
- Church of St Michael, Cudworth

- Location within Somerset
- Population: 69 (2011)
- OS grid reference: ST375105
- Civil parish: Chard
- Unitary authority: Somerset Council
- Ceremonial county: Somerset
- Region: South West
- Country: England
- Sovereign state: United Kingdom
- Post town: Ilminster
- Postcode district: TA19
- Dialling code: 01460
- Police: Avon and Somerset
- Fire: Devon and Somerset
- Ambulance: South Western
- UK Parliament: Yeovil

Cudworth (English: /ˈkʊdwɜːrθ/) is a village and parish in Somerset, England, situated 5 miles (8.0 km) north east of Chard. The village has a population of 69.

== History ==
The parish of Cudworth was part of the South Petherton Hundred.

The manor was held, around 1187, by Alan de Furneaux who gave the church and 30 acres (12.1 ha) of land to Wells Cathedral to found the Cudworth prebend. The Speke family had the lordship from 1431 to 1791 when it was bought by the Pouletts of Hinton St George.

300 m east of Knight House Farm are earthworks showing the site of houses, tracks and farming from a medieval settlement.

== Governance ==
The parish council has responsibility for local issues, including setting an annual precept (local rate) to cover the council's operating costs and producing annual accounts for public scrutiny. The parish council evaluates local planning applications and works with the local police, district council officers, and neighbourhood watch groups on matters of crime, security, and traffic. The parish council's role also includes initiating projects for the maintenance and repair of parish facilities, as well as consulting with the district council on the maintenance, repair, and improvement of highways, drainage, footpaths, public transport, and street cleaning. Conservation matters (including trees and listed buildings) and environmental issues are also the responsibility of the council.

For local government purposes, since 1 April 2023, the parish comes under the unitary authority of Somerset Council. Prior to this, it was part of the non-metropolitan district of South Somerset (established under the Local Government Act 1972). It was part of Chard Rural District before 1974.

It is also part of the Yeovil county constituency represented in the House of Commons of the Parliament of the United Kingdom. It elects one Member of Parliament (MP) by the first past the post system of election.

== Religious sites ==
The Anglican parish Church of St Michael has 12th-century origins, with the north doorway and one small window of that period remaining. The nave and chancel are from the 13th century. The Old Prebendal House was built as a vicarage in the 17th century.
