= Newdigate =

Village and parish in Surrey, England

Coordinates: 51.1786°N 0.2782°W

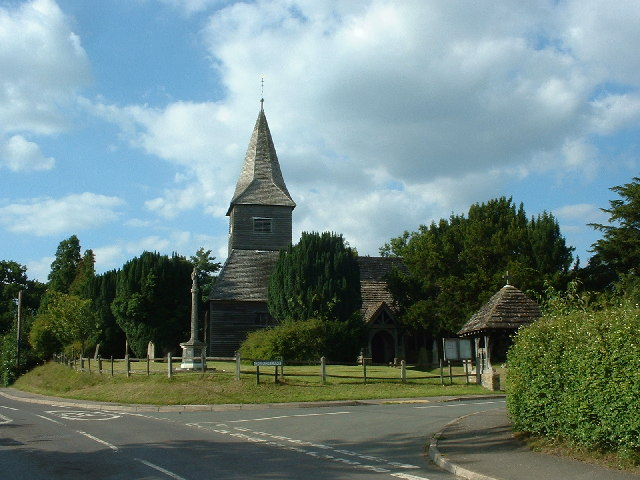
- St Peter's Parish Church, Newdigate

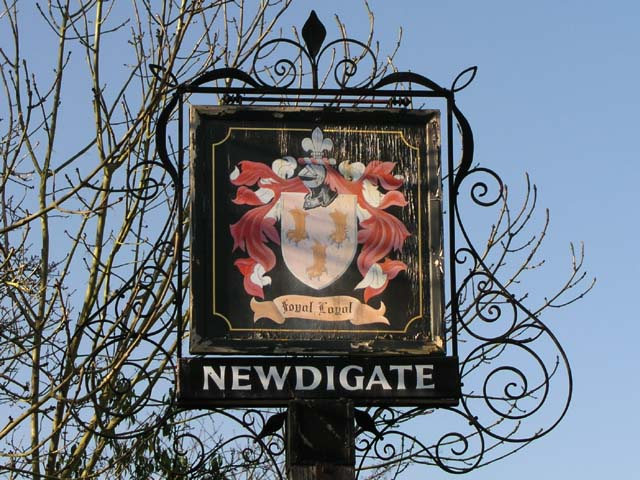
- Village Sign

- Location within Surrey
- Area: 19.18 km^{2} (7.41 sq mi)
- Population: 1,749 (Civil Parish 2011)
  - Density: 91/km^{2} (240/sq mi)
- OS grid reference: TQ2043
- Civil parish: Newdigate
- District: Mole Valley
- Shire county: Surrey
- Region: South East
- Country: England
- Sovereign state: United Kingdom
- Post town: Dorking
- Postcode district: RH5
- Dialling code: 01306
- Police: Surrey
- Fire: Surrey
- Ambulance: South East Coast
- UK Parliament: Dorking and Horley

Newdigate is a village and civil parish in the Mole Valley borough of Surrey. Lying in a relatively flat part of the Weald, Newdigate is to the east of the A24 road between Dorking and Horsham, 13 miles (21 km) ESE of Guildford and 25 miles (40 km) south of London. Neighbouring parishes are Charlwood, North Holmwood, South Holmwood, Leigh and Capel.

== History ==
=== Etymology ===
The name of Newdigate refers to a place at the gate or path to a wood. Surviving manuscripts such as manorial rolls, Assize Rolls and Feet of Fines give forms including Newdegate (13th century), Newedegate and Neudegate (15th century) and Nudgate (16th century). The name Ewood (Iwode in Feet of Fines 1312) occurs in the parish and might derive from Old English for a forest of yew-trees, in which case the 'N' survives from a prefix such as 'in' (O.E. 'on') or 'at the' (O.E. 'be þane'). Alternatively, the word may refer to a 'New wood'.

=== Early history ===
In early history, Newdigate was at the western heart of the Weald a much more dense wooded forest occupying the space between the North and South Downs.

=== Middle Ages ===
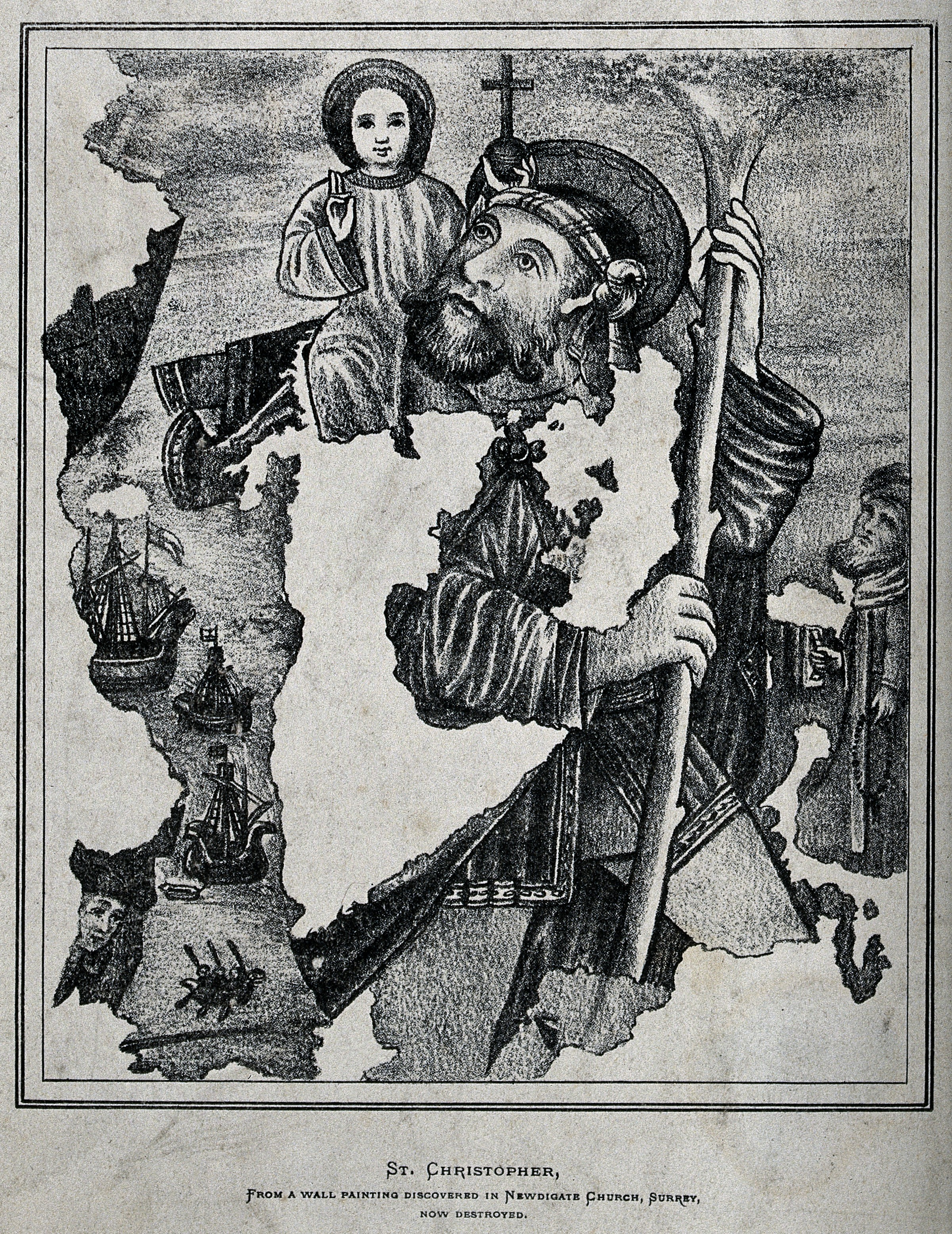
St. Christopher, from a wall painting discovered in Newdigate Church, now destroyed

Newdigate was for the most part in Copthorne Hundred, forming a detached part of it. But the hamlet of Parkgate and the part of the parish near it were in Reigate Hundred. The place does not appear at all in the 1086 Domesday Book, and the connection with Copthorne is a probable result of the land holding by the Montfort family of Newdigate together with Ashtead Manor, while Parkgate was held with Reigate and Dorking by the Earls of Warenne and Surrey.

Newdigate has a medieval church, St. Peter's Church, which is a grade II* listed building.

Ewood (Yew Wood) was described during the medieval period as a "park" which was an enclosure of the forest for the purpose of deer hunting – the patent rolls of 1312 refer to it.

As Newdigate began as a road through the forest (Reigate to Ockley) rather than a fixed settlement. An inclosure of considerable land later gave rise to the name Parkgate, the "gate" by now meaning an entrance.

==== Newdigate or Marshlands Manor ====
In 1564 Trinity College, Cambridge's estate at Newdigate was divided amongst various tenants who paid quit-rents, heriots, and owed suit of court. In 1702, its manor house and farms of Naylors, Horseland, and Bearland, in good repair, were let to Dr. Akehurst, remained in the possession of Trinity College until the middle of the 19th century.

==== Newdigate Place ====
Newdigate Place also often early on named Newdigate Manor was the seat of Richard de Newdigate's family from 1234 to 1235, a large house standing round a courtyard. Henry Nevill, then Lord Abergavenny at the close of the 16th century (Tudor Period) was overlord only of the manor, it having descended to him. Newdigate Place was almost totally demolished near the end of the 18th century. From 1636 to 1810 the manor was owned by the Budgen family. A former version standing close to it was pulled down by John Budgen owner between 1772 and 1805. In 1810 the buyer was the Duke of Norfolk.

==== Cudworth Manor ====
In 1298–1299, Walter de la Poyle died while holding the manor site of Cudworth (or Cudford) in Newdigate and Rusper, Sussex. He held this land from the Abbot of Chertsey under a system of tenure known as socage.

The presence of medieval building materials in the footings of the current house suggests that, in its final form, the moated manor was a courtyard house. Extensive remains of this original structure may still exist beneath what is now the garden.

==== Manor and Park of Ewood/Iwood ====
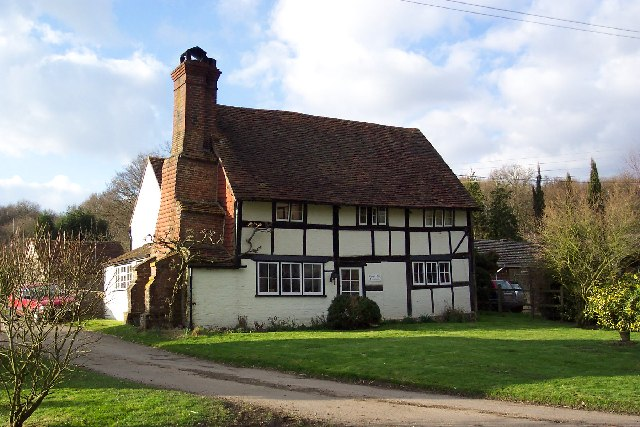
The former Ewood Manor, now Ewood Farmhouse

In 1574 a survey was taken of the dwelling houses and buildings, including the ironworks, furnace, forge, and hammer, which were then worked by Robert Reynolds, who was occupying the mansion house and park, and who also held the brew house and watermill for grinding corn. The ironworks were then said to be worth £40 yearly. After many more owners – Sir Francis Carew was among them – Joseph Valentine Grimstead sold it to the Duke of Norfolk in 1786.

In 1807 the Duke of Norfolk began to build a new house at Ewood, but it was never completed, and the part built was pulled down after the duke's death in 1815. By 1911 Henry Lee Steere of Jayes Park, Ockley, was Lord of the Manor.

==== Kingsland Manor ====
Fewer nobility have held this manor, namely in 1619 Kingsland Manor was briefly purchased by Sir Thomas Bludder and by 1716 ended up in the use of Ezra Gill, Lords of the manor of Temple Elfold, Capel.

==== Early industry in Newdigate ====
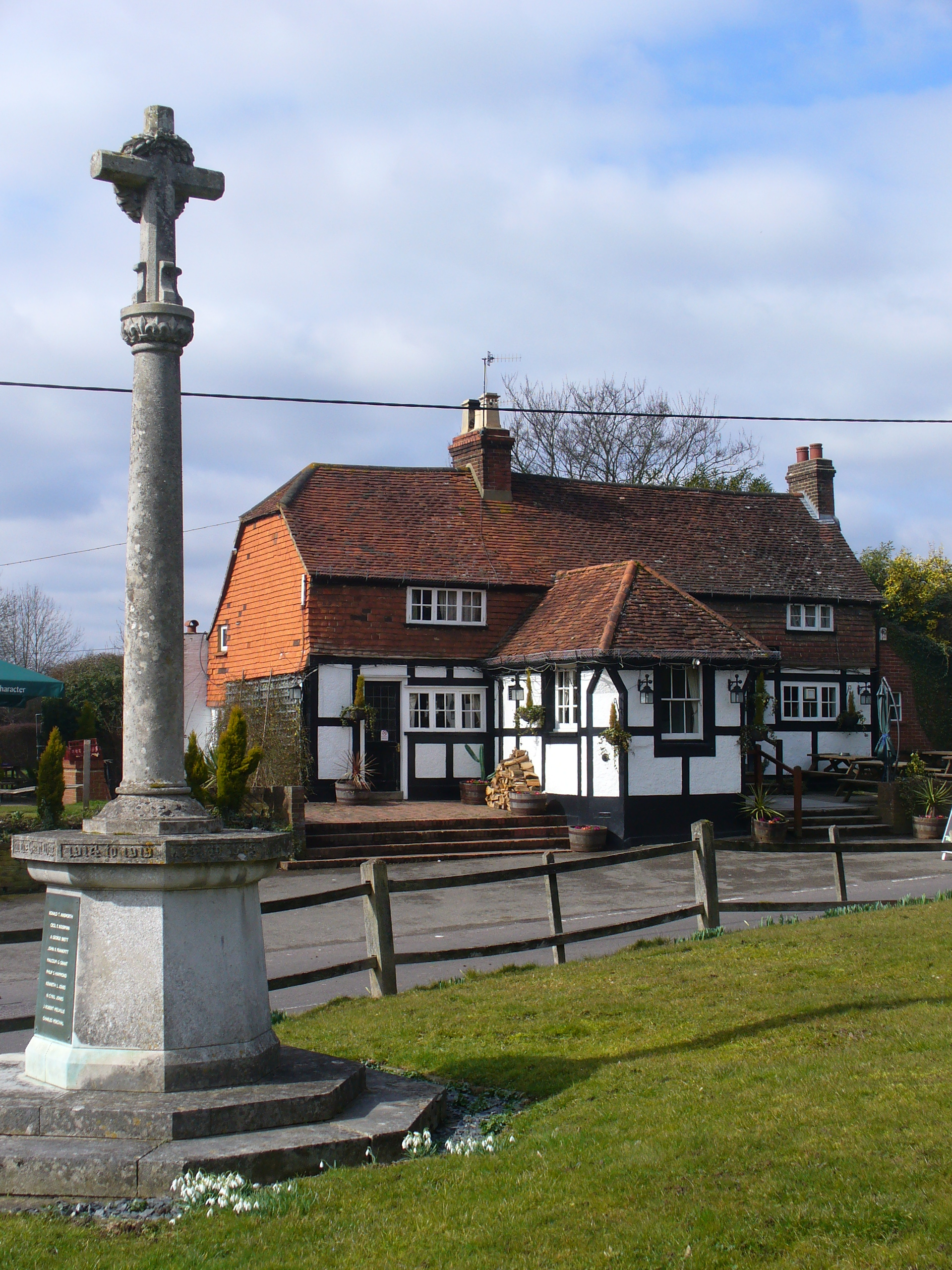
Newdigate War Memorial

Owing to its iron foundry, for which a former lake, Ewood Pond was built, Newdigate was among the parishes excepted by name from the Act 1 Elizabeth against cutting of timber, and the works at Ewood were excepted by name from a later Act on the same matter owing to the good management of the woods.

=== Post industrial Revolution ===
Based on the 1841 census, Samuel Lewis (publisher) wrote in his topographical guide to England that the population was 552. St Peter's living as today is a rectory and in the patronage of the Crown. All tithes have been commuted for £580, and the glebe comprised in 1848 4 acres (1.6 ha). A description given in 1911 for the Victoria County Histories topological summary is in terms of land use: "The parish is still thickly wooded, and is purely agricultural, except for brick and tile works."

Charities funded an exhibition (scholarship) for four years study for one of the school's pupils to Trinity College, Cambridge.

From the 1930s to the early 1980s Newdigate was home to the Schermuly Rocket Pistol Apparatus Limited, manufacturer of devices for firing rescue lines to stricken ships.

== Geography ==
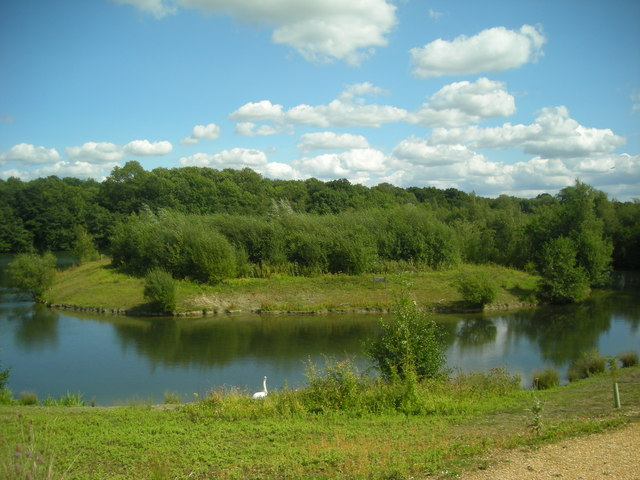
Nature Reserve of former brickworks covering 43 acres (17 ha)

Newdigate is 1.6 miles (2.6 km) east of the A24 road between Dorking and Horsham, 13 miles (21 km) ESE of Guildford and 25 miles (40 km) south of London.

Endemic to the soil in Newdigate are a number of thick clay beds making the area was home to numerous brickmaking businesses. However, the local brickworks is now a housing estate called Mulberry Place, or more commonly, "The Mulberries".

During 2018 & 2019, Newdigate has been the centre of many earthquakes, the strongest striking in 2019 and having a magnitude of 3.1

== Localities ==
=== Cudworth ===
Cudworth (English: /ˈkʊdwɜːrθ/) is a hamlet is 1 mile (1.6 km) southeast of the village centre of Newdigate. In its centre is a scheduled ancient monument, grade II* listed, tight-moated manor house, Cudworth Manor, see history above.

=== Parkgate ===
Parkgate contains several residential roads, split by Ewood and Parkgate copses, two small copses part of a small forest from Reffolds Copse to Furzefield and Hammonds Copses.

== Economy, Culture and Community ==
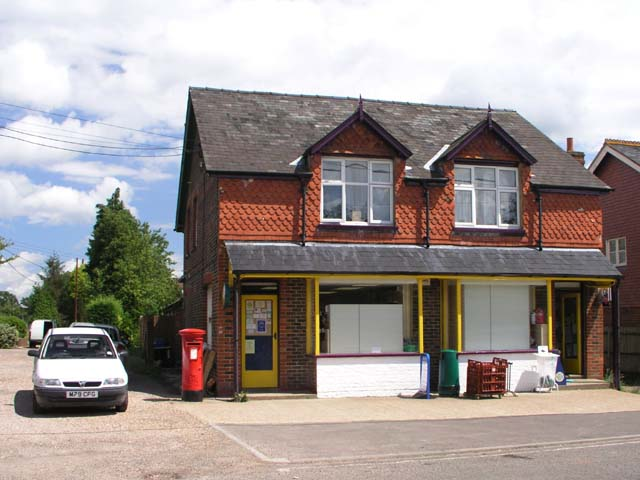
Newdigate main shop/post office

Newdigate has a village shop with a sub post office and two public houses as well as many small businesses. The village hall is a substantial building hired out for activities and events.

Due to a controlled number of properties in good condition, village amenities and Endowed Infant School, the house prices in Newdigate are considerably higher than in nearby North and South Holmwood. The area is very much part of the London Commuter Belt and the nearest railway station is Holmwood station, located at Beare Green 1.7 miles (2.7 km) away from the village centre, on the Mole Valley Line.

== Demography and housing ==
Newdigate civil parish had in 2001 a population of 1,524 in 625 households, of which 17.7% were aged over 65; 3.9% of the population were in full-time further education; 76.8% of all men were economically active whereas 2.4% were unemployed, 5% worked part-time; 60.4% of all women were economically active whereas 0.9% were unemployed, 33.8% worked part-time.

As to ethnicity, 98.8% of the population identified themselves as being white, 0.2% as black 0.2%, as of Indian descent, 0.2%, as of Pakistani descent and 0.0% as of mixed or other ethnicity.

In terms of religion, 78.3%% of the population responded as being Christian, 0.4% as Muslim, 1.2% other religions, 13.8% as atheist and 6.6% declined to answer.

Newdigate's economy is predominantly a service sector economy reflected by a low concentration at one end of the official categorisation table of occupation given, compiled from the 2001 census:

Category	Number of adults in category in 2001	Percentage of those aged 16–74
Lower supervisory and technical occupations	43	3.8%
Semi-routine occupations	70	6.2%
Routine occupations	48	4.3%

Whereas 32.0% of the population worked in middle or higher professional occupations, based upon salary and title.

2011 Census Homes
Output area	Detached	Semi-detached	Terraced	Flats and apartments	Caravans/temporary/mobile homes	shared between households
Civil parish	381	202	26	67	48	0

The average level of accommodation in the region composed of detached houses was 28%, the average that was apartments was 22.6%.

2011 Census Key Statistics
Output area	Population	Households	% Owned outright	% Owned with a loan	hectares
Civil parish	1,749	724	41.3%	39.5%	1918

The proportion of households in the civil parish who owned their home outright compares to the regional average of 35.1%. The proportion who owned their home with a loan compares to the regional average of 32.5%. The remaining % is made up of rented dwellings (plus a negligible % of households living rent-free).

== Education ==
- Newdigate Infant School is in the village.
