= Piano Concerto No. 2 (Mendelssohn) =

Piano Concerto in D minor
- No. 2
- by Felix Mendelssohn
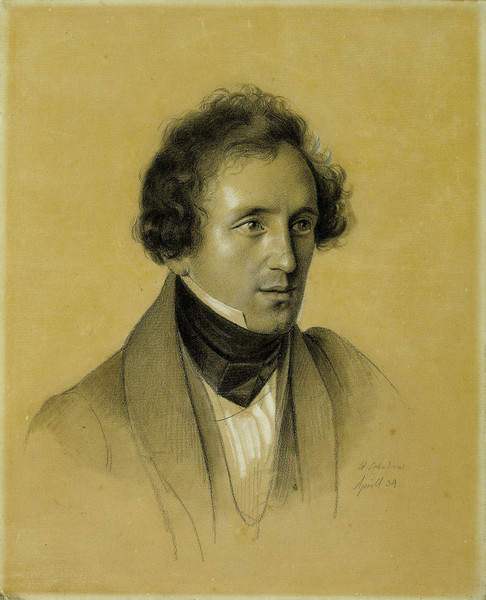
- The composer by Friedrich Wilhelm Schadow, 1834
- Key: D minor
- Opus: 40
- Year: 1837
- Period: Romantic
- Composed: 1837
- Duration: about 25 minutes
- Movements: 3

Premiere
- Date: 21 September 1837
- Location: Birmingham Festival

The Piano Concerto No. 2 in D minor, Op. 40, was written in 1837 by Felix Mendelssohn and premiered at the Birmingham Festival on 21 September that year, an event that also saw the premiere of Mendelssohn's oratorio St. Paul. He had already written a piano concerto in A minor with string accompaniment (1822), two concertos with two pianos (1823–4), and his first Piano Concerto.

The concerto is about 25 minutes in length and is scored for solo piano, 2 flutes, 2 oboes, 2 clarinets, 2 bassoons, 2 horns, 2 trumpets, timpani, and strings.

== History ==
Unusually for Mendelssohn, who often produced his compositions quickly, the Second Piano Concerto took him a great deal of effort. Its genesis dates to the period shortly after his marriage and is first mentioned in a letter to his friend Karl Klingemann while on honeymoon: "aber ein Konzert machte ich mir so gern für England, und kann immer noch nicht dazu kommen. Ich möchte wissen, warum mir das so schwer wird." [but I would like to write a concerto for England, and I can't manage it. I want to know why this is so difficult for me."] Mendelssohn's difficulties probably stemmed from a desire to excel in the new work, written expressly for the Birmingham Music Festival, and thereby impress English audiences. The arduousness of the task is attested to by the fact that more autograph sources for the concerto exist than for any other composition he wrote for piano and orchestra.

Work on the piece lasted from April through to early September 1837, although his progress was significant enough that he felt confident enough to mention the work to his publisher, Breitkopf & Härtel in early August, having shortly before completed an autograph copy of both the piano part and orchestral score. However, it was not until six weeks after the Birmingham premiere and a second performance at the Gewandhaus in Leipzig, in early November, that Mendelssohn began actively to negotiate publication. He continued to work on the score through that month, delivering a final score to his publishers on December 12. The publisher sent Mendelssohn the proofs of the score on 11 May 1838, which the composer promised to return a copied version of shortly thereafter. The work was published later that summer, although Mendelssohn was unhappy with the result, complaining, among other matters, that the title page was in French rather than German.

== Critical reception ==
Despite the effort it took Mendelssohn to write the concerto, it has been seen as a somewhat slight contribution to the repertoire. The composer Robert Schumann, writing in the Neue Zeitschrift für Musik, offered a frank assessment of the piece, observing:

This concerto, to be sure, will offer virtuosos little in which to show off their monstrous dexterity. Mendelssohn gives them almost nothing to do that they have not already done a hundred times before. We have often heard them complain about it. And not unjustly! ...

One will ask how it compares with his First Concerto. It's the same, and yet not the same; the same because it comes from the same practised master hand, different because it comes ten years later. Sebastian Bach is discernible in the harmonization. The rest, melody, form and instrumentation are all Mendelssohn.

Let us enjoy the fleeting, cheerful gift! It resembles one of those works thrown off by the older masters while recuperating from one of their great exertions. Our younger master will certainly not forget how the older ones would suddenly emerge with something magnificent – Mozart's Concerto in D minor, Beethoven's in G!

Despite being overshadowed by other Romantic piano concertos (including Schumann's own 1845 Concerto) and the relative simplicity of the piano part, it is nonetheless frequently performed and recorded.

== Movements ==
There are three movements (played attacca):

1. Allegro appassionato
2. Adagio. Molto sostenuto (in B♭ major)
3. Finale. Presto scherzando (in D major)
