= Benjamin Cudworth Yancey Jr. =

American politician, lawyer, army officer and diplomat (1817–1891)

Colonel Benjamin Cudworth Yancey Jr
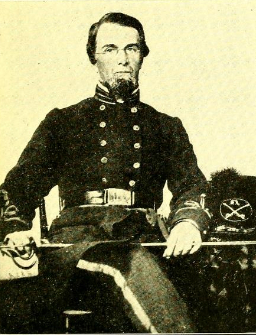

Member of the Georgia House of Representatives from the Clarke County district
- In office 1875–1879

3rd United States Minister to Argentina
- In office December 1, 1858 – September 30, 1859
- Preceded by: James A. Peden
- Succeeded by: John F. Cushman

President of the Alabama State Senate

Member of the Alabama House of Representatives
- In office 1855–1856

Member of the South Carolina House of Representatives from the Edgefield District district
- In office 1846–1849

Personal details
- Born: April 27, 1817 Charleston, South Carolina, US
- Died: October 24, 1891 (aged 74)
- Education: Franklin College (A.B.); Harvard Law School (B.L.)
- Occupation: Diplomat, Politician, Soldier
- Military career
- Allegiance: Confederate States of America
- Branch: Confederate States Army
- Rank: Colonel
- Unit: Georgia State Troops
- Conflicts: American Civil War

Benjamin Cudworth Yancey Jr. (April 27, 1817 – October 24, 1891) was an American politician, lawyer, diplomat, and officer in the Confederate States Army during the American Civil War.

== Background ==
Yancey, the brother of leading Fire-Eater William Lowndes Yancey, was born in Charleston, South Carolina, in 1817. He attended Franklin College (now known as the Franklin College of Arts and Sciences), the founding school of the University of Georgia in Athens, where he was a member of the Phi Kappa Literary Society and earned a Bachelor of Arts (A.B.) degree in 1836. He later graduated from Harvard Law School with a Bachelor of Law (B.L.).

== Political and diplomatic career ==
From 1846 to 1849, he was elected to the South Carolina General Assembly House of Representatives for the Edgefield District and served one term. He also practiced law in Hamburg, South Carolina at that time. He moved to Cherokee County, Alabama, and was elected to the Alabama Senate in 1855, serving as the president of that body from 1855 to 1856. He was Minister Resident to Argentina in 1858. During the Civil War, he was a major in Cobb's Legion. He participated in the Virginia campaign, but was subsequently transferred, as colonel, to Georgia in command of state troops.

For twenty years he owned a slave who eventually went by the name of Robert Webster, the son of Daniel Webster. He allowed Robert Webster to work in Atlanta during the Civil War, where Webster did quite well financially. After the war, Yancey lost his property and borrowed money from his former slave.

In 1867, Yancey was elected president of the Alabama State Agricultural society, and he served as a trustee of the University of Georgia from 1860 to 1889. In 1875, Yancey was elected to the Georgia House of Representatives as a representative of Clarke County until 1879. He died in 1891.

== Family ==
Yancey was married twice, first to Laura Hines and second to Sarah Paris Hamilton.

Political offices
Preceded by	President of the Georgia House of Representatives from the Clarke County; 1875–1879	Succeeded by
Preceded by	President of the Alabama State Senate; 1855–1856	Succeeded by
Preceded by	Member of the South Carolina House of Representatives from the Edgefield District; 1846–1849	Succeeded by
Diplomatic posts
Preceded by James A. Peden	United States Minister Resident, Argentina; December 1, 1858–September 30, 1859	Succeeded by John F. Cushman
