= Nicholas Lanier =

English musician, scenographer and painter (1588-1666)

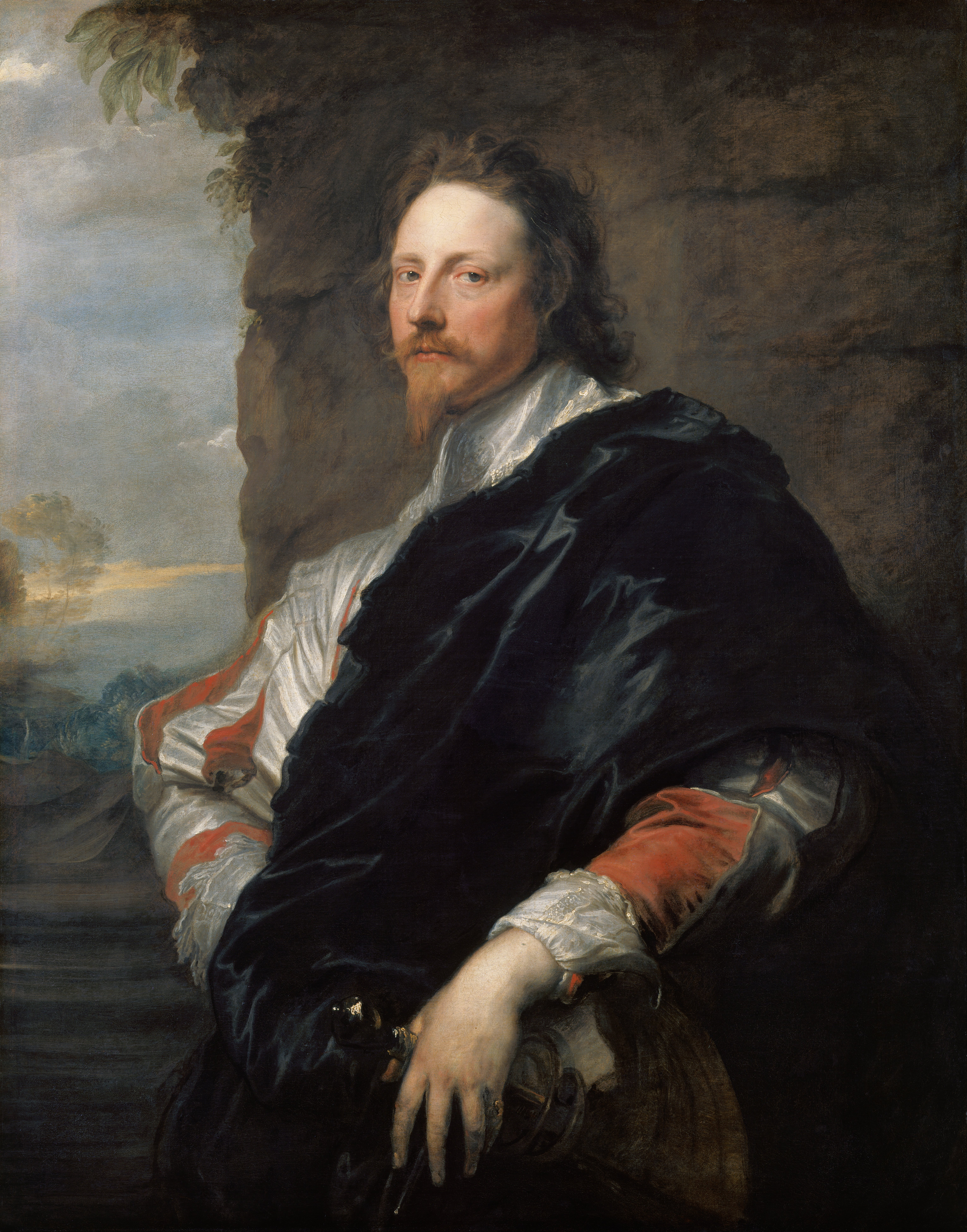
Nicholas Lanier, painting by van Dyck, 1632, Kunsthistorisches Museum

Nicholas Lanier, sometimes Laniere (baptised 10 September 1588 – buried 24 February 1666) was an English composer and musician; the first to hold the title of Master of the King's Music from 1625 to 1666, an honour given to musicians of great distinction. He was the court musician, a composer and performer and Groom of the Chamber in the service of King Charles I and Charles II. He was also a singer, lutenist, scenographer and painter.

== Biography ==
Nicholas Lanier was a descendant of a French family of royal musicians, the Lanière family, who were Huguenots, and was baptised at Greenwich. His father and grandfather left France to escape persecutions. His aunt, Emilia Bassano, was the daughter of Venetian musicians at the Tudor court and, before her marriage to Alfonso Lanier, had been the mistress to the Lord Chamberlain, a cousin of Queen Elizabeth I, and possibly Henry Wriothesly, Earl of Southampton. Historian A. L. Rowse suggested that she may well have been the famous Dark Lady of Shakespeare's sonnets. The family settled in England in 1561. Nicholas Lanier was the son of Frances Galliardello and John Lanier, who was the son of Nicholas Lanier the Elder, court musician to the French King Henry II. His maternal grandfather was another royal musician, Mark Anthony Galliardello. Nicholas was first taught by his father, John, who played the sackbut. In 1613 he composed a masque for the marriage of the Earl of Somerset jointly with Giovanni Coperario and others.

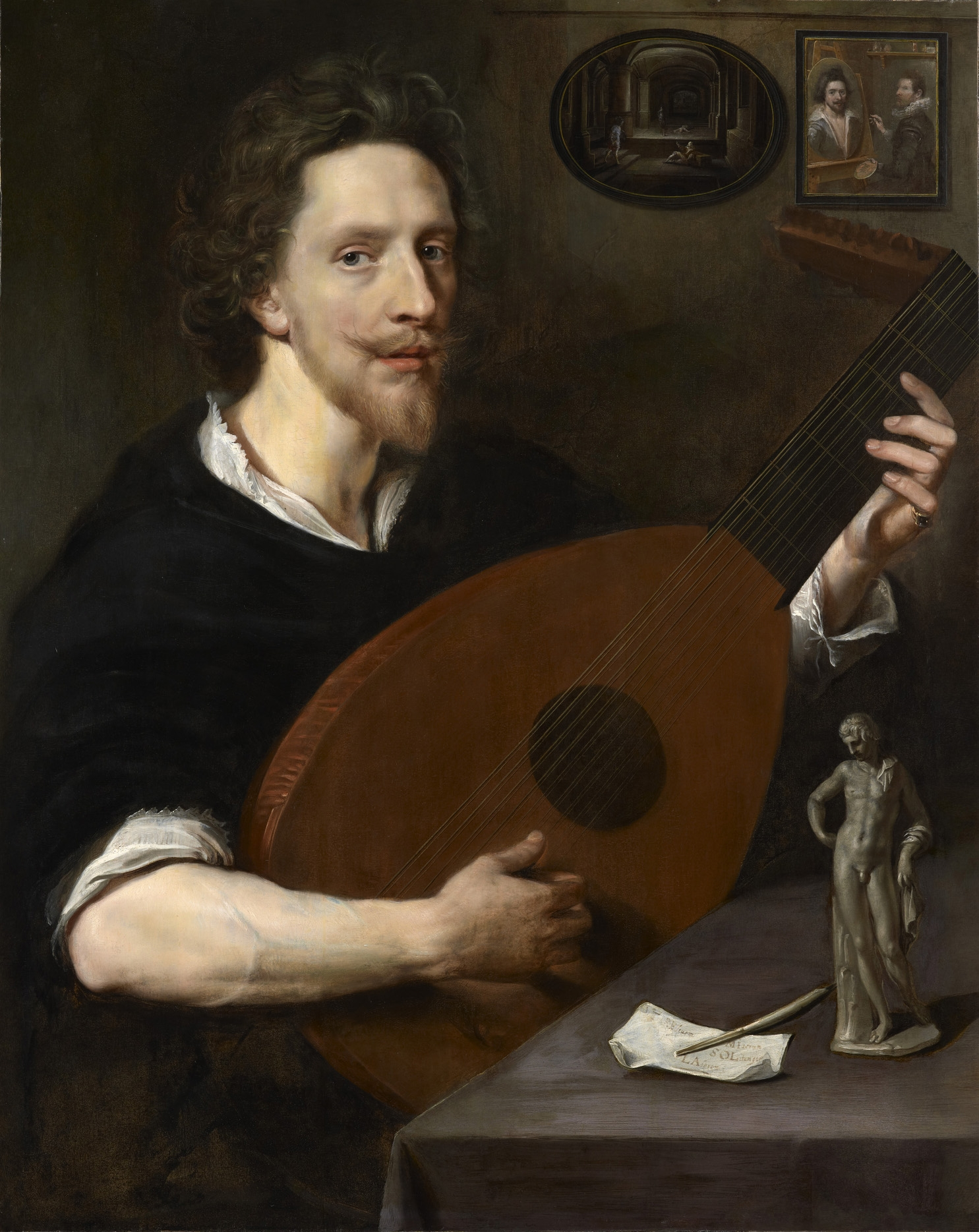
Nicholas Lanier 1613, unknown painter, sold at Christies.

He also wrote music, sang and made sets for Thomas Campion and Ben Jonson's The Masque of Augurs and Lovers Made Men.

In the 1610s, Lanier was appointed as a lutenist to the King's orchestra and a singer in the King's Consorte from 1625 to 1642. He also sang and played the viola da gamba. Lanier was also appointed as Groom of the Chamber for the Queen's Privy Chamber in 1639.

From 1625 he made a series of visits to Italy to collect paintings for King Charles I, including most of the art collection of the Dukes of Mantua. During his travels he heard the new Italian music being written by the likes of Claudio Monteverdi. This led to him being one of the first English composers to introduce monody and recitative to England. It was Lanier who, when his own portrait was painted by the Flemish painter van Dyck in Antwerp, convinced the King to bring van Dyck to England, where van Dyck became the leading court painter. The portrait displays the attitude of studied carelessness, called sprezzatura, recommended in The Book of the Courtier by Baldassare Castiglione, defined as "a certain nonchalance, so as to conceal all art and make whatever one does or says appear to be without effort and almost without any thought about it". Lanier's portrait by van Dyck hangs today in Vienna at the Kunsthistoriches Museum.

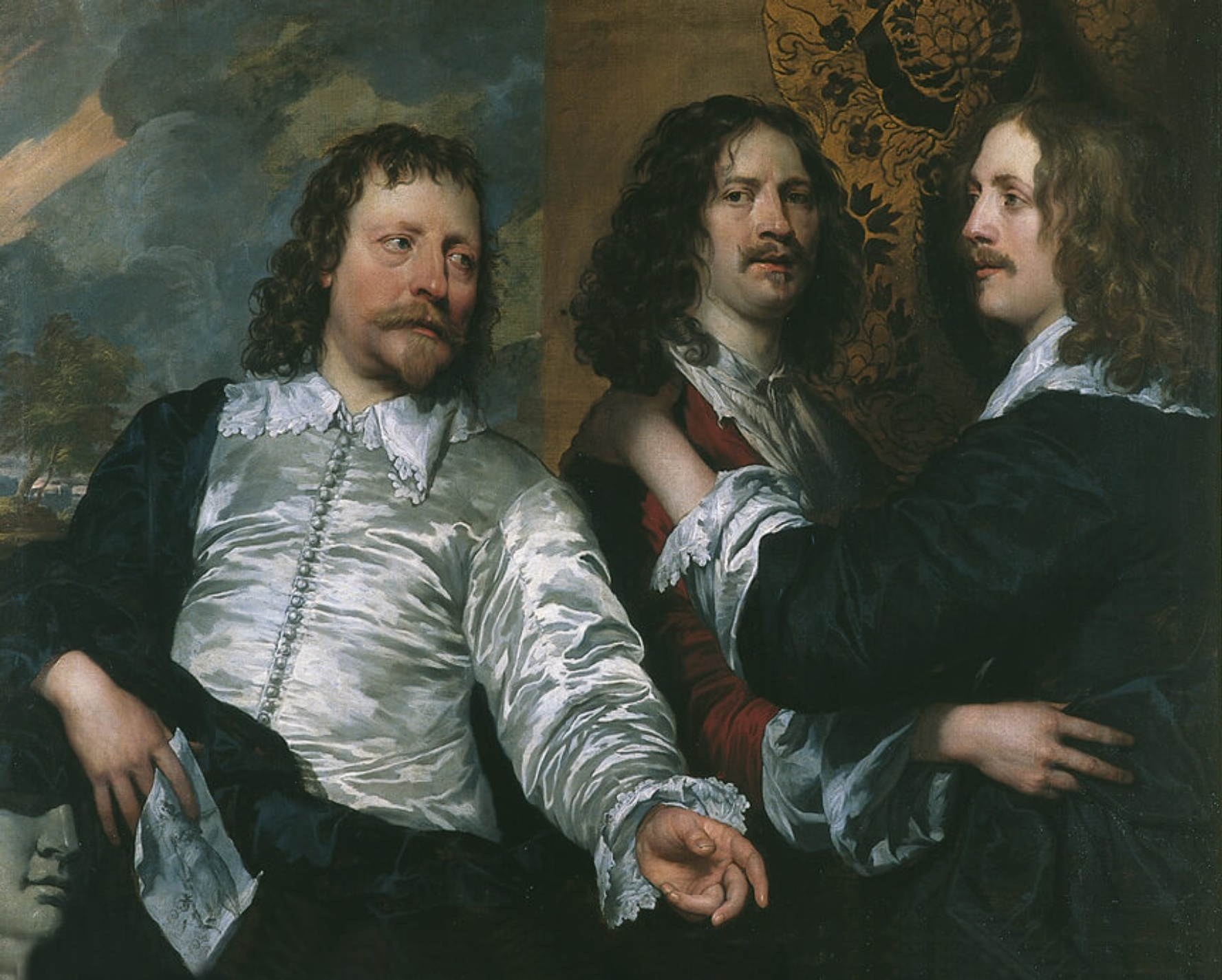
Portrait of the artist, William Dobson, with Nicholas Lanier (left) and Sir Charles Cotterell (right), c 1645.

In 1626, Lanier became the first composer to hold the title Master of the King's Music; an honour given a musician of great distinction. The office of Master of the King's Musick is the equivalent to the title of the Poet Laureate. During the Commonwealth of England he lived in the Netherlands, but returned after the Restoration to resume his duties in 1660. When he returned to England, he became music master to Charles II. He made several sceneries, like for example for Ben Jonson's Lovers Made Men. There is only one painting which can be identified as being made by Lanier, a self-portrait in the music faculty of Oxford University. Lanier died in 1666 in Greenwich.

== See also ==
External videos
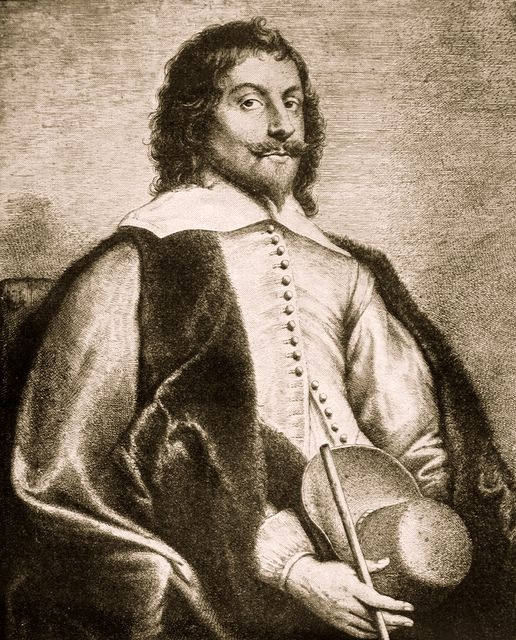
- No more shall meads be decked with flowers – Nicholas Lanier
- Hero's Complaint to Leander – Nicholas Lanier

== Bibliography ==
- Callon, Gordon J., Nicholas Lanier: The complete works, (1994), Severinus Press, ISBN 0-86314-224-9.

Court offices
| New title | Master of the King's Music; 1625–1666 (role abolished 1649–1660) | Succeeded by Louis Grabu |
