= List of musical families (classical music) =

Throughout the history of Western classical music, many noted families have had multiple musical members. Ranging from the Renaissance period to present day, the best known examples include the Bach family and Couperin family. On this proliferation, musicologist Malcolm Boyd observes that "by its nature, musical activity inpinges on everyone within earshot (and, some would say, even on the child in the womb) and therefore invites at least some degree of communal engagement. Literature, painting and mathematics are, on the other hand, solitary pursuits [...] the musical family is a phenomenon rarely paralleled in the other arts".

Non-musical family members are mostly not included unless for clarification purposes. Names that already have an established family entry are redirected to the main article - unless (as with Mendelssohn) they include mainly non-musical members, in which case the musicians are extracted here.

- Alain family of French musicians, particularly organists
- Albert Alain (1880–1971), organist, composer and organ builder
  - Jehan Alain (1911–1940), organist, composer and soldier
  - Marie-Odile Alain (1914–1937), organist
  - Olivier Alain (1918–1994), organist, pianist, musicologist and composer
  - Marie-Claire Alain (1926–2013), organist and scholar
- Anzalone family of Italian musicians, active during the 16th and 17th centuries in Naples
- Andriessen family of Dutch composers
- Willem Andriessen (1887–1964), composer and pianist
- Hendrik Andriessen (1892–1981), composer and organist, married pianist Johanna Justina Andriessen (1898–1975)
  - Heleen Andriessen (1921–2000), flautist
  - Jurriaan Hendrik Andriessen (1925–1996), composer
  - Caecilia Andriessen (1931–2019), pianist, teacher, composer
  - Louis Andriessen (1939–2021), composer and pianist

- Bach family of notable composers of the baroque and classical periods
- Bassano family of Italian musicians, many of whom moved to England (see also Lanier family, below)
- Jeronimo Bassano, piffero player to the Doge of Venice between 1506 and 1512
  - Alvise (died London, 15–31 Aug 1554), worked for the Scuola di San Marco, Venice in 1515, and the Concerto Palatino in Bologna between 1519 and 1521
    - Augustine (bur. London, 24 October 1604)
    - Lodovico (bur. London, 18 July 1593)
  - Jasper [Gasparo] (bur. London, 8 May 1577)
  - John [Zuane] (died Venice, Sept–Dec 1570)
  - Anthony [Antonio] (i) (bur. London, 19 October 1574)
    - Lucretia Bassano, married Nicholas Lanier the Elder, French flute and cornett player
    - Mark Anthony (born London, 10 January 1546; died London, 11 September 1599)
    - Arthur (born London, 31 October 1547; bur. London, 10 September 1624)
      - Anthony (ii) (born London, 15 October 1579; bur. London, 22 April 1658)
    - Andrea (born London, 12 August 1554; bur. Horne, Surrey, 3 August 1626)
      - Thomas (?bap. London, 27 February 1589; bur. London, 29 September 1617)
    - Edward (i) (born London, 19 October 1551; bur. London, 25 May 1615)
    - Jeronimo (ii) (born London, 11 March 1559; bur. Waltham Abbey, Essex, 22 August 1635)
      - Scipio (bap. London, 11 December 1586; died London, 26 November 1613)
      - Edward (ii) (bap. London, 28 December 1588; died London, 22 October 1638)
      - Henry (bap. London, 8 April 1597; bur. London, 29 August 1665)
  - Jacomo (in Venice between 1542 and 1545)
      - Giovanni Bassano (grandson of Jacomo, born ?Venice, 1560/61; died Venice, 16 August 1617)
  - Baptista (bur. London, 11 April 1576)
    - Aemilia Bassano (1569–1645), poet, married Alfonso Lanier (died 1613)
- Bedford family of English musicians
- Herbert Bedford (1867–1945)
- Liza Lehmann (1862–1918), married Herbert Bedford in 1894
  - Leslie Herbert Bedford (1900–1989), inventor, married to Lesley Duff (1903–1987), singer.
    - Peter Lehmann Bedford (1931–2001)
    - David Bedford (1937–2011)
    - Steuart Bedford (1939–2021)
- Borsdorf family of horn players, the younger generation changed their surname to Bradley
- Adolf Borsdorf (1854–1923), German horn player, founder player London Symphony Orchestra
  - Oskar Borsdorf (a.k.a. Oscar Bradley, 1889–1948), German-English horn player, composer and conductor, active in America
  - Francis Bradley (born 1899, died after 1976), English horn player, founder player BBC Symphony Orchestra (1930), London Philharmonic (1933). He changed his name from Borsdorf during the 1st World War
  - Emil Borsdorf (1903–1969), English horn player, BBC Television Orchestra, London Symphony Orchestra
- The Brain family, founded a great school of horn playing in England
- Alfred Edwin Brain Sr., (1860–1929) horn player, founding member of the London Symphony Orchestra in 1904
  - Alfred Brain (1885–1966), horn player, emigrated to the US in 1923
  - Aubrey Brain (1893–1955), horn player, succeeded his teacher Adolf Borsdorf as professor of horn, Royal Academy of Music, married singer Marion Beeley (1887–1954) in 1914.
    - Leonard Brain (1915–1975), oboist Royal Philharmonic Orchestra, Dennis Brain Wind Ensemble
    - Dennis Brain (1921–1957), virtuoso horn player
- The Bull family of Norway, including musicians
- Ole Bull (1810–1880), Norwegian virtuoso violinist and composer
  - Sverre Hagerup Bull (1892–1976) Norwegian banker, composer and writer
    - Edvard Hagerup Bull (1922–2012), composer

- The Carter family, English organists, three of whom were later active in Canada
- John Carter (1802–????), organist at St Matthew's, Bethnal Green, married Anne Leach, 1831
  - John Carter (1832–1916), organist and composer, emigrated to Canada in 1853
  - George Carter (1835–1890), organist and composer, emigrated to Canada in 1861, organist at Christ Church Cathedral, Montreal.
  - Henry Carter (1837–1901), organist and composer, emigrated to Canada 1850s and to the US in 1864
  - William Carter (1838–1917), organist and composer, founded the original Royal Albert Hall choir
- Casadesus family, prominent French artistic family including many musicians (1870s-1990s)
- Cesi family of pianists from Italy
- Beniamino Cesi (1845–1907), pianist, composer and teacher
  - Napoleone Cesi (1867–1961), pianist and composer
    - Cecilia Cesi (1903–1984), pianist
  - Sigismondo Cesi (1869–1936), pianist and composer
- Chaplin family, members of the Chaplin Trio, reviving early music in England from 1889 until the late 1920s
- Couperin family, musical dynasty of professional composers and performers of the French Baroque (17th—18th centuries)
- Cramer family of German musicians, active in England
- Jakob Cramer (1705–70), Mannheim violinist
  - Wilhelm Cramer (1746–1799), violinist and conductor
    - Johann [John] Baptist Cramer (1771–1858), pianist, composer and music publisher
    - Franz [François] Cramer (1772–1848), violinist, Master of the King's Music from 1837

- Devriès family of Dutch opera singers over three generations (1830s-1940s)
- Dolmetsch family, Swiss-French-British family, influential in the 20th-century revival of early music.
- Draper family, English musical family including two pioneering clarinetists, Charles and Haydn.
- Samuel Draper (1824–1888), amateur cellist and flautist
  - Paul Draper (1854–1922), bassoonist, teacher, military musician
    - Marion Draper (1887–????), violinist and pianist
    - Haydn Draper (1889–1934), clarinetist, military and orchestral player
    - Mendelssohn Draper (1891–1970), bass clarinet specialist, orchestral player
  - Richard Draper (1857–1938), bassoonist, Queen's Hall Orchestra, D’Oyle Carte and Carl Rosa Opera companies.
  - Charles Draper (1869–1952), "the grandfather of English clarinetists"
    - Charles Carrington Draper (1897–1930), violinist
    - Paul Beaumont Draper (1899–1971), bassoonist, founder member of the Melos Ensemble
- Düben family, exerted a significant influence on the golden age of music (17th century) at the Swedish Royal Court Orchestra

- Dvořák/Suk family of Czech composers and musicians
- Antonín Dvořák (1841–1904), composer, married Anna Dvořáková (1854–1931), contralto and violist
  - Otilie Suková (1878–1905), pianist and composer, married Josef Suk (1875–1935), composer and violinist
    - Josef Suk (1901–1951), engineer, established Josef Suk Memorial
      - Josef Suk (1929–2011), violinist, violist, chamber musician and conductor
- Fawcett family of 19th and 20th century professional orchestral players and amateur musicians from Yorkshire

- Gibbons family of English composers and musicians
- Edward Gibbons (1568– on or before 1650), choirmaster and composer
- Ellis Gibbons (1573–1603), composer
- Ferdinando Gibbons (c1582–????), musician
- Orlando Gibbons (1583–1625), composer and keyboard player
  - Christopher Gibbons (1615–1676), composer and organist
- Godfrey family of English bandmasters and musicians
- Charles Godfrey (1790–1863), bandmaster, Coldstream Guards, civilian bandmaster
  - Daniel Godfrey (1831–1903), bandmaster, Grenadier Guards
    - Daniel Eyers Godfrey (1868–1939), conductor, founder of the Bournemouth Municipal Orchestra
      - Dan Godfrey III (1893–1935), BBC Manchester (1920s), first full-time conductor of the BBC Wireless Orchestra
  - Fred Godfrey (1837–1882), bandmaster, Coldstream Guards
  - Charles Godfrey II. (1839–1919), bandmaster, Royal Horse Guards
    - Charles George Godfrey (1866–1935), composer, bandmaster, musical director of spa resorts, Buxton, Scarborough
    - Arthur Eugene Godfrey (1868–1939), organist, composer, musical director of the Shaftesbury Theatre
    - Herbert A Godfrey (1870–1952), bandmaster, Christ's Hospital, Crystal Palace Military Band
    - Edwina ("Winnie") Godfrey, pianist, studied Royal College of Music, 1890s
    - Rosaline ("Rosie") Godfrey, singer, pianist, studied Royal College of Music, 1890s
- Goossens family of conductors, composers and performers, moved from Belgium to Britain in 1873
- Eugène Goossens, père (1845–1906), Belgian conductor
  - Eugène Goossens, fils (1867–1958) (a.k.a. Eugène Goossens II), French-born conductor and violinist
    - Eugene Aynsley Goossens (1893–1962) (a.k.a. Eugène Goossens III), English conductor and composer
    - Marie Goossens (1894–1991), English harpist
    - Adolphe Goossens (1896–1916), English horn player, killed at the Battle of the Somme
    - Léon Goossens (1897–1988), English oboist
    - Sidonie Goossens (1899–2004), English harpist
- Grimson family of classical musicians active in London from the early 1870s

- Hambourg family, of Russian origins
- Michael Hambourg (1855–1916), Russian pianist, pupil of Nikolai Rubinstein, emigrated to London (1890), then Canada (1910)
  - Mark Hambourg (1879–1960), internationally famous pianist
    - Michal Augusta Hambourg (1919–2004), pianist
  - Jan Hambourg (1882–1947), violinist, music editor, active in Europe as a concert violinist
  - Boris Hambourg (1885–1954), cellist, settled in Toronto, Canada (1910)
  - Clement Hambourg (1900–1973), Canadian pianist and jazz promoter,
- Alexander Hambourg (1870–????), conductor, came to England in 1896
  - Charles Hambourg (1895–1979), cellist and conductor
- Hann family of English musicians from South London
- William Henry Hann, viola (1831–1920) (married to Sophie Hopkins of the Hopkins family, see below)
  - Edward Hopkins Hann (1861–1929), violin, founding member of London Symphony Orchestra
  - William Charles Hann (1863–1926), cellist, Philharmonic Society Orchestra
  - Lewis Robert Hann (1865–1937), violinist, composer, music professor at Cheltenham Ladies College
  - Sydney Herbert Hann (1867–1921), organist, pianist, hymn tune composer, teacher
  - Clement Walter Hann (1870–1921), cellist, 2nd violin, Philharmonic Society Orchestra
  - Marianne Sophia Hann (1878–1926), mezzo soprano, teacher
- Hannikainen family of Finnish composers and performers
- Pekka Juhani Hannikainen (1854–1924), composer
- Alli Hannikainen (1867–1949), choir director and singing teacher, wife of Pekka
  - Lauri Hannikainen (1889-1921), journalist
    - Heikki Hannikainen (1915–1989), diplomat
      - Ann-Elise Hannikainen (1946–2012), composer
  - Ilmari Hannikainen (1892–1955), pianist and composer
  - Tauno Hannikainen (1896–1968), cellist and conductor
  - Arvo Hannikainen (1897–1942), violinist and composer, married Mary Hannikainen (1901–1974), soprano and actor
  - Väinö Hannikainen (1900–1960), harpist and composer
      - Tuomas Hannikainen (born 1965), conductor and violinist
- Hanssens family of Flemish musicians
- Joseph-Jean Hanssens (c1770–1816)
- Charles-Louis-Joseph Hanssens (1777–1852)
  - Charles-Louis Hanssens (1802–1871)
- The Harrison family, four English sisters, all musical child prodigies
- Annie Harrison, singer (Royal College of Music), wife of Colonel John Harrison, amateur flautist
  - May Harrison (1890–1959), violinist
  - Beatrice Harrison (1892–1965), cellist
  - Monica Harrison (1897–1983), mezzo–soprano
  - Margaret Harrison ((1899–1995), violinist
- Hellmesberger family of Viennese musicians, established the Hellmesberger Quartet in 1849
- Georg Hellmesberger Sr. (1800–1873), Austrian violinist, conductor and composer
  - Joseph Hellmesberger Sr. (1828–1893), Austrian violinist, conductor and composer
  - Georg Hellmesberger Jr. (1830–1852), Austrian violinist and composer
    - Joseph Hellmesberger Jr. (1855–1907) (a.k.a. Pepi Hellmesberger), Austrian composer, violinist and conductor
    - Ferdinand Hellmesberger (1863–1940), Austrian cellist and conductor
- Hewitt-Jones family of English musicians
- Tony Hewitt-Jones (1926–1989), English composer, conductor, organist and music organizer, married Anita Hewitt-Jones (1926-2007), cellist and composer
  - Tim Hewitt-Jones, cellist, London Symphony Orchestra, Royal Opera House, married Gill, music teacher
    - Simon Hewitt Jones, (b. 1982), violinist
    - Thomas Hewitt Jones, (b. 1984), composer
  - Caroline Hewitt Jones, (b.1952), violinist and music educator, married Alan Lumsden, early music scholar.
- Jenny Hewitt-Jones (1930-2025), violinist, Liverpool Philharmonic and teacher, sister of Tony
  - Penny Hewitt-Jones (d. 2022), cellist
- Hobday family of English musicians
- Charles Dunn Hobday had a music-selling business in Faversham, and later Rochester
  - Bessie Hobday, pianist
  - Alfred Charles Hobday (1870–1942), viola player, married to the Irish pianist Ethel Hobday, née Sharpe (1872–1947)
  - Claude Hobday (1872–1954) double bass player
  - Maud Hobday (1874–1941), violinist and pianist
  - Gertrude Hobday, pianist and singer
- Hopkins family of English instrumentalists, particularly early clarinetists and organists
- Edward Hopkins (c1757–c1790), horn player
  - Edward Hopkins (1779–1859), bandmaster (Scots Guards), violinist and clarinetist
    - Louise Lloyd, née Hopkins (c1817–1880), RAM, music teacher
    - Richard Lloyd, married to Louise Lloyd, counter tenor and vicar choral at Westminster Abbey
      - Edward Lloyd (1845–1927), tenor
    - Edward Hopkins (1818–1842), organist at Armagh Cathedral
    - John Larkin Hopkins (1819–1873), organist and composer
    - Sophia Hann, née Hopkins (1835– died before 1912), married viola player W.H. Hann (see 'Hann' above)
    - Eliza Frances Hopkins (c1837–1921), married Charles Ould, cellist (see 'Ould', below)
  - George Hopkins (????–1869), clarinetist
    - Edward John Hopkins (1818–1901), organist (Temple Church) and composer
    - John Hopkins (1822–1900), organist at Rochester Cathedral
    - Thomas Hopkins (1826–1893), organist at St Saviour's Church, York, organ builder
- Hotteterre family of French wind instrument makers and wind performers
- Loys de Haulteterre (c1550–1625), wood-turner from Normandy
  - Jean Hotteterre I (c1605–1691), instrument maker, Paris, creator of the oboe?
    - Martin Hotteterre (c1640–1712), instrument maker
      - Jacques-Martin Hotteterre (1674–1763), flute virtuoso
      - Jean Hotteterre (c1677–1720), instrument maker

- Järvi family of conductors, composers and performers, of Estonian origin

- Kanneh-Mason family, British musical siblings of Antiguan descent

Isata Kanneh-Mason (born 27 May 1996) pianist
Sheku Kanneh-Mason (born 4 April 1999), cellist
Braimah Kanneh-Mason (born 2000), violinist
Konya Kanneh-Mason (born 2003), violin and piano
Jeneba Kanneh-Mason (born 2004), cello and piano
Aminata Kanneh-Mason (born 2007), violin and piano
Mariatu Kanneh-Mason (born 2011), cello and piano

- Kerzelli family, large family of musicians of Italian, Czech or Austrian origin

- Lanier family of French musicians who settled in the English royal court (see also Bassano family, above)
- John Lanier (died 1572), moved to London 1561
- Nicholas Lanier the Elder (c1532–1612), French musician who played the flute and the cornett, moved to London 1561, married Lucretia Bassano (1556–1632)
  - John Lanier (died 1616), sackbut player, married Frances Galliardello, daughter of Mark Anthony Galliardello, viol player
    - John Lanier
    - Nicholas Lanier (c1588–1666), composer and musician, first Master of the King's Music
  - Alfonso Lanier (1572–1613), wind player, married Aemilia Bassano (1569–1645), poet
    - Henry Lanier (1593–1633), in the royal band
  - Innocent Lanier (c1573–1625), wind player
  - Andrea Lanier (1582–1660), wind player
  - Clement Lanier (c1590 1661), wind player
  - Jerome Lanier (died 1657), wind player
    - William Lanier (1618–c1660), in the royal band
- Linley family of English musicians
- Thomas Linley the elder (1733–1795), English bass and musician, active in Bath
  - Elizabeth Ann Linley (1754–1792), singer, married Richard Brinsley Sheridan
  - Thomas Linley the younger (1756–1778), composer and violinist, "the English Mozart"
  - Mary Linley (1758–1787), singer, married Richard Tickell
  - Samuel Linley (1760–1778), singer and oboist
  - Maria Linley (1763–1784), singer
  - Ozias Thurston Linley (1765–1831), organist
  - Jane Nash Linley (1768–1806), amateur singer
  - William Linley (1771–1835), singer and composer of glees
- Lloyd Webber family of English musicians
- William Lloyd Webber (1914–1982), English organist and composer
  - Andrew Lloyd Webber, Baron Lloyd-Webber (born 1948), English composer of musical theatre
    - Imogen Lloyd Webber (born 1978) English theatre producer
    - Nicholas Lloyd Webber (1979–2023), English composer and music producer
  - Julian Lloyd Webber (born 1951), English cellist, married cellist Jiaxin Cheng in 2009
- Lupo family of court musicians in England in the 16th and 17th centuries

- Mendelssohn family, extensive German Jewish family, descendants of Mendel of Dessau
- Moses Mendelssohn (1729–1786), philosopher
  - Joseph Mendelssohn (1770–1848), banker
    - Alexander Mendelssohn (1798–1871), banker
      - Franz von Mendelssohn (1829–1889), banker
        - Robert von Mendelssohn (1857–1917), banker, married Giulietta Gordigiani (1871–1957), pianist
          - Francesco von Mendelssohn (1901–1972), cellist, theatre director, art collector
        - Franz von Mendelssohn (1865–1935), banker, married Maria Westphal (1867–1957)
          - Lilli von Mendelssohn (1897–1928), violinist, married Emil Bohnke, violist and composer
            - Robert-Alexander Bohnke (1927–2005), pianist
  - Abraham Mendelssohn Bartholdy (1776–1835), banker
    - Fanny Mendelssohn (1805–1847) composer and pianist
    - Felix Mendelssohn (Jakob Ludwig Felix Mendelssohn Bartholdy) (1809–1847), composer
  - Nathan Mendelssohn (1781–1852) instrument maker
    - Wilhelm Mendelssohn (1821–1866)
      - Arnold Ludwig Mendelssohn (1855–1933), composer
- Menuhin family of American musicians
- Yehudi Menuhin (1916–1999), American-born British violinist and conductor
- Hephzibah Menuhin (1920–1981), American-Australian pianist and writer
- Yaltah Menuhin (1921–2001), American-born British pianist, artist and poet
  - Jeremy Menuhin (born 1951), composer and pianist
- Moralt family: 18 members in the Munich Hofkapelle orchestra between 1787 and 1920
- Adam Moralt (c1741–1811), orchestral manager
  - Johann Wilhelm Moralt (1774 – died after 1842), viola player
    - Wilhelm Moralt (1815–1874), violinist, (the second) Moralt Quartet
  - Joseph Moralt (1775–1855), violinist, Moralt String Quartet
  - Johann Baptist Moralt (1777–1825), violinist and composer, Moralt String Quartet
  - Jacob Moralt (1780–1820), violinist, Moralt String Quartet
  - Philipp Moralt (1780–1830) cellist, dedicatee of Danzi's Cello Concerto in E minor
    - Peter Moralt (1814– died after 1866), violinist
    - Theodor Moralt (1817–1877), treasurer for the Royal Theater, Munich
        - Rudolf Moralt (1902–1958), conductor, grandson of Theodor
  - John Alvis Moralt (1780–1830s?), viola player, married Sophia Giustina Dussek (1775– c1831), singer, pianist and composer
  - Clementine Moralt (1797–1845), contralto
- Mozart family, ancestors, relatives and descendants of Wolfgang Amadeus Mozart
- Leopold Mozart (1719–1787), court musician, violin pedagogue, married Anna Maria Walburg Mozart née Pertl (1720–1778)
  - Maria Anna Mozart (called "Nannerl") (1751–1829), keyboard player, celebrated child prodigy, married Johann Baptist Franz Berchtold zu Sonnenburg (1736–1801)
  - Wolfgang Amadeus Mozart (1756–1791), composer, married soprano Maria Constanze Weber (1762–1842)
    - Franz Xaver Wolfgang Mozart (1791–1844), composer, pianist, conductor and teacher
- The Mukle family of England, originally from Germany
- Leopold Mukle (c1829 – died after 1896), German born organ builder, originally from the Black Forest, active in England
  - Anne Mukle (1866–1941), pianist
  - Flora Mukle (1873–????), singer
  - Lillian Mukle (1874–????), trumpeter
  - Fred Mukle (c1877–????), organ builder
  - Louisa Mukle (1879–????), musician
  - May Mukle (1880–1963), cellist and composer
  - Stanley Herbert Mukle (1883–1970), organ builder
    - Nora Mukle (1911-1993), double bass player, wife of Vernon Elliott
      - Naomi Elliott (born 1938), cellist
- Münch family of Alsatian French conductors
- Ernst Münch (1859–1928), organist and choir conductor
  - Fritz Münch (1890–1970), music administrator and conductor
  - Charles Munch (1891–1968), symphonic conductor and violinist
- Eugen Münch, conductor, brother of Ernst
  - Hans Münch (1893–1983), conductor

- Naylor family of English organists and composers
- John Naylor (1838–1897), composer and organist of York Minster
  - Edward Woodall Naylor (1867–1934), organist and composer
    - Bernard Naylor (1907–1986), English Canadian composer, conductor, organist
  - Charles Legh Naylor (1869–1945), organist of St. Peter's Church, Harrogate
- George Frederick Naylor (1851–1920), composer and organist in England and New Zealand
- Novello family of English musicians and music publishers
- Vincent Novello (1781–1861), musician and music publisher
  - Mary Cowden Clarke, née Novello (1809–1898), editor of The Musical Times from 1853 to 1856
  - Joseph Alfred Novello (1810–1896), music publisher (Novello and Company)
  - Cecilia Serle (née Novello) (1812–1890), actress and singer, wife of Thomas James Serle
  - Clara Novello (1818–1908), acclaimed soprano
  - Sabilla Novello (1821–1904), singer, teacher and translator

- Ould family of English musicians
- Charles Ould (1835–1913), cellist, married Eliza Frances Hopkins in 1862 (see 'Hopkins', above)
  - Charles Hopkins Ould, organist and pianist (1865–????)
  - Percy Ould, violinist (1868-????)
  - Kate Emma Ould, cellist (????-????)
  - Mary Ould, violinist and pianist (1879-????)

- Philidor family of French court musicians (1580s to 1790s)
- Piffet family of French violinists and composers
- Pierre Piffet (born late 17th century; died after 1760)
  - Pierre-Louis Piffet (c1706–1773)
  - Joseph-Antoine Piffet (c1710– died late 18th century)
    - Louis-François-Barthélemy Piffet (1734–1779)
- Puccini family of Italian musicians over five generations
- Jacopo Puccini (1712–1781)
  - Antonio Puccini (1747–1832), composer and organist
    - Domenico Puccini (1772–1815), composer
      - Michele Puccini (1813–1864), teacher, composer, organist
        - Giacomo Puccini (1858–1924), opera composer

- Sanderling family of German conductors
- Kurt Sanderling (1912–2011), conductor
- Barbara Sanderling (born 1938), double bass player, wife of Kurt
  - Thomas Sanderling (born 1942), German conductor, born in the Soviet Union
  - Stefan Sanderling (born 1964), conductor
  - Michael Sanderling (born 1967), conductor and cellist
- Scarlatti family of Italian composers from the Baroque and classical eras
- Alessandro Scarlatti (1660–1757), composer known for operas and chamber cantatas
  - Pietro Filippo Scarlatti (1679–1750), composer, organist and choirmaster
  - Domenico Scarlatti (1685–1757), composer best known for his keyboard music
- Anna Maria (1661–1703), singer
- Melchiorra Brigada Scarlatti (1663–1736), singer
- Francesco Scarlatti (1666–1741), composer
- Tommaso Scarlatti (c1669–1760), tenor
  - Giuseppe Scarlatti (1718 or 1723–1777), composer of Opera seria and Opera buffa
  - Rosa Scarlatti (1727–1777), opera singer
- Schnabel family of Austrian musicians
- Artur Schnabel (1882–1951), pianist, composer and pedagogue, married to German contralto Therese Behr-Schnabel (1876–1959)
  - Karl Ulrich Schnabel (1909–2001), pianist, married to American pianist Helen Schnabel (1911–1974)
- The Simonson family of French origins, active in Australia and New Zealand
- Fanny Simonsen (1835–1896), soprano,
  - Leonora Martina Simonsen (1859–1884), soprano, married David Davis.
    - Frances Alda née Davis (1879–1952), New Zealand soprano
- Strauss family of Austrian composers
- Johann Strauss I (1804–1849), composer
  - Johann Strauss II (1825–1899), composer of dance music and operettas, including The Blue Danube, married Henrietta Treffz (1818–1878), opera singer
  - Josef Strauss (1827–1870), composer
  - Eduard Strauss (1835–1916), composer
    - Johann Strauss III (1866–1939), composer
      - Eduard Strauss II (1910–1969), conductor, nephew of Johann Strauss III
- Szervánszky family of Hungarian musicians
- Jenő Szervánszky (1906–2005), artist
  - Valéria Szervánszky (born 1947), pianist
- Endre Szervánszky (1911–1977), composer
- Péter Szervánszky (1913–1985), violinist

- Tcherepnin family of Russian musicians
- Nikolai Tcherepnin (1873–1945), composer, pianist and conductor
  - Alexander Tcherepnin (1899–1977), composer and pianist, married Chinese pianist Lee Hsien Ming (1911–1991)
    - Serge Tcherepnin (born 1941), composer, electronic instrument builder
    - Ivan Tcherepnin (1943–1998), composer and electronic music innovator

- Vecoli family of Italian composers and musicians from Lucca
- The Verne sisters, (née Würm), English pianists of German descent

Mary Wurm (1860–1938), pianist and composer
Alice Verne-Bredt (1864–1958), piano teacher, violinist and composer
Mathilde Verne (1865–1936), pianist and teacher
Adela Verne (1877–1952), pianist

- Wagner family, ancestors, relatives and descendants of Richard Wagner.
- Walenn family, Walenn String Quartet (1890s), annual Waleen Chamber concerts series
- Skene Charlotte Walenn (née Barth, 1837-1927), British musical amateur, mother of 15 children
  - Isabella Walenn (1857–1936), Royal Choral Society
  - Ellie Walenn (1858–1929), musician and for 15 years head teacher at Roedean School
  - James Walenn (1860–1884), composer, from 1879 organist at St Alban's Holborn, conductor of the St Alban's Choral Society
  - Arthur Walenn (mid-1860s–1937), viola player, dubut as baritone, Queen's Hall, November 1895
  - Charles Walenn (1867–1948), singer and actor comic baritone roles in the Gilbert and Sullivan operas
  - Frederick Dudley Walenn (1869-1933), amateur musician and the composer
  - Herbert Walenn (1870–1953), cellist (Kruse Quartet and Walenn Quartet)
  - Gerald Walenn (1871–1942), violinist and composer, leader of the Walenn Quartet, emigrated to Australia in 1917
  - Dorothea Walenn (1875–1948) taught violin at St Paul's Girls' School, performed in the Walenn Quartet
- Alice Barth (1848–1910), operatic soprano, sister of Skene
- Wallfisch family of British musicians
- Peter Wallfisch (1924–1993), concert pianist, married Anita Lasker-Wallfisch (born 1925), German-British cellist
  - Raphael Wallfisch (born 1953), cellist, married Elizabeth Wallfisch, née Hunt (born 1952), Australian Baroque violinist
    - Benjamin Wallfisch (born 1979), composer, conductor and music producer
    - Simon Wallfisch (born 1982), classical singer and cellist
    - Joanna Wallfisch (born 1985), singer-songwriter and jazz singer
- Weber Family, German musical family
- Fridolin Weber (1733–1779), prompter and music copyist
  - Josepha Weber, (1758–1819), opera singer
  - Aloysia Weber (1760–1839), opera singer
  - Constanze Weber (1762–1842), opera singer, wife of Wolfgang Amadeus Mozart
  - Maria Sophie Weber (1763–1846), opera singer
- Franz Anton Weber (1734–1812), musician, conductor and theatre director, married opera singer and actress Genovefa Weber (1764–1798)
  - Carl Maria von Weber (1786–1826), composer, conductor, pianist
- Wesley family, English founders of Methodism and noted musicians
- Charles Wesley (1707–1758), principal leader of the Methodist movement, prolific hymnwriter, married harpsichord player and singer Sarah Wesley (1726–1832)
  - Charles Wesley junior (1757–1834), organist and composer
  - Samuel Wesley (1766–1837), organist and composer, ('the English Mozart')
    - Samuel Sebastian Wesley (1810–1876), organist and composer
- Willmann family of German/Austrian musicians
- Johann Ignaz Willmann (1739–1815), flute/violin/cello player and conductor
  - Maximilian Willmann (1767–1813), cellist
  - Walburga Willmann (1769–1835), pianist
  - Magdalena Willmann (1771–1801), singer
- Marianne Willmann (1768–1813), singer, second wife of Johann
  - Caroline Willmann (1796–c1860), singer, daughter of Johann and Marianne
- Winterbottom family of British military band musicians in 19th and 20th centuries

- Young family of English musicians
- Anthony Young (1683–1747), organist and composer.
- Charles Young (1686–1758), organist and composer
  - Charles Young (17??-????), clerk to the Treasury
    - Isabella Young (circa late 1720s–1791), mezzo-soprano and organist
    - Elizabeth Young (173??–1773), contralto and actress
    - Polly Young (1749–1799), soprano, composer and keyboard player, married French violinist, pedagogue and composer François-Hippolyte Barthélémon in 1766
      - Cecilia Maria Barthélemon (1767–1859), singer, composer, pianist, and organist
  - Cecilia Young (1712–1789), celebrated soprano, married composer Thomas Arne in 1737
    - Michael Arne (1740–1786), composer, harpsichordist, organist, singer and actor
  - Isabella Lampe (1715–1795), soprano, married composer John Frederick Lampe in 1737
    - Charles John Frederick Lampe (1739–1767), composer and organist, married singer married Ann Smith
  - Esther Young (1717–1795), soprano, married music publisher Charles Jones
