= Willmann =

Willmann is a surname. Notable persons with that name include:

- Caroline Willmann (1796–1860), German singer
- Emma Willmann (born 1985), American stand-up comedian and actress
- George J. Willmann (1897–1977), US-born Jesuit priest in the Philippines
- Magdalena Willmann (1771–1801), German singer
- Marianne Willmann (1768–1813), German singer
- Maximilian Willmann (1767–1813), German cellist
- Michael Willmann (1630–1706), German painter
- Walburga Willmann (1769–1835), German pianist

== See also ==
- Willman
