= Hannikainen =

Hannikainen is a Finnish surname. Notable people with the surname include:

== Hannikainen family of musicians ==
- Alli Hannikainen (1867–1949), Finnish choir director and singing teacher
- Ann-Elise Hannikainen (1946–2012), Finnish composer
- Arvo Hannikainen (1897–1942), Finnish violinist and composer
- Väinö Hannikainen (1900–1960), Finnish harpist and composer
- Ilmari Hannikainen (1892–1955), Finnish pianist and composer
- Pekka Juhani Hannikainen (1854–1924), Finnish composer
- Tauno Hannikainen (1896–1968), Finnish cellist and conductor
- Tuomas Hannikainen (born 1965), Finnish conductor and violinist

== Others ==
- Pietari Hannikainen (1813–1899), Finnish writer and journalist
- Heikki Hannikainen (1915–1989), Finnish diplomat
- Markus Hännikäinen (born 1993), Finnish ice hockey player
