= London College of Music =

Music school, part of the University of West London

Coordinates: 51.5100°N 0.3068°W

- Established: 1887; 139 years ago
- Location: Ealing, West London, W5 5RF, UK
- Website: https://www.uwl.ac.uk/academic-schools/music

The London College of Music (LCM) is a music school in London, England. It is one of eight separate schools that make up the University of West London.

== History ==
The London College of Music was founded in 1887 and existed as an independent music conservatoire based at Great Marlborough Street in central London, initially at no 5 and from 1895 at no 47, until 1991. The college then moved to Ealing and became part of the University of West London.

Originally established as a Board of Examination, an independent commission for the assessment and certification of musical proficiency, the LCM expanded its activities early on by setting up an Educational Department, the leadership of which was entrusted to the British composer Alfred Caldicott in 1892.

Former principals of the LCM include William Lloyd Webber (the father of composer Andrew Lloyd Webber and cellist and conductor Julian Lloyd Webber), John McCabe and Professor Colin Lawson (who held the post of Dean of LCM until his appointment as Director of the Royal College of Music in 2005).

== Composition Faculty ==
A long-standing Chair of Composition and Head of Research was Francis Pott, widely known as a composer of sacred choral music. Past visiting professors at LCM have included Guy Woolfenden, Nick Ingman and (following his retirement from the role of Principal) John McCabe.

A long-running programme of weekly "Composers' Workshops" has included guest presentations by (among others) Stephen Montague, Jonathan Dove, Judith Weir, David Sawer, Judith Bingham, Deirdre Gribbin, Augusta Read Thomas, Param Vir, Philip Grange, Jonty Harrison, Nigel Hess, Andrew Poppy and Simon Holt.

== Piano Department ==
The department's historical faculty included the celebrated Chopin specialist John Vallier (1920–1991). Vallier’s own teacher, his aunt Mathilde Verne, was a pupil of Clara Schumann. Vallier’s distinct pedagogical lineage was directly carried forward at the college by his student, the acclaimed concert pianist and recording artist Raphael Terroni (1945–2012), who subsequently served as the institution's Head of Piano for fifteen years. This core teaching tradition has been historically augmented by a prestigious lineage of piano masterclasses presented by Martino Tirimo, John Lill, Howard Shelley, Malcolm Binns, and several other distinguished artists.

Building upon this heritage, the college achieved a landmark milestone in 2011 by officially becoming London's first "All-Steinway School." This designation ensures that all modern teaching studios, recording complexes and performance venues are exclusively equipped with Steinway & Sons instruments.

== LCM Examinations ==
A central pillar of the LCM's prestige is the London College of Music Examinations (LCME). Established in 1887, this global examination board is fully integrated into the institution and administers graded music examinations and diplomas across an international network of centres, anchoring the College's worldwide academic footprint.

== Music Technology ==
The music technology department of LCM incorporates 25 recording studios, plus the Native Instruments Labs. As well as offering music technology courses at undergraduate and postgraduate level, LCM is an official Native Instruments training centre and offers Apple certified Logic, Pro Tools and Ableton Live training courses. The music technology teaching staff includes Grammy Award winning record producer Pip Williams, Journal on the Art of Record Production editor Simon Zagorski-Thomas, producer Paul Borg, and long-time Transglobal Underground collaborator Larry Whelan.

== Notable alumni ==
- Raphael Terroni (Classical pianist)
- John Treleaven (Opera singer)
- Rosalind Sutherland (Soprano)
- Laura Mitchell (Soprano and pianist)
- Clive Nolan (keyboardist and producer)
- Robert Orton (audio engineer)
- Richard Wright (Pink Floyd keyboardist)

== See also ==
- Royal College of Music
- Royal Academy of Music
- Guildhall School of Music
- Royal Northern College of Music
