= Vecoli family =

The Vecoli family were Italian composers and musicians from Lucca. The family relationship between the three is not known.

- Regolo Vecoli (fl. 1557–1586): some of his songs are included in a six-volume collection of Neapolitan songs published in Venice in 1751. It was reported in 1824 that his Madrigali à 5 voci, published in Lyons in 1577, was held in Munich public library.
- Francesco Vecoli (fl. 1575–1597)
- Pietro Vecoli (fl. 1580–1597): it was reported in 1824 that his Madrigali à 5 voci, published in Turin in 1581, was held in Munich public library. His work "Intermèdes des Satyres" was included in an album Inconstance et Vanité du Monde: Musique aux cours de France et de Savoie en 1601 released on the Naive label.

== See also ==
List of musical families (classical music)
