= Alice Verne-Bredt =

English piano teacher, violinist and composer

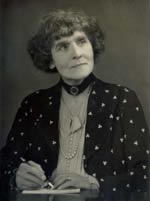
- Alice Verne-Bredt around 1920.
- Born: Alice Barbara Würm; 1864; Southampton
- Died: 1958 (aged 93–94); London
- Occupation: Pianist
- Known for: Innovator of percussion bands for children in Great Britain.
- Spouse: William Bredt
- Relatives: Adela Verne (sister); Mathilde Verne (sister); Mary Wurm (sister); John Vallier (nephew)

Alice Barbara Verne-Bredt (née Würm; 1864–1958) was an English piano teacher, violinist and composer. Three of her sisters were also noted pianists: Adela Verne, Mathilde Verne and Mary Würm (who returned to Germany and retained the original family name).

== Life and career ==
The sixth of ten children, she was born as Alice Barbara Würm in Southampton to Bavarian professional musicians who emigrated to England in the 1850s. Her father, a music teacher who specialised in zither, violin, and piano, worked as an organist. Her mother was a violinist who taught her the violin from a very early age. Later in her childhood she moved to London, where she lived all her life, and there was taught piano by Robert and Clara Schumann's daughter, Marie.

Alice wanted to become a singer, but typhoid fever affected her voice. In 1893, her family anglicized their surname from Würm to Verne, and Alice married William Bredt, an amateur musician and conductor. Both greatly contributed to the success of the piano school set up in London by her sister Mathilde in 1909. During the same period she also established The Twelve O'Clock Concerts, a successful concert series for chamber music at the Aeolian Hall in London, where some of her own chamber music was performed.

Alice took over the school's junior department, where Lady Elizabeth Bowes-Lyon, later Queen Elizabeth the Queen Mother, had a wedding march written especially for her. There she became a pioneer of children's music education and an innovator in the use of percussion bands for that purpose. She died in London in 1958.

== Selected works ==
Few of her works were published. Perhaps the best known is the Phantasie Trio of 1908 for piano, violin and cello, which won a supplementary prize in the annual Cobbett chamber music competition, inaugurated two years before. It was recorded in 2005 by the Summerhayes Piano Trio.

=== Chamber music ===
- Cello Sonata
- Phantasie Piano Trio (1908) – performed at the Aeolian and Bechstein Halls on 25 January 1912.
- Phantasie Piano Quartet (1908) (unpublished)
- Phantasie Piano Quintet (no date, unpublished)
- Piano Trio, No. 2
- Piano Trio, No. 3
- Wiegenlied (lullaby) for violin and piano (1911)

=== Piano music ===
- Arrangement of Pavane: from King Henry VIII's Pavyn (1924)
- Four easy inventions for young pianists (1920)
  - Musical box
  - The little drum
  - Concert study
  - The doll's promenade
- Polacca (Polka) for piano and orchestra (also for string accompaniment)
- Valse (1913)
- Valse Miniature for two pianos (1913)

== See also ==
- Adela Verne
- Mathilde Verne
- Mary Wurm
- The Grimson family
- Musical Families (classical music)
