= Wilman (name) =

Wilman is a surname and occasional given name. A variant is Wilmans; further variants are Wilmann and Wilmanns, not covered here. Notable people named Wilman and Wilmans include:

== Wilman ==
- Andy Wilman (born 1962), English television producer
- David Wilman (born 1934), British hockey player
- Maria Wilman (1867–1957), South African geologist and botanist
- Wilman Conde (born 1982), Colombian footballer
- Wilman Modesta (born 1995), Dominican footballer

== Wilmans ==
- Edith Wilmans (1882–1966), Texas lawyer and politician

== Other ==
- Wilmans Peaks, mountain summit in Washington state, named after John McDonald Wilmans

== See also ==
- Wiilman (indigenous people)
- Willman (surname)
