= Trinity Methodist Church, Harrogate =

Church in Harrogate, North Yorkshire, England

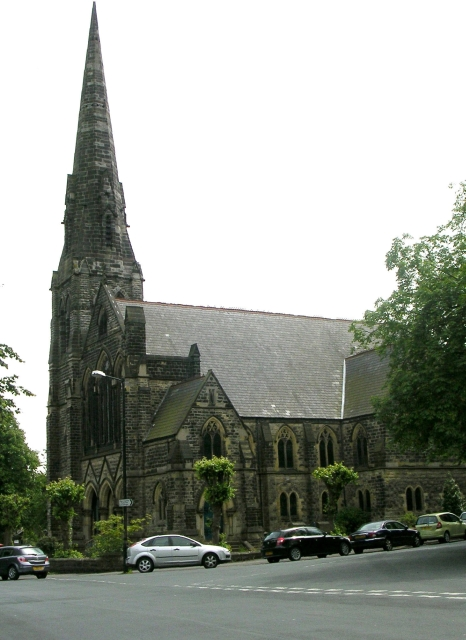
- Trinity Methodist Church

- 53°59′9.71″N 1°32′23.53″W
- OS grid reference: SE 30251 54507
- Location: Harrogate
- Country: England
- Denomination: Methodist
- Website: http://www.trinityharrogate.org.uk

Architecture
- Heritage designation: Grade II listed
- Architect: George Woodhouse
- Completed: 11 April 1879
- Construction cost: £10,000

Specifications
- Capacity: 736 persons

Trinity Methodist Church, Harrogate is located in Harrogate, North Yorkshire, England. It is a Grade II listed building.

== History ==
Construction started in October 1876 and the church opened in April 1879. It was built in the Gothic style, and comprises a 3 bay porch, 3 bay nave, with sanctuary and transepts. The architect was George Woodhouse. Matthew Wilson of Headingley was the mason, Taylor and Son of Bradford carried out the joinery work, John Baines of Ripon the slating, Morrell and Hartley of Bradford were the painters, Walmisley of Preston the glaziers and Exley and Son of Otley supplied the heating apparatus. The north west tower and spire was added in 1889.

A major renovation project was undertaken between 2009 and 2011.

== Organ ==
The church contains a 3 manual pipe organ dating from 1880 by Forster and Andrews. The specification can be found on the National Pipe Organ Register. The organ was renovated in 1923 by Brindley and Foster, and again in 1949 by Henry Willis.

=== Organists ===
- George Frederick Naylor 1894 – 1897

== See also ==
- Listed buildings in Harrogate (Stray Ward)
