= Joan Mary Last =

English music educator, author and composer

Joan Mary Last OBE (12 January 1908 – 9 October 2002) was an English music educator, author and composer born in Littlehampton, Sussex. She studied piano with Mathilde Verne and York Bowen, making her debut as a pianist at the Aeolian Hall in London in 1926. After an injury to her hand ended her performing career, Last turned to teaching and composing. She was music director in Rosemead School, Littlehampton (1930 to 1954) and director of music at Warren School, Worthing (1940 to 1961).

From 1959 she taught music at the Royal Academy of Music. From 1960 she was also an examiner for the Associated Board and an adjudicator for the British Federation of Music Festivals. She toured extensively, conducting piano teaching workshops in the United States, Canada, Africa, Scandinavia, Japan, Hong Kong, Australia and New Zealand.

Last published over 100 tutors and albums of educational music featuring her own compositions, including the multi-volume At the Keyboard series (1950s). Her compositions were typically published in themed and graded collections, such as Cats: ten little piano solos (Grade 1, 1964), Downland: twelve piano pieces (Grades 1-2, 1949) and Tree Pictures (Grade 4 to easy 5, 1957). She also published books, including The Young Pianist (OUP, 1953), and Interpretation in Piano Study (OUP, 1961). She was one of the founders of Worthing Music Festival.

She was awarded an OBE in 1988 for services to music education. Last never married, and died in Worthing Hospital, aged 94. Her address in Littlehampton was Surya, 11, St Mary's Close.
