= Pietari Hannikainen =

Finnish writer, journalist and surveyor

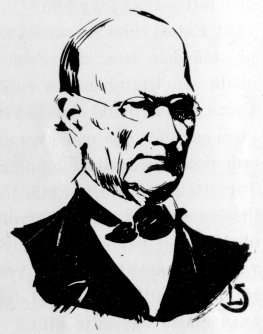

Pietari (Petter) Mikonpoika Hannikainen, surname changed to Hanén during his early years of studying until 1852, (August 24, 1813 Sääminki – September 27, 1899 Parikkala) was a Finnish writer, journalist and surveyor, and a member of the Hannikainen family of writers and musicians.

== Life ==
Hannikainen was born to parents Mikael Abrahamsson Hannikainen (b.1771), a farmowner and county judge from Sääminki Kiilanmäki, and to Katarina Löppönen (b.1785), his father’s second wife. The composer Pekka Juhani Hannikainen was Pietari Hannikainen’s nephew. He graduated in 1833 and continued studying at the University of Helsinki. During a time of Fennomania in Finland he was one of the first students to complete an examination of Finnish language. He became highly involved in the promotion of the Finnish language and in 1851 he also took back his original name of Hannikainen, which had been changed to Hanén when he started school. It was also in 1851 that he bought a farm in Parikkala where he lived until his death in 1899. He is buried in Parikkala.

Pietari Hannikainen was married to Katarina Margareta Krank (b. 1862) from 1854 to 1862. After the death of his first wife he married Emilia Savander (b. 1910) in 1864. His children from these two marriages were sons August Edvard Hannikainen (1854-1939) Hiittinen district Hitis representative, Peter Woldemar Hannikainen (1858-1928) general director of the Finnish Forest Administration Metsähallitus and State Councillor (Russia), Karl Onni Gerhard Hannikainen (1865-1930) author and rector of Kuopio Lyceum, Tauno Robert Alarik Hannikainen (1868-1953) Antrea district Kamenogorsk doctor and councillor of medicine, and daughters Armias Forsblom (1860-1946) she and her husband were tenant housekeepers of the Koitsanlahti Manor, Fanny Vilhelmiina Ilmoni (1854-1934) mother of Finnish painter Einar Ilmoni who was a student of Helene Schjerfbeck.

== Career ==
Hannikainen became a deputy surveyor in 1835 and received the title of surveyor in 1843. He worked as a deputy surveyor in Viipuri Province from 1849 as a permanent commission surveyor in 1857–1866, as a permanent commissioner 1866–1874 and as a senior commissioner 1874–1879. Parallel to his work as a surveyor Hannikainen became deeply involved in linguistic and literary aspects of Fennomania writing numerous plays and works in Finnish and working as a journalist and editor for the newspaper Kanawa. The newspaper was considered as the Finnish version of the Swedish language newspaper Saima which at the time was run by Johan Vilhelm Snellman. The Kanawa newspaper was published in Vyborg between 1845 and 1847. It dealt with religious and state (political) issues. Snellmann, who was a prominent Fennoman philosopher, often translated articles from Hannikainen’s Kanawa and printed them in Saima. Kanawa was closed down by the authorities in 1847. Hannikainen later contributed to several newspapers, such as Suometar Uusi Suomi, of which he was the editor-in-chief until 1848.

His play Silmänkääntäjä, ie Jussi Oluvisen matka Hölmölään (The Conjurer, ie Jussi Oluvisen’s travel to Foolsville), the very first publicly presented play in Finnish language, was first performed in Lappeenranta in 1846 and then in Kuopio in 1847. Hannikainen already wrote the play end of 1830, when he was working as a surveyor's assistant in Hölmölä village in Ruokolahti. In total, Hannikainen wrote nine plays, four of which were unpublished. Hannikainen also wrote poems and translated numerous works including plays by authors such as Ludvig Holberg, William Shakespeare and Miguel de Cervantes. The words he forged or introduced into the general Finnish language are modern, guardian, publicity, profitability, gaze, accounting, accountant, craftsman, business, sales, council, name (verb), act (verb), pre-school, people’s school, learning school (see Education in Finland), share (noun), dividend, purchase, print, protocol, heroism, commit, conjugate (words), financial, commission (noun), wholesaler, future, import, photograph, vice judge (varatuomari), society, community and vowel.

== Works ==
- Silmänkääntäjä, the first publicly performed play in Finnish (performed in 1847). E-book from Gutenberg .
- Antonius Putronius, play adaptation. E-book from Gutenberg .
- Liukas-kielinen, comedy in five acts. E-book from Gutenberg .
- Pietar Patelin, satire in three acts. E-book from Gutenberg .
- Selima, a fairy-tale comedy in five acts. E-book from Gutenberg .
- Serkukset, short story (1848)
- Karjala G.W. Wilén: Descriptions of Finnish Provinces 3 (1864)
- Savonmaa G.W. Wilén: Descriptions of Finnish Provinces 2 (1864)
- Talvikukkasia, collected works (1865).
- Pitäjään-kirjasto, opiksi ja huviksi Suomen pereille (1869)
- Lapsuuden ystävät, comedy (1873)
- Neitsyt Siiri, play (1875)
- Jutelmia läheltä ja kaukaa 1. (1882). E-book from Gutenberg .
- Jutelmia läheltä ja kaukaa 2. (1884). E-book from Gutenberg .

== Translations ==
- Robert Trapp: Asianajajia eli lainopillinen käsikirja Suomen kansalle, Vyborg (1847)
- Alfred Nicolas Rambaud: Venäjän historia, vanhimmista ajoista alkaen vuoteen 1877; translated into Finnish by P. Hannikainen. Edlund, Helsinki (1880)
- Eugène Manuel: Työväen elämästä, play; translated into Finnish language by P. Hannikainen. Theatre literature 29. Telén, Kuopio 1899, 2nd edition (1908)

== Tributes ==
There is a road named Pietari Hannikainen Road in Pohjois-Haaga, in Helsinki.
