= Mary Wurm =

English pianist and composer

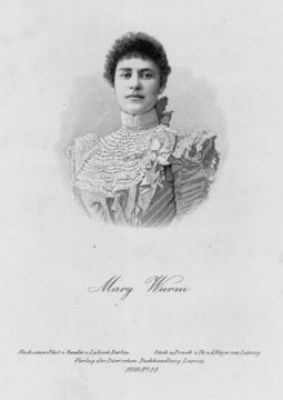
- Mary Wurm
- Born: Mary Josephine Agnes Würm; 18 May 1860; Southampton
- Died: 21 January 1938 (aged 77); Munich
- Occupation: Pianist
- Relatives: Adela Verne (sister); Alice Verne-Bredt (sister); Mathilde Verne (sister); John Vallier (nephew)

Mary J. A. Wurm (her surname was originally Würm) (18 May 1860 in Southampton – 21 January 1938 in Munich) was an English pianist, conductor, and composer.

== Life and career ==
Wurm was born as Mary Josephine Agnes Würm in England, the sister of Alice Verne-Bredt, Mathilde Verne, and Adela Verne. She lived in Stuttgart as a child, but later returned to London. She studied music in Frankfurt am Main at the Hoch Conservatory, where she joined Olga Radecki in the first composition class the Conservatory opened to women. Her teachers included Clara Schumann, Joachim Raff, Elisabeth Caland and Charles Villiers Stanford. Wurm became a noted pianist, and in 1898 founded and conducted a women's orchestra in Berlin. She wrote a piano school according to Caland's teachings. Her nephew was John Vallier.

In 1914, Verne published a Practical Preschool collection to be used as teaching material at Elisabeth Caland in Hannover.

== Works ==
Selected works include:

- Mag auch heiss das Scheiden brennen
- Christkindleins Wiegenlied aus des Knaben Wunderhorn (Text: Des Knaben Wunderhorn)
- Wiegenlied im Sommer (Text: Robert Reinick)
- Praktische Vorschule zur Caland-Lehre, Hannover 1914

== See also ==
- Mathilde Verne
- Musical Families (classical music)
