= Willman =

Willman is a surname. Notable people with the surname include:

- Allan Arthur Willman (1909–1989), American composer, classical pianist, music department chairman at the University of Wyoming
- Beth Willman (contemporary), American astronomer
- Bradley Willman (born 1980), Canadian anti-pedophile activist
- David Willman (born 1956), American Pulitzer prize-winning journalist
- Elvira Willman (1875–1925), Finnish playwright, journalist and a revolutionary socialist
- Hedvig Willman (1841–1887), Swedish stage actor and opera singer
- Max Willman (born 1995), American ice hockey player
- Noel Willman (1918–1988), British actor and theater director
- Regina Willman (1914-1965) American composer
- Tony Willman (1907–1941), American race car driver

== See also ==
- Willmann
- Wilman (name)
