= John Naylor (organist) =

Organist of York Minster (1838–1897)

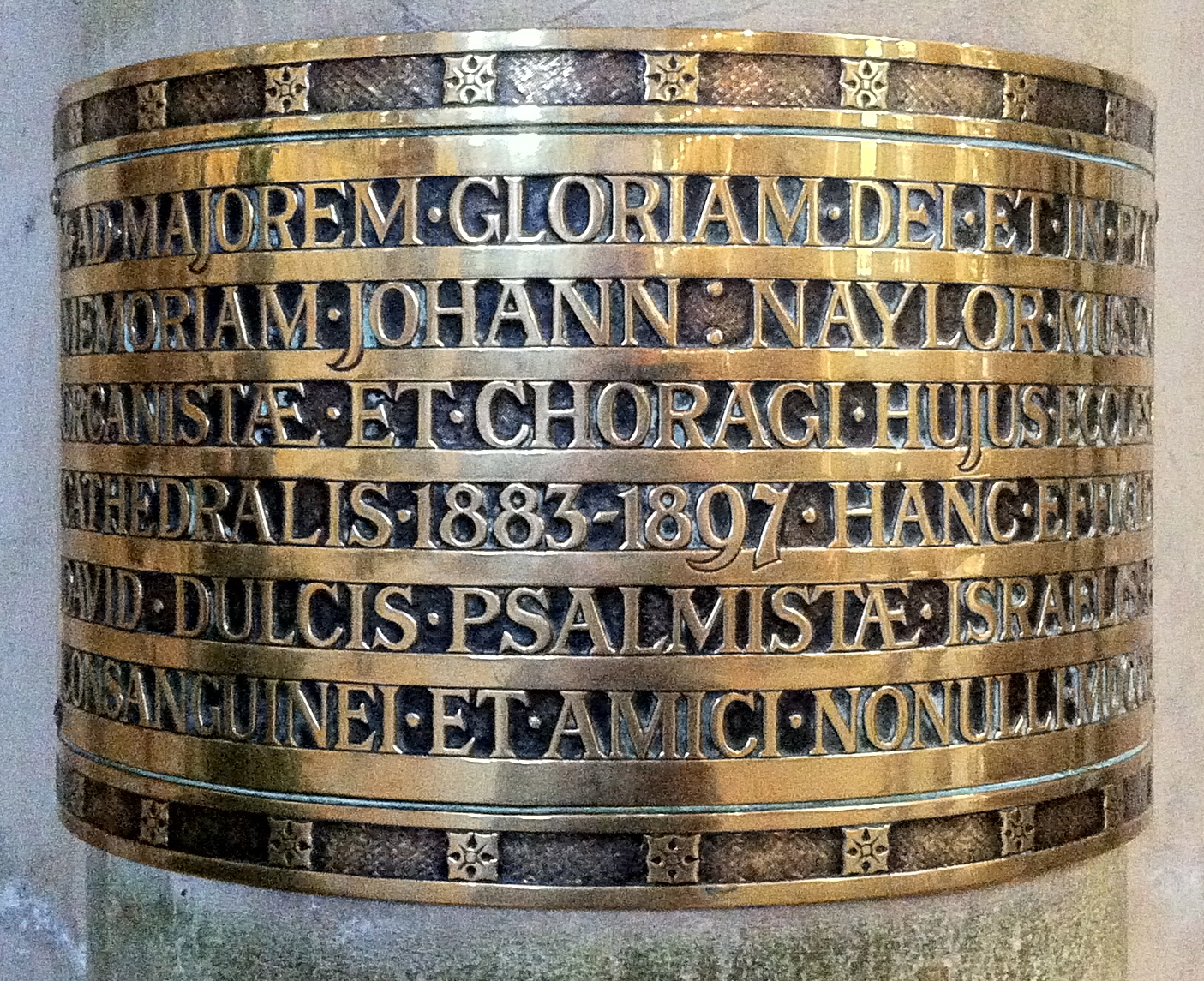
Memorial by George Frederick Bodley to John Naylor, Organist of York Minster. In the north transept of the minster.

John Naylor (8 June 1838 – 15 May 1897) was a composer and organist of York Minster from 1883 to 1897.

== Life ==
He was born in Stanningley, Leeds. His brother George Frederick Naylor was also an organist. He married Mary Ann Chatwin on 26 December 1865. The children from the marriage were:

- Edward Woodall Naylor (1867–1934) was also an organist and composer.
- Emily Naylor b. 1868
- Charles Legh Naylor (1869–1945). Organist of St. Peter's Church, Harrogate.
- Clara Naylor b. 1870
- Henry Darnley Naylor (1872–1945) was a classical scholar, who worked at the University of Melbourne, and the University of Adelaide

He died whilst on a voyage to Australia and was buried at sea, between Tenerife and the Cape, on 15 May 1897. A memorial was erected in York Minster on 29 June 1903, designed by George Frederick Bodley. The inscription reads:

Ad Majorem Gloriam Dei et in piam Memoriam Johann Naylor Mus. Doc, Orgaistae et Choragi Hujus Ecclesiae Cathedralis 1883-1897 Hanc effigiem David Dulcis Psalmistae Israelis P C Consanguinei et Amici Nonulli MDCCCCIII

== Career ==
He was a chorister at Leeds Parish Church and studied organ under Robert Senior Burton. He was deputy organist at Leeds Parish Church for a time. He later held two organist's posts in Scarborough. He was appointed organist of York Minster in 1883. He resigned from York Minster on 7 April 1897.

Whilst organist of York Minster he was also the conductor of the York Musical Society and taught several students, including composer Alexandra Thomson.

He was appointed an honorary member of the Royal Academy of Music in 1895.

== Appointments ==
- Organist at St Mary's Church, Scarborough 1856–1873
- Organist at All Saints' Church, Scarborough 1873–1883
- Organist at York Minster 1883–1897

== Compositions ==
Oratorios

- Jeremiah 1883
- In the Wilderness; or, The Soul's Life 1895
- The Brazen Serpent
- Meribah
- Manna

He also composed church services, anthems, part-songs, pieces for organ, and a book of chants.

Preceded by Edwin George Monk	Organist and Director of Music, York Minster; 1883 – 1897	Succeeded by T. Tertius Noble
