= Adela Verne =

English pianist (1877–1952)

- 1927 publicity photo

Background information
- Born: Adela Würm; February 27, 1877; Southampton, Hampshire, England
- Died: February 5, 1952 (aged 74)
- Instrument: piano

Adela Verne (27 February 1877 – 5 February 1952) was a distinguished English pianist of German descent, born in Southampton. She was considered the greatest woman pianist of her era, ranked alongside the male keyboard giants of the time. She toured with great success in many parts of the world. She composed a Military March dedicated to Queen Elizabeth, later the Queen Mother; her sister Mathilde's pupil.

== Life ==
She was born as Adela Würm (that was later anglicised to Verne) into a musical family named Würm. Three of her sisters (of her nine older siblings) were also notable pianists or composers: Mathilde and Alice both also adopted the surname Verne, but Mary returned to Germany, retained the family name Würm, and enjoyed great success as a pianist and composer.

Clara Schumann heard Adela play when she was a small girl. She was so impressed that she wanted to take her to Frankfurt for study, as she had done with Mathilde, however her parents would not permit this. Instead, she was taught by Mathilde and Alice, and later by Clara Schumann's daughter Marie Schumann. There is considerable confusion about the details of her tuition.

At age 13 she created a sensation when she played Tchaikovsky's Concerto No.1 in B♭ minor (then a relatively new work), conducted by Sir August Manns at the Crystal Palace. Tchaikovsky himself heard of this astonishing young prodigy and wanted to meet her. The following year she was introduced to Ignacy Jan Paderewski. He was so impressed with her playing that he predicted a great future for her. Later she became close friends with Paderewski, accepted as one of his family, and frequented his home in Morges in Switzerland. She worked on many pieces with him, including Chopin, as well as most of his own works, including the Sonata in E♭ minor, the Polish Fantasy and the Concerto in A minor, the work with which she made her orchestral debut in New York City.

== Musical career ==
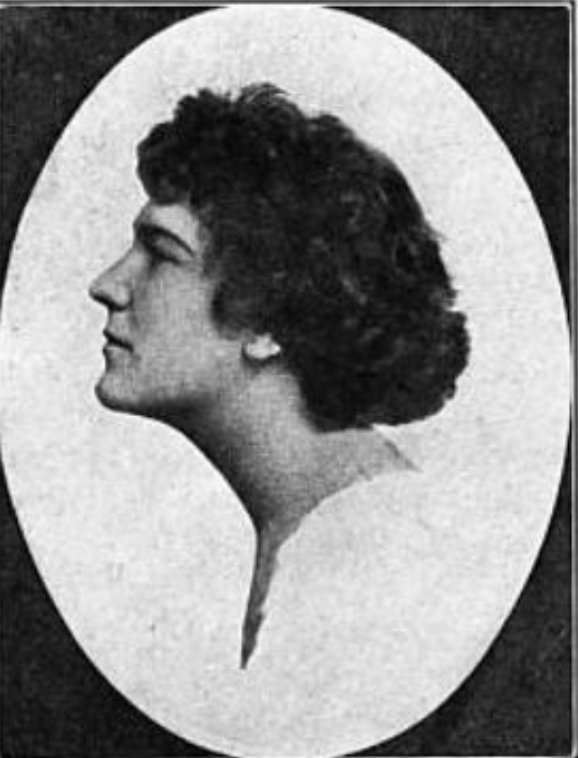
Verne in 1924

Adela Verne was hailed as the successor to Teresa Carreño. She was equally praised by North and South American, Australian, European and British audiences and critics as the greatest living woman pianist, ranked alongside the great male artists of the time. In Vienna, after hearing her play four concertos in one evening, Theodor Leschetizky gave her the rare honour of asking her to give a recital to his own pupils.

Her wide repertoire included a large amount from the 18th and 19th centuries, but also much from the 20th century, including works that were very modern for their day. She often appeared in chamber music recitals at the St James's Hall concerts, alongside artists such as the violinist Joseph Joachim and the cellist Alfredo Piatti.

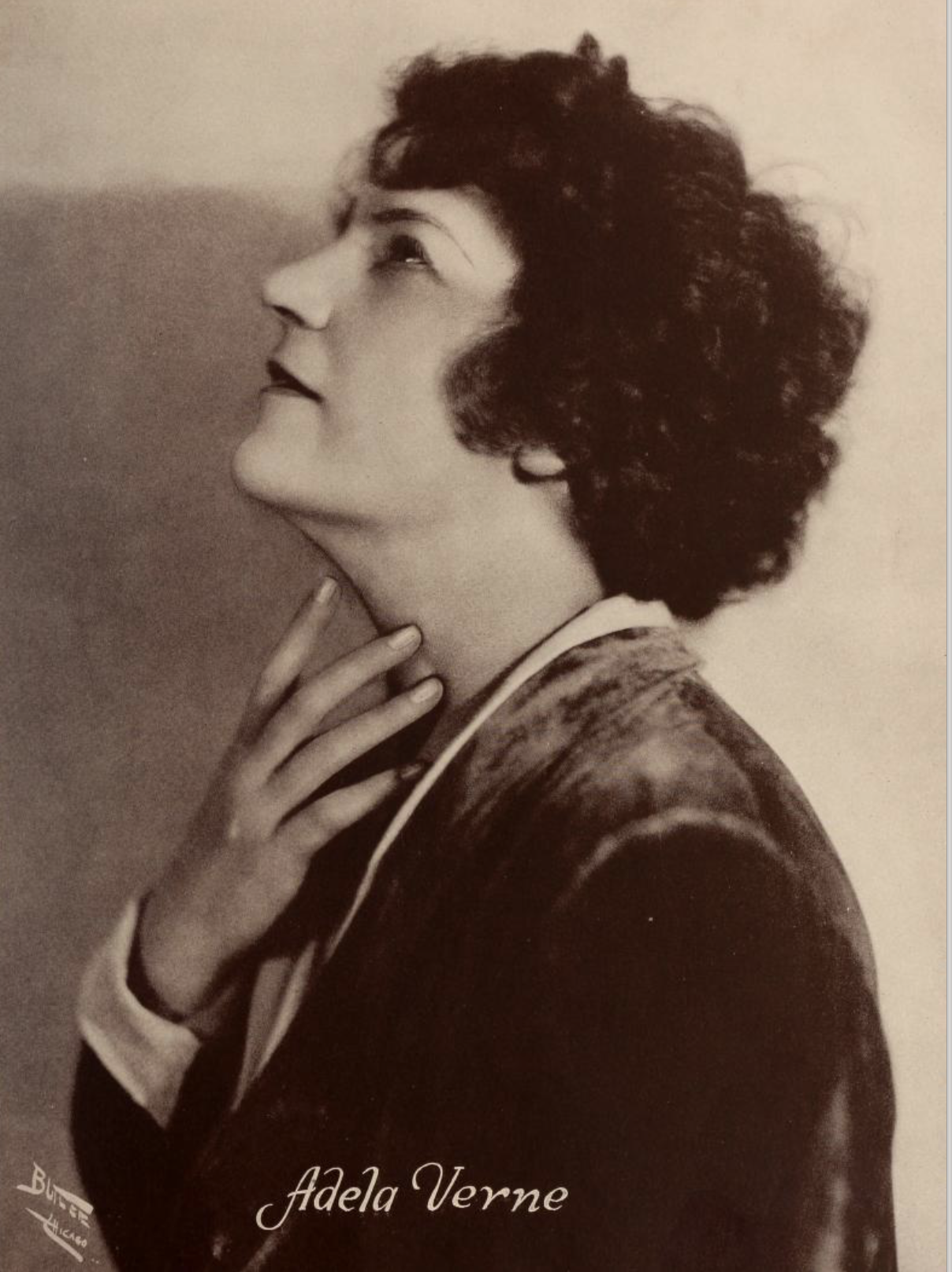
Verne in 1928

She toured Australia with Dame Nellie Melba, and was associated on stage with other singers such as Luisa Tetrazzini, Amelita Galli-Curci and John McCormack, and violinists such as Mischa Elman, Eugène Ysaÿe and others. She appeared regularly at the Proms, and was the first British artist to give a solo recital at the Royal Albert Hall.

Her premiere performances were many: she gave the first performance in Australia of Tchaikovsky's B♭ minor Piano Concerto (1898), the first performance in Australia of Saint-Saëns's G minor Piano Concerto (1898), the first performance in the United Kingdom of César Franck's Symphonic Variations, the first performance at the Prom Concerts of Brahms's B♭ Concerto (and the first woman to play this concerto at all in the UK), and the first television performance of Mozart's Concerto for 2 Pianos (given with her son John Vallier, also a famed concert pianist).

At the request of the BBC, in early 1952 she broadcast a special programme of works by Paderewski. Her last public appearance was at the special Jubilee Concerts celebrating the Wigmore Hall. She was preparing for her first recital at London's new Royal Festival Hall, when she died, on 5 February 1952, aged 74.

== Recorded legacy ==
Adela Verne's recorded legacy is small. There were two issued discs for English Columbia:

- L1212 - Ignacio Cervantes: Three Cuban Dances; Moritz Moszkowski: La Jongleuse (Recorded 1917, matrices 75981–1, 75983–1, available from Nov. 1917 to April 1921)
- L1213 - Frédéric Chopin: Polonaise in A flat, Op. 53 (Recorded 1917, matrices 75979–2, 75980–1, available from Dec. 1917 to May 1928)

The matrix numbers suggest an unissued recording was made on matrix 75982; she also recorded a number of piano rolls for Aeolian UK, around 1920/1.

- 03 - Cervantes: Three Cuban Dances
- 42 - Tchaikovsky: Meditation in D, Op. 72, No. 5
- 217 - Felix Mendelssohn: Prelude and Fugue in E minor, Op. 35, No. 1

== See also ==
- Alice Verne-Bredt
- Musical Families (classical music)
