= William Henry Hann =

English violist

William Henry Hann (30 May 1831– 20 October 1920) was an English viola player, and Musician in Ordinary to the Queen. He was the head of a musical family from Brixton who often performed chamber music together in the 1890s.

Hann was a member of the Philharmonic Society Orchestra, and for many years was in the band of the Three Choirs Festival. He was also associated with John Ella, founder of The Musical Union. Hann was a regular player at the Monday Popular Concerts series at St James's Hall, and played in the first centenary Handel Festival held at Crystal Palace in 1859.

In 1860 he married Sophie Hopkins (1835– died before 1912), a member of another extensive English musical family. In 1875 he was appointed principal viola in Queen Victoria's Private Band, performing in all state concerts at Buckingham Palace and Windsor Castle, using the Royal Amati viola. In 1895 he succeeded C.W. Doyle as principal viola in the Leeds Festival Orchestra.

Hann died, aged 90, at his home, 79 Fentiman Rd in Lambeth.

== Musical family ==
From 1886 he instigated a series of chamber concerts at Brixton Hall, South London, featuring his musical sons. These were held annually for the next ten years. Sydney Hann was typically the pianist at these events, but sometimes he would switch to the viola so that a single family sextet could plays works by Dvorak and Brahms. (The Grimson family went two better than this when eight family members performed Mendelssohn's Octet in 1896 at Queen's Hall). A (non-family) guest vocalist was sometimes featured in the concerts.

His musical sons (and later a daughter) were:

- Edward Hopkins Hann (1861–1929), violin, founding member of London Symphony Orchestra
- William Charles Hann (1863–1926), cellist, pupil of Carlo Alfredo Piatti, Philharmonic Society Orchestra
- Lewis Robert Hann (1865–1937), violinist, composer, music professor at Cheltenham Ladies College, leader of the Cheltenham Philharmonic Society
- Sydney Herbert Hann (1867–1921), organist, pianist, hymn tune composer, teacher. He was organist at St Mary's Church, Islington (1888-1907) and Brixton Independent Church (1907-1921)
- Clement Walter Hann (1870–1921), cellist, 2nd violin, Philharmonic Orchestra, chorister at the Chapel Royal
- Marianne Sophia Hann (1878–1926), mezzo soprano, teacher
