= John Vallier =

English musician (1920–1991)

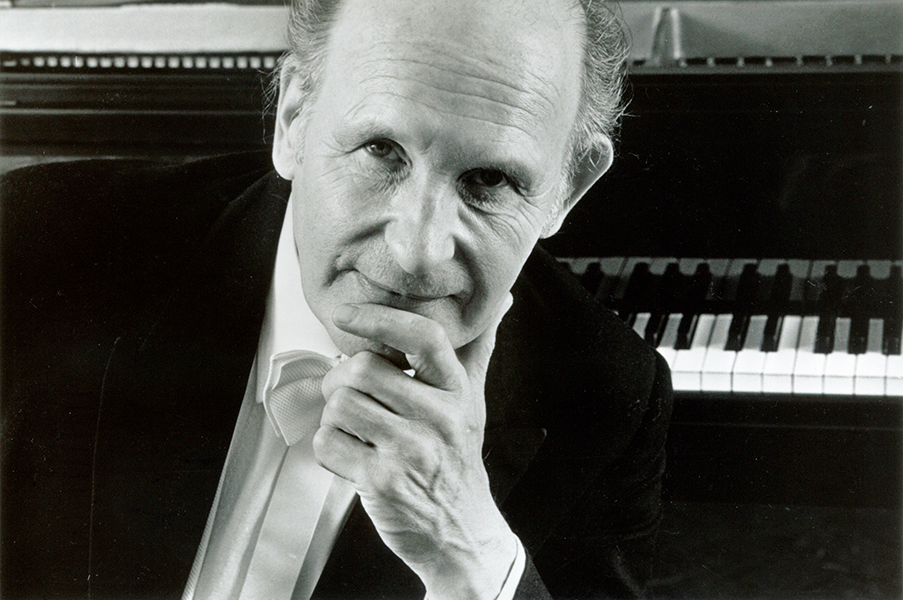
- Born: 1 October 1920; London, England
- Died: 11 June 1991 (aged 70)
- Occupation: Concert Pianist
- Known for: Authenticity in interpretation, especially Chopin & Schumann
- Parents: Mother: Adela Verne; Father: Jean Vallier
- Relatives: Mathilde Verne (aunt), Alice Verne-Bredt (aunt), Mary Wurm (aunt)

John Vallier (1 October 1920 – 11 June 1991) was an English classical pianist and composer who was known for his thunderous technique and beautiful singing tone, and was especially admired for his interpretations and performances of Chopin and Schumann. He could trace his musical ancestry in an eminently distinguished line back to the Romantic Era of the 19th century. He was born in 1920 and was only four years old when he appeared in public for the first time, at London's Wigmore Hall. His last solo recital at London's Royal Festival Hall was attended by HM The Queen Mother.

== Musical education ==
Vallier's mother was the pianist Adela Verne, the finest woman pianist of her time and herself a contemporary and even rival of Paderewski, whose teacher Leschetizky was a pupil of Czerny who taught Liszt. Vallier's aunt and principal teacher was Mathilde Verne, through whose famous piano school in London passed the young Vallier as well as the pianists Solomon and Moura Lympany, and even socialite Lady Elizabeth Bowes-Lyon (later Queen Elizabeth The Queen Mother). Mathilde Verne was herself the finest pupil of Clara Schumann, from whom she inherited a direct insight into her husband Robert Schumann's music and their friends and colleagues Mendelssohn, Chopin and Brahms. Vallier's father was Jean Vallier, a distinguished operatic Bass. Vallier was immersed from his first years in the purest traditions of piano playing embellished with authenticity of interpretation.

Vallier gave his first solo concert at the age of eight, and was something of a child prodigy giving recitals in the South of France. He was heard by Moritz Rosenthal (Liszt's pupil) whom he much impressed. However his Aunt held back developing the young talent too early. Vallier was sent to study in Vienna for three years with Walter Kerschbaumer, a pupil of Busoni. Alfred Cortot proclaimed him a brilliant musician; later he worked with Edwin Fischer.

== Early career ==
He returned from Vienna in 1939 and was about to embark on a tour of the US but the War intervened. Much to the chagrin of his parents and aunt, Vallier served directly in the war years and was a crack shot with a rifle. He was demobilised with the rank of Captain.

He resumed his performing career and concertized extensively. There were some notable recitals in London and the UK and some in Europe. With his mother on the BBC he gave the first televised performance of Mozart's Piano Concerto for Two Pianos, and the first performance in the UK of Dohnányi’s Second Piano Concerto with the Liverpool Philharmonic Orchestra. He was one of the last who would improvise the cadenza to a concerto, particularly Beethoven, and, as an encore, would invite the name of a composer and tune from the audience and then improvise a piece in the style of the composer suggested. He also undertook valuable educational work in bringing classical music to children in parts of the country where live performances were rare in the 1940s and early 1950s at schools for the WEA. His amiable personality helped immeasurably in this task. However his career did not take off in the way his pre-war years had predicted.

== Musicology ==
He turned to teaching and musicological research. He taught in London, at the London College of Music. Over many years he became an international authority on Chopin. He was a lifelong friend of Chopin expert Arthur Hedley and gave several first performances of then recently discovered Chopin works. These and some of Vallier’s detailed writings appeared in his Oxford University Press Chopin Edition (1986).

== Later career ==
Vallier returned to concertizing at the end of the 1970s with immense success. The start of his South Bank Concert with the Paderewski Piano Sonata in E Flat Minor was delayed by 20 minutes because of box-office queues. He followed in his mother’s footsteps with touring successes particularly in Latin-America. He was acclaimed internationally for his virtuosity and stylistic insight. A Chopin Recital at New York’s Carnegie Hall in 1983 was particularly well received, and Vallier was to return to tour the States the next year.

== Illness and death ==
Vallier returned to CBS Studios in London for recordings, but noticed something wrong with his breathing. He was diagnosed with lung cancer. In 1984 he had a lung removed resulting in a 22” scar on his back, and subsequently also contracted pleuritic influenza, prostatitis and shingles. He was thereafter on painkillers, taking 3,000 pills a year. Despite all odds, he returned again to the concert platform, in a solo recital in 1986 at London's Royal Festival Hall, attended by HM The Queen Mother. Although cleared for five years of the cancer, a second primary (a rarity) occurred in his other lung. Vallier died in June 1991, aged 71.

== Composer ==
Vallier's output was modest as a composer, and primarily his works were miniatures for the piano. His Toccatina won especial popularity and was first recorded by Benno Moiseiwitsch and later by Marc-André Hamelin (2001). Witches’ Ride (depicting the Witches of Zennor, Cornwall) was also popular and often featured in his own encores. However his last work was a large-scale, his Piano Concerto in A Minor, a commission from the Royal Philharmonic Orchestra. He completed it two days before he died.
