= St Peter's Church, Harrogate =

Church in Harrogate, North Yorkshire, England

Coordinates: 53°59′36″N 01°32′26″W

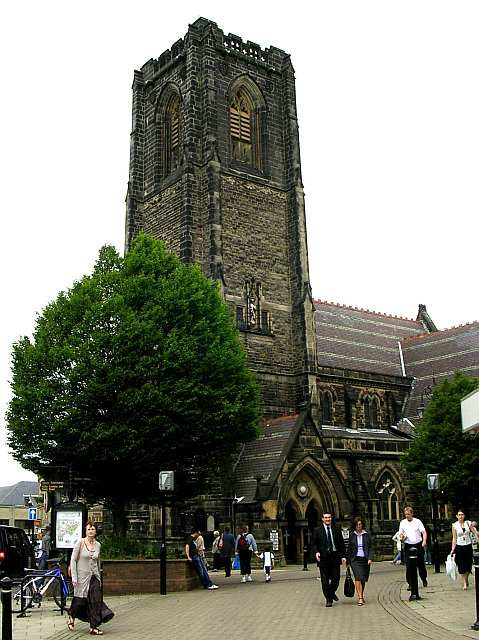
- St Peter's Church, Harrogate

- Location within North Yorkshire
- OS grid reference: SE 30195 55345
- Denomination: Church of England
- Churchmanship: Evangelical
- Website: www.stpetersharrogate.org.uk

History
- Dedication: St Peter

Administration
- Province: Province of York
- Diocese: Diocese of Leeds
- Parish: Harrogate

Clergy
- Vicar: The Revd Alan Garrow

St Peter's Church, Harrogate is a parish church in the Church of England located in Harrogate, North Yorkshire, England. It is a Grade II listed building.

== History ==
The church was formed out of the parish of Christ Church, High Harrogate.

A subscription for the erection of the church was commenced and the foundation stone was laid in April, 1870. The church is of the decorated style of architecture, from a design by Mr. Hirst, of Bristol, and consists of a nave of five bays, 70 feet in length by 27 feet in breadth, with north and south aisles, each 15 feet 9 inches wide; the last bay at the eastern end of the aisle on each side projects outwards to double its former breadth, in the form of a transept, which is gabled outwardly; the chancel will be about 35 feet in length by 22 feet in breadth, terminating in a circular apse, the interior of which will be arcaded. A tower, bearing a spire, is situate at the west end of the south aisle. The living is a curacy or vicarage, the income of which is £100 a year, paid by the Ecclesiastical Commissioners. The first incumbent – the Rev. L. F. W. Foote – appointed in 1870.

The chancel, with a temporary nave, was consecrated on Sunday 10 September 1871 by Reverend Bishop Ryan, vicar of Bradford.

== List of Vicars ==
- Lundy Edward William Foote 1870 – 1922
- John Manstead Cunningham 1922 – 1937
- Gascoigne Cecil Clare 1937 – 1947 (formerly vicar of St Edmund's, Roundhay, Leeds)
- Roger Holford Baines 1947 – 1967
- Andrew Neville Burn Sugden 1967 – 1987
- Anthony Michael Shepherd 1987 – 2015
- Alan Garrow 2016–present

== Organ ==
The church has a pipe organ which has evolved over a long period of time from an original organ by Edmund Schulze in 1867. This was moved to St Bartholomew's Church, Armley and a smaller organ installed in 1869. There have been restorations by Brindley & Foster, Abbott & Smith, Binns, J. W. Walker & Sons Ltd, and Prested.

A specification of the organ can be found on the National Pipe Organ Register.

=== List of organists ===
- Miss Knowles
- Alfred Robinson
- Mr. Paley
- John Septimus Dickinson 1870 – ???? (formerly organist of Christ Church, High Harrogate)
- John Shaw 1879 – 1890
- Robert Senior Burton 1890 – 1892 (formerly organist of Leeds Parish Church)
- Charles Legh Naylor 1892 – 1902
- John Pullein 1903 – 1917 (formerly assistant at Lincoln Cathedral, latterly organist of St Mary's Cathedral, Glasgow)
- Charles Legh Naylor 1917 – 1935 (appointed again)
- Jack Spencer 1935 – 1970 (previously organist of St Stephen's Church, Kirkstall, Leeds)
- J Harry Hodgson 1970 – 1976
- Adrian Selway 1976 – 1981
- Ian Linford 1980 – 1984
- Ralph S Franklin 1984 – 1987
- Hugh Shelton 1987 – 1988
- Nigel Holdsworth 1988 – 1993
- Philip Wilby 1993 – 1997
- Richard Hunt 1997 – 2003
- Oliver Longstaff 2003 – 2012
- John Longstaff 2012 – present

== Bells ==
St Peter's has a fine ring of eight bells in the tower which were cast by John Taylor of Loughborough. They achieved a certain notoriety when they became the first tower in the United Kingdom to have an injunction made on the bells for an offence of noise pollution.

== See also ==
- Listed buildings in Harrogate (Low Harrogate Ward)
