= Jacopo Puccini =

Italian composer (1712–1781)

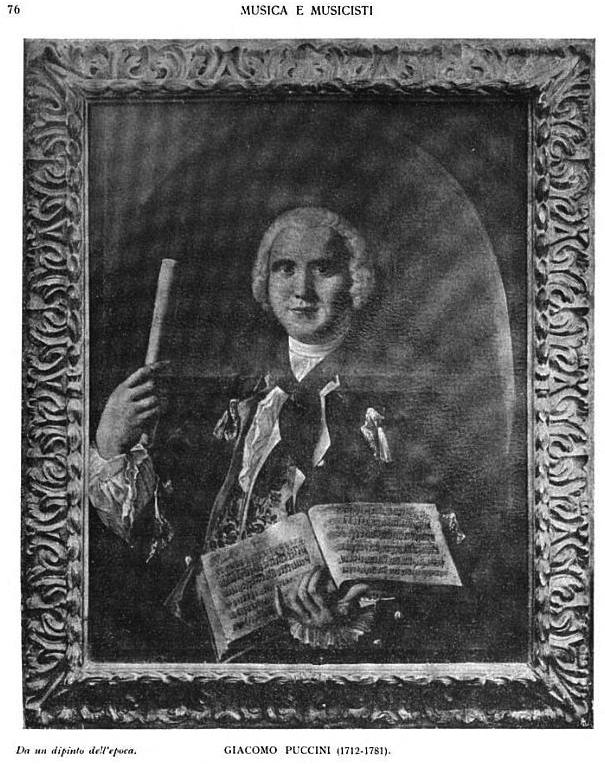
Jacopo Puccini

Jacopo (or Giacomo) Puccini (Italian: [ˈjaːkopo putˈtʃiːni]; 26 January 1712 – 16 May 1781) was an 18th-century Italian composer who lived and worked primarily in Lucca, Republic of Lucca. He was the first of five generations of composers, the most famous of whom was his great-great-grandson, the opera composer Giacomo Puccini.

== Career ==
Puccini studied in Bologna under Giuseppe Carretti, who was maestro di cappella at Bologna's San Petronio Basilica. In Bologna Puccini became friends with Padre Martini. After returning to Lucca in 1739, he served as organist in the cathedral and later Maestro di Cappella to the Most Serene Republic. Puccini belonged to the Accademia Filarmonica of Bologna and was a skilled teacher.

His musical style incorporated elements of both the Baroque and early Classic periods. Puccini was known as an excellent organist. He wrote many dramatic and sacred works, including a Te Deum for four voices and instruments, a Domine for four voices, masses, and psalm settings. Between 1733 and 1780, Puccini wrote 31 servizi ecclesiastici for the annual Feast of the Exaltation of the Holy Cross (Festa della Esaltazione della Santa Croce). Some of Puccini's works, including a processional motet in eight voices, continued to be performed into at least the early 19th Century. A Requiem for eight voices by Puccini was performed at the Vienna Musical Exposition of 1892, together with music by his son Antonio, grandson Domenico, and great-grandson Michele. He was the teacher of opera composer Pietro Alessandro Guglielmi.

== Compositions ==
- Messa a 3 (1760). Consists of Kyrie, Gloria, and Credo. Scored for 2 violins in unison, cello, bass, continuo, and three-part chorus (SSA or SAA). Original title: 1760/ Messa Piena a 3 voci, cioè Canto, e due Alti/ Con violini a beneplacito Unis: [soni]/ Per il Concerto di S. Giovannetto/ di Giacomo Puccini.
- Messa di requiem (1760). Requiem mass for 8 voices, strings, and continuo.

== The Puccini musical dynasty ==
Five generations of the Puccini family were composers in Lucca.

- Jacopo Puccini ("Giacomo Puccini senior"): 26 January 1712 – 16 May 1781.
- Antonio Benedetto Maria Puccini: 30 July 1747 – 10 February 1832.
- Domenico Vincenzo Maria Puccini: 5 April 1772 – 25 May 1815.
- Michele Puccini: 27 November 1813 – 23 Jan 1864.
- Giacomo Puccini: 22 December 1858 – 29 November 1924.

== Recordings ==
- Giacomo Puccini, Sr.: Musica Sacra. Available: cduniverse amazon
- Messa di Requiem. Available: guardian
- I Puccini musicisti di Lucca, Vol. I & Vol. 2. Available http://www.cappellasantacecilia.it/cd_prodotti.htm
