= Domenico Puccini =

Italian composer (1772–1815)

Domenico Vincenzo Maria Puccini (5 April 1772 – 25 May 1815) was an Italian composer, a contemporary of Muzio Clementi, Johann Nepomuk Hummel, Franz Schubert and Ludwig van Beethoven.

Puccini was born in Lucca into a Tuscan musical family of at least five generations: his father was Antonio Puccini, his grandfather was Giacomo Puccini (senior), his son was Michele Puccini, and his grandson was the opera composer Giacomo Puccini.

His works include a piano concerto in B and several dozen piano sonatas.

Puccini died in Lucca in 1815.
