= Bernard Naylor =

English Canadian composer, conductor, organist (1907-1986)

- Born: Bernard James Naylor; November 22, 1907; Cambridge, England
- Died: May 19, 1986 (aged 78); Bassenthwaite, Cumbria, England
- Spouse: Dorothy Crerar (m. 1940)

Bernard Naylor (November 22, 1907 – May 19, 1986) was an English and Canadian composer, conductor and organist.

== Early life ==
Bernard James Naylor was born in Cambridge, England, on November 22, 1907. His father, Edward Naylor, was an English composer.

== Career ==
In 1930, he received a Bachelor of Music from the University of Oxford. In the 1920s, he visited Canada and studied with Gustav Holst, John Ireland and Vaughan Williams at The Royal Conservatory of Music. He became an organ scholar at Exeter College during the late 1920s and early 1930s. In the 1930s, he moved to Winnipeg and worked as a conductor with choirs and orchestras in the city, as well as being the organist-choirmaster at Holy Trinity Anglican Church. During the late 1930s, he traveled back to England to be an organist and musical director at Queens' College, but returned to Canada shortly after in 1940, where he married Dorothy Crerar. He founded the Little Symphony of Montreal in 1942 and composed in Montreal for five years. After singing in the Winnipeg Philharmonic Choir for a year, in the 1950s he again returned to England. He taught at both at the University of Oxford and the University of Reading. He returned to Canada in 1959 and spent the rest of his life there with his wife, continuing to compose, first in Winnipeg and then in Victoria in 1968, despite retiring officially in 1964. In 1980, he received honorary doctorates of law from both the University of Winnipeg and the University of Manitoba. He and his wife, donated art to the Winnipeg Art Gallery.

== Death ==
On May 19, 1986, Naylor died in his sleep in Bassenthwaite, Cumbria while visiting friends in England.

His documents were later collected by the University of Victoria. His status as an associate composer is maintained by the Canadian Music Centre.
