= George Frederick Naylor =

Composer and organist in England and New Zealand

George Frederick Naylor (16 October 1851 - 1920) was a composer and organist in England and New Zealand.

He was born into a famous musical family in Leeds. His father was James Naylor and his mother Mary Ann Sowden. He was educated at Carlisle Grammar School from 1860 to 1865 and as a chorister in the choir of Carlisle Cathedral, where his father was a Lay Clerk. His brother John was organist of York Minster.

After a series of organists positions in the UK, George and his wife Annie moved to New Zealand where he was appointed as organist of Nelson Cathedral in 1898 and then Napier Cathedral in 1903.

He died in Hawkes Bay, New Zealand in 1920.

== Compositions ==
- Grand March in A for Organ. Published by Hammond, London 1890.
- 'O Thou, most loving Father', Anthem 1918

== Appointments ==
- Salem Chapel, Bradford 1871 -
- St Mark's Church, Manningham ???? – 1882
- St Peter's Church, Bramley 1882 – 1892
- St Chad's Church, Far Headingley 1892 - 1894
- Trinity Methodist Church, Harrogate 1894 – 1897
- Christ Church Cathedral, Nelson 1897 - 1903
- Waiapu Cathedral of Saint John the Evangelist, Napier 1903 - 1912
