= Mathilde Verne =

English pianist (1865–1936)

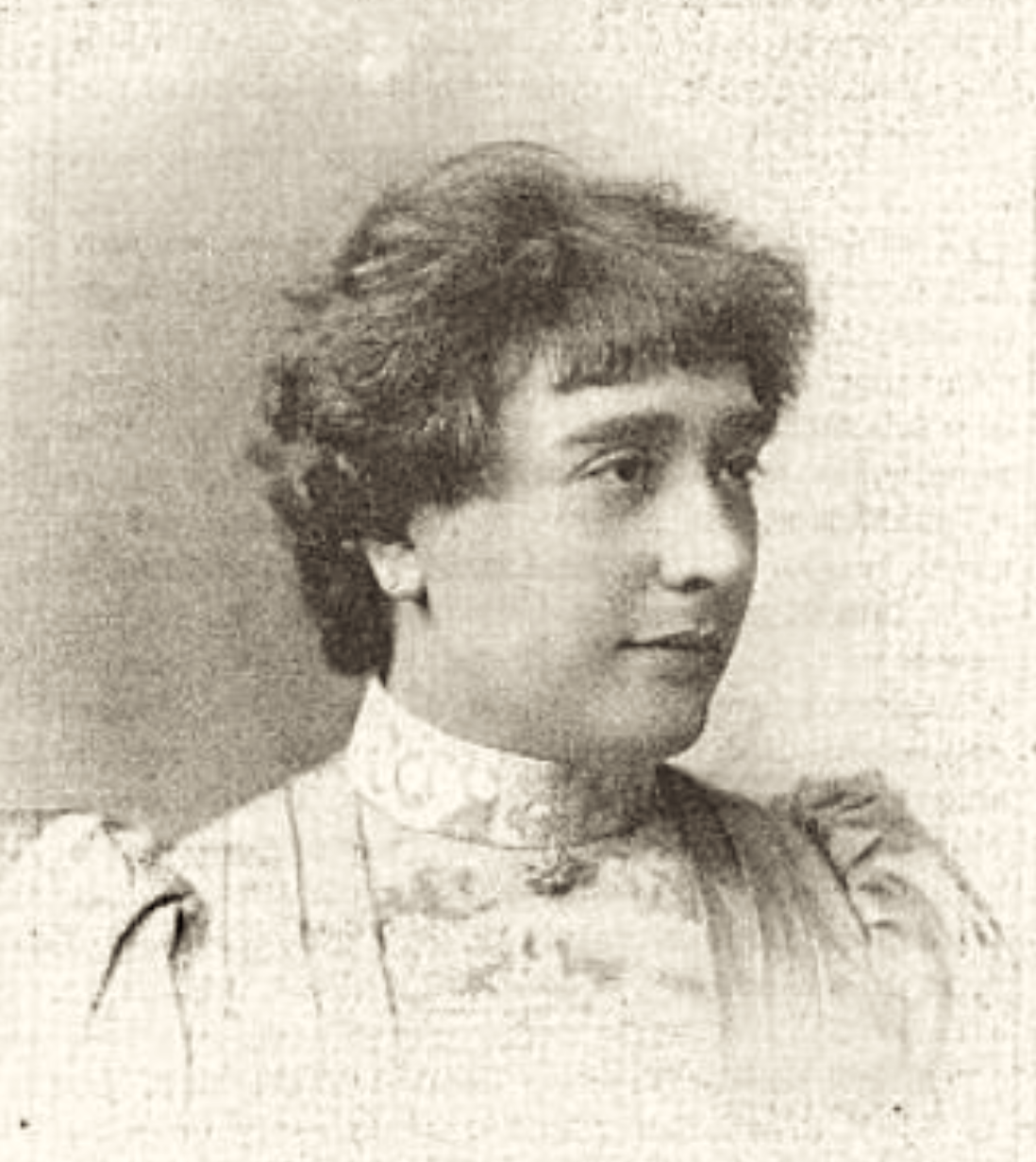
1890 photograph of Mathilde Verne (then known as Mathilde Wurm).

Mathilde Verne (née Wurm; 25 May 1865 – 4 June 1936) was an English pianist and teacher, of German descent. Along with most of her other sisters, Mathilde changed her surname to Verne in 1893 after the death of their father, John Wurm.

== Life and career ==
She was born as Mathilde Wurm in Southampton, England, the fourth of ten children. After studying for four years under Clara Schumann in Frankfurt, she became established as a concert pianist in 1887, as well as launching a career as music teacher. She taught briefly at the Royal College of Music, and later made regular appearances under Henry Wood at the Queen's Hall Promenade Concerts, being strongly associated with the "Tuesday 12 O'Clock Concerts" of chamber music, from 1907 until her death in 1936. Her sisters were Adela Verne, Alice Verne-Bredt and Mary Wurm.

She made her debut in St James's Hall in London, playing a Mendelssohn piano trio. She frequently appeared as soloist under such conductors as Arthur Nikisch, Hans Richter, Sir August Manns, and Sir Henry J. Wood. She twice visited the United States, playing under Theodore Thomas. She became especially famous for her authentic playing of the works of Robert Schumann. Her pupils, aside from her sister, Adela, and her nephew, John Vallier, included Solomon; Dame Moura Lympany, Harold Samuel, Herbert Menges and Joan Mary Last. She also taught Elizabeth Bowes-Lyon (the future Queen Elizabeth The Queen Mother), who became patron of her school.

She died in 1936 at 85 in London, surrounded by musician friends, at a party at the Savoy to launch her book ' Chords of Remembrance.

== See also ==
- Alice Verne-Bredt
- Mary Wurm
- Musical Families (classical music)
