= Charles Legh Naylor =

British composer

- Born: 14 October 1869
- Origin: England
- Died: 22 November 1945 (aged 76)
- Genres: Classical
- Occupation(s): Composer, organist
- Instrument: Pipe organ
- Spouse: Ada Emily Binns (m. 1905)

Charles Legh Naylor (14 October 1869 – 22 November 1945) was a composer and organist based in Harrogate.

== Life ==
He was the son of John Naylor and Mary Ann Chatwin. His father was organist of York Minster from 1883 to 1897.

He was educated at St Peter's School, York and later he was awarded a first class degree in music from Emmanuel College, Cambridge in 1890.

He married Ada Emily Binns in Scarborough in 1902, and they had one daughter, Carolina Mary Naylor, in 1905.

== Appointments ==
- Organist at Emmanuel College, Cambridge 1889–1892
- Deputy organist at York Minster 1891–1892
- Organist at St. Peter's Church, Harrogate 1892–1902
- Conductor of the Kursaal Orchestra, Harrogate 1902–1911
- Organist of All Souls, Blackman Lane, Leeds 1911–1917
- Organist at St. Peter's Church, Harrogate 1917–1935

== Compositions ==
He was the musical advisor to the Methodist School Hymnal and composed 50 tunes for it. He also composed:

- psalm chants
- Communion Service in D 1883
- O Perfect Love 1889
- Where sunless Rivers weep 1892
- Lead Kindly Light 1895
- God that Madest Earth and Heaven 1896
- Through the Day thy love has spared us 1898
- Ye Mariners of England. 1900
- We sing a song of Christmas-time 1909
- Will God in Very Deed dwell with men 1926
