= Tony Hewitt-Jones =

English composer and music organizer

David Anthony Hewitt Jones (27 January 1926 - 4 October 1989), known as Tony, was a composer, conductor, organist and music organizer most active in Gloucestershire.

== Early career ==
Born in Ealing, Tony Hewitt Jones won scholarships to Westminster School and to Christ Church, Oxford, where his studies were interrupted by war service in the Royal Navy. Returning to Oxford, he studied under the organist and composer Bernard Rose. In 1954 he moved to Cheltenham, where he taught for several years at Dean Close School before being appointed Assistant County Music Adviser in 1958 and then County Music Organiser for Gloucestershire in 1963. He conducted choirs and orchestras in the County, and was the first conductor of the Gloucestershire Youth Orchestra, founded in 1956. In 1957, after further study with Herbert Sumsion, he was made an ARCO and awarded the Limpus and Read prizes by the Royal College of Organists.

== Composition ==
Hewitt-Jones began composing in 1951. From the late 1950s his works were often commissions for performance at notable local occasions, such as the Three Choirs Festival of 1962 (where his Te Deum was performed), fanfares for the opening of the Severn Bridge by the Queen on 8 September 1966, and the Stroud Festival in 1970, for which his six movement cantata Rembrandt was commissioned. Rembrandt is one of six dramatic cantatas with texts by the Cheltenham poet and librettist Anthony Richards, including The Play King, (Shropshire Schools Festival, 1968), The Battle of Tewkesbury (1971), and Edmund King and Martyr, which was performed at Framlingham with Peter Pears as soloist in 1974.

Among his other more substantial pieces are the song cycle Seven Sea Poems for baritone, chorus and strings (fp. Oxford, 1956), the Sinfonietta for Strings (1959), the Theme and Variations for Wind Quintet (1966), the Clarinet Concerto (1968), the choral Cheltenham Scenes (fp. Lincoln Cathedral, 1973), and the Sonata for Organ (Missa brevis) from 1977. Many of these show a tougher, more modernistic aspect of his style, as in the Five Pieces for Orchestra, composed in 1963 and revived by the Gloucestershire Symphony Orchestra in 2023. But there are also many smaller pieces among his catalogue of 200 works in a lighter style for choirs, solo voice, organ or for various chamber ensembles, aimed at more practical music making by amateurs as well as professionals and church musicians.

The Trumpet Concerto, premiered by the Cheltenham Chamber Orchestra in 1986, was his last major work. It has been recorded by John Wallace with the BBC Scottish Symphony Orchestra. After that came the final choral anthem, Out of the Deep, which was performed at his funeral in October 1989.

== Family ==
His wife Anita (born 1926, maiden name Lawson) was a cellist and composer, who published mostly educational compositions and arrangements, particularly for cello and string ensemble, under her married name Anita Hewitt-Jones. They met in Oxford and married in July, 1950. She died in 2007, aged 80. His sister Jenny Hewitt-Jones was a violinist with the Liverpool Philharmonic Orchestra, and a teacher in Liverpool for over 30 years. She died, aged 95, in 2025. Jenny's daughter Penny was a cellist (married to the Anglican bishop Paul Ferguson), who pre-deceased her mother in 2022. Anita's son (and Jenny's nephew) is Tim Hewitt-Jones, a cellist who studied at the Royal Academy of Music and played with the London Symphony Orchestra before joining the Orchestra of the Royal Opera House. His wife Gill is a string teacher. Their children include the composer Thomas Hewitt Jones and the violinist Simon Hewitt Jones.

Hewitt-Jones died in October 1989, aged 63, after contracting bone cancer.

== Selected works ==
- At the round earth’s imagin’d corners, choral (1955)
- Seven Sea Poems, soloist, chorus and orchestra (1956)
- Sinfonietta for Strings (1959)
- Te Deum (Gloucester, 1961)
- Five Pieces for Orchestra (1963)
- Good Company, cantata for baritone, chorus and orchestra (Derby Choral Society, 1964)
- Mass of the Reconciliation, choral (1965)
- Fanfares for the Opening of the Severn Bridge (1966)
- Obee Concerto (1966)
- Theme and Variations for Wind Quintet (1966)
- The Divine Image, choral (1967)
- Two Canticles, choral (Farnham Festival, 1967)
- Clarinet Concerto (1968)
- The Play King, choral (Shropshire Schools Festival, 1968)
- Suite for solo cello (1969)
- Trio, for clarinet, viola and piano (Stadler Trio, 1969)
- Rembrandt, choral (1970)
- The Battle of Tewkesbury, choral cantata (1971)
- Cheltenham Scenes, choral (fp. Lincoln Cathedral, 1973)
- Edmund, King and Martyr, choral cantata (Bury St Edmunds, 1974)
- Return from a Far Country, choral (1976)
- The Celestial City (Bristol Bach Choir, 1977)
- Music for Joyful Occasions, organ (1978-82)
- The Gloucester Service (1981)
- Piano Trio (Joubert Trio, 1985)
- Benedicite, choral (Three Choirs Festival, 1986)
- Trumpet Concerto (1986)
- Out of the Deep, choral (1989)
