= Magdalena Willmann =

German soprano

Johanna Magdalena Willmann (13 September 1771 – 23 December 1801) was a German soprano, one of a family of musicians. She appeared in Bonn and at the court opera in Vienna.

== Life ==
Willmann's father, Johann Ignaz Willmann (1739–1815) was a musician, playing flute, violin and cello. Magdalena and her siblings Maximilian and Walburga were born in Bonn between 1767 and 1771; her half-sister Caroline, daughter of Ignaz and his second wife Marianne de Tribolet, was born in 1796.

Ignaz became in 1767 a member of the chamber orchestra of the Elector of Cologne in Bonn. The family moved to Vienna in the 1770s, and Ignaz joined the Tonkünstler-Sozietät. In 1784 he arranged a concert in which Magdalena and her siblings Maximilian and Walburga gave their Viennese concert debut.

She studied singing with Vincenzo Righini in Vienna, and made her first appearance on the stage in December 1786, in Ignaz Umlauf's Der Ring der Liebe. She came to Bonn in 1788. In the summer of 1790, Luísa Todi sang in Bonn; Alexander Wheelock Thayer wrote: "Magdelena's quick apprehension caught her style, and a few months later she surprised her audience with a grand aria perfectly in the great Italian manner." It is thought that Ludwig van Beethoven met her around this time, and became more attached to her during the trip in 1791 of Bonn musicians to Mergentheim.

In the summer of 1791 she made a concert tour with her family, visiting Mainz, Frankfurt, Darmstadt, Mannheim, Munich and other towns. At Dischingen, the summer residence of the Prince of Thurn and Taxis, she took the part of Belmonte in Mozart's Die Entführung aus dem Serail, other parts being taken by the Princess, the Duchess of Hildburghausen and others of the aristocracy. In July 1793, the Willmann family left Bonn for Italy, and Peter Winter engaged her for the opera which he composed for the carnival at Venice in 1794. In 1795 Magdelena made a tour through Germany.

Returning to Vienna in that year, she was engaged at the Imperial opera. She married in 1799 A. Galvani, a Trieste merchant, and she remained in the Vienna opera until her premature death in 1801.

Thayer wrote: "She was very beautiful in person, and upon her return to Vienna, Beethoven renewed his acquaintance with her and (on the testimony of her niece) offered her his hand. Her voice was of phenomenal extent, ranging from high soprano to contralto." He quoted Ernst Ludwig Gerber: "She belongs to the most celebrated German singers, renowned for her wonderfully deep and at the same time remarkably pleasing voice, for her execution and fine taste in delivery, and for her exquisite acting; so that nothing remains to be desired."
