= Maximilian Willmann =

Maximilian Willmann (full name Maximilian Friedrich Ludwig Willmann; 21 September 1767 – 7 March 1813) was a German cellist, one of a family of musicians. He played in the court orchestra of Bonn, and in Vienna.

== Life ==
Willmann's father, Johann Ignaz Willmann (1739–1815) was a musician, playing flute, violin and cello. Maximilian and his sisters Walburga and Magdalena were born in Bonn between 1767 and 1771; his half-sister Caroline, daughter of Ignaz and his second wife Marianne de Tribolet, was born in 1796.

Ignaz became in 1767 a member of the chamber orchestra of the Elector of Cologne in Bonn. The family moved to Vienna in the 1770s, and Ignaz joined the Tonkünstler-Sozietät. In 1784 he arranged a concert in which Maximilian and his sisters Walburga and Magdalena gave their Viennese concert debut.

The family became known to Archduke Maximilian Francis of Austria, who in 1784 became the Elector of Cologne. In 1788 he called Maximilian Willmann to Bonn as solo cellist; thus he was a colleague of the young Ludwig van Beethoven. After the disbandment of the Bonn musicians in 1794, in consequence of the French invasion, Willmann was for a short time in the court orchestra of the Prince of Thurn und Taxis in Regensburg, and later moved to Vienna, where he played in the theatre orchestra of Emanuel Schikaneder's Theater auf der Wieden. He died in Vienna in 1813, after a long illness.
