= Edward Naylor =

English composer (1867–1934)

- Born: Edward Woodall Naylor; 9 February 1867; Scarborough, England
- Died: 7 May 1934 (aged 67) Cambridge, England
- Genre: Classical
- Occupations: Organist, composer
- Instrument: Pipe organ

Edward Woodall Naylor (9 February 1867 – 7 May 1934) was an English organist and composer.

Naylor was born in Scarborough in 1867. His father, John Naylor, was organist of York Minster. He won a choral scholarship to Emmanuel College, Cambridge, where he gained a BA in 1887. From 1888 to 1892 he studied at the Royal College of Music. After spending eight years as organist of London churches St. Michael's Church, Chester Square (1889) and St. Mary's Church, Kilburn (1896), Naylor returned to Cambridge in 1898, where he became an assistant master at The Leys School and organist of Emmanuel College. Naylor lived in Cambridge until his death in 1934.

His most important compositions were for voices; his composition The Angelus, won the Ricordi prize for an English opera. His church music blends elements of 16th to 20th century music. Naylor was considered an authority on Shakespeare and music, and was an early exponent of greater musical authenticity.

His son, Bernard James Naylor (1907–1986) was the first composer (1948) living in Canada to employ post-tonal writing in choral music, and was one of the pioneers of a truly contemporary (post-tonal) English (Anglican) cathedral music in the mid-twentieth century.

== Incomplete list of musical works ==
=== Chamber music ===
- Quintet
- Piano Trio in D minor

=== Chorus and Orchestra ===
- Merlin and the Glen – A scena, performed at the Royal College of Music when he was a student.
- Requiem, Pax Dei, influenced by Giuseppe Verdi and Charles Villiers Stanford, performed in Cambridge in 1913.
- Arthur the King – a cantata aired at Harrogate in 1902.

=== Opera ===
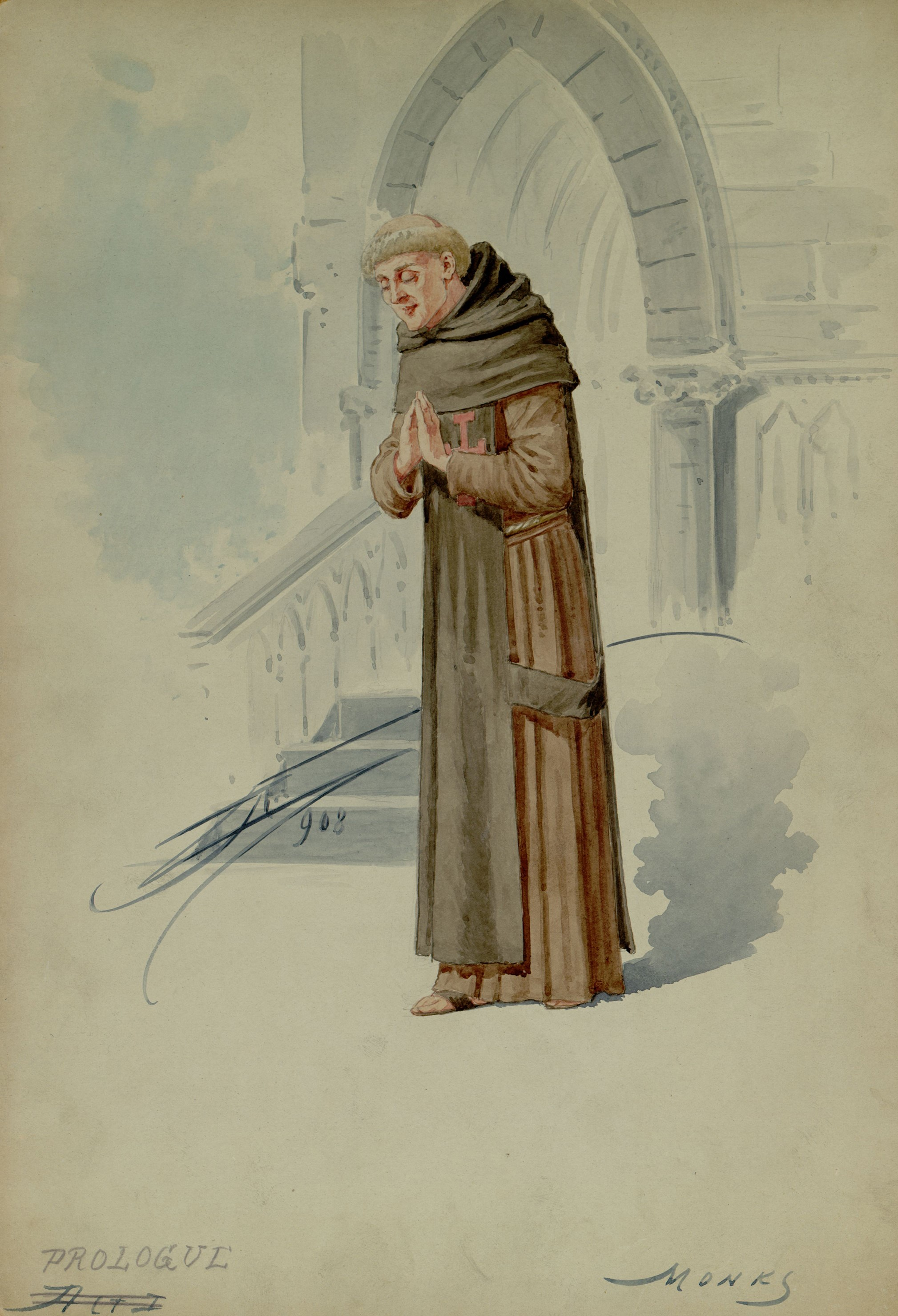
Monks, costume design for The Angelus prologue (1908).

- The Angelus – "A romantic opera in a Prologue and four Acts", performed at Covent Garden in 1909, revived by the Carl Rosa Opera Company in 1921. Libretto by Wilfrid Thornely. Received a £500 prize "offered by Messrs. Ricordi & Co. for an original opera from the pen of a British-born composer".

=== Church music ===
- A Hymn In Praise Of The Faith
- Eastern Monarchs – motet.
- I Will Cause The Shower – anthem for choir and organ.
- Jubilate Deo in A – for choir and organ.
- Jubilate Deo in A♭ – for male voices (TTBB) and organ.
- Magnificat and Nunc Dimittis – for double choir, written in 1903.
- Magnificat and Nunc Dimittis – for male voices (TTBB).
- Postlude in E♭ major – for organ.
- Hear my prayer, O God (Psalm 55) – for choir and organ.
- God Of Our Fathers, Known Of Old – recessional hymn, setting the text of Rudyard Kipling.
- O Jerusalem, Look About Thee – anthem for choir and organ.
- O Lord God to whom vengeance belongeth (Psalm 94) – for choir and organ.
- Te Deum in A – for choir and organ.
- Te Deum in E♭ – for unison voices and organ.
- This Is The Month Tonic
- Vox Dicentis – motet written in 1911.
- We Have Heard With Our Ears – for choir and organ.
- Final Responses – for festival and normal time.

=== Songs and part songs ===
- The Merry Bells of Yule
- The Charge of the Light Brigade

=== Orchestral ===
- Variations in B♭
- Tokugawa – Overture

=== Other publications ===
- Shakespeare and Music: With Illustrations from the Music of the 16th and 17th Centuries by Naylor, Edward W., New York: AMS Press, 1965.
- The Poets and Music 1928.
- An Elizabethan Virginal Book 1905.
