= Thomas Hewitt Jones =

British composer

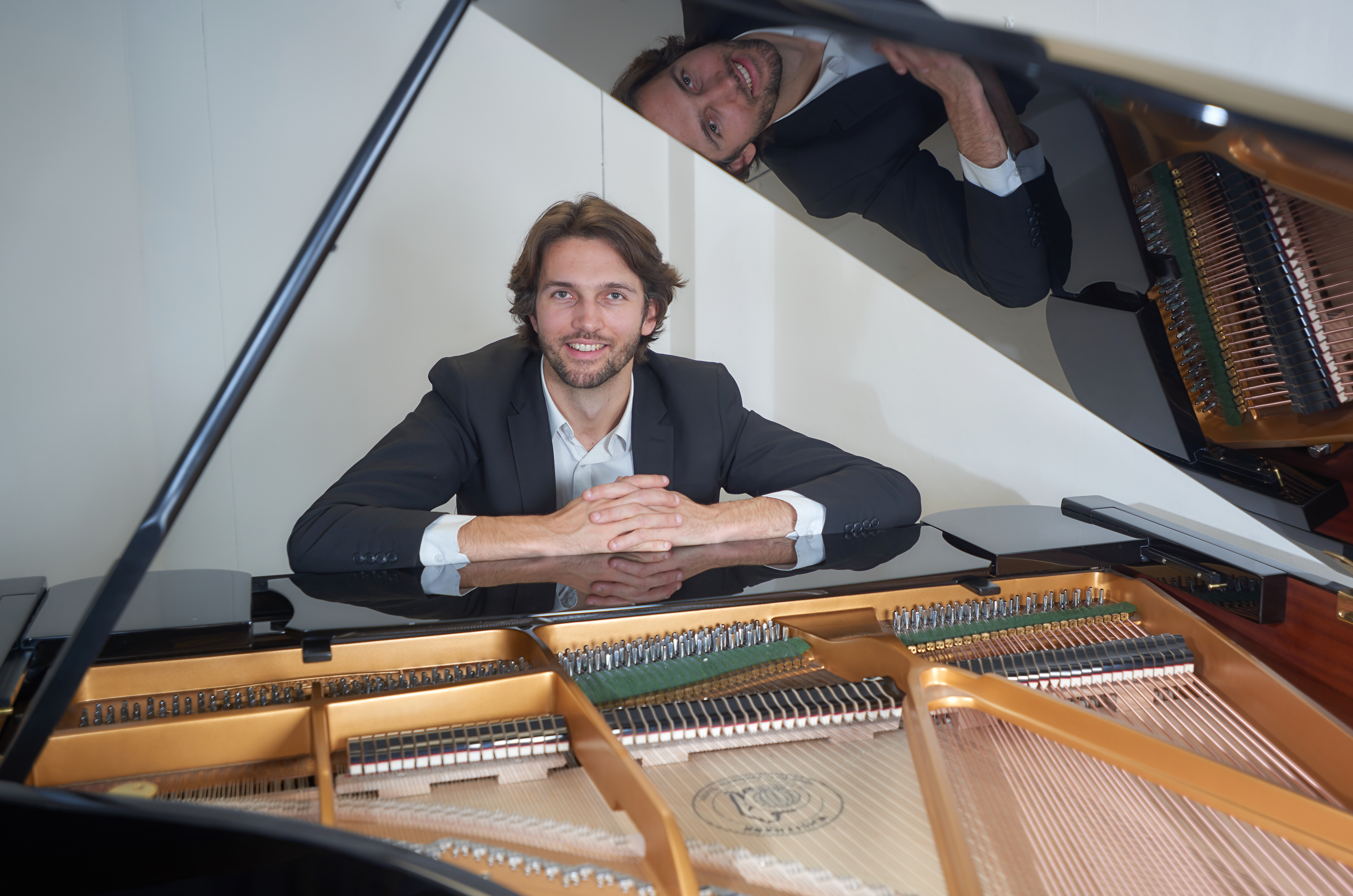
Thomas Hewitt Jones at the piano, 2020

Thomas Hewitt Jones (born 24 October 1984) is a British composer and music producer, working predominantly in the fields of contemporary classical and commercial music.

== Early life ==
Thomas Hewitt Jones was born in 1984 in Dulwich, South London, into a musical family; his parents are both musicians and his paternal grandparents were both composers. His grandfather Tony Hewitt-Jones was a composer, his father Tim is a cellist at the Royal Opera House, and his brother is the violinist Simon Hewitt Jones. Educated at Dulwich College, he went on to be the organ scholar at Gonville and Caius College, Cambridge. He was the winner of the 2003 BBC Young Composer of the Year competition.

== Composer ==
Hewitt Jones scored the music for the London 2012 Olympics Mascots animated films.

On 11 July 2016, outgoing Prime Minister David Cameron was recorded humming four notes of an unidentified tune, which created an internet furore; on the following day, Thomas Hewitt Jones released the sheet music for a Fantasy on David Cameron: arranged for high/low solo instrument(s) and piano, which he made available for download from the Classic FM website.

On 26 July 2017, his Worcester Service (Magnificat and Nunc Dimittis) was broadcast live on BBC Radio 3 from Worcester Cathedral. His Christmas carol Lullay, my Liking was recorded by British choir ORA Singers in 2017.

On 18 May 2020, during the COVID-19 lockdown, The Choir of Royal Holloway, University of London and soprano Laura Wright released a new single 'Can You Hear Me?', composed by Hewitt Jones with words by long-time collaborator Matt Harvey to raise awareness of mental health, encouraging those in need to seek support. His commercial track Funny Song went viral on the Tiktok platform in 2022. As of June 2025, it has 43 billion streams worldwide, has been used in 32 million YouTube Shorts, and is the second most played song on TikTok. The track is composed & performed (voice & piano) by Hewitt Jones, and published by Cavendish Music.

== Key works ==
- 2006 - The Facebook song (composed together with Peter Foggitt)
- 2008 - The Forbidden Kingdom soundtrack (assistant to composer David Buckley)
- 2008 - Under Milk Wood (for Ballet Cymru)
- 2008 - What Child is This?
- 2009 - How Green was my Valley (for Ballet Cymru)
- 2009 - Child of the Stable’s Secret Birth
- 2009 - Romance for viola and piano
- 2010 - Lady of the Lake (for Ballet Cymru)
- 2012 - London 2012 / LOCOG Mascot Animated Films (soundtracks)
- 2013 - Incarnation: A Suite of Songs for Christmas
- 2014 - Wildflower Meadows (for Arts for Rutland)
- 2015 - Panathenaia (for the British Museum)
- 2016 - Christmas Party (Christmas Violin Concerto)
- 2017 - Worcester Service (Magnificat & Nunc Dimittis)
- 2017 - Lullay, my Liking for ORA Singers, conducted by Suzi Digby
- 2018 - Electro Cello
- 2019 - Neoclassical
- 2021 - Cinematic Advertising
- 2022 - In Our Service

== Music producer ==
In 2009 he received a BBC Music Magazine "Premiere Album" award for producing an album of the music of Imogen Holst. He produced This is the Day (2012) for the English composer John Rutter and his choir the Cambridge Singers and Aurora Orchestra. Thomas scores production music from his own studio facility.

== Personal life ==
He lives in London with Annalisa, his wife, whom he married in 2020.
