= Simon Hewitt Jones =

English violinist

Simon Hewitt Jones (born November 1982) is an English musician. He is the Director of ViolinSchool, a researcher at the Royal Academy of Music in London. He is the grandson of composer Tony Hewitt-Jones and the brother of composer Thomas Hewitt Jones.

He has appeared as a featured violinist at many UK and international festivals and concert series, including the Henley and Spitalfields festivals. In 2011, he appeared with Diego Masson and the Ramallah Orchestra performing the Beethoven Violin Concerto in Jerusalem, and co-curated a concert tour called 'Road to Jericho', featuring contemporary British and Palestinian music in concerts both in the UK and in the Middle East. He is also a session violinist in London, where he has appeared on several film soundtracks, recordings and broadcasts for BBC, EMI, Virgin, and Universal Music.

He is the founder of ViolinSchool, an international centre for violin tuition and research based in London, UK.

Hewitt Jones previously co-founded Court Lane Music, an independent Classical record label whose premiere recording of string chamber music by Imogen Holst won a BBC Music Magazine award in 2010

He is the Artistic Director of Music and the City, a popular 'soiree' event for amateur and professional musicians.
