= P. J. Hannikainen =

Finnish composer

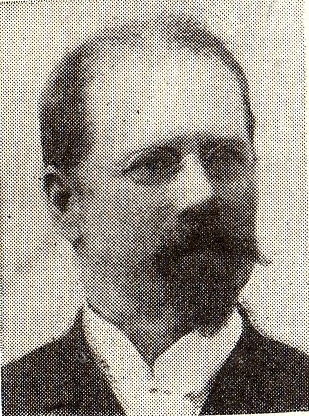
Pekka Hannikainen.

Pekka Juhani "P. J." Hannikainen (December 9, 1854 – September 13, 1924) was a Finnish composer and the head of the musical branch of the prominent Hannikainen family. His uncle was the writer and journalist Pietari Hannikainen.

Hannikainen was born in Nurmes but moved to Jyväskylä to attend school. He then studied chemistry in Helsinki and later lived in Jyväskylä and Helsinki, where he died.

Hannikainen was the founder and conductor of the first Finnish student choir, the YL Male Voice Choir, from 1882 to 1885. He also founded the Mieskuoro Sirkat choir in 1899. From 1887 to 1891, he was the editor of the first Finnish music magazine, Säveleitä.

He was the father of the violinist and composer Arvo Hannikainen (1897–1942), the writer Lauri Hannikainen (1889–1921), the composer Väinö Hannikainen (1900–1960), the pianist and composer Ilmari Hannikainen (1892–1955) and the cellist Tauno Hannikainen (1896–1968). He is buried in Hietaniemi Cemetery in Helsinki.
