= Walburga Willmann =

Walburga Willmann (full name Maximiliana Valentina Walburga Willmann; 18 May 1769 – 27 June 1835) was a German pianist and composer, one of a family of musicians.

== Life ==
Walburga's father, Johann Ignaz Willmann (1739–1815) was a musician, playing flute, violin and cello. Walburga and her siblings Maximilian and Magdalena were born in Bonn between 1767 and 1771; her half-sister Caroline, daughter of Ignaz and his second wife Marianne de Tribolet, was born in 1796.

Ignaz became in 1767 a member of the chamber orchestra of the Elector of Cologne in Bonn. The family moved to Vienna in the 1770s, and Ignaz joined the Tonkünstler-Sozietät. In 1784 he arranged a concert in which Walburga and her siblings Maximilian and Magdalena gave their Viennese concert debut. She is said to have studied the piano with Wolfgang Amadeus Mozart, and that she was one of his best pupils.

In the following years, the family went on concert tours of cities in Germany. In 1788 she was a teacher of the piano in Frankfurt am Main. Later she performed with the court orchestra in Bonn. In 1793 the family performed at the Elector's court in Münster.

She married in Vienna in 1797 the writer Franz Xaver Huber; the best man was Franz Xaver Süssmayr. From 1800 to 1804 she undertook further tours, to Leipzig, Dresden and Bonn. During her tours, she included her own compositions, and she composed in 1801 a piano concerto, now lost.

In 1804 Walburga went with her husband, who was a Napoleon sympathiser, into exile in Mainz. She died there in 1835.
