= Caroline Willmann =

German singer

Caroline Willmann (full name Maria Anna Magdalena Caroline Willmann; 25 February 1796 – c. 1860) was a German operatic soprano, and in her early career a pianist. She was one of a family of musicians.

== Life ==
Caroline was the daughter of Johann Ignaz Willmann (1739–1815), a musician, playing flute, violin and cello; and his second wife Marianne de Tribolet, an opera singer. Caroline was the half-sister of Maximilian, Walburga and Magdalena Willmann.

She was a pupil of Felice Blangini in Kassel. An early appearance in a concert in Kassel with her mother in February 1811 was reviewed in the Allgemeine musikalische Zeitung: "As a pianist, she has several times received well-earned applause. On this occasion she appeared for the first time as a singer in a grand and effective scena; the execution and fine intonation already acquired, under the instruction of her mother, justify the expectation that, if she so continues, we shall have in her a very fine singer. She deserves all encouragement, and received it in loud applause".

After her mother's death, she sang in Budapest, at the court opera in Vienna, and in Breslau (now Wrocław). Alexander Wheelock Thayer wrote: "Her voice—she was but eighteen years old—was not powerful, but very pure and sweet, except in the middle tones, and of remarkable extent in the upper register." At Breslau, wrote Thayer, "the great beauty of her voice, its excellent cultivation by her mother and Blangini, her fine taste, her charming acting and her beauty, made her a general favourite."

In 1816 to 1818 she appeared at the Theater an der Wien in Vienna; roles included the Queen of the Night and Elvira in Mozart's operas The Magic Flute and Don Giovanni. She appeared in 1819 in Munich and Stuttgart, 1820 in Dresden, 1823 in Kassel, and 1825 in Berlin; Thayer commented "with varied success".

Her life after 1825 is mostly unrecorded; she is known to have been a singing teacher in Bayreuth in 1830. She is thought to have died in Vienna about 1860.
