= Marianne Willmann =

German singer (1768–1813)

Marianne Willmann (née Anna Maria Antonetta de Tribolet; 17 February 1768 – 21 April 1813) was a German operatic soprano. She was one of a family of musicians.

== Life ==
Marianne was born in Paderborn in 1768, the daughter of a professor of French at the University of Bonn. She did not belong to the Court music of Bonn, but sang in the opera, her first recorded appearance being in November 1790.

She married in 1793 Ignaz Willmann (1739–1815), a musician, who played flute, violin and cello. She was his second wife, becoming stepmother to Maximilian, Walburga and Magdalena Willmann. Their daughter Caroline, an opera singer, was born in 1796.

Marianne accompanied Ignaz and Magdalena to Venice in 1793; she sang in Graz the next year, and in 1795 made her first appearance in Vienna, in Ignaz Umlauf's Die Schöne Schusterin, and "greatly pleased". In Hamburg (20 September to 4 October 1801) she sang to crowded houses, departing from the city, wrote the correspondent of the Allgemeine musikalische Zeitung, "delighted with her extraordinary reception and emoluments."

In 1803 she sang at the Theater an der Wien in Vienna, and in July 1804 in Munich. She was next engaged for the Opera in Kassel. Upon the organisation of Jérôme Bonaparte's French Theatre there, she retired for a time, and sang only in concerts, including a concert for Ferdinand Ries in January 1811. In October and November of that year she was again in Munich, where she was a favourite, and returned to Munich in March 1812 to take part in a concert.

Marianne died in 1813 in Klosterneuburg. The correspondent of a Leipzig journal summed up her qualities thus: "A splendid execution, an imposing voice, practised skill and science in singing, distinguish her most favourably above many celebrities."
