= Tauno Hannikainen =

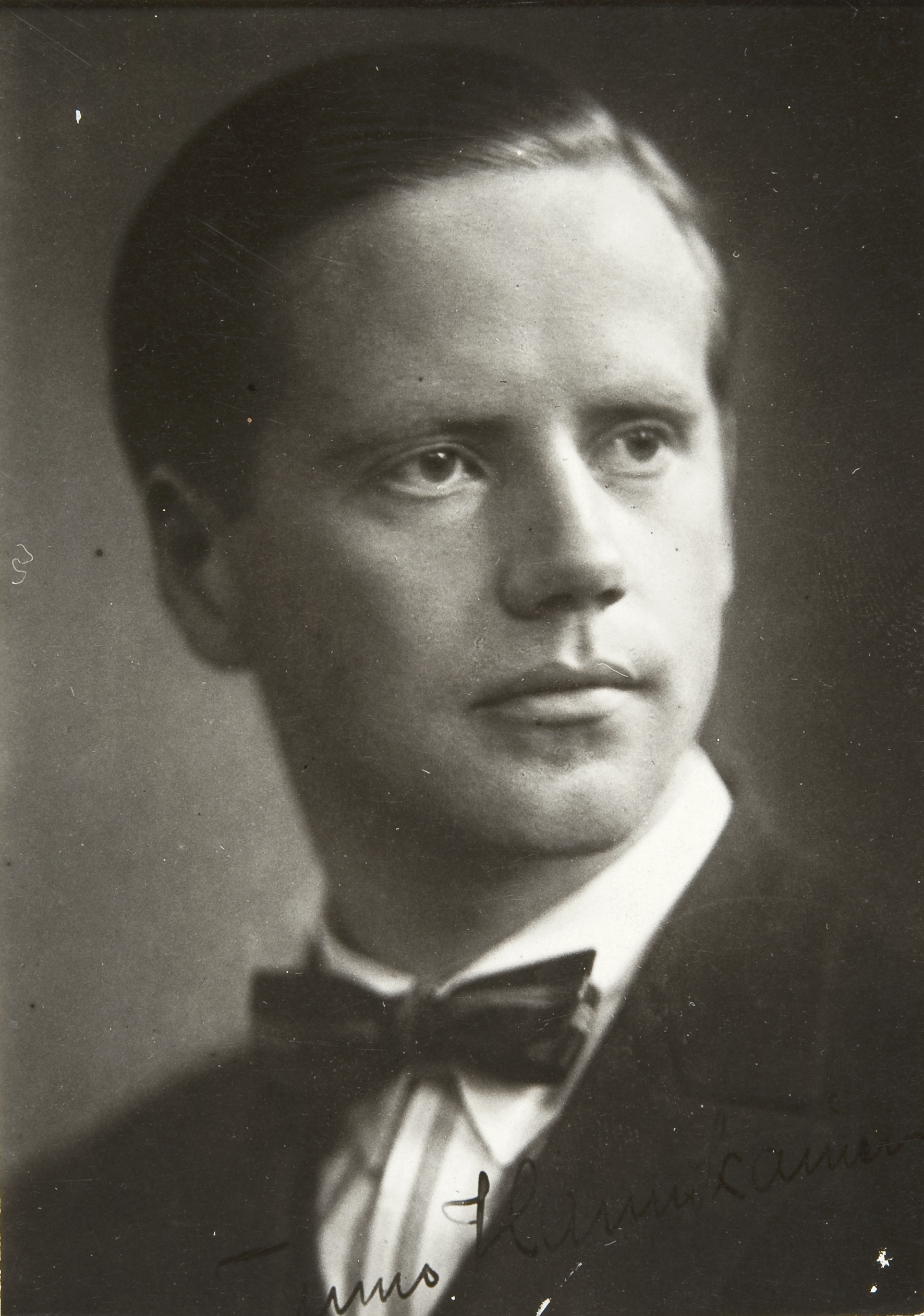
Hannikainen (c. 1920s)

Tauno Heikki Hannikainen (February 26, 1896 – October 12, 1968) was a Finnish cellist and conductor.

Born in Jyväskylä, he was the son of the composer Pekka Juhani Hannikainen. The pianist Ilmari Hannikainen and the harpist Väinö Hannikainen were his brothers. He studied first as a cellist in Helsinki and abroad. From 1922 he became the second conductor in the Finnish Opera House in Helsinki. He conducted the music at Sibelius's funeral. He went to the USA in 1940, becoming music director of the Duluth Symphony Orchestra (1942–47). He was an assistant conductor (1947–49) and associate conductor (1949–50) with the Chicago Symphony Orchestra, and was principal conductor of the Helsinki Philharmonic Orchestra. His grand-son Tuomas Olilla-Hainikainen (b.1965)is also a conductor.

== Discography ==
- Jean Sibelius, Symphony No. 2 in D major, Op. 43 – Sinfonia of London (World Record Club) (1959)
- Jean Sibelius, Symphony No. 4 in A minor, Op. 63 - USSR S.S.O. (Melodiya)
- Jean Sibelius, Symphony No. 5 in E flat major, Op. 82 – Sinfonia of London (World Record Club T 42) (1959)
- Jean Sibelius, Violin Concerto in D minor, Op. 47 – Tossy Spivakovsky / London S.O. (Everest records/World Record Club T 94)
- Jean Sibelius, Violin Concerto in D minor – Oleg Kagan / Finnish R.S.O. (Live Class)
- Jean Sibelius, Karelia Suite, Op. 11 – Sinfonia of London (World Record Club T 42)
- Jean Sibelius, Lemminkäinen Legends (Four Legends from the Kalevala), Op. 22 – USSR R.S.O. (Melodiya)
- Jean Sibelius, Finlandia, Op. 26 – USSR R.S.O. (Melodiya)
- Jean Sibelius, Valse Triste, Op. 44, No. 1 – USSR R.S.O. (Mosoblsovnarhoz)
- Jean Sibelius, Tapiola, Op. 112 – London S.O. (Everest records/World Record Club T 94)(1960)
- Uuno Klami, "Terchenniemi" from Kalevala Suite Op. 23 – USSR R.S.O. (Mosoblsovnarhoz)
- Armas Järnefelt, Lullaby – USSR R.S.O. (Mosoblsovnarhoz)

== Sources ==
- Eaglefield-Hull, A. A Dictionary of Modern Music and Musicians. Dent, London 1924.

Preceded by -	Principal Conductors, Turku Philharmonic Orchestra; 1927–1928	Succeeded by Toivo Haapanen
Preceded by Toivo Haapanen	Principal Conductors, Turku Philharmonic Orchestra; 1929–1939	Succeeded by Eero Selin
Preceded by Martti Similä	Principal Conductors, Helsinki Philharmonic Orchestra; 1951–1963	Succeeded by Jorma Panula
