= Heikki Hannikainen =

Finnish diplomat (1915–1989)

Finland Ambassador to Spain
- In office 1972–1978

Heikki Juhani Hannikainen (1915–1989) was a Finnish diplomat, a master of philosophy. He was the son of journalist Lauri Hannikainen (1889–1921) and Sigrid (Siiri) Maria Hannikainen. He was an ambassador in Peru, Venezuela and Colombia between 1963 and 1967, as Ambassador of Foreign Affairs in 1968–1972 and Ambassador in Madrid from 1972 to 1978.

In 1968, he received a diplomatic title of Specialty and Plenipotentiary Minister.

His daughter was the composer Ann-Elise Hannikainen (14 January 1946 – 19 November 2012).
