= Ilmari Hannikainen =

Finnish pianist and composer (1892–1955)

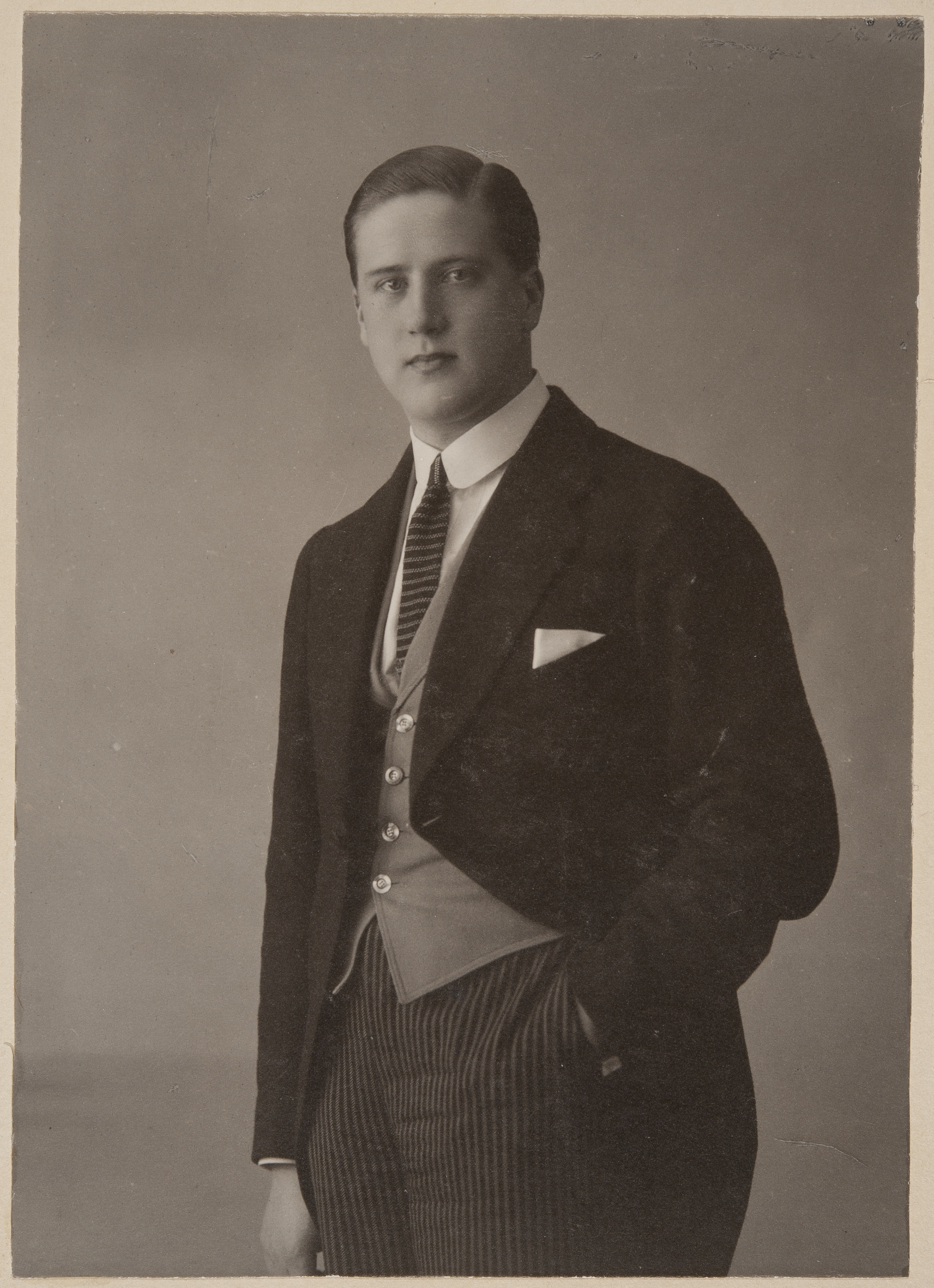
Ilmari Hannikainen in the early 1920s.

Toivo Ilmari Hannikainen (19 October 1892 – 25 July 1955) was a Finnish composer and virtuoso pianist.

== Life ==
Hannikainen was born in Jyväskylä, central Finland, the son of Pekka Juhani Hannikainen and the brother of Väinö Hannikainen, both of whom were composers and of Tauno Hannikainen who was a cellist and conductor. After studying at the University of Helsinki (1911–14), he became a pupil of Franz Schreker at the Musikakademie in Vienna, and continued his studies with Alexander Siloti in Saint Petersburg (1915–17) and with Alfred Cortot in Paris (1919). Returning to Finland, he taught piano at the Helsinki Conservatory and later gained a Professorship at the Sibelius Academy.

Hannikainen steered Finnish classical music from late Romanticism towards Impressionism. In addition to his piano miniatures, which best illustrated this development, he composed one opera, one piano concerto, one piano quartet, lieder, and film scores (notably, the 1934 Swedish film Sången om den eldröda blomman).

Hannikainen drowned during a sailing trip in Kuhmoinen in 1955. Some musical colleagues, like Aarre Merikanto, considered his death a suicide. He is buried in the Hietaniemi Cemetery in Helsinki.

In the 1970s, the Ilmari Hannikainen Pianokilpailu (Ilmari Hannikainen Piano Competition) was created dedicated to Hannikainen. In 2020, the competition renewed its format style.
