= Ann-Elise Hannikainen =

Finnish composer

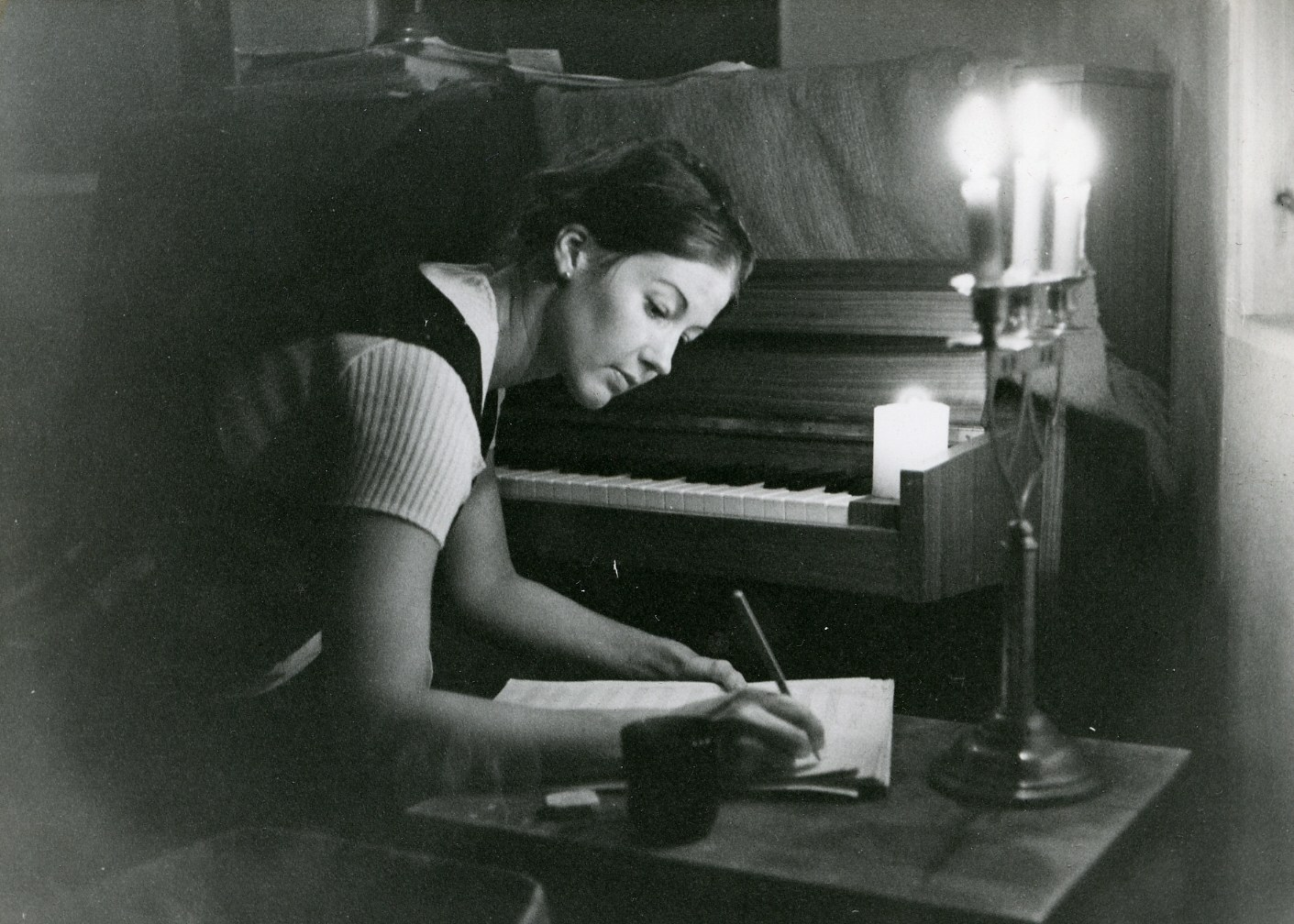
Ann-Elise Hannikainen in the late 1960s.

Ann-Elise Hannikainen (14 January 1946 – 19 November 2012) was a Finnish composer. She was born in Hanko, Finland, the daughter of diplomate Heikki Hannikainen and his wife Marianne. She studied music in Finland at the Sibelius Academy with Einar Englund for composition and Tapani Valsta for piano. In 1972, she moved to Spain, where she studied composition with Ernesto Halffter Escriche at the Academia Moderne de Musica.

Hannikainen became Halffter's companion during his later life. After his death she moved back to Finland in 1989, and died in Helsinki in 2012.

== Selected works ==
Hannikainen composed mainly instrumental works. Selected compositions include:

- Anerfálicas: Tema y 11 variaciones (1973)
- Pensamientos 1974 (1974)
- Toccata-fantasia for piano (1975)
- Concerto (in honour of Manuel de Falla's 100th anniversary) (1976)
- Cosmos for orchestra (1977)
- Sextet for wind quintet and piano (1980)
- Trio for flute, viola and piano (1985)
