= Wiener Tonkünstler-Orchester =

Viennese orchestra

The Wiener Tonkünstler-Orchester was an orchestra association in Vienna, which existed until 1933.

== History ==
The predecessor institution was the Tonkünstler-Sozietät, which was founded in 1771 on the initiative of the composer Florian Leopold Gassmann. The partnership was to organise musical events for the public in Vienna. The oratorio Betulia liberata, composed by Gassmann and premiered on 19 March 1772, was the first performance of the partnership, whose main task was to care for the widows and orphans of deceased members.

The name of the orchestra goes back to this historical musical institution and lived on in the Wiener Tonkünstler-Orchester, founded at the beginning of the 20th century, which gave its first concert on 10 October 1907 in the Wiener Musikverein under the conductors Oskar Nedbal, Hans Pfitzner and Bernhard Stavenhagen with works by Goldmark, Grieg, Liszt and Beethoven. The Vienna Tonkünstler Orchestra made music history in 1913 with the world premiere of Arnold Schönberg's Gurre-Lieder under the conduct of Franz Schreker. The Sunday afternoon concerts of the Tonkünstler Orchestra were very popular with the Viennese public. During the First World War, the Tonkünstler Orchestra and the so-called Wiener Concertverein had to merge due to material hardship. In 1921, this became the Vienna Symphony Orchestra, succeeded by the Wiener Symphoniker. However, the association of the Tonkünstler Orchestra remained in existence as a concert organiser until 1933.
