= Ferrabosco =

Ferrabosco is the name of several musicians and composers, all from a family originating in Bologna:

- Domenico Ferrabosco (1513–1574), Italian composer and singer

- Alfonso Ferrabosco the elder (1543–1588), Italian composer mainly active in England, and instrumental in bringing the Italian madrigal there; eldest son of Domenico Ferrabosco

- Alfonso Ferrabosco the younger (1575–1628), English composer, son of Alfonso the elder, a singer, and performer on the lute and viol

- Alfonso Ferrabosco III (junior) (died 1652), an English composer and court musician, son of Ferrabosco the younger
- Henry Ferrabosco (died 1658?), a court musician before and during the First English Civil War, son of Ferrabosco the younger
- John Ferrabosco (1626–1682), English organist and composer, youngest son of Alfonso Ferrabosco the younger

- Matthia Ferrabosco (1550–1616), Italian singer and composer
- Constantino Ferrabosco (late 16th century), Italian composer, most likely the brother of Matthia
