= Richard Charteris (musicologist) =

New Zealand musicologist

Richard Charteris FAHA (born June 24, 1948) is a New Zealand born Australian musicologist.

== Life and career ==
Born in the Chatham Islands, New Zealand, Richard Charteris graduated from Victoria University of Wellington with a BA in 1970. He then pursued graduate studies at the University of Canterbury where he earned a MA in 1972 and a doctorate in 1976. His doctoral dissertation was on 16th century English composer John Coprario.

Charteris was a research fellow at the University of Sydney from 1976–1978 and again from 1981–1990. In between these two periods he was a research fellow at the University of Queensland from 1979–1980. He served as a senior research fellow (reader) in musicology at the University of Sydney from 1991–1994, and in 1995 he was made a professor of musicology at the University of Sydney. In 1990 he was elected Fellow of the Australian Academy of the Humanities.

In 2002 Charteris was elected a Fellow of the Royal Historical Society. In 2003 he was awarded the Centenary Medal.

Charteris has published a large number of works, particularly scholarly publications on European music of the 16th and 17th centuries. He is a recognized expert on historically informed performance, and has collaborated with early music ensembles like Paul McCreesh's Gabrieli Consort & Players to make recordings for labels like Deutsche Grammophon, Sony Classical, EMI Classics, and Hyperion among others. He is also a recognized expert on the Music of Venice, and has published critical editions of the works of Giovanni Gabrieli, Giovanni Bassano, Domenico Ferrabosco, Alfonso Ferrabosco the elder, Alfonso Ferrabosco the younger, and Alfonso Ferrabosco III. He has also written extensively on the composers J.C. Bach, Giovanni Croce, Hans Leo Hassler, John Hingeston, Thomas Lupo, Claudio Monteverdi and Adam Gumpelzhaimer.
