= 1588 in music =

== Events ==
- 8 July – Thomas Morley received the degree Bachelor of Music from Oxford University
- Ferdinando de' Medici appoints Emilio de' Cavalieri artistic superintendent of the Medici court in Florence

== Publications ==
- Blasius Amon – 4 Masses (Vienna: Michael Apffl)
- Giammateo Asola
  - Masses for eight voices, 2 vols. (Venice: Ricciardo Amadino)
  - 4 Masses for five voices (Venice: Giacomo Vincenti)
  - Lamentations (Venice: Ricciardo Amadino)
- Ippolito Baccusi – First book of masses for four voices (Venice: Angelo Gardano)
- Giovanni Bassano – Il fiore dei capricci musicali for four voices (Venice: Giacomo Vincenti), a collection of instrumental pieces
- William Byrd – Psalmes, Sonets and Songs of Sadness and Pietie for five voices (London: Thomas East for William Byrd)
- Giovanni Croce – First book of canzonettas for four voices (Venice: Giacomo Vincenti)
- Giovanni Dragoni – First book of villanelle for five voices (Venice: Girolamo Scotto)
- Placido Falconio – Magnificat octo tonorum for four voices (Venice: Angelo Gardano)
- Stefano Felis – First book of masses for six voices (Prague: Georg Nigrinus)
- Andrea Gabrieli – Chori in musica sopra li chori della tragedia di Edippo Tiranno (Venice: Angelo Gardano), incidental music from a 1585 play, published posthumously
- Bartholomäus Gesius – Historia vom Leiden und Sterben unsers Herren und Heilandes Jesu Christi wie sie uns der Evangelista Johannes im 18 und 19 Cap. beschrieben for two, three, four, and five voices (Wittenberg: Mattäus Welack)
- Ruggiero Giovannelli – First book of villanelle et arie alla napolitana for three voices (Rome: Alessandro Gardano)
- Gioseffo Guami – Lamentations for six voices (Venice: Giacomo Vincenti)
- Marc'Antonio Ingegneri
  - Responsoria hebdomadae sanctae for four and six voices (Venice: Ricciardo Amadino)
  - Lamentations for four voices (Venice: Ricciardo Amadino)
- Orlande de Lassus
  - Motets for four and eight voices (Paris: Le Roy & Ballard)
  - Motets for five voices (Paris: Le Roy & Ballard)
  - Motets for six voices (Paris: Le Roy & Ballard)
- Luca Marenzio – First book of madrigals for four, five, and six voices (Venice: Giacomo Vincenti)
- Rinaldo del Mel
  - Sacrae cantiones for five, six, seven, eight, and twelve voices (Antwerp: Pierre Phalèse and Jean Bellère)
  - Madrigals for six voices (Antwerp: Pierre Phalèse & Jean Bellère)
- Philippe de Monte – Thirteenth book of madrigals for five voices (Venice: Angelo Gardano)
- Giovanni Bernardino Nanino – First book of madrigals for five voices (Venice: Angelo Gardano)
- Giovanni Pierluigi da Palestrina – First book of Lamentations (Rome: Alessandro Gardano)
- Benedetto Pallavicino – Fourth book of madrigals for five voices (Venice: Angelo Gardano)
- Giuliano Paratico – Second book of canzonettas for three voices (Brescia: Pietro Maria Marchetti)
- Giovanni Battista Pinello di Ghirardi – Motets for five voices (Prague: Georg Nigrinus)
- Orfeo Vecchi – Masses for five voices (Milan: Francesco & heirs of Simon Tini)
- Giaches de Wert – Ninth book of madrigals for five voices
- Nicholas Yonge (ed.) – Musica Transalpina, (London: Thomas East), a collection of Italian madrigals with English translated lyrics, credited with sparking the English Madrigal School
- The Walsingham Consort Books are copied, probably by Daniel Bacheler, who was only 15 or 16 years old at the time and contributed seven of his own pieces to this collection for broken consort

== Classical music ==
- Krzysztof Klabon – Pieśni Kalliopy Slowieńskiey: na terażnieysze pod Byczyną zwycięstwo, a cycle of six songs for voice and lute to texts by Stanisław Grochowski, celebrating the Battle of Byczyna, which ended the War of the Polish Succession

== Births ==
- June 9 (bapt.) – Johann Andreas Herbst, German composer and music theorist (d. 1666)
- June 30 – Giovanni Maria Sabino, Italian organist and composer (d. 1649)
- September 10 (bapt.) – Nicholas Lanier, English lutenist and composer (d. 1666)
- September 8 – Marin Mersenne, French mathematician and music theorist (d. 1648)

== Deaths ==
- August 12 – Alfonso Ferrabosco (I), composer (b. 1543)
