= 1608 in music =

The year 1608 in music involved some significant events and new musical works.

== Events ==
- February 9 – The masque The Hue and Cry After Cupid, written by Ben Jonson and designed by Inigo Jones, is performed at Whitehall Palace. The masque features the music of Alfonso Ferrabosco the younger.
- June 4 – Claudio Monteverdi's latest work, Il ballo delle ingrate, is given its first performance in Mantua as part of the wedding celebrations for Francesco Gonzaga (the son of Monteverdri's patron Duke Vincenzo of Mantua) and Margaret of Savoy. In the same year, Monteverdi asks to be allowed to resign his post with the Gonzaga family.

== Classical music ==
- none listed

== Publications ==
- Giovanni Francesco Anerio – Second book of madrigals for five and six voices (Venice: Giacomo Vincenti)
- Costanzo Antegnati – L'Antegnata, Op. 16 (Venice: Angelo Gardano e fratelli), a collection of intabulated ricercars for the organ
- Adriano Banchieri – Festino nella sera del giovedi grasso avanti cena, Op. 18 (Venice: Ricciardo Amadino), a madrigal comedy
- Giulio Belli – Missae sacrae for four, five, six, and eight voices with continuo (Venice: Angelo Gardano e fratelli)
- Antonio Cifra – Second book of madrigals for five voices (Venice: Giacomo Vincenti)
- Christoph Demantius – Conviviorum deliciae for six voices and instruments (Nuremberg: Balthasar Scherff for David Kauffmann), a collection of dance music
- Juan Esquivel Barahona
  - First book of masses (Salamanca: Arti Taberniel)
  - Motecta festorum et dominicarum cum communi sanctorum for four, five, six, and eight voices (Salamanca: Arti Taberniel)
- Melchior Franck
  - Geistliche Gesäng und Melodeyen (Sacred Songs and Melodies) for five, six, and eight voices (Coburg: Justus Hauck), mostly setting texts from the Song of Songs
  - Neue Musicalische Intraden for various instruments but especially violas, in six parts (Nuremberg: David Kauffmann)
  - Cantica gratulatoria for five voices (Coburg: Kaspar Bertsch), a wedding song
  - Der CXXI. Psalm for five voices (Coburg: Kaspar Bertsch), a setting of Psalm 121
  - Neues Echo for eight voices (Coburg: Justus Hauck)
  - Dialogus metricus for seven voices (Coburg: Justus Hauck), a Christmas motet
- Girolamo Frescobaldi
  - Il primo libro de' madrigali
  - Primo libro delle fantasie
- Marco da Gagliano – Fifth book of madrigals for five voices (Venice: Angelo Gardano e fratelli)
- Bartholomäus Gesius – Dictum ex Psalmo XXXIIII. De excubiis et custodia Angelorum for six voices (Frankfurt an der Oder: Friedrich Hartmann), a wedding motet
- Gioseffo Guami – Second book of motets for choir and instruments (Milan: heirs of Agostino Tradate)
- Pierre Guédron – Airs de cours for four and five voices (Paris: Pierre Ballard)
- Cesario Gussago – Sonatas for four, six, and eight (Venice: Ricciardo Amadino)
- Hans Leo Hassler – Kirchengesäng for four voices (Nuremberg: Paul Kauffmann), a collection of sacred songs
- Sigismondo d'India – First book of villanelle alla napolitana for three voices (Naples: Giovanni Giacomo Carlino & Costantino Vitale)
- Robert Jones – Ultimum vale, with a triplicity of musicke...
- Claude Le Jeune
  - Second book of 50 psalms for three voices (Paris: Pierre Ballard), published posthumously
  - Airs for three, four, five, and six voices (Paris: Pierre Ballard), published posthumously
  - Second book of airs for three, four, five, and six voices (Paris: Pierre Ballard), published posthumously
- Claudio Merulo – Third book of ricercari da cantare for four voices (Venice: Angelo Gardano & fratelli), published posthumously
- Pomponio Nenna – Seventh book of madrigals for five voices (Naples: Giovanni Battista Sotile)
- Asprilio Pacelli – Sacrae cantiones, book 1 (Venice, Angelo Gardano e fratelli)
- Franciscus Pappus – Sacrae cantiones, book 1 (Milan: Simon Tini & Filippo Lomazzo)
- Vincenzo Passerini – Second book of madrigals for five voices (Venice: Ricciardo Amadino)
- Orfeo Vecchi – Cantiones sacrae for five voices (Antwerp: Pierre Phalèse), published posthumously
- Thomas Weelkes – Ayeres Or Phantasticke Spirites for three voices

== Opera ==
- Claudio Monteverdi – L'Arianna (mostly lost)
- Marco da Gagliano – La Dafne

== Births ==
- date unknown – Francisco Lopez Capillas, Mexican composer (died 1674)

== Deaths ==
- October 26 – Philipp Nicolai, composer (born 1556)
- date unknown
  - Luca Bati, composer (born 1546)
  - Peter Lupo, court musician and composer, son of Ambrose Lupo
  - Simone Verovio, printer of music books
