= Alfonso Ferrabosco =

Alfonso Ferrabosco may refer to:

- Alfonso Ferrabosco the elder (1543–1588), Italian composer mainly active in England, and instrumental in bringing the Italian madrigal there; eldest son of Domenico Ferrabosco
- Alfonso Ferrabosco the younger (1575–1628), English composer, son of Alfonso senior, also a singer, and performer on the lute and viol
- Alfonso Ferrabosco III (junior) (died 1661), English composer and court musician
