= Thomas Lupo the elder =

English composer and viol player (1571–1627)

Fantasia à3 in G, VdGS No.15 for 3 Tenor Viols from John Merro's Book, Tenbury Manuscripts of St. Michael's College, Oxford. Bodleian Library, Mus.Sch.d.245-47 (ca.1620-30)

Fantasia à3 in d, VdGS No.26 for 3 Bass Viols from John Merro's Book, Tenbury Manuscripts of St. Michael's College, Oxford. Bodleian Library, Mus.Sch.d.245-47 (ca.1620-30)
Performed by Phillip W. Serna, Viols

Thomas Lupo (baptised 7 August 1571 – probably December 1627) was an English composer and viol player of the late Elizabethan and Jacobean eras. Along with Orlando Gibbons, John Coprario, and Alfonso Ferrabosco, he was one of the principal developers of the repertory for viol consort.

== Life ==
He was part of a distinguished family of musicians, who included several generations. His father was Joseph Lupo, a string player and composer from Venice who had come first to Antwerp, and then to London; Thomas was probably born there. In 1588 he joined the violin consort at the court of Queen Elizabeth I – he was only 16 – but evidently he was not paid for his service until 1591. Thomas retained this position, or variants thereof, for his entire life. During the Jacobean era, he served both in the households of Prince Henry (after 1610) and Prince Charles (after 1617).

A surviving record from 1627 indicates that he was in financial trouble, and had to sign away £100 of his future income to pay off his creditors: the report goes on to state that his wife violently attempted to prevent him from doing so.

He died in London, probably in December 1627.

== Music and influence ==
Lupo was one of the principal figures in the development of the viol consort repertory. In addition, he was a significant composer of sacred vocal music. He probably wrote a considerable quantity of music for the court violin ensemble, however almost none of it survives; it has been hypothesised that much of the anonymous repertory for this group is by Lupo.

Most of the music for viols which Lupo wrote, for two, three, four, five, and six parts, dates from his employment in the household of Prince Charles. Many of the pieces use a contrapuntal and textural style reminiscent of the Italian madrigal, especially the pieces for five and six voices: in particular he imitated the style of Marenzio, whose works were well known in England, having made up a large part of Nicholas Yonge's 1588 Musica transalpina, which started the vogue for madrigals in England.

His consort music for three and four parts is more experimental, often using combinations rare in other composers of the time, such as three basses together, or three trebles together. Some of the consort music was designed to be accompanied by organ.

Specific types of instrumental compositions by Lupo include fantasias (12 for six parts, 35 for five parts, 13 for four parts, and 24 for three parts); pavanes, galliards, and Almands (allemandes). Some of the fantasias are direct transcriptions of Italian madrigals.

== Family tree ==
Jeronimo Bassano
Alvise Bassano	Ambrose (died 1591)	Lucia
Laura Bassano	Joseph	Peter Lupo (1535–1608)	Katherine
Thomas (1571–1627)	Horatio	Thomas
Theophilus Lupo

== See also ==
- Lupo family

== References and further reading ==
- Peter Holman: "Thomas Lupo", Grove Music Online, ed. L. Macy (Accessed April 6, 2006), (subscription access)
