= Ancor che col partire =

"Ancor che col partire" is a four-voice Italian-language madrigal with music by the Italy-based Flemish composer Cipriano de Rore first published by Antonio Gardano in 1547. The madrigal became de Rore's most popular work, one of the most widely distributed madrigals of the entire 16th Century, and was the basis for further variations, adaptations and ornamentations by many other composers including Antonio de Cabezon, Andrea Gabrieli, and Giovanni Bassano.

== Lyrics ==
Original lyrics:

Ancor che col partire / Io mi senta morire

Partir vorrei ogn'or, ogni momento / Tant'è il piacer ch'io sento

de la vita ch'acquisto nel ritorno / E così mille e mille volt'il giorno

partir da voi vorrei / tanto son dolci gli ritorni miei

English translation:

Although, in departing,

I feel as though I am dying,

I would wish to depart at every hour, at every moment,

So great is the pleasure I feel

From the life I gain upon returning.

And so a thousand and a thousand times each day

I would wish to leave you,

So sweet are my returns.
