= Ricercate, passaggi et cadentie =

The title page of Ricercate, passaggi et cadentie

Ricercate, passaggi et cadentie per potersi essercitar nel diminuir terminatamente con ogni sorte d’istrumento; et anco diversi passaggi per la semplice voce (Ricercars, passages and cadences to facilitate practicing accomplished diminutions on all kinds of instruments; and also various passages for just the voice) is a didactic work written by Giovanni Bassano. It was first published in 1585 and was one of the few works that Bassano wrote under the tutelage of Giovanni Gabrieli.

The book consists of four parts: the first consists of eight ricercate, followed by a number of passaggi with diminutions, then a group of ornamented cadentie (cadences), and finally two ornamented versions of the upper voice of a four-part madrigal. Each of the first three sections is presented in different modes and focuses on a different technique of ornamentation when transcribing vocal works for instruments. The book gives detailed information on the importance of a proper transcription and is meant to be played similar to an étude. The book purports to be playable on any treble instrument, but is most likely intended for the cornett as Bassano himself was a cornettist.

== Details ==
The book consists of eight ricercate, forty-five passaggi with up to eight diminuiti each, eight basic cadentie (cadences), with up to ten diminutions each, and concludes with two different ornamented versions of the upper voice of Signor mio caro by Cipriano de Rore, from his First Book of Madrigals for four voices (1550). The collection is written in a late phase of mensural notation with most notes resembling the whole notes, half notes, quarter notes, eighth notes, sixteenth notes, and thirty-second notes of modern notation. The smallest subdivision is the thirty-second note (bissicroma), a symbol that Bassano takes pains to explain in his preface "Ai lettori" (to the readers): "intenderete in questa mia opera quadruplicata cioè trentadue al valor de una Semibreve" ("meant [to represent] in this, my work, a quadruplicata, which is to say thirty-two to the value of one whole note"), but most modern interpretations of the piece play the eighth notes faster depending on how many are written into a measure. Usually the more eighth notes in a measure the faster they are played.

=== Ricercate ===
Each of the eight ricercate starts in a different mode but follows a structure similar to the others. The ricercate each start with slow motifs, usually outlining a triad to establish the tonic of the piece. Each piece progresses from a simple, slow melody to very fast and quick scalar runs that can span several octaves. As the runs get faster, they cadence with half-step-like trills. After the cadence, the melody starts slowly again and then quickly races back into its flashy runs until it cadences again with another set of half-step trills. This sequence will happen multiple times throughout each ricercata, and every ricercata ends with this trill-like cadence.

=== Passaggi diminuiti and cadentie diminuite ===
The passaggi diminuiti consist mainly of short but fast runs that are separated by one or more semibreves. The cadentie diminuite are similar to the passaggi diminuiti, but the flashy runs are much more elaborate and drawn out, and nearly all of them end with the same half-step cadential trills seen in the ricercate.
