= Joseph Lupo =

16th-century Italian musician and composer

Joseph Lupo was an Italian viol player and composer active for 40 years or more at the court of Elizabeth I of England. His brother Peter and their father Ambrose also served as court musicians. Born in Venice to Ambrose and his first wife Lucia, he and his brother first went to Antwerp (where Joseph joined the musicians' guild on 20 August 1557) before moving to England, where Joseph succeeded another Italian, Paul Galliardello, who returned to Venice in May 1563. He married Laura, daughter of Alvise Bassano and granddaughter of the musician Jeronimo Bassano (again possibly Italian Jewish), and played at the funeral of Elizabeth I. His sons Thomas, probably born in London, and Horatio also became court musicians.

== Family tree ==
Jeronimo Bassano
Alvise Bassano	Ambrose	Lucia
Laura Bassano	Joseph	Peter Lupo	Katherine
Thomas	Horatio	Thomas
Theophilus Lupo

== See also ==
- Lupo family
