= James Hawkins (organist) =

English organist and composer

James Hawkins (1662 – 18 October 1729) was an English organist and composer of church music. He was for many years organist of Ely Cathedral.

== Life ==
Hawkins was a chorister of St John's College, Cambridge, where he graduated Mus. Bac. in 1719. In the same year he dedicated his anthem "Behold, O God, our Defender" (a manuscript in the library of the Royal College of Music), "to the Very Rev. Mr. Tomkinson, and the rest of the great, good, and just nonjurors of St. John's." Hawkins succeeded John Ferrabosco as organist of Ely Cathedral in 1682.

He remained at Ely for forty-six years. During that period he carefully arranged in volumes what fragments remained of the old manuscript choir books of the cathedral, many of which had been destroyed and many damaged in the civil war. With these he bound up in manuscript seventeen services and seventy-five anthems of his own composition. Some doggerel lines by Hawkins in praise of Handel, inscribed on one of two copies of Handel's "Jubilate", illustrate the "cheerfulness" recorded in Hawkins's epitaph. He died on 18 October 1729, in his sixty-seventh year, and was buried "among many of his relations" in the cathedral. Under the same black marble was laid in 1732 his wife Mary, "the tender mother of ten children".

== Compositions ==
Vol. vii. of the music manuscripts in the Ely Cathedral library is lettered "Mr. Hawkins' Church Musick." It contains 532 pages of his compositions. These pieces, with others bound up in various volumes in the same library, comprise: Services in A (two: one in Tudway's Collection); A minor (full score); B minor; B minor (chanting); B flat; C; C minor (chanting, founded on a chant ascribed to William Croft, and generally sung in B minor); D (chanting); E minor (two); E flat (two); G (part of it in Tudway's Collection); F minor; "Burial Service"; "Gloria in excelsis".

Of Hawkins's seventy-five anthems, sketches, and fragments, nine are in the collection of Tudway, who was in correspondence with Hawkins (Harl. MSS. 7341–2).

== Family ==
His son, James Hawkins the younger, was organist of Peterborough Cathedral from 1714 to 1750. Manuscript copies of his anthem "O praise the Lord" are preserved both in Tudway's Collection and at Ely.

Cultural offices
Preceded by John Ferrabosco	Organist and Master of the Choristers of Ely Cathedral; 1682–1729	Succeeded by Thomas Kempton
