= Peter Lupo =

Italian viol player and composer (1535–1608)

Peter Lupo (c. 1535–1608) was an Italian viol player and composer active for 40 years or more at the court of Elizabeth I of England. Born in Venice to Ambrose Lupo and his first wife Lucia, he and his brother Joseph first went to Antwerp, where Peter joined the musicians' guild on 20 August 1557. He married his first wife Katherine Wicke, and had his first child in Antwerp before moving to England, where Ambrose had served in the royal viol consort since 1540. In 1567, Peter succeeded Albert of Venice, another Italian who died on 17 January 1555. Peter Lupo was among the musicians who played at the funeral of Queen Elizabeth in 1603. His nephew Thomas Lupo the elder and son Thomas Lupo the younger also became court musicians. Another son, Philip, moved to Virginia and became the founder of the American branch of the Lupo family. Among Lupo's descendants in the United States was the Sacred Harp composer Sarah Lancaster, whose father was James Lupo Lancaster.

Royal gifts to Peter included "a payr of perfumed gloves" and "v songe books".

== Family tree ==
Jeronimo Bassano
Alvise Bassano	Ambrose	Lucia
Laura Bassano	Joseph	Peter Lupo	Katherine
Thomas	Horatio	Thomas
Theophilus Lupo

== See also ==
- Lupo family
