= Lupo family =

Family of court musicians in England

Lupo Lieupo, Lewpoe, Loopo, Luper, Looper
- Anglo-Italian family
- Current region: United Kingdom; United States (American Southeast; including Virginia, the Carolinas, and Georgia)
- Etymology: Lupo (Italian): (lit. 'Wolf')
- Origin: Milan Venice; London
- Founded: c. 16th century
- Founder: Ambrose Lupo
- Website: lupo.org

The Lupo family (Italian: [ˈluːpo]) also spelled Lieupo, Lewpoe, or Loopo and sometimes fully anglicized to Luper or Looper, is a British and American family of Anglo-Italian descent, descended from prominent court musicians active during the Tudor Period, who originated among Italian Jews in Northern Italy before their establishment in England. Members of the Lupo family were in service of the English monarchy from 1540 until the English Civil War, when the monarchy was abolished. The Lupos are regarded to have brought with them to England both viols and violins, making them among the earliest musicians to adapt to the violin family of instruments. Members of the family immigrated to the Colony of Virginia in the 17th century, with descendants later spreading throughout the American Southeast and United States.

== Etymology ==
The surname Lupo, from the Italian word for "wolf", was sometimes adopted by Jews living in Gentile society. Ambrose Lupo was the first of his family to adopt the surname. It was likely inspired by the Biblical reference, Genesis 49:27: "Benjamin is a ravenous wolf; in the morning he devours the prey; in the evening he divides the plunder." According to Peter Holman, "It must have appealed to [Jewish people] as a suitably ironic name for a persecuted people who were often likened to wolves in the mythology of the time."

== History ==
In 1539, in advance of Henry VIII's marriage to Anne of Cleves, the king instructed his chief minister, Thomas Cromwell, to improve the standard of music at the English royal court. Cromwell used an agent in Venice to recruit musicians from northern Italy. The first group included five brothers of the Bassano family, who were regarded among the leading wind players in Venice. Within a month, the agent had also recruited six viol players, including Ambrose, Alexandro, and Romano of Milan, Alberto and Vincenzo of Venice, and Juan Maria of Cremona. They had arrived in London by 1 November 1540. Ambrose, Alexandro, and Romano of Milan have been identified by some music historians as brothers of Sephardic Jewish origin, descended from families who had left the Iberian Peninsula around the time of the Spanish Inquisition. Jews had been legally excluded from England since the medieval period, making the status of such musicians dependent on their identity as foreign court servants and, in some cases, converts or assimilated Christians.

On 26 April 1542 "ambrosin(o) de myllano" witnessed the will of former court musician John Anthony whose name is recorded in the probate records as "Anthonii Moyses". Two days later, Ambrose's name is recorded as "Ambrosius deolmaleyex" in the probate records, an apparent attempt by an English clerk to render the Jewish name "de Olmaliach" or "de Almaliach" ("Almaliach" being a form of the Sephardic name "Elmaleh"). Documents of State Archive in Venice are giving now evidence that Ambrose was appointed as player of violone "sonadore de lironj (or de lirinj)" at the Scuola Grande of San Marco in Venice from 1542 to 1549. The members of the group he belonged were all from Brescia and Salò in the region of Lombardy. They included:

- Antonio de Bortholomeo da violeta da Salò;
- Bartolomeo, father of Antonio, replaced by Cornelio in 1544.
- Cornelio (who died in Istria in 1550) began playing at the Scuola in 1541. He was the son of Jacomo lauter;
- Antonio caleger (fl. 1536–1549) resident of the Contrada S. Maria Formosa, a shoemaker and player at the Scuola from 1536;
- Batista de Caro da Sallò;
- Battista de (Zan) Maria de Sallò, was replaced by Lorenzo samiter (retailer of silk fabric) in 1544.

Ambrose's two sons, Peter and Joseph, were said to have been born in Venice. They joined the musicians guild in London 17 January 1555 and 20 August 1557. Joseph was appointed to the violin consort by warrant dated 16 November 1563; Peter, 20 September 1567. Ambrose, Peter and Joseph all served as court musicians for at least 40 years.

Joseph's son, Thomas, was appointed to the violin consort by a warrant dated 4 May 1591; Peter's son, Thomas, 17 November 1599.

Ambrose was a paid musician at the coronation of Edward VI, the burial of Henry VIII, and the coronation of Elizabeth I. Joseph, Peter, Thomas Sr. and Thomas Jr. were paid musicians at the funeral of Elizabeth I. Thomas Sr., Thomas Jr. and Horatio were paid musicians at the funeral of James I.

== Coat of arms ==
Ambrose Lupo and his sons, Peter and Joseph, were granted a coat of arms by William Dethick, officer of arms at the College of Arms in London.

== Family tree ==
Jeronimo Bassano
Alvise Bassano	Ambrose (died 1591)	Lucia
Laura Bassano	Joseph	Peter Lupo (1535–1608)	Katherine
Thomas (1571–1627)	Horatio	Thomas
Theophilus Lupo

== See also ==
- Jews in England
- List of musical families (classical music)

== Bibliography ==
- Chandler, B. Glenn. "The Lupo Legacy: Agents for Change." Athens Journal of Humanities & Arts 6, no. 1 (2019): 41–70. PDF. Retrieved 7 July 2026.
- Holman, Peter. Four and Twenty Fiddlers: The Violin at the English Court, 1540–1690 (Oxford University Press, USA, 14 March 1996)
- Pio, Stefano. " Viol and Lute Makers of Venice 1490 -1630" Ed. Venice research 2012. ISBN 978-88-907252-0-3
