= Bassanello =

Late Renaissance family of double-reed woodwind instruments

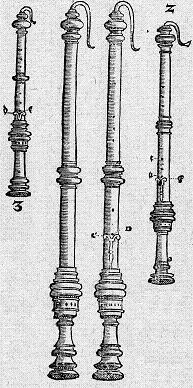
Bassanelli

The bassanello (plural bassanelli) was a Renaissance double reed woodwind instrument which was described in 1619 by Michael Praetorius in his Syntagma Musicum II:

"Bassanelli derive their name from the master who created them, Johann Bassanello, an illustrious Venetian musician and composer. The bore of bassanelli is straight and opens at the bottom; and these instruments only have one key. They are blown by direct contact with the reeds, exactly as are curtals, pommers, and bassets, and are nearly the same as these instruments in timbre, but much softer. The cant, which is the littlest of the bassanelli, is notably excellent to hear on the tenor part in ensembles in which all types and sets of instruments are used, for its tuning is rather accurate, and is similar to flutes in the execution of a tenor part. With good reeds, bassanelli can be made to play rather high. Like shawms, they have seven fingerholes, with a key on the lowest. In the rear, however, there is no hole to be found. They are pitched a fourth lower than chamber pitch, for their lowest size is the bass in F, but in chamber pitch this is understood as the 8 foot C."

Though Praetorius attributes the invention of bassanelli to Johann Bassanello (a.k.a. Giovanni Bassano), it is more likely Giovanni's father Santo who invented them.

As there are no surviving examples of bassanelli, there has been some disagreement concerning its construction, e.g. cylindrical versus conical bore. A comparison of the lengths for the various sizes shown in the scale drawings by Praetorius to the pitches he gave for them, indicates the acoustical properties of a conical bore. The fact that there is no thumbhole (like the shawm) also points to a conical bore instrument that overblows at the octave, with no need to extend the range upward by means of a thumbhole (as is seen on the crumhorn, sordun, and other cylindrical bore reed instruments.) The quiet timbre was apparently produced by a narrow conical bore without a terminal flare.
