= Chromatic Fantasia and Fugue, BWV 903 =

Keyboard work by Johann Sebastian Bach

Chromatic Fantasia and Fugue
- BWV 903
- Keyboard work by J. S. Bach
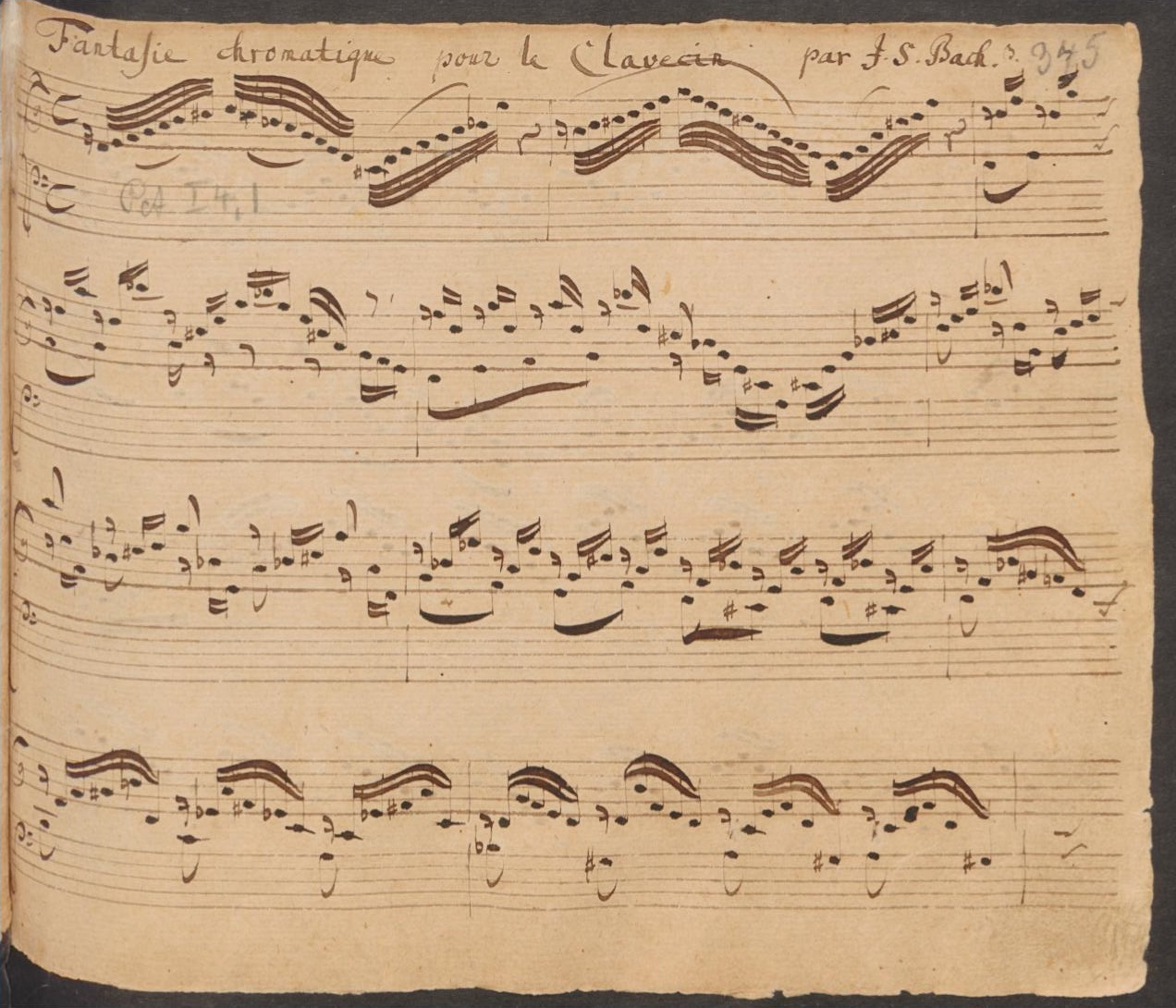
- Opening of the fantasia in a manuscript copy by Johann Tobias Krebs
- Key: D minor
- Composed: c. 1720; revised by the 1730s
- Movements: 2
- Scoring: Keyboard

The Chromatic Fantasia and Fugue in D minor, BWV 903, is a keyboard work by Johann Sebastian Bach. It consists of a fantasia followed by a three-voice fugue. The work is often dated to Bach's Köthen period (1717–1723), although its surviving sources indicate that it circulated in more than one form and was probably revised after Bach moved to Leipzig in 1723.

The fantasia has a complex source history. It survives in three main versions: the early version BWV 903a or BWV 903.1, an intermediate version now numbered BWV 903.2, and the main version BWV 903 or BWV 903.3. The fugue has a simpler source history and differs only slightly among the surviving sources.

The fantasia is organized through passagework, arpeggiation, chromatic voice leading, and recitative-like writing. Its main sections include an opening passagework section, an arpeggiated and modulatory passage, a recitative, and a coda over a tonic pedal point. The fugue is in three voices and develops a chromatic subject through eleven entries. Although the two movements differ in form, commentators have described continuities between them, especially in chromatic procedure, tonal instability, and keyboard figuration.

The Chromatic Fantasia and Fugue was admired by early writers on Bach, became prominent in nineteenth-century Bach performance and editing, and has been transcribed for several instruments.

== Sources and versions ==
The surviving sources of the Chromatic Fantasia and Fugue do not preserve a single fixed version of the fantasia. Hans David attempted to arrange the manuscripts and early prints then known in a source stemma. George B. Stauffer argues that the larger number of known sources makes such a complete reconstruction uncertain. The manuscript dates are also difficult to use as evidence for the work's chronology, since a later copy may preserve an earlier version. Stauffer notes that only a small number of surviving manuscripts appear to have originated during Bach's lifetime, and that the only precisely dated early manuscript of the mature version is the anonymous P 421, dated 6 December 1730.

Stauffer and Uwe Wolf both describe three versions of the fantasia. The first is the early version, BWV 903a; the second is an intermediate version preserved in copies associated with Johann Tobias Krebs the Elder and Samuel Gottlieb Heder; and the third is the main version, first represented by an anonymous manuscript dated 1730. In the third edition of the Bach-Werke-Verzeichnis, these versions are numbered BWV 903.1, BWV 903.2, and BWV 903.3, respectively. The fugue has a simpler source history than the fantasia: it appears to have been largely complete from the beginning, apart from later changes in detail, and differs only slightly among the surviving sources.

Principal versions and sources of the fantasia
Version	BWV number	Principal source or witness	Date or dating	Notes
Early version	BWV 903a; BWV 903.1	Darmstadt Mus. MS 69; a now-lost copy used for early printed editions	Surviving Darmstadt copy dated by watermarks to 1731–1735	First twenty-three bars differ from both later versions; includes the low AA absent from the main version.
Intermediate version	BWV 903.2	Krebs and Heder copies in Berlin, DSB, P 803	Date uncertain; the Krebs copy may date from Krebs's years of study with Bach	Opening reworked into substantially the later form; bars 21–24 differ from the main version.
Main version	BWV 903; BWV 903.3	Anonymous manuscript P 421; later Agricola copy	P 421 dated 6 December 1730; Agricola copy dated in or around 1740	Bars 21–24 combine material from BWV 903a with the revised P 803 version; the Agricola copy is the principal source for the main text in Wolf's edition.

=== Early version, BWV 903a / BWV 903.1 ===
The early version of the fantasia, BWV 903a or BWV 903.1, is preserved in Darmstadt Mus. MS 69. A now-lost copy also transmitted this version and supplied the version used in the Bach-Gesellschaft edition and other early printed editions. The Darmstadt manuscript itself was copied by an anonymous scribe active at the Darmstadt court. Its watermarks occur in Darmstadt manuscripts dating from March 1731 to January 1735. These dates apply to the surviving copy, not necessarily to the version it preserves.

Stauffer treats BWV 903a as the earliest version of the fantasia. Its first twenty-three bars differ from both later forms of BWV 903. The opening uses continuous triplets from bar 3 to bar 20, where they change into thirty-second notes leading to the cadence at bar 20.

BWV 903a also uses the low note AA (Note: Helmholtz pitch notation; equivalent to A_{1} in scientific pitch notation) at the end of the opening passage. In the main version, Bach omits this note and ends the introductory section four octaves higher. Stauffer argues that the low AA may point to an extended-range keyboard instrument that was available when the early version was composed, but no longer available when Bach revised the fantasia.

Stauffer connects this hypothesis with the extended-range two-manual harpsichord made by Michael Mietke for the Köthen court in 1719. Surviving Mietke harpsichords from Charlottenburg Palace have unusually deep bass ranges, but they do not include the d‴ (Note: D_{6} in scientific pitch notation) required by BWV 903a. The Köthen instrument is therefore a possible, but unproved, explanation for the unusual range of the early version.

On the basis of the notation and musical style, Stauffer suggests that BWV 903a originated in Köthen around 1720 and was revised later in Leipzig, perhaps around 1729. Richard D. P. Jones also places the early version in the Köthen period.

=== Intermediate version, BWV 903.2 ===
The intermediate version, BWV 903.2, is preserved in the Krebs and Heder copies in Berlin, DSB, P 803. In these copies, the opening of the fantasia has been reworked into substantially the form known today. Wolf raises the possibility that the Krebs copy dates from Krebs's years of study with Bach, between 1714 and 1717; Jones, however, treats the date of the intermediate version as uncertain.

The main difference between the intermediate and main versions is the passage corresponding to bars 21–24 of the modern printed score. In P 803, this passage appears as a shorter, two-bar variant. Wolf also identifies the transition after the opening section as the point where the intermediate and main versions differ most clearly.

=== Main version, BWV 903 / BWV 903.3 ===
The main version, BWV 903 or BWV 903.3, is first represented by the anonymous manuscript P 421, dated 6 December 1730. In this version, bars 21–24 combine material from BWV 903a with the revised P 803 version. Stauffer treats this change as probably Bach's last major revision of the work. The Chromatic Fantasia and Fugue was transmitted mainly in this third form in later manuscripts.

A copy made by Bach's pupil Johann Friedrich Agricola, dated in or around 1740, is the principal source for the main version in Wolf's edition. Jones describes the Agricola copy as representing the final version and dates the copy to 1738–1741.

After this revision, the general shape of the fantasia remained stable, but many details continued to vary. Stauffer gives several possible explanations: Bach may have owned more than one autograph with slightly different readings; he may have passed on revisions orally as students copied the work; or later copyists and pupils may have introduced variants. Because few pre-1750 sources survive, Stauffer concludes that these possibilities cannot be securely distinguished.

A further source group is associated with Bach's pupil Johann Christian Kittel. Kittel's manuscript is no longer extant, but its readings are known indirectly through copies made from it and through nineteenth-century accounts.

== Structure ==
Chromatic Fantasia and Fugue in D minor, BWV 903, digital performance by Kevin MacLeod
I. Fantasia
Digital performance of the fantasia

II. Fugue
Digital performance of the fugue

The work consists of a fantasia followed by a three-voice fugue. The fantasia is organized through passagework, arpeggiation, chromatic voice leading, and recitative-like writing; the fugue is organized through repeated entries of a chromatic subject and varied episodes. Several commentators treat the fantasia and fugue as different in form while also noting continuities between them, especially in chromatic procedure, tonal instability, and keyboard figuration.

=== Fantasia ===
Analysts divide the fantasia in related but not identical ways. Heinrich Schenker describes the fantasia as having two principal parts of comparable weight: a prelude-like first part in bars 1–49 and a recitative-like second part in bars 49–79. David Schulenberg also distinguishes a prelude and a recitative, while noting that each section borrows to some degree from the style of the other. In Schulenberg's account, the first half moves comparatively directly to the dominant at bar 49, while the second half returns to the tonic only after remote modulations. Richard D. P. Jones gives a more detailed four-part division: an opening passagework section ending with a half close in the tonic at bar 20; a second paragraph, bars 21–49, in which arpeggiated chords alternate with further passagework; an instrumental recitative, bars 49–74; and a coda from bar 75.

Formal outline of the fantasia
Bars	Description	Principal points	Source
1–20	Opening passagework	Athematic figuration; rhythmic patterning; half close in D minor	
21–49	Arpeggiated and modulatory passage	Alternation of arpeggiated chords and passagework; movement to the dominant	
49–74	Recitative	Remote modulations; concealed chromatic descent; return toward D minor	
75–79	Closing tonic pedal	Chromatic descent over tonic pedal; prolonged cadential close	

==== Opening passagework, bars 1–20 ====
The opening part of the fantasia is not built around a recurring theme in the manner of the fugue. Jones describes the fantasia as "quite athematic" and notes that in some earlier free keyboard pieces Bach introduced more definite thematic material as a counterweight to improvisatory freedom. Joseph Kerman describes the opening as organized by rhythmic patterns rather than by free rhythmic disorder. In Kerman's account, after the two opening gestures, the passagework of bars 3–20 is shaped by patterns of three, five, six, and twelve sixteenth notes. Kerman also notes that Schenker's written-out arpeggio realizations for the later shorthand chords continue the same principle: notation is used to suggest a varied performance rather than a mechanically regular one.

Schenker contrasts the standard version of the opening with the early version, BWV 903a. In his discussion of bars 3–4, Schenker states that the early version is comparatively repetitive in its figuration, while the standard version avoids literal repetition through small alterations that introduce contrast and variety. For Schenker, the alteration at bar 4 is significant because it marks a departure from a more uniform figural pattern and helps define the later version's treatment of variation within passagework.

Despite the rapid figuration, Schenker emphasizes the tonal control of the first part. Schenker notes that within bars 1–49 Bach reaches the dominant of D minor seven times, in bars 4, 6, 8, 29, 30, 41, and 49. In Schenker's reading, these dominant arrivals divide the section and help preserve the main key amid the passagework and arpeggiation. Schulenberg makes a related point through voice leading. Schulenberg argues that ordinary harmonic labels are less useful here than an understanding of which notes function as chord tones and which function as anticipations, passing tones, suspensions, or similar embellishing tones. His bass-line sketch for bars 1–49 treats the chromatic surface as an elaboration of underlying bass and voice-leading patterns. In that analysis, the sonorities that resemble augmented-sixth chords in bars 7, 9, and 11, together with the C-minor harmony at bar 12, arise through related chromatic voice leading.

Compared with later parts of the fantasia, the opening paragraph remains closer to D minor, although chromatic writing is already present. Jones treats bars 1–20 as an extended passagework section ending with a half close in D minor. Schulenberg describes the first half of the fantasia as an arpeggiated prelude whose figuration ranges from regular broken-chord sequences to freer cadenzas. Schulenberg singles out the C-minor harmony at bar 12 as a temporary displacement into a remote flat-side area that foreshadows later movement to remote tonal regions. Schenker identifies the C–E♭–G harmony at bar 12 as an unusual sonority that is absorbed into the broader motion toward the dominant of D minor.

==== Arpeggiated and modulatory passage, bars 21–49 ====
The second paragraph, bars 21–49, introduces larger arpeggiated spans. Jones describes bars 21–49 as a section in which arpeggiated chords alternate with passagework. Schenker treats the arpeggiated passages as governed by voice leading, not merely as keyboard display. In his discussion of the passage beginning at bar 27, Schenker argues that arpeggiation should not be realized mechanically as simple ascent and descent through chord tones. Instead, Schenker treats Bach's written-out arpeggio practice as evidence that passing tones, acciaccaturas, changes of direction, and registral choices can serve voice-leading purposes.

The arpeggio section beginning at bar 33 introduces more remote tonal motion. Schenker emphasizes the harmonic connection between the first chord of bar 33 and the chord at bar 30, with bars 31–32 functioning as intervening composed-out material. Schenker summarizes the harmonic motion of bars 33–42 as passing through D, B♭, E, A, F, D, E, A, and B♭. Schulenberg also treats bar 33 as a structural turning point. In Schulenberg's account, the steady bass descent from D to A that had governed the opening gives way at bar 33 to more irregular voice leading, including diminished fourths and other intervals that do not fit a simple linear reduction. Schulenberg reads the passage as pointing first toward G minor at bar 33, then toward E minor at bar 34, and then toward B♭ minor at bar 38. The only sustained modulation in bars 33–45, according to Schulenberg, is the move at bar 45 to A minor, the minor dominant.

==== Recitative, bars 49–74 ====
The recitative begins at bar 49. Schenker gives a harmonic outline for bars 49–70 in which the dominant of D minor is followed by a succession of motions by third with chromatic alteration: A to D♯, then F to G♭, E♭ to F♭/E, C♯ to B/E, and G♯ to C♯, before the return toward D minor through A–D–G and the approach to cadence. In his broader tonal description, Schenker treats bars 50–62 as brief departures from the main key, followed by the return of D minor from bar 62: A, the dominant, is heard in bar 62; D minor follows at bar 63 with a chromatically raised third; the tonic degree is retained until bar 68; IV appears at bar 68; a regular half cadence follows at bar 70; and a full cadence arrives at bar 74.

Schenker also identifies a concealed melodic line running through much of the recitative. Schenker reads this line as a chromatic descent through an octave beginning on B♭. The line is most clearly heard, in Schenker's account, in the eighth notes associated with the chords that begin and end individual recitative statements. Kerman approaches the recitative through phrase structure. Kerman describes the recitative as built from repeated short, slow figures, mostly upbeat–downbeat units: the downbeats usually descend by step, while the upbeats are varied by shorter note-patterns. Kerman counts about eleven such figures in the twenty-five bars of the recitative proper and eight more in the closing passage over the tonic pedal.

Bars 56–57 of the fantasia, from the recitative section. The passage illustrates the section's chromatic writing and its short recitative-like figures articulated by chords.

The enharmonic notation at bar 50 is central to both Schenker's and Schulenberg's accounts. Schenker argues that the succession B♭–A in bars 49–50 belongs to the chord A–C–E♭–G♭, understood as the seventh degree in B♭ major/minor. In Schenker's reading, Bach moves from the A–C♯–E chord in bar 49 to D–F♯–A, then extends that harmony to include E♭ and respells F♯ as G♭, thereby preparing F as the dominant of B♭. Schulenberg describes the same passage as more coherent than the notation may first suggest: the dominant chord tonicizing D♭ in bar 50 is enharmonically equivalent to the one tonicizing C♯ minor in bar 61, and the intervening passage is essentially a sequence over a descending bass. Schulenberg therefore reads the opening of the recitative as a digression in C♯ minor, or iii of the dominant, a remote relation to D minor. Jones similarly emphasizes that the recitative moves to the outer limits of the tonal system and back while remaining organized by planned harmonic motion.

==== Coda, bars 75–79 ====
The coda begins at bar 75 over a tonic pedal. Schenker describes bars 75–79 as a chain of diminished seventh chords descending by semitone, interrupted at three points by simple triads on IV, I, and IV. In Schenker's account, these triads lead to the final dominant–tonic close. Jones emphasizes that the coda is both highly chromatic and supported by the tonic: the treble descends chromatically through an octave, the accompanying chords also descend chromatically, and the coda is supported by the tonic pedal. Schulenberg likewise describes the coda as a chromatic descent through a full octave over a tonic pedal, with an underlying gesture that functions as a prolonged plagal cadence. Schenker also treats the figuration of bars 76–79 as ordered in stages: the underlying arpeggiations begin with five ascending figures, change type at the sixth, and then move toward a more fully elaborated close.

=== Fugue ===
The fugue is in three voices and has eleven subject entries. Schenker gives the entries as follows:

Entry	Type	Key	Bar	Voice
1	Subject	D minor	1	Upper
2	Answer	A minor	9	Middle
3	Subject	D minor	19	Lower
4	Subject	A minor	42	Middle
5	Subject	D minor	60	Middle
6	Answer	B minor	76	Lower
7	Subject	E minor	90	Upper
8	Answer	D minor	107	Middle
9	Subject	G minor	131	Middle
10	Subject	D minor	140	Lower
11	Subject	D minor	154	Upper

Kerman likewise states that the eight-bar subject appears eleven times in a 161-bar fugue. Schenker warns against treating the three keyboard lines as if they were fixed vocal parts such as soprano, alto, tenor, and bass; for an instrumental fugue, Schenker instead refers to the lines as upper, middle, and lower voices.

Schenker divides the fugue into three large sections. The first section is the exposition, comprising the first three entries: subject, answer, subject, in D minor, A minor, and D minor. It ends with a cadence to F major at bar 35. Bars 35–41 form an episode leading to the second section. The second section begins with the fourth and fifth entries in A minor and D minor, then moves to the more distant sixth and seventh entries in B minor and E minor. Schenker treats the B-minor and E-minor entries as consistent with the middle section's modulatory function. Schenker regards the beginning of the third section as open to question, but prefers to begin the third section with the eighth entry at bar 107. The third section therefore includes the eighth through eleventh entries. Schenker explains this grouping through the relation of their keys: the G-minor ninth entry functions as a subdominant midpoint between D-minor entries and is then absorbed into the movement toward the final D-minor close.

Jones describes the fugue as more formally defined than the fantasia. In Jones's account, the fugue has a clearly articulated subject, a sequential headmotive, an inversion halfway through the subject, a regular countersubject, a reprise element associated with concerto form, and a modulatory phase divided into sharp-side and flat-side regions. Schulenberg also emphasizes the tonal plan of the fugue. Schulenberg argues that if the fugue is called chromatic, the reason is not only the subject, since Bach wrote other fugues on chromatic subjects, but rather the fugue's movement to tonalities not normally expected in D minor, especially B minor and E minor. He locates these remote minor keys near the centre of the fugue, around bars 83–97.

==== Subject and answer ====
The subject begins on the dominant rather than the tonic. Schenker reads the subject's chromaticism as grounded in a composed-out D-minor harmony: by taking the first quarter note of bar 1 and adding the first quarter notes of bars 4, 6, 7, and 8, Schenker obtains the descent A–G–F–E–D. In Schenker's reading, the subject's apparently diffuse chromaticism is therefore rooted in the D-minor chord. Schenker also notes that the subject begins on the dominant so that the subject can close on the tonic. Kerman accepts the importance of Schenker's analytical reduction of the subject but argues that it does not account for the subject's dynamic process. In Kerman's reading, the subject's main issue is not the amount of chromaticism but its tonal ambiguity. Heard by itself, the opening A–C suggests A minor rather than D minor; E–G in bars 3–4 then suggests E minor, the dominant of the dominant; the B♭ at bar 5 cancels that sharp-side implication and turns the subject back toward a D-minor cadence.

Subject of the fugue

Kerman identifies the B♭ at bar 5 as the subject's melodic and structural crux. In later entries, Kerman argues, this point generates unusual canonic writing, helps trigger the breakdown of contrapuntal texture into thick chords, and supplies the basis for the large sequence in bars 135–140. Kerman also assigns rhythmic importance to this point: with the help of the dissonant trill in the countersubject beginning at bar 13, the corresponding bar can take on the force of a downbeat against the usual accentual pattern.

The answer at bar 9 raises the question of whether the answer should be tonal or real. Schenker explains that, since the subject begins on the dominant, the subject calls for a tonal answer beginning on the tonic; at the same time, the subject's shape calls for a real answer preserving the intervallic relation, so that A would be answered by E, the dominant of A minor. Schenker reads Bach's solution as a compression of both possibilities: the answer begins with D but also includes E within the same quarter-note span through the dotted rhythm. Jones likewise treats the answer as formally important, noting the unprepared seventh at the answering entry in bar 9 and the inexact dotted opening rhythm, which later becomes the basis of an episodic sequence in bars 72–75. Schulenberg describes the same answer as replacing the original half-step A–B♭ with D–F, while E functions as a passing tone.

==== Exposition and first episodes, bars 1–41 ====
The exposition comprises the first three entries. At bar 1, the upper voice presents the subject in D minor. At bar 9, the middle voice gives the answer in A minor, while the upper voice continues with the first countersubject. Schenker treats bar 8, between the first subject and the answer, as an insertion required by contrapuntal and registral considerations: the first subject ends on D, the answer begins on D, and the upper voice must rise above the answer to function as counterpoint. Schenker adds that Bach gives this necessary insertion a role in the first countersubject by making its figure the basis of that countersubject.

The first episode, bars 16–18, is based on the principal motive of the first countersubject. At the third entry, bars 19–26, the lower voice states the subject in D minor; the middle voice adheres to the first countersubject, and the upper voice introduces the second countersubject. The second episode, bars 26–41, modulates to F major, articulates the cadence, and prepares the second section. In Schenker's account, the length of the second episode separates the fourth entry from the third and prevents the fourth entry from sounding like an extra exposition entry. The second episode uses material derived from the first countersubject, and Schenker identifies a bass motion by fifths through the opening notes of successive bars, E–A–D–G–C.

==== Middle section and remote entries, bars 42–106 ====
The fourth entry begins at bar 42 in A minor, in the middle voice. Schenker notes that the fourth entry is the first entry in which Bach varies the original form of the subject: the quarter notes corresponding to bars 5–6 of the theme appear in diminution as eighth notes. Kerman treats the fourth entry as the start of a purposeful process in which the subject is gradually altered. In Kerman's reading, the melodic peak is softened by appoggiatura eighth notes, and the cadence of the original subject is obscured.

The third episode, bars 49–59, includes new material. Schenker reads bars 57–59 through a larger A–C–E triad, within which the bass motion on each eighth note expresses smaller chordal fragments. Kerman describes the third episode as a composite of two contrasting ideas: arpeggiated chords and continuous sixteenth-note figuration doubled in thirds or sixths.

The fifth entry begins at bar 60 in D minor. Schenker observes that the fifth entry varies the theme more extensively than the fourth entry: the final bars of the subject are omitted, and the fifth and sixth bars of the theme are repeated in bars 66–67 in another voice. Schenker compares this internal repetition to a technique more typical of homophonic continuity than of strict fugue. Kerman reads the fifth entry as altered in rhythm and harmony: the bass A at bar 60 shifts the accent from the subject's second bar to its first and makes the tonic entry less clear by emphasizing the dominant.

The fourth episode, bars 68–75, prepares a half cadence on the dominant of D minor. Schenker treats bars 72–75 as a foreshadowing of the answer at bar 76. In Schenker's preferred reading, bar 72 begins with C♮ rather than C♯, so that bars 72–73, bars 74–75, and bars 76–77 present related forms of the same figure, moving from simpler to more complex harmonic settings. Kerman describes bars 72–75 as resembling a false stretto before the sixth entry, with a touch of diminution that helps destabilize the sixth entry.

The sixth entry begins at bar 76, where the answer appears in B minor in the lower voice. Schenker notes that bars 5–7 of the subject, corresponding here to bars 80–82, are again fragmented through diminution, but differently from the diminutions in the fourth and fifth entries. Schenker also observes that the countersubjects are new, with only a trace of the first countersubject in bar 81. Kerman treats the sixth entry as another stage in the weakening of the subject's original shape: the entry is not strongly launched, its opening contour is blurred, and the sixth entry ends with a cadence in the remote key of B minor.

The fifth episode, bars 83–89, is based on material from the first countersubject. Schenker identifies bars 83–86, including the bass figures in bars 85–86, as derived from that countersubject. At bar 85, Schenker insists on G♯ rather than G♮, explaining the note as part of the chord E–G♯–B and as required by a chromatic line extending through bars 84–89.

The seventh entry begins at bar 90 in E minor, in the upper voice. Schenker identifies a new countersubject in the middle voice and relates its sixteenth-note motion to the preceding episode. Schenker treats bar 94 as a prepared expansion of the three-voice texture into a denser sonority: the uninterrupted sixteenth notes in bars 87–93, the pedal beginning at bar 90, and the deletion of the last eighth note in the fourth bar of the subject all prepare the increase in density. Jones similarly singles out the E-minor entry at bar 90, where the three-part fugal texture expands at bar 94 into an eight-part dominant-ninth chord; Jones notes that this sonority recurs climactically in bars 135–139 and 158. Kerman reads the passage as a climactic breakdown of subject, countersubject, harmony, and counterpoint.

The sixth episode, bars 97–106, follows the E-minor entry. Schenker compares the sixth episode with the fourth episode. Kerman describes the sixth episode as a return of the arpeggiated texture associated with earlier episodes, serving to reduce the tension after the distant E-minor climax.

==== Return and closing section, bars 107–161 ====
The eighth entry begins at bar 107 in D minor, with the answer in the middle voice. Schenker notes that the subject is stated only as far as its sixth measure and that the fifth and sixth measures are repeated, as in the fifth entry. Schenker identifies several further changes in the eighth entry: the leap of a sixth in the second measure is composed out, the third measure uses a dotted rhythm similar to that of the first measure, and the same dotted rhythm replaces the two eighth notes in the third quarter of the fourth measure. The seventh episode, bars 115–130, combines previously heard material with new material in bars 118–125. Schenker notes the two-voice texture in bars 120–121 and identifies a chromatic descent in the middle voice in bars 126–130. Kerman treats bars 115–130 as a relatively long passage centered on D minor and leading toward the final climax.

The ninth entry begins at bar 131 in G minor. Schenker stresses that the subject appears in the middle voice for four measures, after which its fifth and sixth measures are transferred to the upper voice. Schenker explains this through exchange of voices. As in earlier shortened entries, the remaining bars of the subject are replaced by repetition of its fifth and sixth measures; in the ninth entry, however, the repeated material also modulates first to D minor at bar 137 and then to A minor within bar 139. Schenker therefore treats the repeated material as also forming the eighth episode. Kerman interprets the G-minor entry as a subdominant event that does not provide closure by itself. In Kerman's account, Bach uses the subject's crux and its associated marching figure, intensifies it with thick chords, and sequences it from the subdominant past the tonic toward the dominant, producing dominant-ninth sonorities at bars 135 and 139.

The tenth entry begins at bar 140 with the subject in D minor in the lower voice. Kerman reads the tenth entry as the lowest bass entry, placed immediately after the large climactic sequence and coordinated with the pedal that began at bar 132. The ninth episode begins at bar 147 and recalls material from bars 118ff.

The eleventh and final entry begins at bar 154, with the subject in D minor in the upper voice. Schenker notes the high register of the final entry and its contrast with the preceding low-register entry. Schenker also observes that, although the subject is stated only through its sixth measure, the second eighth note of the third quarter in the fourth measure of the subject is restored here, unlike in the earlier climactic entries, because the closing section requires a more intact restatement of the theme. Kerman describes the final entry as answering the preceding bass entry, with left-hand octaves below in bars 154–160; Kerman also treats the closing flourish as emphasizing the original rhythmic endpoint of the subject. Schenker adds that the free ending in bar 160 is still based on the closing notes of the subject.

Schenker summarizes the fugue as a flexible application of fugal procedure. In Schenker's view, the first part establishes the subject and answer without alteration; later parts vary, abbreviate, embellish, or repeat the subject once its basic shape has been made clear. Schenker also argues that the episodes retain their freedom while being balanced with the entries, that the chosen three-voice texture is sometimes reduced or expanded, and that the first countersubject is followed flexibly rather than mechanically. Kerman makes a related but differently framed point: the fugue uses no major contrapuntal devices such as stretto, inversion, or thematic combination, and even the countersubject appears irregularly; the structure of the fugue depends instead on the subject, its variants, its tonal implications, its episodes, and the gradual buildup of texture toward climaxes.

=== Relationship between the fantasia and fugue ===
The formal relation between the fantasia and fugue has been described in different ways. Jones presents the fugue partly as a structural counterpart to the fantasia. Since the fantasia is largely athematic, the fugue supplies the definite thematic organization that the fantasia avoids, whether or not the fugue was part of the original conception. Jones contrasts the fantasia's free, pseudo-improvisatory writing with the fugue's articulated subject, countersubject, reprise elements, and organized modulatory regions.

Jones also emphasizes continuity between the fantasia and fugue. The fugue's chromatic sequential headmotive, the tonal instability of the subject before its midpoint, the unprepared seventh at the first answer in bar 9, the inexact dotted answer, the later episodic use of that dotted rhythm in bars 72–75, and the eight-part dominant-ninth chord at bar 94 all make the fugue a continuation of the fantasia's chromatic and improvisatory procedures.

Kerman similarly rejects the view that the fugue is merely a purely strict counterpart to the fantasia. Kerman argues that the steady motion of the fugue provides a large-scale rhythmic resolution to the irregular starts and stops of the fantasia, but he also describes the fugue as preserving an improvisatory quality through radical modulations, free figuration, instability of subject and countersubject, and homophonic outbursts. For Kerman, Bach translates some of the fantasia's freedom into fugal texture rather than simply opposing it.

Schulenberg links the fantasia and fugue through tonal design. Schulenberg treats the fugue's remote B-minor and E-minor regions as analogous to the fantasia's movement beyond the ordinary tonal range of D minor. For Schulenberg, the fugue's chromatic character is justified less by the chromatic subject alone than by its movement to tonalities not normally encountered in D minor. This agrees broadly with Jones's and Kerman's view that the fugue continues important formal and tonal features of the fantasia, while retaining the distinct procedures of fugal writing.

== Reception and interpretation ==
The virtuosic and improvisational toccata style of the fantasy, in which both hands alternate rapidly, and the expressive, tonally experimental youthful character, combined with the cogent structure of Bach's more mature period, make the work exceptional, and it has been particularly popular among Bach's keyboard works. This assessment was shared by Bach's contemporaries. The first biographer of Bach, Johann Nikolaus Forkel, wrote: "I have expended much effort to find another piece of this type by Bach. But it was in vain. This fantasy is unique and has always been second to none."

19th-century interpretations of the piece are exemplars of the romantic approach to Bach's works taken during that period. Felix Mendelssohn, the founder of the Bach revival, played this fantasy in February 1840 and 1841 in a series of concerts at the Leipzig Gewandhaus and delighted the audience. He attributed this effect to the free interpretation of the fantasy's arpeggios. He used the sound effects of the era's grand piano through differentiated dynamics, accentuating high notes and doubling pedal bass notes. This interpretation became the model for the adagio of Mendelssohn's second sonata for cello and Piano (Op. 58), written from 1841 to 1843. This work gives the top notes of the piano arpeggios a chorale melody while the cello plays an extended recitative resembling that of the Chromatic Fantasia and quotes its final passage.

This romantic interpretation was formative; many famous pianists and composers, including Franz Liszt and Johannes Brahms, used the work as a demonstration of virtuosity and expressiveness in their concert repertoire. It was reprinted in many editions with interpretive notes and scale instructions. Max Reger reworked the piece for the organ. Even since the rise of the historically informed performance movement, it remains one of the most popular keyboard works by Bach.

There are romantic interpretations by Edwin Fischer, Wilhelm Kempff, Samuil Feinberg and Alfred Brendel on the grand piano, and by Wanda Landowska on the harpsichord. A non-romantic interpretation with surprising accents and without pedalling was presented by Glenn Gould and influenced more recent pianists such as András Schiff and Alexis Weissenberg. The pianist Agi Jambor combined romantic sonorities and colors with clear voice guidance and emphasized the work's structural relations. Around 1944, Kaikhosru Shapurji Sorabji composed a virtuosic paraphrase of the fantasy as the 99th of his 100 Transcendental Studies.

== Transcriptions ==
The work was transcribed for solo viola by Zoltán Kodály in 1950. There is a transcription for classical guitar by Philip Hii, and Busoni made two transcriptions for both solo piano and cello and piano, which are catalogued as BV B 31 and 38, respectively. Jaco Pastorius played the opening parts on electric bass on his 1981 album Word of Mouth. Organist-composer Rachel Laurin made a transcription for solo organ in 1996, which she later recorded. The Pro Organo label will reissue her recording in 2026 as a digital release, and her transcription will be published by Leupold Editions. A transcription for solo cello was made by cellist Johann Sebastian Paetsch in 2015 and published by the Hofmeister Musikverlag in Leipzig. A transcription for solo clarinet of the fantasy was done by Stanley Hasty, professor emeritus of University of Rochester's Eastman School of Music, in 2002. A transcription of the Chromatic Fantasia for solo B♭ clarinet, and fugue in D minor for 3 clarinets (two B♭ clarinets and B♭ bass clarinet) was made by clarinetist Richard Stoltzman in 2011 and published by Lauren Keiser Music.

== See also ==
- Chromatic fantasia – keyboard genre associated with chromatic writing
