= William Cranford =

William Cranford was an English composer of consort music for viols. His works include fantasias, variations, and a virtuosic.

Before the British Interregnum, Cranford, who also was a singer, was a lay vicar-choral at St Paul's Cathedral in London.

Selected works by Cranford have been edited by Virginia Brookes published by the now-defunct PRB Productions. His works are among the holdings of Marsh's Library in Dublin.
