= Ambrose Lupo =

British musician and composer (died 1591)

Ambrose, Ambrosius or Ambrosio Lupo (died 10 February 1591) was a court musician and composer to the English court from the time of Henry VIII to that of Elizabeth I, and the first of a dynasty of such court musicians. He is thought to have been born in Milan, though he and his family lived in Venice for a while just before being called to England. He and five other viol players, including Alexandro and Romano Lupo, were summoned to England by Henry in November 1540, to bring English music up to speed with music on the continent. Ambrose, also known as 'Lupus Italus' and de Almaliach, was the longest-serving of the group.

Ambroso da Venezia was cited as a music-player of the Queen of England by the testimony of Orazio Cogno before the Venice Inquisition on 27 August 1577 regarding his recent stay in England with Edward de Vere, 17th Earl of Oxford. Cogno stated Ambroso has two children and had married in England, even though, as Cogno stated he has heard, he has a wife living in Venice whom he sends money. He also stated that Ambroso wanted to teach him the doctrine of heretics and to read heretical books.

Living in the parish of St Alphege, Cripplegate, he was granted leases on lands valuing £20 in 1590 (in which document he was described as "one of the eldest of Her Majesty's musicians for the [sic] vials") and on Cissel Gorge in May 1590. He gifted Queen Elizabeth I "a box of Lute strynges" ( a shiny fabric used to make dresses) and "a glas of swette water" (fresh water) on New Years Day 1577/8. He died in London.

== Family tree ==
Jeronimo Bassano
Alvise Bassano | Ambrose | Lucia
Laura Bassano | Joseph | Peter Lupo | Katherine
Thomas | Horatio | Thomas
Theophilus Lupo

== See also ==
- Lupo family
