= Fantasia (musical form) =

Musical interpretation rooted in improvisation

A fantasia (Italian: [fantaˈziːa]; also English: fantasy, fancy, fantazy, phantasy; German: Fantasie, Phantasie; French: fantaisie) is a musical composition with roots in improvisation. The fantasia, like the impromptu, seldom follows the textbook rules of any musical form.

== History ==
The term was first applied to music during the 16th century, at first to refer to the imaginative musical "idea" rather than to a particular compositional genre. Its earliest use as a title was in German keyboard manuscripts from before 1520, and by 1536 is found in printed tablatures from Spain, Italy, Germany, and France. From the outset, the fantasia had the sense of "the play of imaginative invention", particularly in lute or vihuela composers such as Francesco Canova da Milano and Luis de Milán. Its form and style consequently ranges from the freely improvisatory to the strictly contrapuntal, and also encompasses more or less standard sectional forms. One of the most important composers in the development of the fantasia was Jan Pieterszoon Sweelinck. His greatest work in this style is the fantasia cromatica (a specific form called "chromatic fantasia"), which in many ways forms a link between the Renaissance and the Baroque.

== Renaissance and Baroque ==
Elway Bevin (ca.1554-1638) - Fantasia on Browning 3 (ca.1570)

William Byrd (ca.1540-1623) - Fantasia à4, VdGS No.1 from Psalms, Songs & Sonnets (1611)

Alfonso Ferrabosco the Younger (ca.1575-1628) - Fantasia 'On the Hexachord' à4, VdGS No.10 (ca.1630)

Orlando Gibbons (bap.1583-1625) - Fantasia à4, VdGS No.1GB (ca.1630)
Performed by Phillip W. Serna, Treble, Tenor & Bass Viols

According to the Oxford Dictionary of Music, in the 16th century the instrumental fantasia was a strict imitation of the vocal motet. Polyphonic solo fantasias were widely composed for the Lute & early keyboards. Composers such as William Byrd & Orlando Gibbons wrote many surviving keyboard fantasias, while also expanding the genre with outstanding examples for recorders & viols. In addition to Byrd & Gibbons, composers John Coprario, Alfonso Ferrabosco, Thomas Lupo, John Ward, and William White continued to expand the genre for viol consort while examples by William Lawes, John Jenkins, William Cranford, Matthew Locke, and Henry Purcell are regarded as highly exceptional from the late 17th-century.

The form expanded in scope during the Baroque period with works ranging from J. S. Bach's Chromatic Fantasia and Fugue, BWV 903, for harpsichord; Great Fantasia and Fugue in G minor, BWV 542, for organ; and Fantasia and Fugue in C minor, BWV 537, for organ are examples. Georg Philipp Telemann published Twelve Fantasias for Solo Flute in 1733, and Twelve Fantasias for Solo Violin and Twelve Fantasias for Viola da Gamba solo in 1735.

== Classical and Romantic ==
Examples from the Classical period are Mozart's Fantasia in D minor, K. 397 for fortepiano and his Fantasia in C minor, K. 475. Ludwig van Beethoven's 13th and 14th (the famous "Moonlight") Piano Sonatas are both headed with "Sonata quasi una fantasia". Franz Schubert composed the Fantasie in C major nicknamed the Wanderer Fantasy for solo piano and the Fantasia in F minor for piano four hands. Three works by Chopin belong in the genre: The Fantaisie in F minor, Op. 49, the Polonaise-Fantaisie in A♭ major, Op. 61, and the Fantaisie-Impromptu in C♯ minor, Op. posth. 66. The fantasia occupies a central place in Schumann's oeuvre: The great Fantasie in C, Op. 17, and the fantasy pieces Op. 12, 73 and 111. Later examples of fantasias include Anton Bruckner's Fantasia in G major WAB 118 and the Four Fantasias WAB 215, Busoni's Fantasia contrappuntistica, Vaughan Williams' Fantasia on a Theme by Thomas Tallis and Fantasia on Greensleves, and Corigliano's Fantasia on an ostinato.

== 20th century ==
Walter Willson Cobbett, in the opening decades of the 20th century, attempted to revive the fantasia style via a competition, to which works like the Phantasie trios and quartets by William Hurlstone, Armstrong Gibbs, John Ireland, Herbert Howells and Frank Bridge owe their existence, as does Benjamin Britten's Phantasy in F minor for string quintet written in 1932, the year in which he also composed a Phantasy Quartet for oboe and strings.

According to the musicologist Donald Francis Tovey, "the term 'fantasia' would adequately cover all post-classical forms of concerto".

== Notable uses ==
- Dmitri Shostakovich’ Violin Concerto No. 1: First movement (Nocturne)

== See also ==
- Canzona
- Capriccio
- Chorale fantasia
- Chromatic fantasia
- Category:Fantasias (musical form)
- Ricercar
- Tiento
- Voluntary (music)

== Sources ==
- Brett, Philip, Jennifer Doctor, Judith LeGrove, and Paul Banks. 2001. "Britten, (Edward) Benjamin". The New Grove Dictionary of Music and Musicians, second edition, edited by Stanley Sadie and John Tyrrell. London: Macmillan Publishers.
- Field, Christopher D. S. 2001. "Fantasia." The New Grove Dictionary of Music and Musicians, second edition, edited by Stanley Sadie and John Tyrrell. London: Macmillan Publishers.
- Howes, Frank, and Christina Bashford. 2001. "Cobbett, Walter Willson". The New Grove Dictionary of Music and Musicians, second edition, edited by Stanley Sadie and John Tyrrell. London: Macmillan Publishers.
- Jullander, Sverker. 2019. "Fantasia and fantasy: Some Notes on Two Homonymic Genres of German Chorale-Based Organ Music". University of Gothenburg, GUPEA. Accessed 4 September 2026.
- Prout, Ebenezer. 1893. Musical Form. London: Augener, p. 2. Accessed 4 September 2026.
- Kennedy, Michael. 2006. The Oxford Dictionary of Music, second edition, revised, Joyce Bourne, associate editor. Oxford and New York: Oxford University Press.
- Tovey, Donald Francis. 1956. The Forms of Music, with an editorial preface by Hubert J. Foss. London: Oxford University Press; Cleveland: World Publishing Co.; New York: Meridian Books. ISBN 9780529020857.
