= Musica Transalpina =

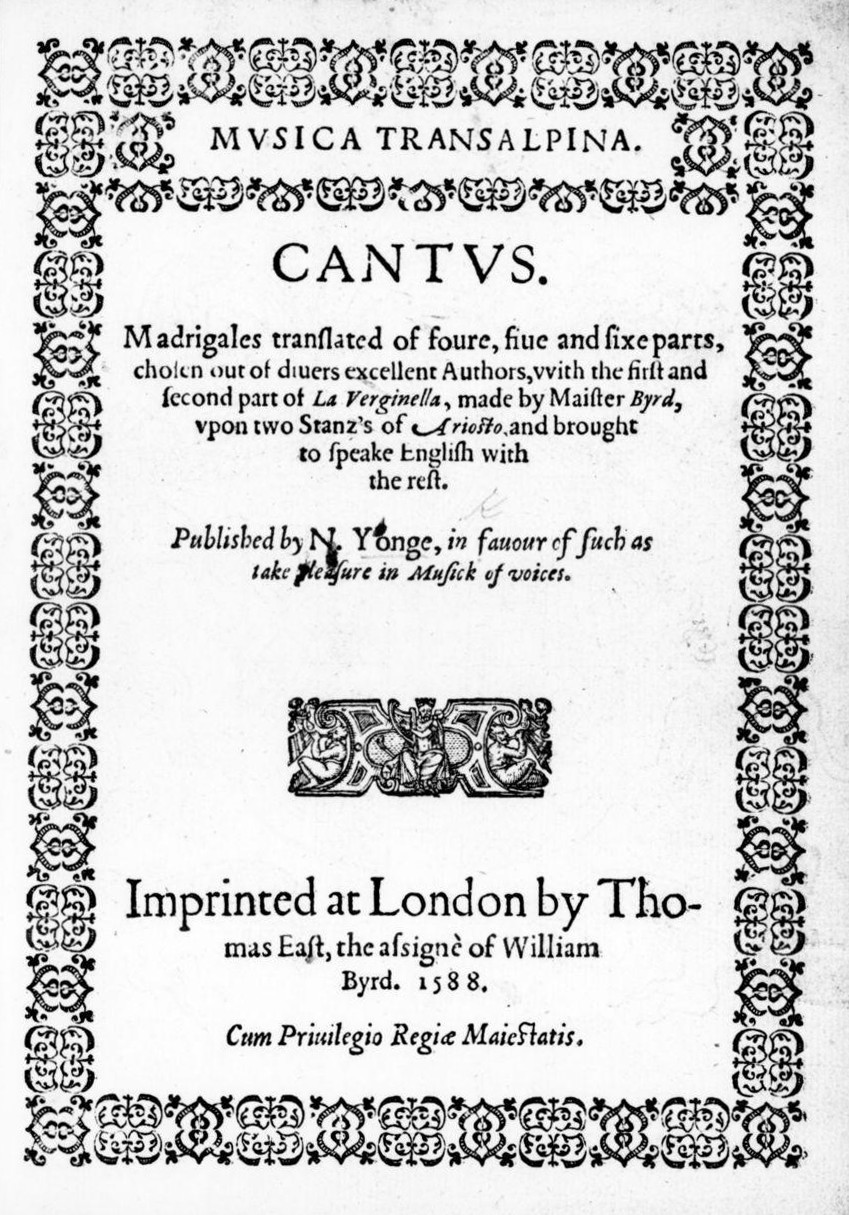
The title-page of one of the partbooks of Musica transalpina, 1588

Musica Transalpina is a collection of madrigals published in England by Nicholas Yonge in 1588. The madrigals had crossed the Alps (hence the name) in the sense that the madrigal form was borrowed from the Italians, and the pieces included in the collection were mainly by Italians. However, the lyrics were rendered into English by Yonge. In a preface Yonge explained that the English had shown interest in Italian madrigals, but for many people the fact that they were in Italian was a barrier to performing them.

It was the first and largest Elizabethan anthology of Italian madrigals. Musica transalpina contains 57 separate pieces by 18 composers, with Alfonso Ferrabosco the elder having the most, and Luca Marenzio second most. Ferrabosco had lived in England in the 1560s and 1570s, which could explain the large number of his compositions in the book; he was relatively unknown in Italy. Works by Giovanni Pierluigi da Palestrina and Orlando di Lasso were also included.

The publication marked the beginning of the golden age of the madrigal in England. English composers were encouraged to produce original madrigals.

== Publication history ==
Musica transalpina was printed by Thomas East (alias Este) and appeared with a dedication to Gilbert Talbot. Several similar anthologies followed immediately after the success of the first, beginning with Thomas Watson's The first sett of Italian Madrigalls Englished, not to the sense of the originall dittie, but after the affection of the Noate, printed in 1590, also by East. As in the earlier collection, the compositions, which were mainly by Marenzio, were provided with English texts, this time by Watson who was not seeking a literal translation.

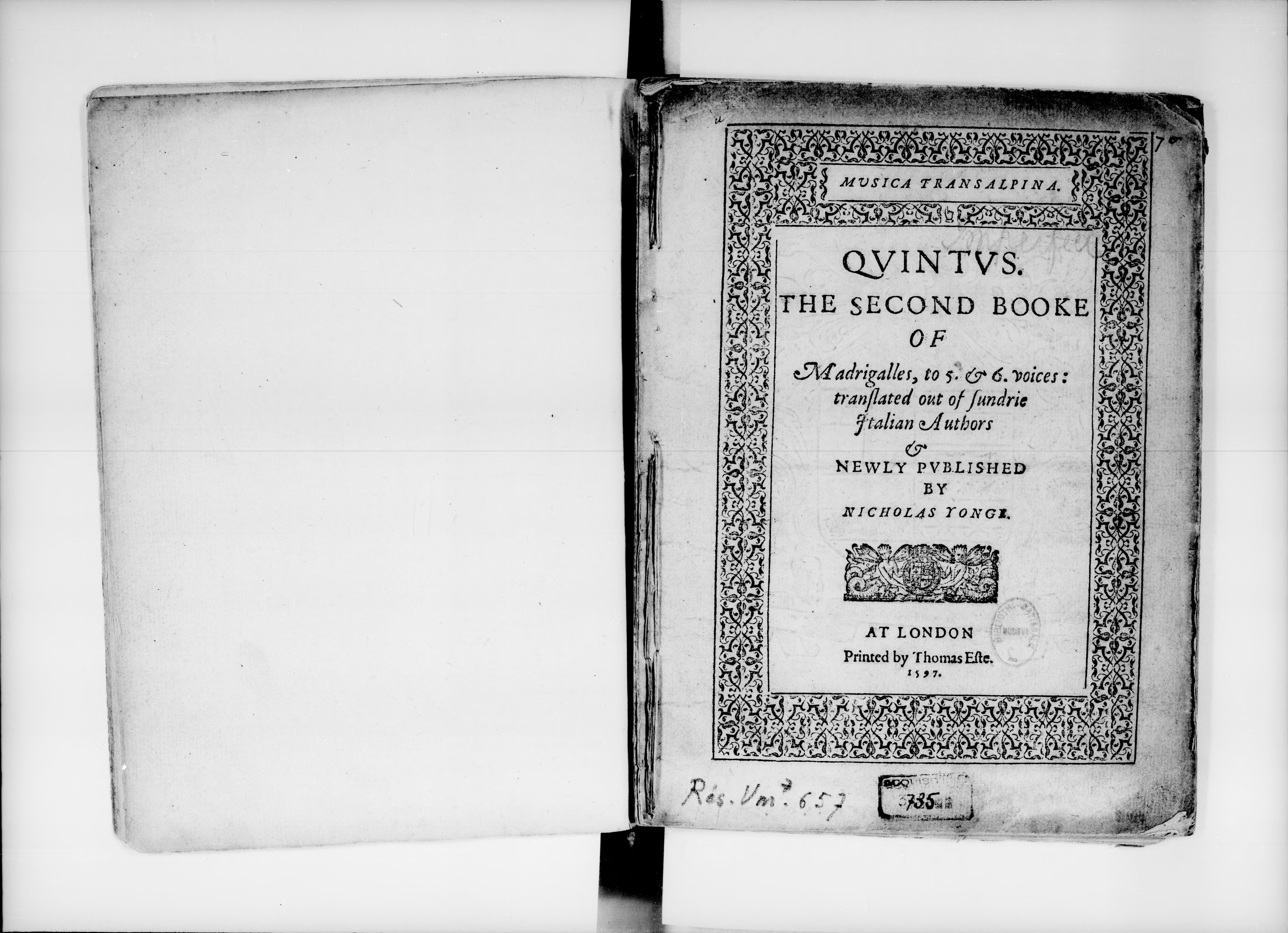
Title page from the second volume of Musica Transalpina

Yonge himself published a second Musica transalpina in 1597, hoping to duplicate the success of the first collection, although it seems that by this time public interest had shifted towards original madrigals by English composers. For example, in 1597 Dowland, an admirer of Marenzio, brought out his First Book of Songs, printed in a format which allows the songs to be performed as lute songs or madrigals, as the performers prefer.

== See also ==
Musica Transalpina is also the title of a 2006 collection of poetry by Michelene Wandor.
