= Henry Ferrabosco =

Henry Ferrabosco (died 1658?) was a court musician before and during the First English Civil War and died a captain in the parliamentary army in Jamaica during the Caribbean expedition.

== Biography ==
Ferrabosco, was the youngest son of Alfonso Ferrabosco II and his wife Ellen (d. 1638) (daughter of Nicholas Lanier (c.1523–1612) and his second wife Lucretia).

On 24 October 1625 Henry and his maternal uncle Andrea Lanier were jointly appointed as musicians to the court and played wind instruments. On his father's death in 1628 his father's court four positions were shared by Henry and his brother Alfonso Ferrabosco III, although one position was as "composer", there are no known compositions by Henry, however he did continue to play wind instruments at court.

During the First English Civil War he may have played for Charles I at his court in Oxford. Not much is known of his movements after Oxford, he was in London in 1651 and was probably killed in 1658, while serving as a captain in the Parliamentary army engaged in the Caribbean expedition during the Anglo-Spanish War (1654–1660).
