= Giovanni Bassano =

Italian composer

Giovanni Bassano (c. 1561 – 3 September 1617) was an Italian composer associated with the Venetian School of composers and a cornettist of the late Renaissance and early Baroque eras. He was a key figure in the development of the instrumental ensemble at the basilica of San Marco di Venezia (St. Mark). His detailed book on instrumental ornamentation has survived. It is a rich resource for research in contemporary performance practice. Bassano was most responsible for the performance of the music of Giovanni Gabrieli, who would emerge as one of the most renowned members of the Venetian School.

== Life ==
Giovanni was likely born in Venice, Republic of Venice, around 1560 or 1561 in the parish of San Maurizio. He was the son of Santo Griti da Sebenico (now Šibenik, Croatia) and Orsetta Bassano. Orsetta's father Jacomo Bassano was the only brother of the six sons of Jeronimo Bassano who did not move permanently to London from Venice around 1540 as part of a new recorder consort to King Henry VIII. Santo seems to have taken over his father-in-law's instrument-making business and adopted the surname of Bassano for himself. He was the probable inventor of bassanelli.

Giovanni Bassano arrived as a young instrumental player at St. Mark's probably in 1576 at the age of 18. He quickly acquired a reputation as one of the finest instrumentalists in Venice. By 1585 he had published his first book, Ricercate, passagi et cadentie, which details how best to ornament passages when transcribing vocal music for instruments. In that same year he became a music teacher at the seminary associated with St. Mark's. In 1601, he took over the job from Girolamo Dalla Casa as head of the instrumental ensemble. He served in this post until his death in August 1617.

In addition to directing the music at St. Mark's, Bassano directed several groups of piffari, bands of wind players including bagpipes, recorders, shawms, flageolets, bassoons, and conceivably other instruments, which were used in other churches (such as San Rocco) or street festivals.

Bassano was also a composer, though his music has been overshadowed by his renown as a performer and his associated performance treatise. He wrote motets and concerti ecclesiastici (sacred concertos) in the Venetian polychoral style; and he also wrote madrigals, canzonettas and some purely instrumental music. His canzonettas achieved some fame outside Italy: Thomas Morley knew them, printing them in London in 1597 in English translation.

Some of Bassano's instrumental music is ingeniously contrapuntal, as though he were indulging a side of his personality that he was unable to display in his more ceremonial, homophonic compositions. His fantasias and ricercars are densely imitative and contain retrograde and retrograde inversions of motivic ideas, a rarity in counterpoint before the 20th century.

The similarity of Bassano's motets to the early work of Heinrich Schütz, who studied in Venice with Gabrieli, suggests that the two may have known each other. Likely Schütz knew Bassano's music and was influenced by it.

== Media ==
Dic Nobis Maria – mottetto a sei voci
Live performance – Dodecantus Vocal Ensemble – 2008

== Published works ==
- Fantasie a tre voci, per cantar et sonar con ogni sorte d'istromenti Venezia: Giacomo Vincenti & Riccardo Amadino, 1585. According to RISM, basso part only survives.
- Ricercate, passaggi et cadentie Venezia: Giacomo Vincenti & Riccardo Amadino, 1585; reprinted 1598. Modern edition: Richard Erig, Zürich, Musikverlag zum Pelikan, 1976; facsimile: Mieroprint.
- Canzonette a quatro voci Venezia: Giacomo Vincenti, 1587
- Il fiore dei capricci musicali a quattro voci, per sonar con ogni sorte di stromenti Venezia: Giacomo Vincenti, 1588. Tenor part only survives.
- Motetti, madrigali et canzone francese di diversi eccellenti autori Venice, 1591. Lost, survives only in the manuscript transcription of Friedrich Chrysander, Hamburger Staatsbibliothek MB/2488.
- Motetti per concerti ecclesiastici a 5, 6, 7, 8, & 12 voci Venezia: Giacomo Vincenti, 1598 (basso per l'organo part: 1599). Modern edition: Richard Charteris (1999) GIOVANNI BASSANO (c. 1558 – 1617), Opera omnia American Institute of Musicology CMM 101–1
- Concerti ecclesiastici a cinque, sei, sette, otto & dodeci voci ... libro secondo Venezia: Giacomo Vincenti, 1599. Modern edition: Richard Charteris (2003) GIOVANNI BASSANO (c. 1558 – 1617), Opera omnia American Institute of Musicology CMM 101–2
- Madrigali et canzonette concertate per potersi cantare con il basso, & soprano nel liuto, & istrumento da pena, con passaggi a ciascuna parte … libro primo Venezia: Giacomo Vincenti, 1602
