= Krzysztof Klabon =

Krzysztof Klabon (c. 1550 – c. 1616) was a Polish Renaissance composer, lutenist, and singer. He was one of the most renowned instrumentalists of his time in Poland. His extant works are: a cycle of lute songs (to texts by Grochowski) entitled Pieśni Kalliopy Slowienskiey. Ná teráznieysze, pod Byczyną, zwyćięstwo (Songs of the Slavonic Calliope: on the recent victory at Byczyna), one sacred piece, the five-part Kyrie paschalis and the soprano part of one other, Officium Sancta Maria.
