= Simone Verovio =

Dutch calligrapher, engraver, printer and editor

Simone Verovio (fl. 1575 – 17 December 1607) was a Netherlandish calligrapher, engraver, printer, and editor. He was born (perhaps with the name Simon Werrewick) in 's-Hertogenbosch and moved to Rome no later than 1575. By 1586 he began printing music books, using engraved plates. These were some of the first music books published in this manner. Some of the books he printed seem to have been engraved by Martin van Buyten, however through various editions the attribution changes. He printed Luzzasco Luzzaschi's Madrigali (1601) and Claudio Merulo's Toccate d'intavolatura (1598, 1604).
