= John Ferrabosco =

English musician

John Ferrabosco (baptised 1626 – 1682) was organist of Ely Cathedral from 1662 until his death in 1682.

He was the youngest son of Alfonso Ferrabosco II and his wife Ellen (d. 1638) (daughter of Nicholas Lanier (c.1523–1612) and his second wife Lucretia). John Ferrabosco took the degree of Bachelor of Music (Mus B) at Cambridge, per literas regias. It has been suggested that he may have introduced into the cathedral the Chanting Service as it is called, in which the verses are set alternately in a florid motet style and in a simple chant form. This is said to have been a usual practice in certain Italian churches, and it is supposed that he may have adopted the plan from the land of his family's origin.

The manuscript collection at Ely contains eleven anthems by John Ferrabosco, as well as many services, one of which, in B flat, is given by Tudway, who wrongly ascribes it to Alfonso Ferrabosco the younger. At the end of the 19th century it was also contained in other manuscript collections, as at Peterborough, and in F. A. Gore Ouseley's collection.
