= Alfonso Ferrabosco III =

English composer and court musician (died 1652)

Alfonso Ferrabosco
- Died: 1652

Alfonso Ferrabosco (junior) (died 1652) was an English composer and court musician.

== Biography ==
Alfonso was the son of Alfonso Ferrabosco the younger (d. 1628), who was probably the 'Master Alphonso Ferrabosco’ who sang in ‘a Hymenœi’ on Twelfth Night 1606, on the occasion of the marriage of Robert Devereux, 3rd Earl of Essex, with Lady Frances, daughter of the Earl of Suffolk. He succeeded his father as one of the 'viols' in the king's band in March 1627–1628, and, together with his brother Henry, was appointed to the place of musician in ordinary. The two brothers probably held jointly the post of composer in ordinary (see below).

Alfonso died in 1652 and was buried at St Margaret's Church, Westminster, on 14 July 1652. His brother Henry Ferrabosco died around 1658, and their shared post as musician, was filled by Thomas Bates, who seems to have gained by the division of labour practised by his predecessors, as he is given £50 and £40 yearly. The brothers were succeeded in the post of composer in ordinary by Dr. William Child, who was appointed on 4 July 1661 "in the roome of Alfonso Ferrabosco and Henry Ferrabosco, deceased"; he, however, only received a grant of £40 a year.

== Works ==
Four pieces for viols by him, some of which are called In nomine, are preserved in British Library Addit. manuscript 29427, where he is distinguished from his father by the addition of junior. Among the manuscripts in Ely Cathedral is an anthem, Let God arise, the full part of which is attributed to an Alfonso Ferrabosco, and the verse portions to William Lawes. The third Ferrabosco is the one who stands nearest in point of time to Lawes, and we may therefore conclude that in this anthem we have a work by him. No other composition of his is known.
