= Nicholas Yonge =

English music publisher (c. 1560–1619)

- Born: 1560; Lewes, Sussex
- Origin: England
- Died: 23 October 1619 (aged 58–59)
- Occupations: Singer and publisher

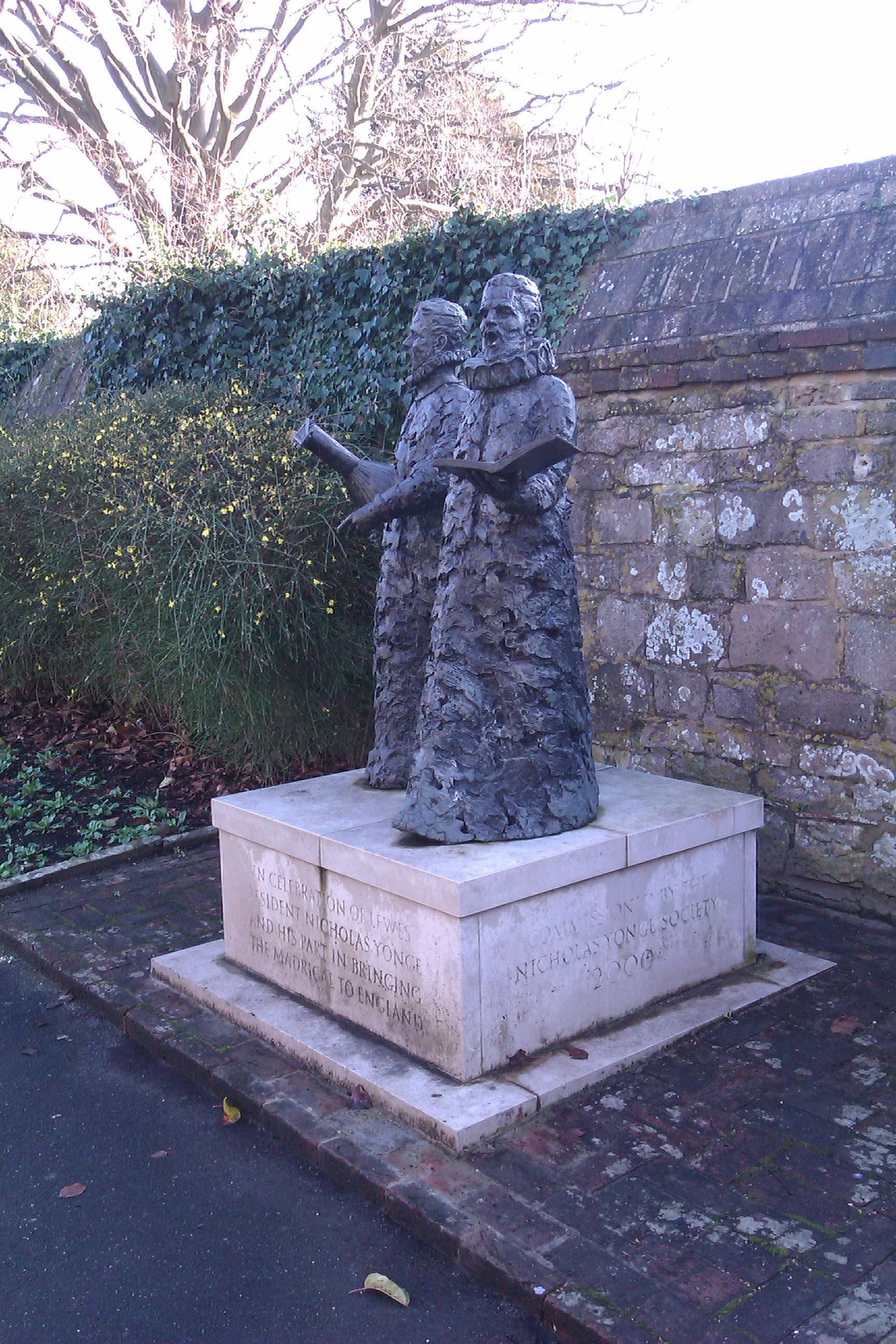
A statue in Lewes commemorating Yonge

Nicholas Yonge (also spelled Young, Younge; c. 1560 in Lewes, Sussex – buried 23 October 1619 in St Michael, Cornhill, London) was an English singer and publisher. He is most famous for publishing the Musica transalpina (1588), the earliest collection of Italian madrigals with their words translated into English. The first of the Elizabethan madrigal anthologies, it was enormously popular, and began a vogue for the composition and performance of madrigals in England which lasted into the first two decades of the 17th century. William Heather, founder of the music chair at Oxford University, included the book in his portrait, painted c. 1627, confirming the longevity of Musica transalpina's influence and popularity.

The collection contains 57 separate pieces by 18 composers, with Alfonso Ferrabosco the elder having the most, and Luca Marenzio second most. Ferrabosco was living in England until 1578, which could explain the large number of his compositions in the book; he was relatively unknown in Italy.

In 1597, Yonge published a second book (Musica transalpina: the Second Booke of Madrigalles, ... translated out of Sundrie Italian Authors). Composers such as John Wilbye and Thomas Weelkes used the pieces in both collections as models for their work.

At the close of 1588, William Byrd contributed two madrigals to the inaugural volume of Nicholas Yonge’s Musica Transalpina.
