= Cipriano de Rore =

Italian composer

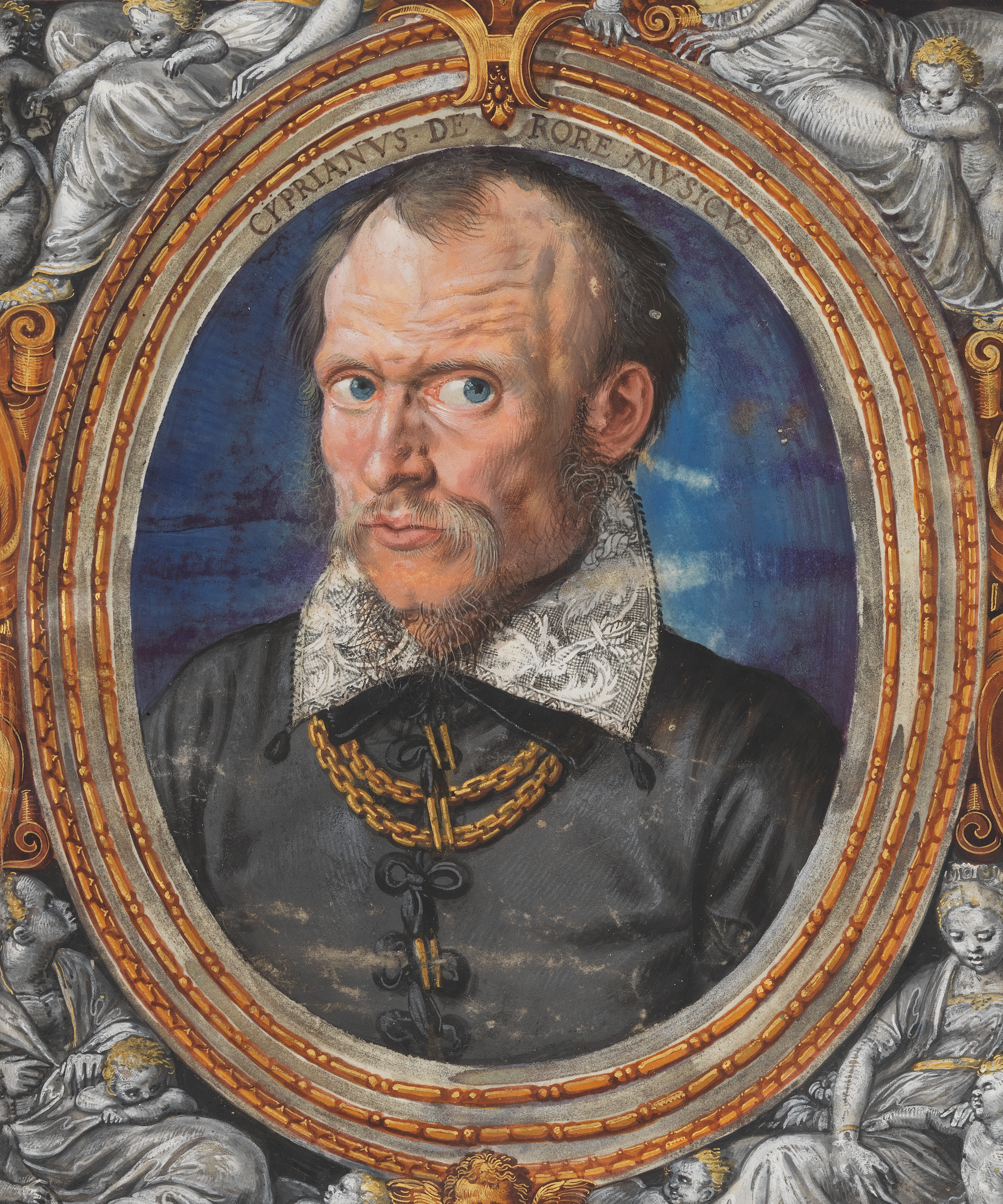
Detail of a miniature of Cipriano de Rore by Hans Müelich, probably 1558 or 1559

Cipriano de Rore (occasionally Cypriano) (1515 or 1516 – between 11 and 20 September 1565) was a Franco-Flemish composer of the Renaissance, active in Italy. Not only a central representative of the generation of Franco-Flemish composers after Josquin des Prez who went to live and work in Italy, Rore was one of the most prominent composers of madrigals in the middle of the 16th century. His experimental, chromatic, and highly expressive style had a decisive influence on the subsequent development of that secular music form.

== Life ==
=== Early years ===
Little is known of Rore's early life. His probable birth years (1515/1516) are known from his age at death (49, recorded on his tombstone in the cathedral in Parma), and his probable birthplace was a small town in Flanders, Ronse (Renaix), on the boundary between the French- and Dutch-speaking areas. Research has established that his parents were Celestinus Rore (died before 1564) and Barbara Van Coppenolle, and he had at least two siblings, Franciscus and Celestinus. The family was active in Ronse at least since 1400, and its coat of arms appeared both on his personal seal and his tombstone in Parma Cathedral.

Where Rore got his musical training is unknown. Based on a suggestive phrase in a 1559 madrigal dedicated to Margaret of Parma, the illegitimate daughter of Holy Roman Emperor Charles V, which implied a long association with her, he may have accompanied her when she went to Naples in 1533 before marrying into the Medici family. Margaret was born in a town within walking distance of Rore's birthplace. Before that speculative trip Rore may have had some early music instruction in Antwerp. Many gifted singers from the Netherlands went to Italy as children or adolescents, often when discovered by visiting nobility; both Orlande de Lassus and Giaches de Wert traveled to southern Italy in similar circumstances. When Margaret married Alessandro de' Medici in 1536, Rore may have gone his own way, but he is believed to have received some of his music education in Italy during his period of service with Margaret.

=== Venice and Ferrara ===
While it has long been claimed that Rore studied in Venice with Adrian Willaert and that he was a singer at San Marco, no specific documentation of either of these events has been found; some dedicatory material in his Venetian publications mentions him as a "disciple" or "follower", but not specifically as a student. Yet he was closely connected with Willaert and his associates for much of his career, and visited Venice at least once before 1542. Beginning in this year, documentation of Rore's whereabouts becomes clearer. A letter written on 3 November 1542 indicates he was at Brescia, where he was known to have remained until 16 April 1545. During this period he began to acquire fame as a composer, publishing, with the Venetian printer Scotto's assistance, his first book of madrigals in 1542, as well as two books of motets in 1544 and 1545. The reprints of these works two years later by both Scotto and Gardane indicated their high regard. Their technical mastery and stylistic indebtedness to Willaert and his circle make an early connection with Venice a reasonable supposition.

Rore then went to Ferrara, where payment records show he was maestro di cappella (choirmaster) beginning on 6 May 1546. This was the beginning of an extraordinarily productive portion of his life; while in the service of Duke Ercole II d'Este he wrote masses, motets, chansons, and of course madrigals, many of which were topical, some involving matters of the court itself. In 1556 Duke Ercole awarded Rore a benefice for his exceptional service. Also during the Ferrara years, Rore began cultivating his relations with the court of Albrecht V of Bavaria in Munich, sending them music, and having 26 motets produced in an elaborately illustrated manuscript with miniatures by Hans Muelich. In 1558 he requested a leave of absence from his employer in Ferrara to return to his homeland to care for his ailing parents. He stopped in Munich on the way, reaching the city on 1 May, where he assisted in preparation of the motet manuscript, and posed for the Muelich portrait. A document of September 1558 places him in Flanders, where he was helping his sister-in-law with estate matters on the death of Celistinus, his brother. By December he had returned to Ferrara.

=== Departure from Ferrara; last years ===
In July 1559 Rore left his post in Ferrara again, possibly because the new Duke Alfonso II d'Este preferred Francesco dalla Viola, a member of an old Ferrara family, to the foreigner. Once again he went north to his homeland; this time he did not return to Este service.

The situation in his homeland had deteriorated due to the ravages of the Wars of Independence, and when Rore reached it in autumn 1559, he found that his home town, Ronse, had been destroyed. Unable to regain his employment in Ferrara, he reentered the service of the House of Farnese, and after a stay in Antwerp, returned to Italy again, this time to Parma, in 1560. Unhappy there—Parma was not an intellectual and cultural center on the level of Ferrara or Venice—he left in 1563, briefly taking the prestigious position of maestro di cappella at St. Mark's upon Willaert's death. But he kept this post only into 1564, when he returned to Parma; he gave as his reason for departing Venice the disorder in the chapel and an insufficient salary.

He died at Parma the next year of unknown causes at age 49 and was buried in the cathedral in that city. Lodovico Rore, his nephew, erected his tombstone, indicating in the epitaph that his name would not be forgotten, even in the distant future.

== Music and influence ==
Rore was one of the most influential composers of the mid-16th century, mainly through the dissemination of his madrigals. His 1542 book was an extraordinary event, and recognized as such at the time: it established five voices as the norm, rather than four, and married the polyphonic texture of the Netherlandish motet with the Italian secular form, bringing a seriousness of tone that became one of the predominant trends in madrigal composition all the way into the 17th century. All the lines of development in the madrigal in the late century can be traced to ideas first seen in Rore; according to Alfred Einstein, his only true spiritual successor was Claudio Monteverdi, another revolutionary. But in his sacred music, Rore was more backward-looking, showing his connection to his Netherlandish roots: his masses, for example, are reminiscent of the work of Josquin des Prez.

Rore wrote 107 madrigals that are securely attributed to him; 16 secular Latin compositions, similar in form to madrigals; at least seven chansons; 53 motets, of which 51 survive; a Passion according to Saint John; five settings of the mass; some Magnificats; and a handful of other works.

=== Sacred music ===
While best known for his Italian madrigals, Rore was also a prolific composer of sacred music, both masses and motets. Josquin was his point of departure, and he developed many of his techniques from the older composer's style. Rore's first three masses are a response to the challenge of his heritage and to the music of Josquin. In addition to five masses, he wrote about 80 motets, many psalms, secular motets, and a setting of the St. John Passion.

=== Secular music ===
It was as a composer of madrigals, such as the popular "Ancor che col partire", that Rore achieved enduring fame. He was one of the most influential madrigalists at mid-century, publishing his madrigals primarily between 1542 and 1565. His early madrigals reflect Willaert with the use of clear diction, thick and continuous counterpoint, and pervasive imitation. These works are mostly for four or five voices, with one for six and another for eight. Their tone tends toward the serious, especially as contrasted with the light character of the work of his predecessors Arcadelt and Verdelot. Rore preferred serious subject matter, including the works of Petrarch and tragedies presented at Ferrara. He brought out the varying moods of the texts he set, developing musical devices for this purpose, and often ignored the structure of the line, line division, and rhyme, deeming it unnecessary that the musical and poetic lines correspond.

Rore experimented with chromaticism, following some of the ideas of his contemporary Nicola Vicentino. He used all the resources of polyphony as they had developed by the mid-16th century, including imitation and canonic techniques, in the service of text setting.

Rore was the model for many of the great madrigalists of the late 16th century, including Monteverdi. According to Alfred Einstein's The Italian Madrigal (1949), Monteverdi was Rore's true spiritual successor. Einstein also wrote, "Rore holds the key to the whole development of the Italian madrigal after 1550."

Rore also composed secular Latin motets, a relatively unusual "crossover" form in the mid-16th century. These motets, a secular variation of a normally sacred form, paralleled the sacred madrigal, the madrigale spirituale, a sacred variation on a popular secular form. Stylistically they are similar to his madrigals, and he published them throughout his career; occasionally they appeared in collections of madrigals, such as in his posthumous Fifth Book for five voices (1566), and he also included some in a collection of motets for five voices published in 1545.

== Works ==
=== Secular ===
- I madrigali (Venice, 1542, five voices)
- Il primo libro de madregali cromatici (Venice, 1544, five voices; enlargement of 1542 publication)
- Il secondo libro de madregali (Venice, 1544, five voices)
- Il terzo libro di madrigali, (Venice, 1548, five voices)
- Musica ... sopra le stanze del Petrarcha ... libro terzo (Venice, 1548, five voices)
- Il primo libro de madrigali (Ferrara, 1550, five voices) (also contains chansons in French)
- Il quarto libro d'imadregali (Venice, five voices)
- Il secondo libro de madregali, (Venice, 1557, four voices)
- Li madrigali libro quarto, (Venice, 1562, five voices)
- Le vive fiamme de' vaghi e dilettevoli madrigali, (Venice, 1565, four and five voices) (also contains secular Latin pieces)
- Il quinto libro de madrigali (1566, five voices) (also contains secular Latin pieces)
- Numerous additional works in anthologies, between 1547 and 1570

=== Sacred ===
- Motectorum liber primus (Venice, 1544, five voices)
- Motetta (Venice, 1545, five voices)
- Il terzo libro di motetti (Venice, 1549, five voices)
- Passio Domini Nostri Jesu Christi secundum Joannem (Paris, 1557; two to six voices)
- Motetta (Venice, 1563, four voices)
- Sacrae cantiones (Venice, 1595; five to seven voices)

== References and further reading ==
- Atlas, Allan W. Renaissance Music. New York, Norton, 1998. ISBN 0-393-97169-4
- Brown, Howard M. and Louise K. Stein. Music in the Renaissance, Second Ed. New Jersey: Prentice Hall, 1999.
- Einstein, Alfred. The Italian Madrigal. Three volumes. Princeton, New Jersey, Princeton University Press, 1949. ISBN 0-691-09112-9
- Johnson, Alvin H. "Cipriano de Rore," in The New Grove Dictionary of Music and Musicians, ed. Stanley Sadie. 20 vol. London, Macmillan Publishers Ltd., 1980. ISBN 1-56159-174-2
- Owens, Jessie Ann: "Rore, Cipriano de", Grove Music Online, ed. L. Macy (Accessed November 18, 2007), (subscription access)
- Reese, Gustave. Music in the Renaissance. New York, W.W. Norton & Co., 1954. ISBN 0-393-09530-4
