= Domenico Ferrabosco =

Italian composer (1513–1574)

Domenico Maria Ferrabosco (14 February 1513 – February 1574) was an Italian composer and singer of the Renaissance, and the eldest musician in a large prominent family from Bologna. He spent his career both in Bologna and Rome. His surviving music is all vocal, consisting of madrigals and motets, although he is principally known for his madrigals, which musicologist Alfred Einstein compared favorably to those of his renowned contemporary Cipriano de Rore.

== Life ==
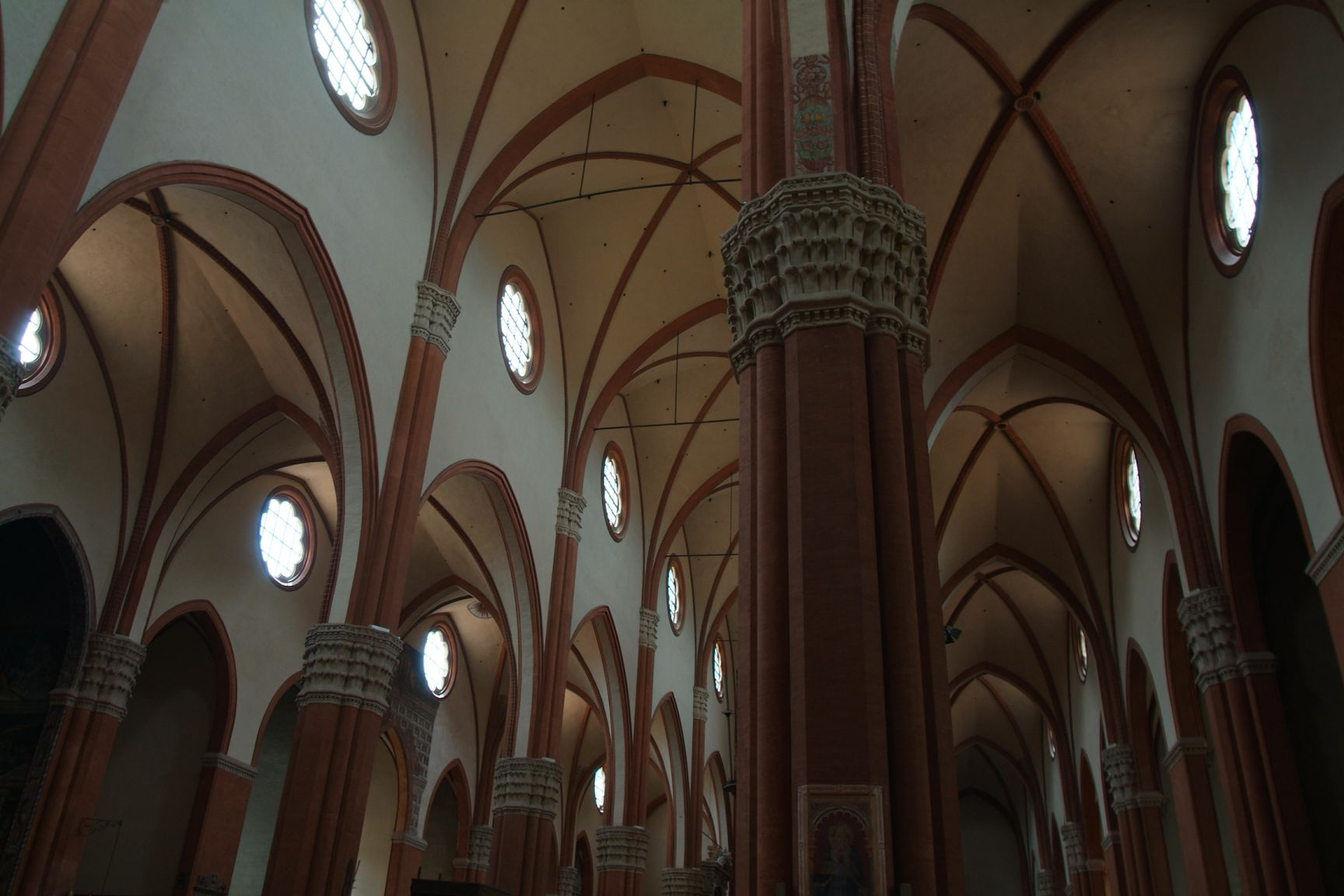
Interior of San Petronio Basilica in Bologna, where Ferrabosco was a singer, and later choir director.

Born in Bologna, Domenico was one of four sons of Annibale Ferrabosco, members of a distinguished Bolognese family whose genealogical records date back to the middle of the 15th century. Domenico is the first of the family known to be a musician. Little is known about his early life. He was a singer at the cathedral of San Petronio, and by 1540 had established a high enough reputation for his various musical activities that the city officials gave him a lifetime stipend to oversee the palace musicians.

Sometime in the 1540s he went to Rome, and he became magister puerorum (director of the boy's choir) for the Julian Chapel in 1546. However, due to family obligations he returned to Bologna in 1547, and became maestro di cappella (choir director) at San Petronio, the church where he had previously been a singer, in 1548. The Bolognese Senate also granted him a non-musical position, Regulator et scriba campionis creditorum Montis portarum. He moved back to Rome in 1550, where he was appointed to be cantore pontificio (singer in the papal chapel) on 27 November, although he did not begin performing the duties of this position until April 1551. Palestrina was one of the other composers and singers working in the principal Roman chapels at that time, and the two of them, along with all the other married singers, were removed from their posts, on pension, in September 1555 under an edict by the new Pope Paul IV, who decided to more rigidly enforce the rule on celibacy for his musicians than had his predecessors. Ferrabosco probably did not go back to Bologna after this, but instead went to Paris with his family, where three of his sons – including Alfonso, who was to become a renowned musician in England much later – enjoyed the patronage of the influential Cardinal of Lorraine, Charles de Guise.

By 1570 Ferrabosco was back in Bologna taking care of his estate, arranging for succession of his Senate-granted scribal position to his eldest son, and making out his will, which was dated 1573. He died in February 1574 in Bologna; by this time his most famous son, Alfonso, was making a name for himself in England.

== Music ==
Ferrabosco published only one book of his works, a large collection of 45 madrigals for four voices in 1542 (by Antonio Gardano in Venice). They were similar in style to the early madrigals by Jacques Arcadelt, Philippe Verdelot, and Costanzo Festa. Alfred Einstein praised the book, saying of Ferrabosco's art: "His work lasts, because he has access to a form of expression which was completely closed to Cipriano de Rore, namely the expression of the graceful and the attractive." Regarding the music itself he adds: "...homophony is enlivened by light polyphony and reflects a noble sentimentality which is not easily disturbed in its spiritual equilibrium." Unlike Rore, who was the most innovative madrigalist of mid-century, as well as one of the most famous, Ferrabosco was content to write in the style of the pioneers of the 1530s, such as Verdelot, in a light and graceful manner, avoiding the chromaticism and expressive intensity that defined the mid-century madrigal. Yet his music appears alongside Rore's, for example in that composer's second madrigal book for five voices (1544) which includes Ferrabosco's setting of the sonnet Più d'alto Pin ch'in mezz'un'orto sia.

Some of his music shows the influence of the contemporary French chanson, for example a strambotto he set prior to 1554, in the collection De diversi autori il quarto libro de Madrigali a quattro voci a note bianche indicates a possible connection with a set of chansons published in 1548 in Lyon by Dominique Phinot, both in its subject matter, rhythm, and sonority.

As texts for his madrigals, Ferrabosco preferred love lyrics, including works by Petrarch, Pietro Bembo, Ludovico Ariosto, and others; many of the poets remain anonymous.

By far Ferrabosco's most famous composition was the madrigal Io mi son giovinetta, a ballata from Boccaccio's Decameron (Neifile's song from the end of the ninth day), a madrigal which became so extraordinarily popular that it appeared in dozens of madrigal prints for the next hundred years, matching the popularity of Jacques Arcadelt's Il bianco e dolce cigno. It appeared in the 1542 anthology Primo libro d'i Madrigali de diversi eccellentissimi autori a misura di breve, along with the works of many other composers; Palestrina used it as the basis for a mass for four voices, presumably after making Ferrabosco's acquaintance in Rome; he published the mass in 1570. Vincenzo Galilei, father of the astronomer, arranged it for lute, and its last known reprint dates from 1654.

In addition to his madrigals, Ferrabosco wrote motets, some of which appear in anthologies. He wrote a five-voice setting of Ascendens Christus as well as a five-voice setting of Usquequo, Domine. Ferrabosco's complete works are available in an edition by R. Charteris in Corpus mensurabilis musicae, vol. 102 (1992).
