= Alfonso Ferrabosco the elder =

Italian composer (1543–1588)

Alfonso Ferrabosco (baptized 18 January 1543 – 12 August 1588) was an Italian composer. While mostly famous as the solitary Italian madrigalist working in England, and the one mainly responsible for the growth of the madrigal there, he also composed much sacred music. He also may have been a spy for Elizabeth I while he was in Italy.

His father, Domenico Ferrabosco, and son, Alfonso Ferrabosco the younger were also composers.

== Life and career ==
He was the eldest son of Domenico Ferrabosco, and a member of an aristocratic Bolognese family which had many musicians among its members. Alfonso was born in Bologna. Little is known about his early life, but he is known to have spent part of it in Rome and part in Lorraine in the service of Charles of Guise. In 1562, probably with his uncle, he came to England for the first time, where he found employment with Elizabeth I. Throughout his life he made periodic trips to Italy, not without controversy, for evidently neither the Pope nor the Inquisition fully approved of his spending time in England, which was in the late 16th century actively at war with Roman Catholic countries. While in England, he lost his Italian inheritance, and while away in Italy he was charged with certain crimes in England (including robbing and killing another foreigner). While he was successful in clearing his name, he left England in 1578 and never returned; he died in Bologna.

Many have said that he was a secret service agent for Elizabeth, working during a time when such intelligence was desperately needed; however, little more than circumstantial evidence has ever been produced on this allegation. He was certainly unusually well-paid for a musician at the court of Elizabeth. Attempts by Elizabeth to get him to return to England after 1580 were fruitless.

== Music ==
Fantasia 'Di Sei Bassi’ from the Sambrook Manuscript, New York. NYp, Drexel 4302, p.255, no.45 (ca.1613-19)

Ut re mi fa sol la à3 from John Baldwyne’s Commonplace Book, London. GB-Lbl, R.M.24.d.2 (ca.1590-1606)
Performed by Phillip W. Serna, Treble, Tenor & Bass Viols & Violones

Ferrabosco brought the madrigal to England. While he did not start the madrigal craze there—that really began in 1588 with the publication of Nicholas Yonge's Musica Transalpina, the popularity of which was such that the madrigal instantly became the most prevalent type of composition in England—he did plant the seeds for this development. Ferrabosco's style may have been tame and conservative by the standards of a Marenzio or a Luzzaschi, but it was harmonious with English taste. Most of his madrigals were for five or six voices, were light in style, and largely ignored the progressive developments in Italy such as expressive chromaticism and word-painting. Technically they were skillful, and this is the quality that impressed the English commentators the most: "deep skill" was the phrase Thomas Morley used to describe his work when he published several of his compositions in a collection of 1598, ten years after his death. Robert Dow also included two of his works in his manuscript, now known as the Dow Partbooks.

In addition to the madrigals, Ferrabosco wrote sacred music, including motets, lamentations, and several anthems, all in a cappella vocal style. He also wrote instrumental music: fantasias, pavans, galliards, In Nomines, and passamezzos, for a variety of instrumental combinations including lute and viols.
