= Jeronimo Bassano =

Italian musician and patriarch of Bassano family

Jeronimo Bassano was an Italian musician in the Republic of Venice who is notable as the patriarch of a family of musicians: five of his sons, Anthony, Alvise, Jasper, John (Giovanni), and Baptista Bassano, moved from Venice to England to serve in the court of King Henry VIII. They performed as a recorder consort. Jacomo Bassano was his only son to keep his primary residence in Venice. Jeronimo Bassano never moved, and he was listed in Venice as a "Maestro of the trumpets and shawms." He is believed to be the maternal grandfather of composer Giovanni Bassano.

== Life ==
Jeronimo was the son of Baptista "Piva" of Bassano del Grappa, a town 35 miles from Venice. Baptista was a musician who played the piva, a small bagpipe. He was the son of Andrea de Crespano, who was from the village of Crespano, about nine miles east of Bassano. Andrea, Baptista, and Jeronimo were all described as musicians and musical instrument makers.

At the beginning of the 16th century, Jeronimo moved from Bassano to Venice, where he was described as "Maestro Hieronimo", a piffero player to the Doge of Venice between 1506 and 1512. The historian A.L. Rowse, in correspondence to The Times in 1973, claimed that the Bassanos were Jewish. Roger Prior claimed in a 1995 book co-authored with Dr. David Lasocki that the family were converted Jews.

But, Giulio M. Ongaro in his "New Documents on the Bassano Family" (1992) in Early Music and Alessio Ruffatti argue that the Bassanos who moved to England might not have been Jewish.

== Family tree ==
- Jeronimo Bassano, piffero player to the Doge of Venice between 1506 and 1512
  - Alvise (died London, 15–31 Aug 1554), worked for the Scuola di San Marco, Venice in 1515, and the Concerto Palatino in Bologna between 1519 and 1521
    - Augustine (bur. London, Oct 24, 1604)
    - Lodovico (bur. London, July 18, 1593)
  - Jasper [Gasparo] (bur. London, 8 May 1577)
  - John [Zuane] (died Venice, Sept–Dec 1570)
  - Anthony [Antonio] (i) (bur. London, 19 Oct 1574)
    - Mark Anthony (born London, 10 Jan 1546; died London, 11 Sep 1599)
    - Arthur (born London, 31 Oct 1547; bur. London, 10 Sept 1624)
      - Anthony (ii) (born London, 15 Oct 1579; bur. London, 22 Apr 1658)
    - Andrea (born London, 12 Aug 1554; bur. Horne, Surrey, 3 Aug 1626)
      - Thomas (?bap. London, 27 Feb 1589; bur. London, 29 Sept 1617)
    - Edward (i) (born London, 19 Oct 1551; bur. London, 25 May 1615)
    - Jeronimo (ii) (born London, March 11, 1559; bur. Waltham Abbey, Essex, Aug 22, 1635)
      - Scipio (bap. London, 11 Dec 1586; died London, 26 Nov 1613)
      - Edward (ii) (bap. London, 28 Dec 1588; died London, 22 Oct 1638)
      - Henry (bap. London, 8 April 1597; bur. London, 29 Aug 1665)
  - Jacomo (in Venice between 1542 and 1545)
      - Giovanni Bassano (grandson of Jacomo, born ?Venice, 1560/61; died Venice, Aug 16, 1617)
  - Baptista (bur. London, 11 April 1576)

== See also ==
- Lupo family
- List of musical families (classical music)
