= Alfonso Ferrabosco the younger =

English composer and viol player (c1575-1628)

Fantasia 'On the Hexachord' à4, VdGS No.10 - The Hexachord Ascending, Oxford. Christ College, Mus.Ms.436 (ca.1630)

Alfonso Ferrabosco the Elder (1543–1588) – Fantasia 'Di Sei Bassi’ from the Sambrook Manuscript, New York. NYp, Drexel 4302, p.255, no.45 (ca.1613–19)
Performed by Phillip W. Serna, Treble, Tenor & Bass Viols with Violone

Alfonso Ferrabosco the younger (c. 1575 – March 1628) was an English composer and viol player of Italian descent. He straddles the line between the Renaissance and Baroque eras.

== Biography ==
Ferrabosco was born at Greenwich, the illegitimate son of the Italian composer Alfonso Ferrabosco the elder. His mother might have been Susanna Symons, whom Alfonso the elder later married. Ferrabosco the younger was left under the guardianship of Gomer van Awsterwyke, a member of Queen Elizabeth I's court. Although Alfonso the elder asked for Alfonso the younger to be sent to him in Italy, where he had moved with his wife, the Queen insisted that he stay in England. Ferrabosco remained in Gomer van Awsterwyke's care until Awsterwyke's death in 1592. At this time he started a long career as a court musician.

After the Union of the Crowns he became the private music tutor of Prince Henry and a groom of privy chamber, with a salary of £50. Ferrabosco was paid for "making the songs" for Anne of Denmark's masque, The Vision of the Twelve Goddesses, performed in January 1604.

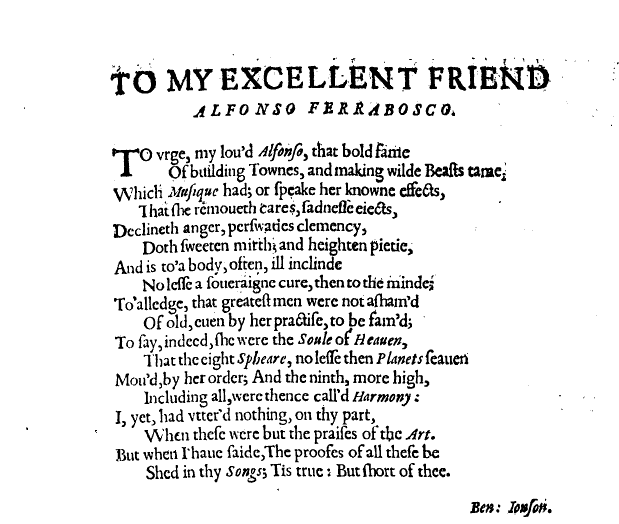
A poem addressed to Ferrabosco from Jonson in the former's Book of Ayres.

Ferrabosco collaborated with Ben Jonson on several projects, including The Masque of Blackness (1605), and wrote music for several other masques besides. His music was published by John Browne in 1609, including a number of settings of poems by John Donne and Thomas Campion, as well as lute and viol music. He frequently wrote in the new declamatory Baroque style, and although he never went to Italy, he was well aware of contemporary Italian music.

Ferrabosco the younger's reputation was built largely on his prowess as a viol player, and even more so his compositions for viol consort. These were highly idiomatic works, with many divisions, and virtuosic lines. He also wrote many In Nomines, which were great examples of that popular genre, without the pedantic bent many later In nomines possessed. Ferrabosco was also one of the first to write lyra viol music in tablature, along with Coprario, and wrote a book of Lessons for the lyra viol.

Ferrabosco continually had difficulty with debts, and was involved in an unsuccessful scheme involving various rights on the River Thames, including dredging it for gravel, and imposing fines on people who caused a nuisance on it. He died in March 1628 and was buried at St Alfege Church on the 11th of that month, in his home village of Greenwich.

== Family ==
In January 1612 Ferrabosco the younger married Ellen (died 1638) (daughter of Nicholas Lanier (c. 1523–1612) and his second wife Lucretia). they had three notable sons: Alfonso Ferrabosco (died 1652), Henry Ferrabosco (died c. 1658), and John Ferrabosco (baptised 1626, died 1682) all of whom were musicians. Two of his daughters are known to have married musicians: Elizabeth married George Bunckley, and Catherine married Edward Coleman. Coleman was a court musician after the Restoration. They were friends of Samuel Pepys and both of them are known to have sung in theatre productions.
