= Fedor Ozep =

Russian film director

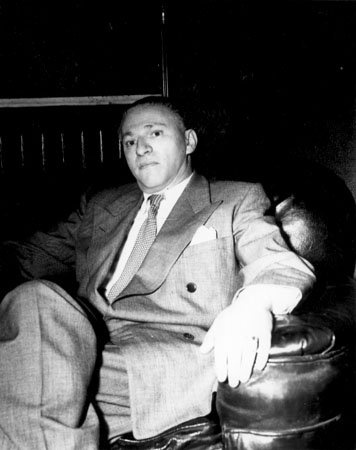
Fedor Ozep

Fedor Ozep or Fyodor Otsep (Russian: Фёдор Алекса́ндрович О́цеп, Fyodor Aleksandrovich Otsep; February 9, 1895 – June 20, 1949) was a Russian-American film director and screenwriter, born in Moscow. An important early writer on film and film theory, he served as dramaturge for the Mezhrabpomfilm-Rus company and wrote a number of films for directors such as V.I. Pudovkin and Yakov Protazanov before turning to directing in 1926.

Ozep was born into a Jewish merchant family in Moscow; his parents Khonon and Basya Otsep owned an umbrella factory. During the production of The Living Corpse in Germany, he decided to remain and worked throughout Europe during the 1930s, enjoying international acclaim for films including The Murderer Dimitri Karamazov and Amok. With the advent of World War II he moved to Hollywood but was unable to establish a career there, directing only one film. His last two films were made in Canada. He died of a heart attack in Los Angeles in 1949.

== Filmography ==
- The Queen of Spades (1916, dir. Yakov Protazanov), screenwriter
- Metel (1918, dir. Nikolai Malikoff), screenwriter
- Polikushka (1922, dir. Alexander Sanin), screenwriter
- The Cigarette Girl from Mosselprom (1924, dir. Yuri Zhelyabuzhsky), screenwriter
- The Stationmaster (1925, dir. Ivan Moskvin, Yuri Zhelyabuzhsky), screenwriter
- Aelita (1924, dir. Yakov Protazanov), screenwriter
- Miss Mend (1926, dir. Fedor Ozep, Boris Barnet), director and screenwriter
- The Yellow Ticket (1928), director and screenwriter
- The Doll With Millions (1928, dir. Sergei Komarov), screenwriter
- The Living Corpse (1929), director and screenwriter
- The Murderer Dimitri Karamazov (1931), director and screenwriter
  - There were two versions made at the same time, one in French and one in German, German language film co-director: Erich Engels
- Mirages de Paris (1933), director and screenwriter
- Großstadtnacht (1933), director and screenwriter
  - Großstadtnacht and Mirages de Paris were two versions of the same film, made at the same time, one in French and one in German
- Amok (1934), director
- A Woman Alone (1936, dir. Eugene Frenke), screenwriter
- The Queen of Spades (1937), director and screenwriter
- Gibraltar (1938), director
- Princess Tarakanova (1938), director and screenwriter
  - There were two versions made at the same time, one in French and one in Italian, Italian language film co-director: Mario Soldati
- Three Russian Girls (1943, dir. Fedor Ozep, Henry S. Kesler), director
- Cero en conducta (1945, dir. Fedor Ozep, José María Téllez), director
- The Music Master (Le Père Chopin) (1945), director
- Whispering City (1947), director
- La Forteresse (1947), director
  - Whispering City and La Forteresse were two versions of the same film, made at the same time, one in English and one in French
