= Eugène Goossens =

Eugène Goossens was the name of three notable musicians (from the same family). Listed chronologically:

- Eugène Goossens, père (1845–1906), conductor (opera)
- Eugène Goossens, fils (1867–1958), violinist and conductor
- Sir Eugene Goossens (composer) (1893–1962), composer and conductor (son and grandson)

See also

- Eugene Goossen (1920–1997), American art critic and historian
