= Polikushka =

Polikushka may refer to:

- Polikúshka (novella), an 1860 novella by Leo Tolstoy
- Polikushka (film), a 1922 Soviet drama film, based on the novella
