= Frederick Laurence =

British composer and orchestral manager, 1884-1942

Frederick Laurence (until 1919 Frederick Kessler, 25 May 1884 - 3 May 1942) was a British composer, early film music pioneer and latterly an orchestral manager and administrator. He changed his name mid-career by deed poll in 1919 to avoid the anti-German sentiment prevalent in Britain at the time.

== Early career ==
Born in Holloway, North London, his parents were of German heritage. His father, an amateur cellist and pianist, began his musical education, and from the age of 19 he took private lessons from Joseph Holbrooke (only five years his senior), also studying in Germany, France and Austria. Holbrooke first included Laurence's music into his Modern English Chamber Music concert series in 1905. Most of his early works composed using the name Kessler - including a Piano Trio and a String Quartet - remained in manuscript and have since been lost. Those that were published show his adoption of an adventurous harmonic language for their time.

== Librarian of the Proms ==
Unable to sustain himself financially as a composer, Laurence joined the music publishers Goodwin & Tabb, and through them became the librarian of the BBC Proms under Sir Henry Wood. Through this arrangement he secured performances of some of his own orchestral music at the Proms, including the world premieres of Legend (later re-titled A Spirit’s Wayfaring: Poem for Orchestra) in 1918 and The Dance of the Witch Girl in 1920, as well as five performances of the smaller scale Tristis between 1919 and 1923. Other orchestral works, including The Dream Harlequin, Milandor and A Miracle, were performed at Royal College of Music Patron's Fund rehearsals.

He married Mildrid Rebecca Hadfield, Holbrooke's sister-in-law, in 1909 and there were two children. After her death in 1921 he married the harpist Marie Goossens in 1926. Their address in the 1930s was Crewkerne, High Road, North Finchley.

== Film Music ==
In 1924 Laurence helped the conductor Eugene Goossens II compile and fit to the action orchestral music from various sources, to be performed live at London screenings of the film The Epic of Everest, something of a landmark in film music history. This led to Laurence being asked to compose an entirely original film score for the Russian fairy tale film Morozko – which according to Julie Brown is "the earliest important original score for a film screened in Britain". After this, however, Laurence returned to composing concert music, missing out on the lucrative opportunity that synchronised sound film opened up just three years later. The world premiere of the restored score for Morozko was presented at the 14th British Silent Film Festival (2011) at the Barbican in London.

== Later career and death ==
Laurence continued as a composer but there were few public performances of his music. Instead much of his time was taken up by orchestral management and music libraries, most notably from 1932 for Sir Thomas Beecham and the embryonic London Philharmonic Orchestra. Financial difficulties at this early stage and then the onset of war resulted in impoverishment for Laurence. After a period working as a paid air raid warden, he secured a contract to recruit and manage orchestral players for the Sidney Beer Orchestra (later the National Symphony Orchestra) in 1941, but died before being able to take up the appointment.

Some of his manuscripts are held at the British Library Music Collections. The first recordings of his music, including the newly published Violin Sonata, were issued in 2024 by Orchid Classics.

== Selected published works ==
- Interludes for Pianoforte, op.11 (1904, published Sidney Riorden, 1907)
- Phases, op.18 (Breitkopf and Härtel, 1907)
- Three Studies for Pianoforte, 0p.21 (1905, published Sidney Riorden, 1907)
- Three Fantasies for voice and piano (1906, published Sidney Riorden, 1907)
- Eucharistic Hymn (Opus Music, 1910).
- Tristis, arranged for string orchestra or organ (Goodwin & Tabb, 1919)
- Trio for Violin, Violoncello and Pianoforte (1912, published Curwen, 1925)
- Spring Nocturne for violin and piano (or harp) (Curwen, 1929)
- Violin Sonata (1920s, published by Chris Laurence, 2024)

Orchestral works listed by Nicolas Slonimsky include:

- The Spirit's Wayfaring (1918)
- The Dance of the Witch Girl (1920)
- The Dream of Harlequin
- Enchantment
- Fire Earth
- The Gate of Vision
- Milandor
- A Miracle
- Night
- The Passionate Quest
