= Morozko =

Morozko (Russian: Морозко) may refer to:

- Father Frost (fairy tale), a Russian folk fairy tale
- Morozko (1924 film), based on the fairy tale
- Jack Frost (1964 film), based on the fairy tale
- Luka Morozko, Russian Cossack, leader of the first exploration of Kamchatka Peninsula (1695-1696)
- Morozko, a Russian superhero from DC Comics
