= Oboe Concerto (Vaughan Williams) =

1944 oboe concerto by Vaughan Williams

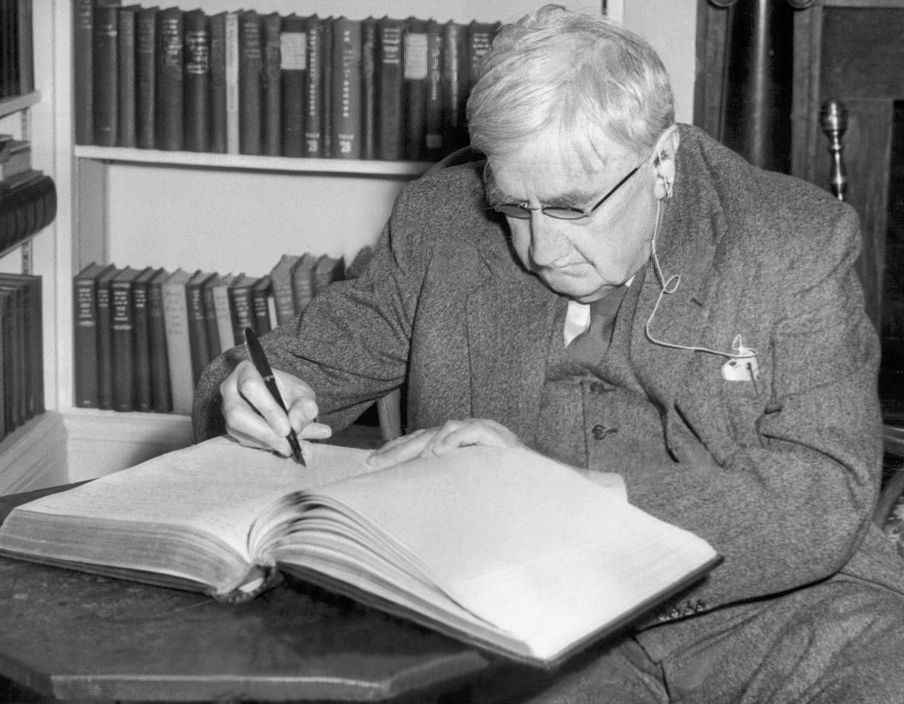
Ralph Vaughan Williams in 1954

The Concerto in A minor for Oboe and Strings was written by Ralph Vaughan Williams in 1943–44 for the oboist Léon Goossens, to whom the score is dedicated.

== History ==
Vaughan Williams began work on the Oboe Concerto in 1943, immediately after completing the Fifth Symphony, with which it shares a great deal. Amongst other things, the concerto began as a revision of a scherzo movement originally intended for the symphony. The concerto was first performed by Léon Goossens accompanied by the Oxford Symphony Orchestra conducted by Thomas Armstrong on 8th March 1944 in Oxford Town Hall. The concerto was to have been performed at a Proms concert on 5 July 1944, but due to the threat of V1 rocket raids on London the Proms season was curtailed. The piece was played in Liverpool instead, on 30 September 1944 in a concert by the Liverpool Philharmonic, conducted by Malcolm Sargent, that also included the Oboe Concerto by the soloist's brother, Eugène Goossens.

== Analysis ==
This pastoral piece is divided into three movements:

1. Rondo Pastorale (Allegro moderato)
2. Minuet and Musette (Allegro moderato)
3. Scherzo (Presto – Doppio più lento – Lento – Presto)

The concerto has an element of cyclic form. Each movement begins and ends with the same pentatonic theme, spanning an octave. It is scored for a solo oboe and strings.
