= The Stationmaster (1925 film) =

1925 film

- Directed by: Ivan Moskvin; Yuri Zhelyabuzhsky
- Written by: Alexander Pushkin (novella); Valentin Turkin; Fyodor Otsep
- Starring: Ivan Moskvin; Vera Malinovskaya; Boris Tamarin
- Cinematography: Yevgeni Alekseyev; Yuri Zhelyabuzhsky
- Production company: Films Radia
- Release date: 1925
- Running time: 77 minutes
- Country: Soviet Union
- Languages: Silent; Russian intertitles

The Stationmaster (Russian: Коллежский регистратор, romanized: Kollezhskiy registrator) is a 1925 Soviet drama film directed by Ivan Moskvin and Yuri Zhelyabuzhsky and starring Moskvin and Vera Malinovskaya. It is an adaptation of Alexander Pushkin's 1831 short story "The Stationmaster".

The film's sets were designed by the art director Ivan Stepanov.

== Cast ==
- Vera Malinovskaya as Dunja
- Ivan Moskvin as Postmaster
- Boris Tamarin
- Vsevolod Aksyonov
- Nikolai Aleksandrov
- Nikolai Kostromskoy
- Nikolai Ryzhov
- Vladimir Uralsky

== Bibliography ==
- Cowie, Peter. Before 1940: A Concise History of the Cinema. A. Zwemmer, 1971.
