= National Symphony Orchestra (UK) =

The National Symphony Orchestra was founded in 1941 by conductor Sidney Beer (1899–1971) as the Sidney Beer Orchestra. It flourished during World War II, disbanding in 1946.

== Sidney Beer Orchestra ==
Sidney Beer was widely regarded as a wealthy amateur. He spent most of his time and money on racehorses (winner, Nunthorpe Stakes, 1925) until signing up to study conducting with Malcolm Sargent at the Royal College of Music in 1931, by which time he was 32 years old. He made his professional conducting debut in 1932 with the Mozarteum Orchestra of Salzburg and later conducted the Vienna Philharmonic. Returning to London in 1940 he was appalled by the lack of orchestral music performances, and set about forming an orchestra that would have the best professional players and sufficient rehearsal time.

Frederick Laurence, the composer husband of Marie Goossens, was hired as the orchestral manager and recruiter, but died before taking up the position. Victor Olof subsequently took over as manager. The first concerts were held on Saturday afternoons during the first three months of 1941, starting at the Savoy Theatre and then moving to Queen's Hall - which was soon destroyed by an incendiary bomb on Saturday, 10 May.

== National Symphony Orchestra ==
In 1942 the orchestra was enlarged and renamed as the National Symphony Orchestra, with a series of Sunday concerts at the Phoenix Theatre. On 19 January 1943 the orchestra performed at the Royal Albert Hall with pianist Cyril Smith as the soloist.

The orchestra made several recordings for the Decca record label and was hired to play for film soundtracks, including The Rake's Progress (1945), Caesar and Cleopatra (1945) and The Magic Bow (1946). In 1946 it gave a further series of concerts at the Royal Albert Hall and toured Switzerland and France, performing Richard Strauss's Don Juan with the composer present in Lausanne.

Beer found the financial resources to engage top-class players, including Dennis Brain, Norman Del Mar, Léon Goossens and Reginald Kell. The wind section relied heavily on young players from the RAF Central Band, based in Uxbridge. When the orchestra was disbanded in 1946 many of the players went on to become key members of the Royal Philharmonic Orchestra: leaders David McCallum and Oscar Lampe – and the Philharmonia Orchestra: leader Leonard Hirsch, Leonard Rubens (viola), Douglas Cameron and Cedric Sharpe (cello), Alec Whittaker (oboe), Reginald Kell (clarinet), John Alexandra (bassoon), Dennis Brain (horn) and Harold Jackson (trumpet).

The success of the orchestra during difficult circumstances inspired the formation of other independent orchestras, most notably the New London Orchestra by Alec Sherman in 1941.
