= Sergei Golovin =

Russian actor

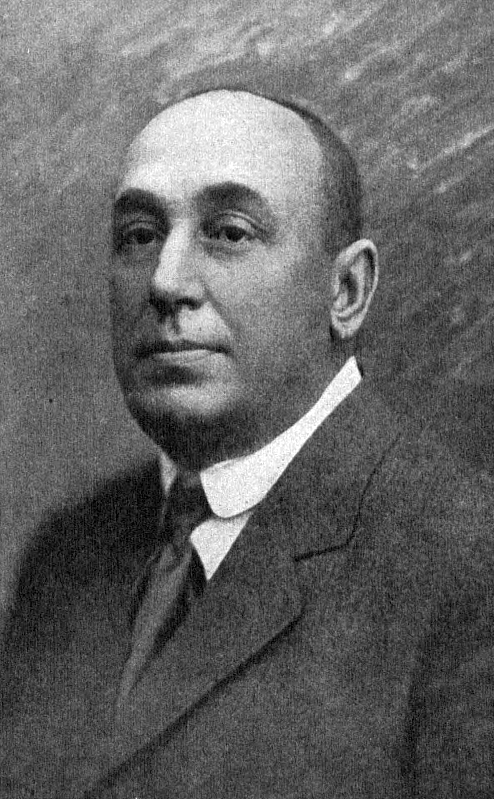
- Sergei Golovin SA
- Born: Sergei Golovin; March 27, 1879
- Died: October 9, 1941 (aged 62)
- Occupations: Actor, film director
- Years active: 1916–1921

Sergei Golovin (Russian: Сергей Головин) was an actor. Honored Artist of the RSFSR.

== Selected filmography ==
- 1916 – Miss Peasant
- 1919 – Polikushka
- 1920 – Andzhelo
