= Eugène Goossens, père =

Belgian conductor

Eugène Goossens (25 February 1845 – 30 December 1906) was a Belgian conductor and the head of a prominent musical family.

== Biography ==
He was born in Bruges and studied music as a child at the Church of Our Lady, Bruges, then at the Bruges Conservatoire. At the age of fourteen, he was admitted to the conservatoire in Brussels, where he studied composition.

He conducted opera companies throughout Europe, moving to England in 1873. There he conducted for the company of Selina Dolaro under the management of Richard D'Oyly Carte in 1876. In May 1878, for Carte, he conducted The Sorcerer by Gilbert and Sullivan and also conducted H.M.S. Pinafore in July and August 1878, while Alfred Cellier was assisting Arthur Sullivan at the promenade concerts at Covent Garden. He also conducted a "special operatic performance" of H.M.S. Pinafore at The Crystal Palace on 6 July 1878.

Goossens became famous as a musical director of the Carl Rosa Opera Company, for whom he conducted the first English performance of Richard Wagner's Tannhäuser, in Liverpool in 1882. He became principal conductor of Carl Rosa in 1889. He conducted Rosa's company in a command performance, in November 1892, of The Daughter of the Regiment for Queen Victoria at Balmoral Castle.

He was the father of the conductor and violinist Eugène Goossens and grandfather of the conductor and composer Sir Eugene Goossens, the harpists Marie and Sidonie Goossens and the oboist Léon Goossens.

In the early 1890s, he moved to Liverpool, where he founded the "Goossens Male-voice Choir," served as organist and choirmaster at St. Anne's Roman Catholic Church and taught singing. He died in Liverpool in 1906 at the age of 61.

== Goossens family tree ==
- Eugène Goossens, père
  - Eugène Goossens, fils (1867–1958) (aka Eugène Goossens II), French-born conductor and violinist
    - Eugene Aynsley Goossens (1893–1962) (aka Eugène Goossens III), English conductor and composer
    - Marie Goossens (1894–1991), English harpist
    - Adolphe Goossens (1896–1916), English horn player, killed at the Battle of the Somme
    - Léon Goossens (1897–1988), English oboist
    - Sidonie Goossens (1899–2004), English harpist
