= Louis Cohen (conductor) =

English conductor and violinist (1894–1956)

Louis Cohen

Louis Cohen (17 September 1894 – 25 November 1956) was an English violinist and conductor. After playing for many years with the Hallé Orchestra, he formed the Merseyside Symphony Orchestra. Cohen presented free concerts for the armed forces in Britain during World War II, and afterwards, he conducted the Palestine Symphony Orchestra for three seasons before returning to Britain.

== Biography ==
Cohen was born in Liverpool, England, and trained at Liverpool College of Music and the Royal Manchester College of Music.

After overseas service in World War I, he joined the Hallé Orchestra. In 1932 he formed the Merseyside Symphony Orchestra, which later formed the basis of the Liverpool Philharmonic Society's permanent orchestra, of which Cohen was a frequent guest conductor. In 1935, he was appointed musical director for the season at Harrogate by the municipal authorities. After the outbreak of World War II, Cohen presented free concerts for members of the armed forces at St George's Hall in Liverpool. Soloists with whom he worked in this period included Moura Lympany, Clifford Curzon and Eileen Joyce.

Cohen conducted the Palestine Symphony Orchestra, the forerunner of the Israel Philharmonic Orchestra, for three seasons after World War II. His first concert in Jerusalem, on 7 May 1945, coincided with the announcement of the German surrender. He programmed some English works including Elgar's Enigma Variations which were played not only in the three main cities of Jerusalem, Haifa and Tel-Aviv, but in some of the agricultural settlements. Later programmes included Elgar's Serenade for strings, Bax's Tintagel and Frederick Delius's On Hearing the First Cuckoo in Spring. Symphonies in his programmes included Mozart's Haffner, Tchaikovsky's fourth, Dvořák's New World, Prokofiev's Classical, Beethoven's fifth and Brahms's fourth.

Cohen died in Liverpool in 1956 at the age of 62.
