= Marie Goossens =

English harpist (1894–1991)

Marie Henriette Goossens OBE (11 August 1894 – 18 December 1991) was an English harpist, a member of the famous Goossens musical family. Her father was the conductor and violinist Eugène Goossens, and her younger sister Sidonie Goossens was also a harpist. Her brothers were Eugene (composer), Adolphe (horn player) and Léon (oboist).

== Early life ==
Born in London, Marie Goossens was taught at the Royal College of Music by Miriam Timothy and made her professional debut as a harpist in Liverpool in 1910. After playing for Diaghilev's Ballets Russes at Covent Garden in 1919 she became principal harpist with Henry Wood's Queen's Hall Orchestra between 1920 and 1930, during which time she also played as a soloist and early recording artist.

In 1932, Goossens joined the London Philharmonic Orchestra. She continued working through the war, caring for two children and two stepchildren on her own following her husband's death. She played with the London Symphony Orchestra from 1940 until 1959.

== Light entertainment ==
As well as concert music, Goossens was happy to perform and record light music and frequently appeared on radio and television from the pre-war years. She composed and performed the original harp introduction to the long-running radio soap opera Mrs Dale's Diary in 1948, played for many of the Carry On series of comedy films, and for Julie Andrews and Petula Clark when they were still child stars. During the 1950s and 1960s, Goossens performed for many well-known names in light music and jazz: Stanley Black, Frank Chacksfield (solo harp on his 1953 hit "Ebb Tide"), Robert Farnon, Ted Heath, Geoff Love, Mantovani and Sidney Torch. She played with Tony Bennett at the Talk of the Town and Count Basie at the Odeon, Hammersmith.

== Teaching and later career ==
In 1954 Marie Goossens became Professor of Harp at the Royal College of Music, where she stayed until 1967. Among her many pupils were John Marson (1932-2007) and David Snell. She acted as coach for the National Youth Orchestra of Wales between 1965 and 1990.

From 1972 she was with the London Mozart Players, but for many of her later years she continued as an active freelance player and teacher, featuring on many pop recordings. She finally giving up playing in the mid-80s due to illness.

== Personal life and death ==
In 1926, she married Frederick Laurence, initially a composer and musical advisor to EMI who ended up as the impoverished librarian of the Proms and personnel manager for the National Symphony Orchestra, Royal Philharmonic and the London Philharmonic Orchestras. There were two children, Anthony (1928-2018) and Jean (1930-2009). Frederick Laurence died suddenly on 3 May 1942.

Goossens was awarded an OBE in 1984, and her colourful autobiography, Life on a Harp String was published three years later. She died in Dorking on 18 December 1991, at the age of 97.
