= W. H. Jude =

English composer and organist (1851–1922)

William Herbert Jude
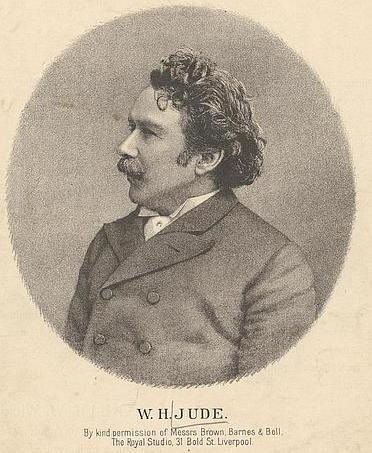
- Jude in 1891

Background information
- Born: September 1851; Westleton, Suffolk, England
- Died: 8 August 1922 (aged 70–71) London, England
- Occupation: Composer
- Instrument: Organ

William Herbert Jude (1851– 8 August 1922), usually credited as W.H. Jude, was an English composer and organist. Born in Westleton, Suffolk, in September 1851, his parents later moved to Norfolk. He was a precocious child, and attended Wisbech Grammar School where records note that by the age of eight he was composing incidental music for school plays. He later attended Liverpool Organ School and Liverpool College of Music, also becoming college principal for a while.

By 1881, Jude was listed in the census as living at 33 Oxford Street, Mount Pleasant, Liverpool, with his wife Catherine. At this time, he was organist for the Blue Coat Hospital and Stretford Town Hall, near Manchester, as well as being a lecturer and teacher. As a recitalist, he was asked to "open" more than 1000 new organs across the UK, Ireland and Australia. He was frequently referred to as "the most brilliant organist of the day".

Christian texts and topics appear frequently in Jude's compositions. He was an admirer of the British evangelist Rodney "Gipsy" Smith, and published a collection of Gipsy Smith's Favourite Solos in 1903. Jude appears to have supported the temperance movement; "Fight the Drink", a song by Jude with lyrics by A. Sargant, appears in a collection of his music with the note that it was "sung at the Crystal Palace Festival by 5000 people".

Between 1890 and 1894, Jude embarked on a tour of Australia and New Zealand. Beginning in 1904, he served as editor for several musical periodicals, including Monthly Hymnal, Minister of Music, and Music and the Higher Life. He also compiled several hymnbooks; Mission Hymns in 1911 and Festival Hymns in 1916. He died on 8 August 1922 in London.

== Compositions ==
As a composer, he mainly focused on vocal music, and wrote at least two operettas; Innocents Abroad, or Going Over to Rome in 1882 and The Mighty Deep in 1917, as well as numerous individual songs and hymn tunes. Although nearly all of his music has slipped into obscurity, at the turn of the 20th century, his ballad "The Mighty Deep" from his 1917 operetta of the same name was very popular.

Other nautical ballads include "'Neath the Rolling Tide", "Every Inch a Sailor", "The Skipper" and "Plymouth Sound". Other songs include "The Trumpeter's March" "La Garde Suisse" "Cavalry March" "Behold! I Stand at the Door", "Consecration", "I Gave My Life For Thee", "The Landlord's Daughter" and "The Young Brigade". He also composed organ music and piano solos such as the Festival March in C. Many of his compositions are of the Victorian parlour music variety.

He was a keen writer of high-Victorian hymns, and his hymn tune "Galilee" was widely printed and applied to several texts, although notably "Jesus Calls Us" by Cecil Frances Alexander. In 1900, Jude published a collection of his own hymn tunes entitled Music and the Higher Life. Several of his hymn settings – such as for "Onward, Christian Soldiers", "Eventide" and "Hark! The Herald Angels Sing" – are better known in alternative settings.

Jude wrote the words of a few hymns. "Speak to me, Lord, and calm this silent grief", "The Crowning Day", and "That beautiful city of rest ... The home of those I love best". The themes suggest writing out of personal experience of bereavement. His hymn tunes generally show great attention to the words, as seen in his settings of "Depth of Mercy" (Charles Wesley), "Rock of Ages" (A. M. Toplady), and "When I Survey the Wondrous Cross" (Isaac Watts).

== Bibliography ==
- Henniker, Maurice, Illustrated life of W. H. Jude : organist, composer, descriptive vocalist, and Ambassador for Christ (London: Jarrold & Sons, 1900) Bib ID 611927.
- Jude, William Herbert, Gipsy Smith's Favourite Solos (London: Country life, 1903).
- Jude, William Herbert, Music and the Higher Life: A Collection of Descriptive and Choral Hymns, Solos and Choruses (London: Reid Bros, 1900).
