= Royal College of Music war memorial =

War memorial in London

Coordinates: 51.49973°N 0.17714°W

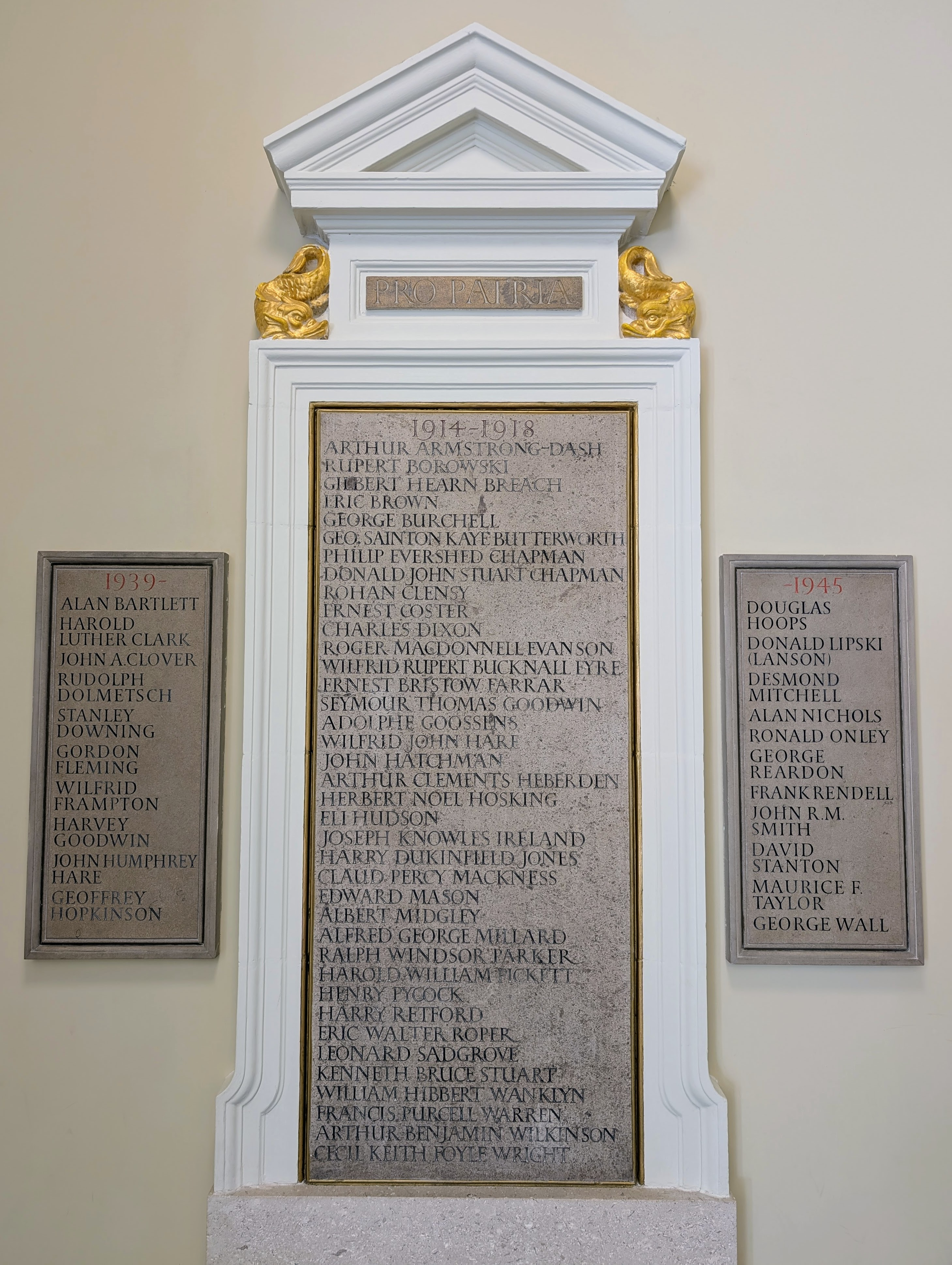
The memorial

The Royal College of Music War Memorial is situated in the entrance hall of the Royal College of Music building, Prince Consort Road in South Kensington London. The original central panel lists 38 RCM students and staff who lost their lives in World War I. 18 of them were organists. The memorial was unveiled on 10 November 1922 by Lord Justice Younger. A further 21 who died in the Second World War were added after 1945 in two small panels either side of the original central panel.

Obituaries of many of those listed on the memorial were printed in wartime editions of the RCM Magazine.

== First World War ==
- Arthur Armstrong-Dash (1883–1918), violinist, Lancashire Fusiliers, 12th Battalion
- Rupert Borowski (died 1918), violinist, private
- Gilbert Hearn Breach (1896–1916), Royal Fusiliers, Public Schools Battalion
- Eric Francis Brown (1890–1917), organist and choirmaster at Emmanuel Church, South Hampstead, Captain, Wiltshire Regiment.
- George H. Burchell (died 1917), flute scholar 1915, Lance-Sergeant in Belgium, Queen's Royal West Surrey
- George Butterworth, composer, Lieut., Durham Light Infantry
- Philip Evershed Chapman (1893–4 September 1915, Malta), piano, organ, composition, Royal Hampshire Regiment
- Donald John Stuart Chapman (1894–1916), 2nd Lieut., Royal Fusiliers
- Rohan Clensy (1877–1919), actor, violinist and singer
- Ernest Coster (1883–1917), organist, student 1906–10, Captain, Royal Welsh Fusiliers
- Charles Dixon (died 1917)
- Roger MacDonnell Evanson (died 1917), singer, Royal West Kent Regiment
- Wilfrid Rupert Bucknall Eyre (died 1917)
- Ernest Bristow Farrer, composer, 2nd Lieut., Devonshire Regiment
- Seymour Thomas Goodwin (1890–1917), private, Suffolk Regiment
- Adolphe Goossens, horn player, 2nd Lieut., Norfolk Regiment
- Wilfrid John Hare (died Palestine, December 1917), organ and piano, London Irish Rifles
- John Hatchman (office staff), Hussars
- Arthur Clements Heberden (died 1917), organist, director of music, Marlborough College, 2nd Lieut., King's Royal Rifles
- Herbert Noel Hosking (1891–1916), singer, pianist, student 1910–14, Corporal, Middlesex Regiment
- Eli Hudson (1877–1919), principal flute London Symphony Orchestra, Lieut.
- Joseph Knowles Ireland (1885–1916), singer, Captain, Royal Fusiliers
- Harry Duckinfield Jones (1880–1915), pianist, Honourable Artillery Company
- Claud Percy Mackness (1887–1917), 2nd Lieut., Gordon Highlanders
- Edward Mason (died May 1915) cellist and conductor, husband of Jessie Grimson, Lieut., Northants Regiment
- Albert Midgley (1892–1918), organ, 2nd Lieut., Worcestershire Regiment
- Alfred George Millard (died 1917), organist, 2nd Lieut., East Surrey Regiment
- Ralph Windsor Parker (1891–1918), pianist, 2nd Lieut., Grenadier Guards
- Harold William Pickett (1890–1918), St John Ambulance Brigade Hospital, Etaples
- Henry R Pycock (died 1916), office staff, Artists' Rifles
- Harry Retford (died October 1917), Artists' Rifles
- Eric Walter Roper (died 1916), singer, actor 2nd Lieut., Royal Fusiliers
- Leonard Sadgrove (died 1917), violin and piano, Royal Amateur Orchestral Society Scholar, private, Royal Fusiliers
- Kenneth Bruce Stuart, organist, 2nd Lieut., Durham Light Infantry
- William Hibbert Wanklyn (died 1917), 2nd Lieut., Household Brigade
- Francis Purcell Warren, violinist and composer, 2nd Lieut., South Lancashire Regiment
- Arthur Benjamin Wilkinson (died November 1916), organist, Royal Chapel Windsor Park, 2nd Lieut., Royal Sussex Regiment
- Cecil Keith Foyle Wright (1890–1918), organist of St Mary Abchurch, Cannon Street, 10th Battalion, Royal Fusiliers

== Second World War ==
- Alan Bartlett
- Harold Luther Clark
- John A Clover
- Rudolph Dolmetsch (1906–1942), harpsichordist, Regimental Bandmaster with the Royal Artillery, died in the sinking of the SS Ceramic in 1942.
- Stanley Downing
- Gordon Fleming
- Wilfrid Frampton
- Harvey Goodwin
- John Humphrey Hare
- Geoffrey Hopkinson
- Douglas Harry Mostyn Hoops (1923–1943), pianist and composer from Aberdeen, R.A.C. 6th Armoured Division, killed in North Africa
- Donald Lipski (Donald Allan Lawson), Sergeant Navigator, killed 14 September 1943 as a result of an aircraft accident
- Desmond Mitchell, Flying Officer, killed in action 24 August 1943
- Alan Nichols
- Ronald Onley, violin, student 1923–34, husband of pianist Irene Crowther, member London Symphony Orchestra
- George Reardon
- Frank Rendell
- John R M Smith
- David Stanton, Sergeant Pilot, killed 1943
- Morris F Taylor
- George Wall (d. Burma, August 1943), singing scholarship, 1937
