= Miriam Timothy =

British harpist and teacher

Miriam Timothy (24 February 1879 – 1950) was a British harpist and teacher. She was a soloist, played with many London orchestras and taught harp at the Royal College of Music.

== Life ==
Miriam Timothy was born in London on 24 February 1879, daughter of Felix Festus Timothy and Jane née Hamblin. From 1890 to 1893 she studied with John Thomas at the Royal Academy of Music, where she gained Bronze and Silver medals. She obtained a scholarship in 1893 to study at the Royal College of Music for three years, and later taught there; her students included the sisters Sidonie and Marie Goossens.

In September 1897 she appeared at a Promenade Concert at the Queen's Hall, playing a solo by John Thomas. During the following years she played solos in concerts, and took part in chamber music.

Miriam Timothy played for Queen Victoria at Osborne House; she afterwards became a member of the Queen's band, playing several times at Windsor Castle. She was one of the musicians at the Coronation of Edward VII in 1902, and the Coronation of George V in 1911.

She played with the Queen's Hall Orchestra and other orchestras. From May 1904 she was a member of the London Symphony Orchestra, and accompanied the orchestra, with conductor Arthur Nikisch, in 1912 on a concert tour of the US.

In 1920 she left London, and in the Caribbean met and married Lt-Col Robert L Deane OBE(1879–1969); he was later Commissioner of Police in Mauritius. She died there in 1950.
