= Sidonie Goossens =

English harpist

Annie Sidonie Goossens
- Born: 19 October 1899; Liscard, Wallasey, Cheshire, England
- Died: 15 December 2004 (aged 105) Reigate, Surrey, England

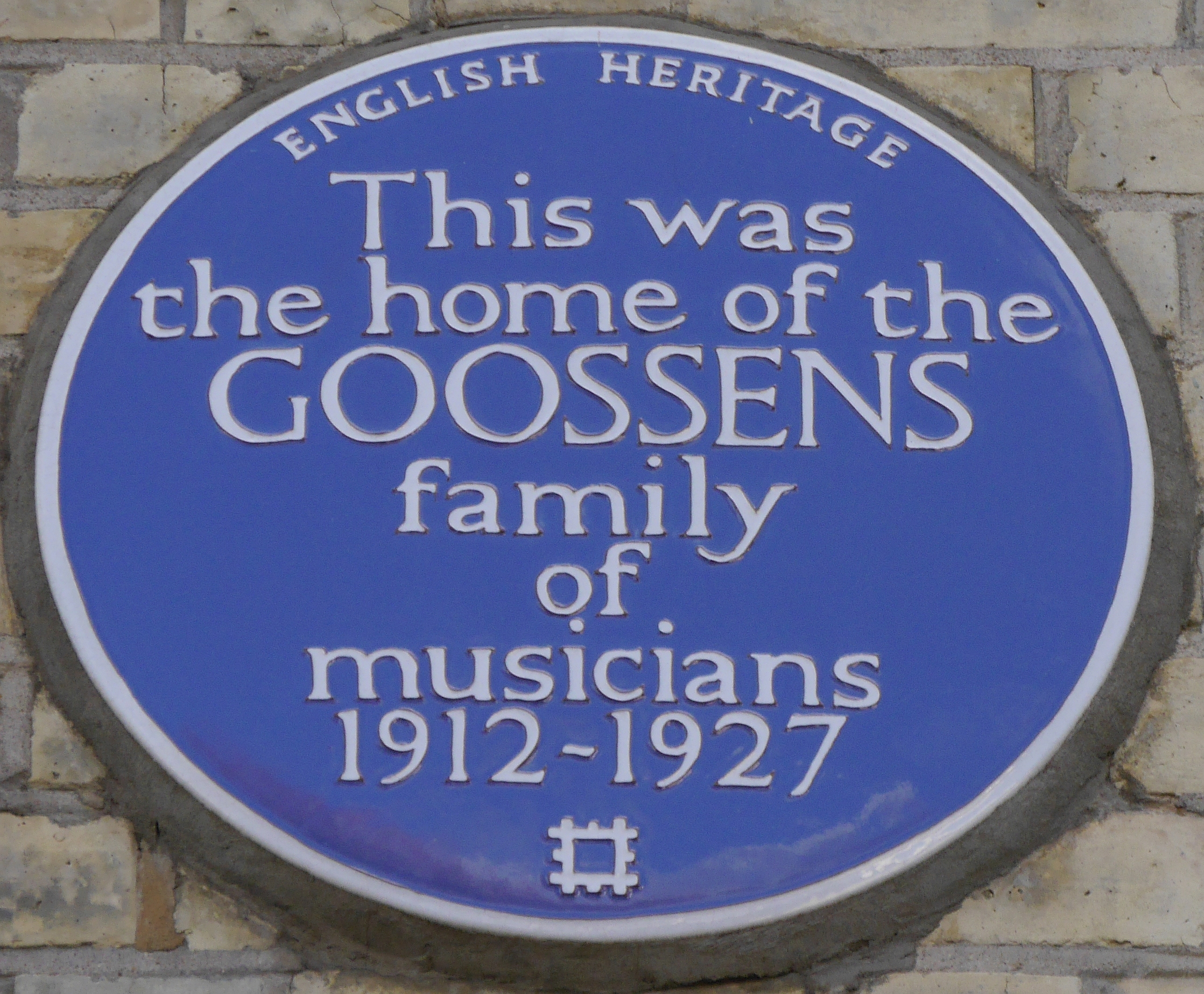
Blue plaque, 70 Edith Road West Kensington, London

Annie Sidonie Goossens OBE (19 October 1899 – 15 December 2004) was one of Britain's most enduring harpists. She made her professional debut in 1921, was a founder member of the BBC Symphony Orchestra and went on to play for more than half a century until her retirement in 1981.

== The Goossens family ==
She was born in Liscard, Wallasey, Cheshire, a member of the famous Goossens musical family that had emigrated to Britain from Belgium in the 19th century. Her father and grandfather were both conductors, both called Eugène. Her brother Sir Eugene Goossens was a composer and conductor who spent many years working in Australia as the director of the NSW Conservatorium of Music and chief conductor of the Sydney Symphony. Her brother Léon was an eminent oboist and her sister Marie Goossens was also a distinguished harpist. In 1916, her brother Adolphe, a gifted French horn player, was killed in action at the Somme at the age of 20.

== Early career ==
As a child, she wanted to become an actress but was encouraged by her father to play the harp. Taught (like her elder sister Marie) by Miriam Timothy, she was already playing in public by the age of 16. When she joined the London Symphony Orchestra in 1921, taking part in their first ever tour, she was the only female performer. In 1923 she became the first harpist to be broadcast on the radio, and followed this up in 1936 by becoming the first to be broadcast on television (with the BBC Television Orchestra, conducted by her then husband Hyam Greenbaum).

== BBC Symphony Orchestra ==
She was a founder member of the BBC Symphony Orchestra with whom she played for fifty years (1930–1980). The founder of the orchestra, Adrian Boult, engaged her as Principal Harp before the orchestra's first public concert in October 1939. She also played under guest conductors such as Arturo Toscanini, Bruno Walter and Arnold Schoenberg. She officially retired from the orchestra in 1980, the year it was celebrating its golden jubilee. At age 91 in 1991, she became the oldest person to perform at the Last Night of the Proms concert.

== Personal and family life ==
She married her first husband, the conductor, violinist and composer Hyam Greenbaum, in 1924. In the late 1920s and early 1930s their London home (5 Wetherby Gardens, SW5) became a regular meeting place for musicians, including Arnold Bax, Constant Lambert, Patrick Hadley, Spike Hughes, Alan Rawsthorne and William Walton. Greenbaum died of alcohol-related problems one day after his 41st birthday. With her second husband, Norman Millar, she moved to Reigate in Surrey, where they raised pigs and poultry at the 400-year-old Woodstock Farm, Gadbrook Road, Betchworth. She was a close personal friend of Sir Adrian Boult and Pierre Boulez, who wrote of her: 'Always her presence was reassuring, her professional conscience irreproachable, her attitude faultless. She loved her metier, her instrument. All this, really, was the reflection of her personality for which I have had from the first instant, not only the greatest admiration, but also an immense affection.'

== Final years ==
She was honoured with a MBE in 1974, and later an OBE in 1980. She retired officially from the BBC Symphony Orchestra in 1980, the year of the orchestra's Golden Jubilee. Her final performance was in 1991 during the Last Night of the Proms when she accompanied Dame Gwyneth Jones in her own arrangement of "The Last Rose of Summer". There were celebratory concerts for her 100th birthday at London's Wigmore and Royal Festival Halls. She died in Reigate, Surrey, on 15 December 2004 aged 105.
