= The Living Corpse (1929 film) =

1929 film

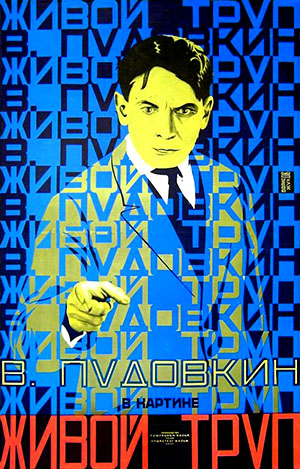
- Directed by: Fyodor Otsep
- Written by: Leo Tolstoy (play); Boris Gusman; Anatoli Marienhof; Fyodor Otsep
- Starring: Vsevolod Pudovkin; Maria Jacobini; Viola Garden
- Cinematography: Anatoli Golovnya; Phil Jutzi
- Music by: Werner Schmidt-Boelcke
- Production companies: Mezhrabpomfilm; Prometheus-Film
- Distributed by: Prometheus-Film
- Release date: 26 March 1929
- Running time: 82 minutes
- Countries: Germany; Soviet Union
- Languages: Silent; German intertitles

The Living Corpse (German: Der lebende Leichnam, Russian: Живой труп, romanized: Zhivoy trup) is a 1929 German-Soviet silent drama film directed by Fyodor Otsep and starring Vsevolod Pudovkin, Maria Jacobini and Viola Garden. It is based on Leo Tolstoy's play The Living Corpse that posthumously debuted in 1911. It was made as a co-production between the Russian-based Mezhrabpomfilm and the Communist-backed German company Prometheus Film.

== Plot ==
At the center of the action is Fyodor Protassov whose marriage with his wife Liza is largely over. As the Russian Orthodox Church does not tolerate divorce, he one day fakes his suicide so that his wife can be with her lover Viktor Karenin. While he begins to lead a life of illegality and subterfuge which despite his new companion does not make him content, this decisive step to the fake death which has made him a "living corpse" is no real happiness.

One day it is found out that Fyodor is still alive and that Liza is guilty of bigamy. She is accused and a sentence is imminent for her "offense", which is actually Fyodor's offense. Protassov, who never wanted to take this so far, decides therefore to make one last sacrifice: he now completes the deceived act and actually commits suicide by shooting himself.

== Cast ==
- Vsevolod Pudovkin as Fyodor Protasov
- Maria Jacobini as Yelizaveta Andreyevna Protasova (Liza)
- Viola Garden as Sasha (Liza's sister)
- Julia Serda as Anna Pavlovna
- Nato Vachnadze as Masha, a gypsy
- Gustav Diessl as Viktor Mikhajlovich Karenin
- Vera Maretskaya as Prostitute
- Daniil Vvedenskiy as Artem'ev (The Good Spirit)
- Vladimir Uralsky as Petushkov
- Boris Barnet as Sailor in tavern
- Carola Höhn
- Karl Junge-Swinburne
- Porfiri Podobed
- Pyotr Repnin
- Sylvia Torf

== Bibliography ==
- Taylor, Richard. Film Propaganda: Soviet Russia and Nazi Germany. I.B.Tauris, 1998.
