= Wise Music Group =

Global music publisher

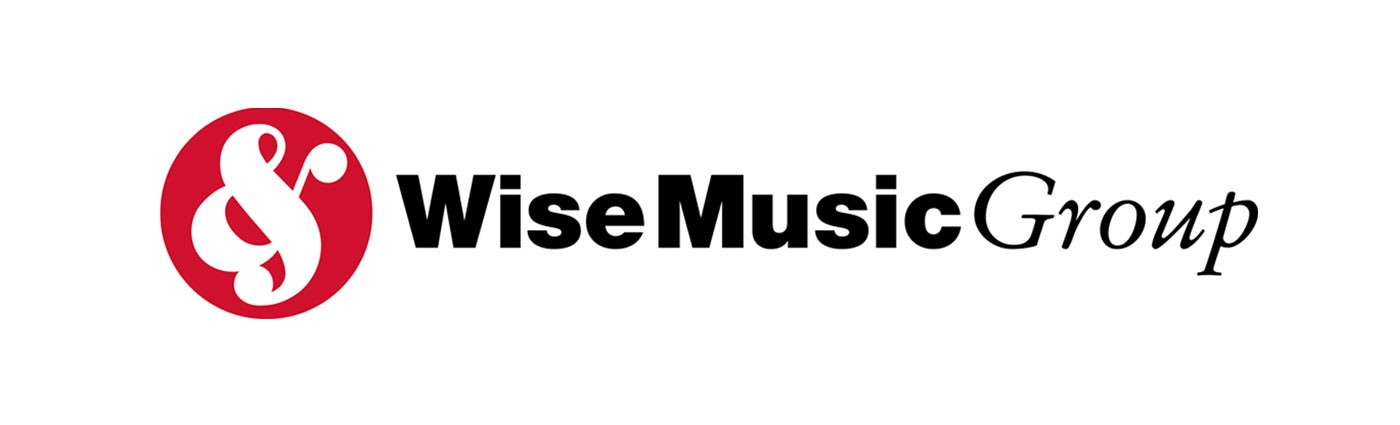
- Type: Private
- Industry: Music publishing
- Headquarters: Berners Street, London, United Kingdom
- Area served: Worldwide
- Key people: Robert Wise (Chairman & Managing Director); Chris Butler (Head of Publishing & Rights)
- Website: wisemusic.com

Wise Music Group is a global music publisher, with headquarters in Berners Street, London. Robert ("Bob") Wise, an American based in Britain, founded The Music Sales Group as a printed sheet music specialist and copyright acquisition company in the early 1970s. Its headquarters was in London. His sons Tomas Wise (CEO, Wise Music USA) and Marcus Wise (Group Head of Media) are also involved in the business. In February 2020 the company changed its name to Wise Music Group.

== Acquisitions ==
In 1999, Music Sales Group acquired Margun Music and Gun-Mar from Gunther Schuller.

In 2014, Wise Music Group (as The Music Sales Group) acquired French classical music publisher Éditions Alphonse Leduc. Éditions Alphonse Leduc publishes classical music by French composers including Jacques Ibert, Henri Dutilleux, Olivier Messiaen, Francis Poulenc, and Joseph Canteloube. It also publishes operatic works by Italian composers Gioachino Rossini and Vincenzo Bellini, and works by Muzio Clémenti, Johannes Brahms, and Pyotr Tchaikovsky.

In March 2017, The Music Sales Group acquired disco publisher Bleu Blanc Rouge from Belgian record producer and songwriter Jean Kluger. In April 2018, Music Sales sold its physical and online print divisions, including Musicroom, to Milwaukee-based publisher Hal Leonard for $50 million. Hal Leonard will continue to distribute Wise Music's publishing catalogue worldwide.

In April 2023, Wise Music Group acquired a controlling interest in Edition Peters Group, a publishing house founded in Leipzig in 1800. Shortly after, Faber Music announced an agreement between Wise Music Group and them for the printed music business, making Faber Music the worldwide representative of the entire sales catalogue of Edition Peters.

Wise Music's catalogue of music includes classic hit singles such as "Tainted Love" by Soft Cell, "My Sharona" by The Knack, and "The Twist" by Chubby Checker, among others.

=== Chester Music ===
Chester Music is a British publisher of printed music specializing in classical composition and educational music of the 20th and 21st centuries. J & W Chester Ltd was founded in the 1860s in Brighton, Sussex by Joseph and William Chester. It became important for promoting modernist composers. For example, it was the publisher of works by Manuel de Falla.

=== MusicFirst ===
MusicFirst is the Digital Education Division of Wise Music Group, specializing in educational music software. In 2025 Wise Music Group sold its digital education division to Achieve Partners.

=== Novello & Co ===
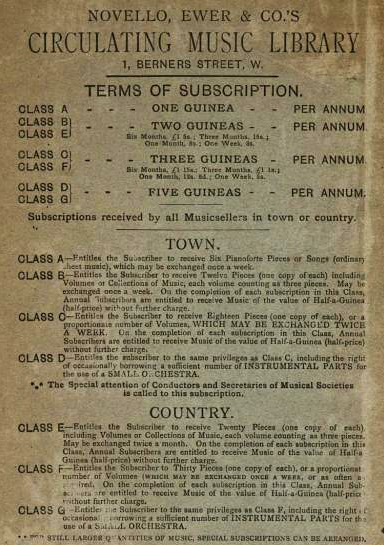
Advertisement for Novello, Ewer & Co. circulating music library, London (1890)

Novello & Co is a London-based printed music publishing company specializing in classical music, particularly choral repertoire. It was founded in 1811 by Vincent Novello. August Jaeger of the firm was a friend of Edward Elgar. It was acquired by Robert Wise (Wise Music Group) in 1993 for £2.5m.

=== Schirmer Theatrical ===
Schirmer Theatrical is Wise Music Group's concert and theatrical production company, specializing in film with live orchestra and high-end non-classical symphonic concerts.

== Selected imprints ==
- Acorn (pennywhistles)
- Amsco Publications
- Ariel Publications (classical guitar only)
- E. J. Arnold & Son, Limited (recorder books)
- Ashley Publications Inc.

- Schuberth & Co., Inc.
- Larrabee Publications
- Lewis Music Publishing Co.
- Heritage Publications, Inc.
- Kammen Music Co.

- Bosworth Music GmbH, Berlin
- Campbell Connelly, founded by Jimmy Campbell and Reg Connelly
- Carlanita Music Company LLC, founded after the death Carlos Chávez by his daughter, Ana Chávez Ortiz), G. Schirmer, selling agent
- Chester Music Limited
- Eaton Music
- Embassy Music, founded by Tommy Dorsey
- Edition Wilhelm Hansen
- F & B Goodwin, Goodwin & Tabb
- Le Chant du Monde
- Nancy Music Company Inc., books of Chez "Bugs" Bower; né Maurice D. Bower; born 1922
- Node Records
- Noel Gay Music Company, founded by Noel Gay
- Novello & Co., Ltd., London
- Oak Publications, folk music and pennywhistles books
- Omnibus Press
- Passantino Manuscript Papers
- Première Music Group
  - Éditions Alphonse Leduc
  - Éditions Choudens (fr)
  - Éditions Bleu Blanc Rouge, founded by Jean Kluger
  - Éditions Musicales Transatlantiques (fr), acquired in 2009 by Music Sales Group
- Rhinegold Education, a division acquired from Rhinegold Publishing by Music Sales Group in 2010
- G. Schirmer Inc. (subsidiary)

- Associated Music Publishers
- J. Curwen & Sons Limited London
- Boston Music Company, founded in 1885 by Gustav Schirmer, Jr. (1864–1907)
- Schirmer Trade Books

- Shawnee Press, acquired by Music Sales Group. in 1989; sold, with Music Sales Group., in 2009 to Hal Leonard Corporation
- Sparta Florida Music Group, founded by Hal Shaper
- Storyville Records
- UME (Unión Musical Ediciones S.L.), founded in Bilbao in 1900; acquired by Music Sales Group in 1990
- Wise Publications
- Yorktown Music Press
