= Liverpool College of Music =

Liverpool College of Music was an academy for classical musicians that existed between around 1884 and 1911, originally at 11 Hardman Street. The building was first known as the Meyerbeer Hall and was opened on 31 December 1867. It was also used by Liverpool Spiritualist Church from 4 June 1876 to 1885 before becoming the College. By 2020 the building had become the 'Hard Wok Café'.

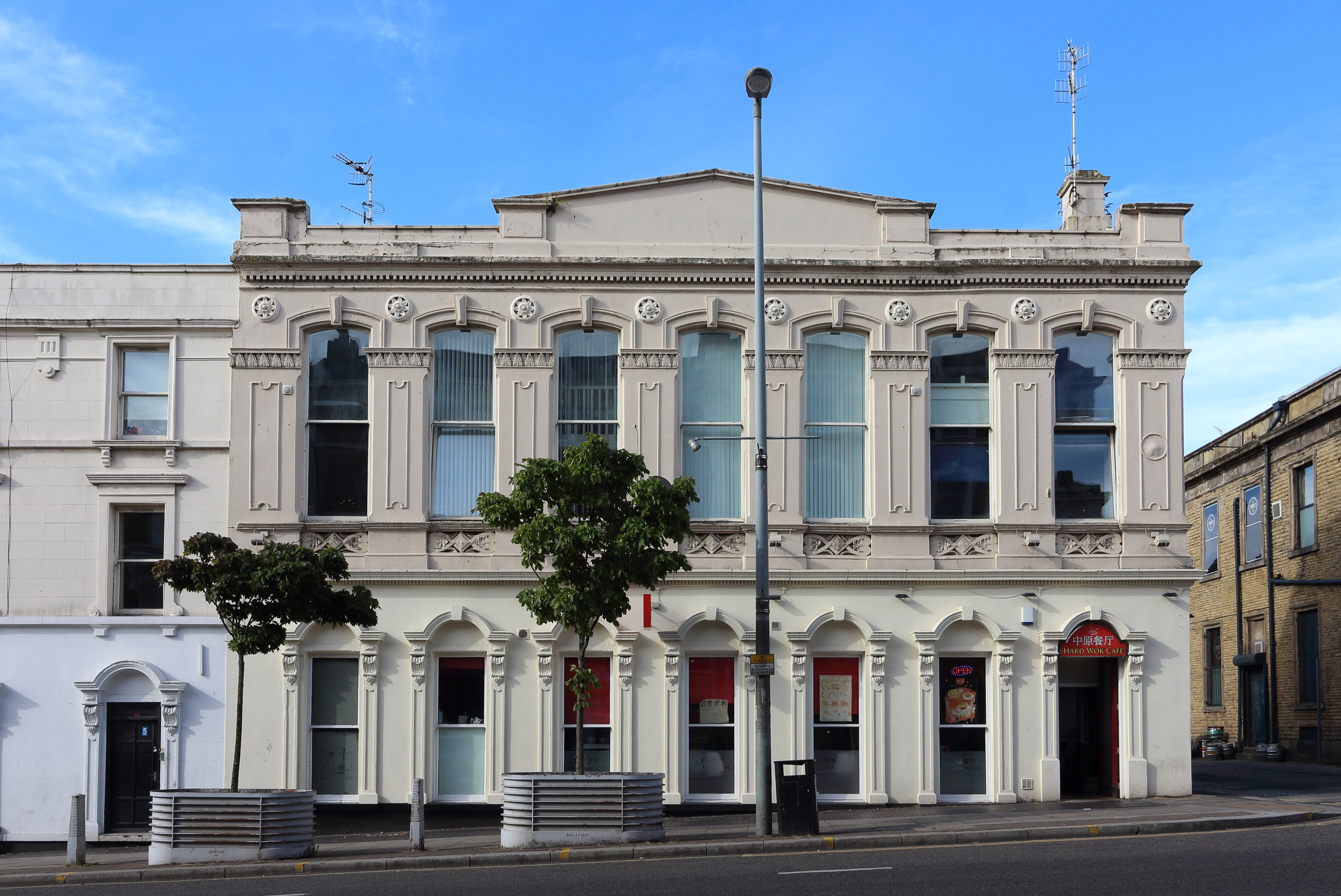
11 Hardman Street, Liverpool

The College appeared to change name and location numerous times. Although some records refer to 'since 1884' and others to 'established in 1895', there is a report of the 'new Music School, Liverpool (limited)' opening on 21 January 1892, and also a tenth-anniversary concert (for the College) on 10 November 1902. The decision to change from 'School' to 'College' was taken around May 1896.

During its existence, the College moved first to 98 Upper Parliament Street (a building whose freehold had been bought in 1880 by the Liverpool Art Club Building Co., Ltd to rent out, originally, to Liverpool Art Club; it was renovated in 1881 to incorporate a new 60 ft gallery designed by W. & G. Audsley, who were LAC members), and then, sometime after 1895, to Canning Street. A directory from 1900 shows the Liverpool College of Music (Ltd) registered at 98 Upper Parliament Street, while Hardman Street is instead shown as home of the Liverpool Conservatoire of Music (also run by Alex J. Phipps: see below). A Liverpool Institute of Music (in Mount Pleasant) and Liverpool School of Music (in Bedford Street) are also shown (as is, coincidentally, Richard Francis Lloyd).

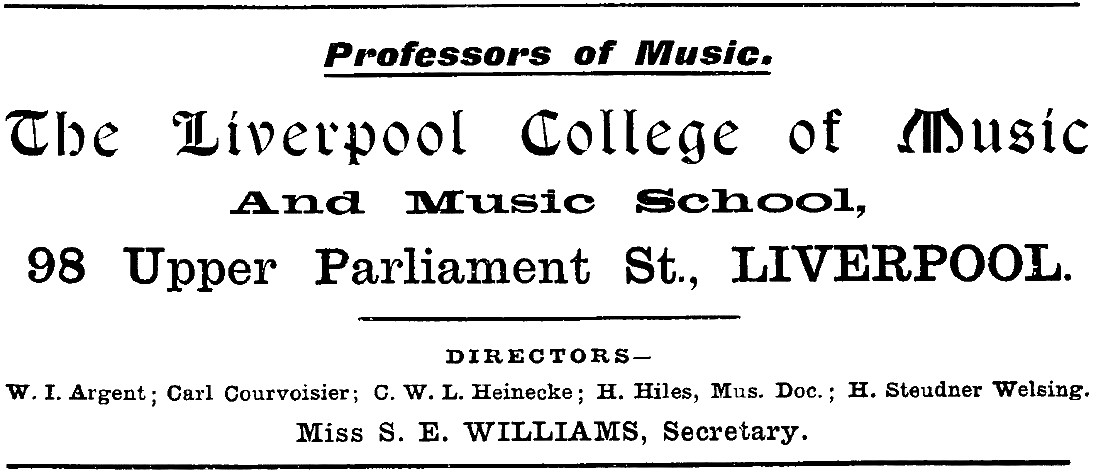
A 1900 advertisement for Liverpool College of Music.

By 1901 Phipps was advertising the Conservatoire as having 'forty professors' and multiple establishments in London and Manchester as well as Liverpool. The Conservatoire appeared to offer examinations throughout the country. By 1907 he was also advertising a National Society of Musicians.

However, by October 1910 the College was already bemoaning a lack of suitable premises and scholarships, leading promising students to go elsewhere, and eventually it closed in January 1911 due to lack of funds.

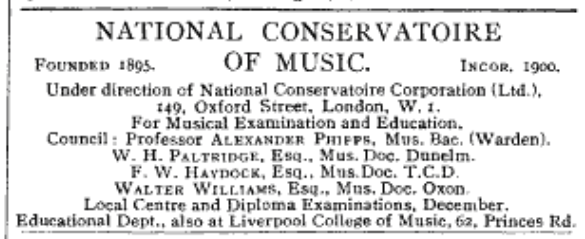
A 1920 advert showing the continued use of the name Liverpool College of Music

However, Phipps continued to use the name for many years afterwards: an October 1912 advertisement for the National Conservatoire of Music, Ltd lists (alongside a London Office at 149 Oxford Street) branches at "Liverpool College of Music, 44 Princes Rd; & Manchester". As late as 1920, this National Conservatoire of Music (now "under the direction of National Conservatoire Corporation Ltd") was still listing its "Educational Dept" as being "also at Liverpool College of Music, 62 Princes Rd".

== Staff and alumni ==
Names associated with the College include some that are internationally renowned, while others are better known on a local level or within specific genres:

- Sir Thomas Beecham
- Geoffrey Gilbert
- Eugene Aynsley Goossens
- Léon Goossens
- Frederic Austin
- Louis Cohen (violinist, conductor, founder of Liverpool Philharmonic)
- W. H. Jude (also college principal)
- Alexander James Phipps (organist; also college principal etc.)
- William Ignatius Argent (organist, critic, educator; also co-founder)
- Carl Courvoisier (violinist, violist, teacher, conductor, co-founder and principal)
- Herman Steudner-Welsing (pianist, composer, also chairman)
- Isidor Cohn (pianist)
- Frank Shea (conductor)
- Vincent Needham senior (flautist)
- Albert Cunnington (flautist)
- Charles Ross (violinist)
- John Ross (conductor, teacher; co-founder and director)
- Ella Leyland (pianist)
- Richard Francis Lloyd (organist, composer)
- Arthur William Robinson (organist)
- Joseph Raymond Tobin (teacher)
- Sarah Procter (teacher)
- Maggie Bennett
- The father of T'Pau singer Carol Decker
