= Nikolai Kostromskoy =

Russian actor

- Born: Nikolai Feodosiyevich Chaleyev; 5 July 1874; Saint Petersburg, Russian Empire
- Died: 3 November 1938 (aged 64); Moscow, RSFSR, Soviet Union
- Occupations: Actor, theater director, pedagogue
- Years active: 1902–1938

Nikolai Feodosiyevich Kostromskoy (Chaleyev) (Russian: Николай Феодосиевич Костромской (Чалеев); 5 July 1874 – 3 November 1938) was a Soviet and Russian stage actor, director and pedagogue. People's Artist of the RSFSR (1937).

== Selected filmography ==
- 1919 — Polikushka
- 1920 — Domestic Agitator

== Awards and honors ==
- Honored Artist of the RSFSR (1928)
- People's Artist of the RSFSR (1937)
- Order of the Red Banner of Labour (September 23, 1937)
