= Goodwin & Tabb =

British orchestral music library and publishers)

Goodwin & Tabb was a London-based music hire library that dates back to 1826. It moved into music publishing in 1906, was amalgamated with J. Curwen & Sons in 1924, and from 1986 was part of the Music Sales Group. Since 2018 it has been owned by Hal Leonard.

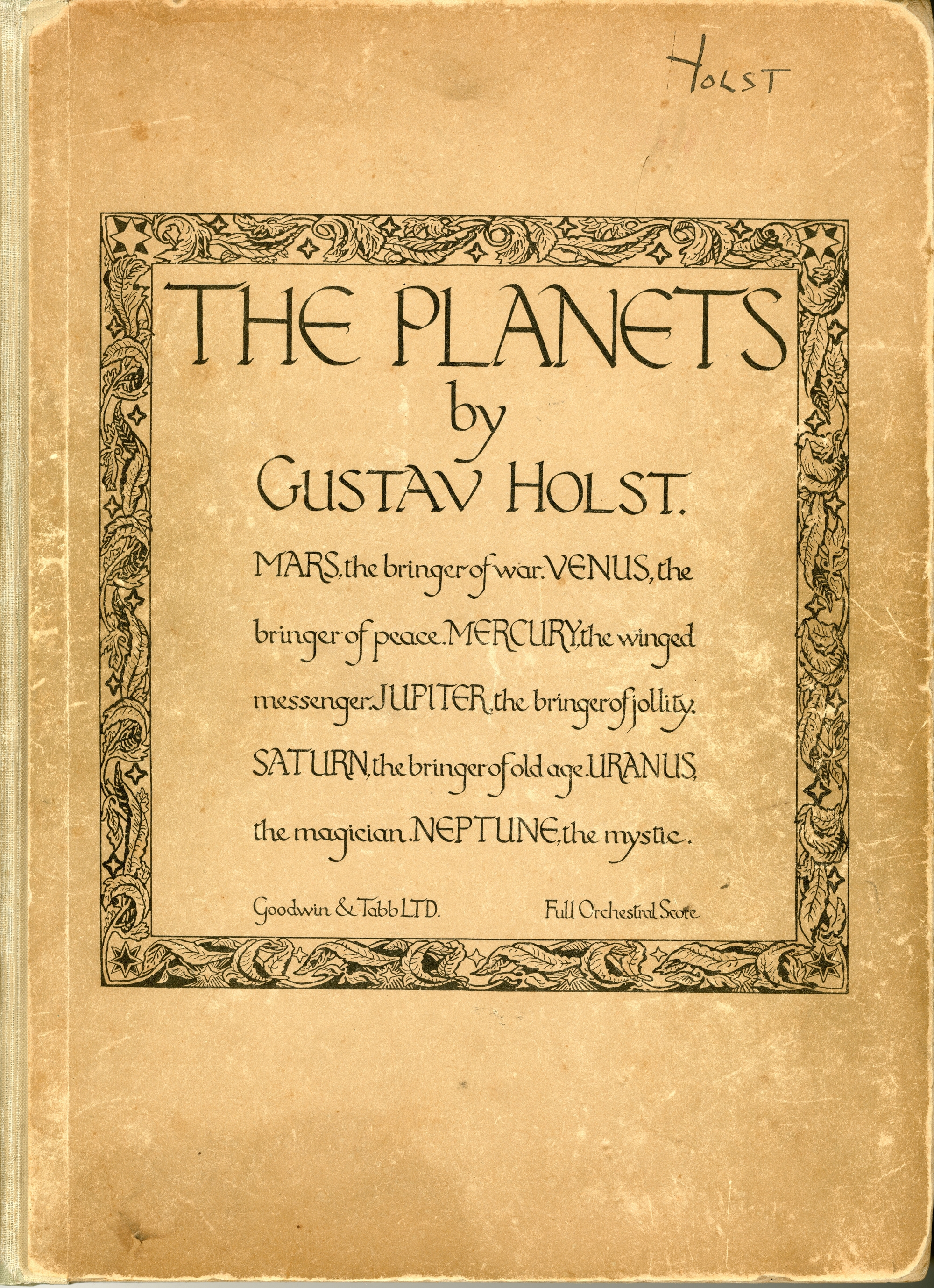
First edition orchestral score, 1921

== Orchestral score and parts hire ==
The company began as an orchestral music hire library in 1826, hiring out scores and orchestral parts to performers on behalf of publishers. Founder William V Goodwin handed the business over to his son Robert Felix Goodwin in the 1870s. Richard Prestridge Tabb married William's only daughter in 1875 and became the partner of Robert in the following year. Hire material bound in distinctive orange or buff covers became familiar to UK orchestras for multiple decades.

== Music publishing ==
The original 71 Great Queen Street offices were vacated in 1906 for 34 Percy Street, when the company first began publishing contemporary British music. By then Robert's son Felix Goodwin was in charge. The first new music published by the firm was by William Hurlstone. Other composers on its books in the early days included Joseph Holbrooke, Frank Bridge and Thomas Dunhill. In the 1920s the company published the first edition full orchestral score of Holst's The Planets, though only 200 copies were printed. (There was also a more widely available miniature score). Other composers published in the 1920s were Algernon Ashton, Arthur Bliss, Rutland Boughton, Cecil Dudley, Armstrong Gibbs, Herbert Howells, Frederick Laurence (an employee of the company from 1916) and Alec Rowley.

During and after World War 1 the library became one of the primary music resources for Henry Wood's Queen's Hall Promenade Concerts. Frederick Laurence was effectively the Proms music librarian from 1916. In 1921 Felix Goodwin expanded the music lending library to deal with the manuscript scores and orchestral parts of unpublished works by many British composers of the time, under the name "The Robert Goodwin Library of Manuscripts" to commemorate his father. Composers were invited to deposit their MSS. in the library and the firm would advertise them in printed lists and negotiate for the hire of copies.

Felix Goodwin died in 1935. As Havergal Brian - who worked at the company as editor and copyist - pointed out in his obituary of Felix in 1935, the financial rewards of publishing British music were slim. "There was little response at that time from the British public...he knew that the chances were mostly against them, but he was willing to go down with them when the trial came".

== Amalgamation ==
In 1924 the catalogues of F & B Goodwin (as the publishing arm was renamed) and J Curwen & Sons were amalgamated, with Felix Goodwin joining Curwen. Things slowed down in the 1930s and 1940s, with only a few new works published under the Goodwin imprint by composers including Granville Bantock and Leslie Bridgewater published. After the war the offices were at 36-38 Dean Street. J Curwen & Sons was acquired by G Schirmer Ltd in 1969 and from 1986 Schirmer became part of the Music Sales Group.

Separately, the Goodwin & Tabb orchestral hire division was acquired by Novello in 1971. Novello was acquired by Music Sales in 1993. Music Sales sold off its printed music division to the American publisher Hal Leonard in 2018.
