= Yuri Zhelyabuzhsky =

Russian and Soviet cinematographer, film director, screenwriter and animator

- Юрий Желябужский
- Born: 24 December 1888; Tiflis, Russian Empire
- Died: 24 October 1955 (aged 66); Moscow, Russian SFSR, Soviet Union
- Occupations: Cinematographer, director
- Years active: 1916–1953

Yuri Andreyevich Zhelyabuzhsky (Russian: Юрий Андреевич Желябужский; 24 December [O.S. 12 December] 1888 – 24 October 1955) was a Russian and Soviet cinematographer, film director, screenwriter and animator, film theorist and professor at VGIK.

== Early years ==
Zhelyabuzhsky was born into a noble Russian family. His mother Maria Andreyeva (born Yurkovskaya) was a famous stage actress and revolutionary; she also came from a theatrical family of Fyodor Aleksandrovich Fyodorov-Yurkovsky who served as the main director of the Alexandrinsky Theatre and Maria Pavlovna Leleva, an actress of mixed German-Estonian origin. Yuri's father Andrei Alekseyevich Zhelyabuzhsky was an Active State Councillor who belonged to an old noble family tree which originated in the 15th century and gave birth to a number of prominent high-ranking officials and diplomats throughout Russian history.

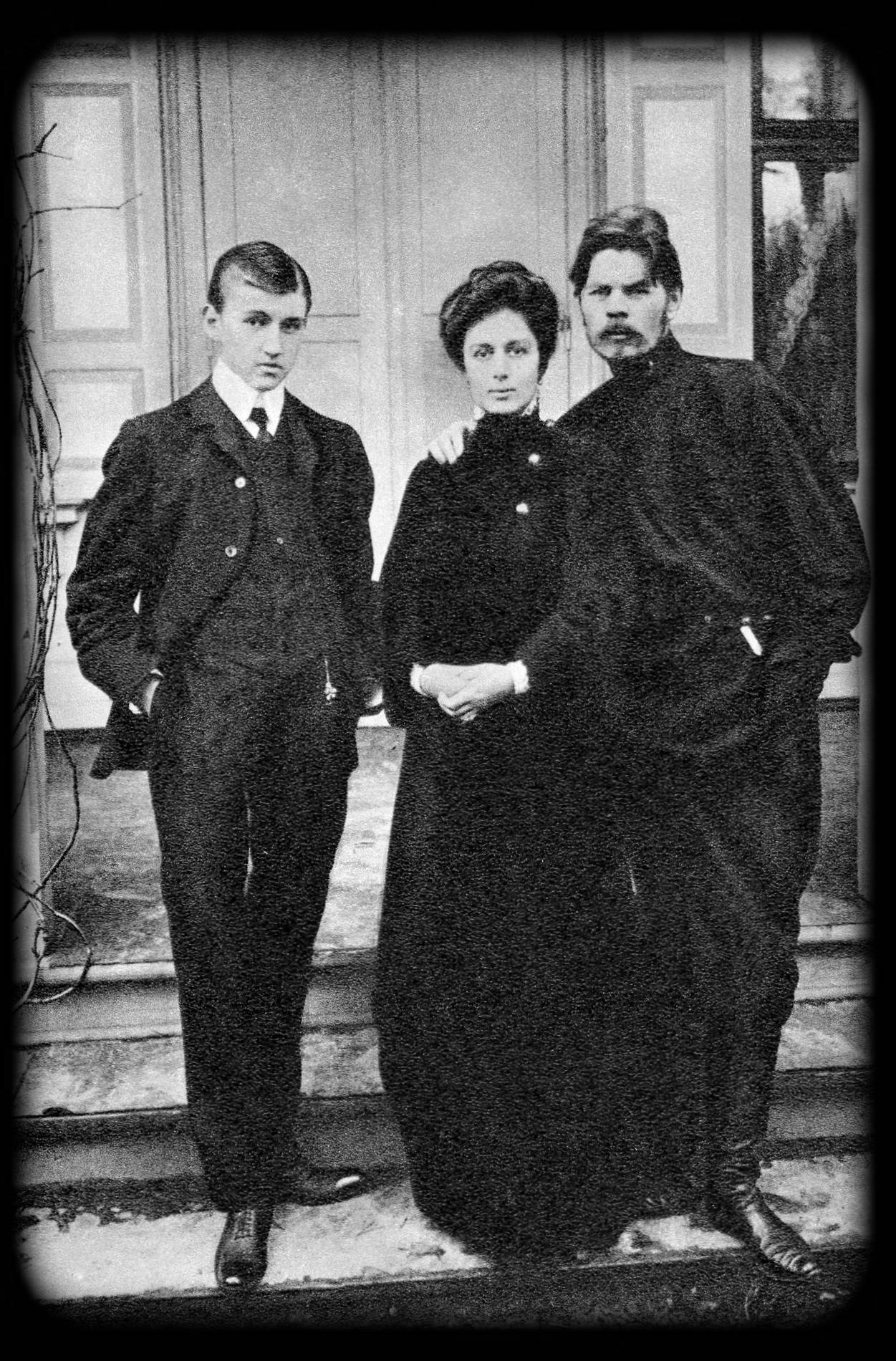
Yuri Zhelyabuzhsky with his mother Maria Andreyeva and Maxim Gorky, 1905

After Andrey Zhelyabuzhsky left the family, Maria Andreyeva became romantically involved with the major Bolshevik writer Maxim Gorky. Their civil union lasted for over 15 years, and Gorky officially adopted Yuri and his sister Yekaterina. They followed him on his trip to Italy in 1906. A famous series of photos that shows Vladimir Lenin playing chess with Gorky, Alexander Bogdanov and other Bolsheviks in exile was made by Zhelyabuzhsky at their Capri residence in April 1908.

== Career ==
Between 1913 and 1916 he studied at the Petrograd Peter the Great Polytechnic Institute, the shipbuilding faculty. After 1915 Yuri workedg in cinema — first as a film stock developer, then as a screenwriter for the Era company and other lesser-known collectives. In 1917 he became a member of the Rus' Film Studio (known as Mezrabpom-Rus and Mezhrabpomfilm during the Soviet days) where he had worked as a cinematographer, film director and screenwriter up until 1935.

Zhelyabuzhsky was active during both February and October Revolutions, shooting documentary chronicles of mass protests and Lenin's work in Moscow. During the Russian Civil War he and his crew traveled around the country, recording the life of Belarus, Volga and other regions. He also regularly visited the front line and was wounded in the leg at one point, which made him disabled for the rest of his life. Around the same time he got involved with Polikushka, one of the key movies of early Soviet cinema that featured distinctive camera work. Finished in 1919, it was released only in 1922.

Yuri Zhelyabuzhsky was among the founders of the All-Union State Institute of Cinematography in 1919 where he worked as an educator. In 1940 he became a professor of the cinematographer's faculty (VGIK). Author of the first Soviet educational films and theoretical publications on cinematography.

1924 saw the release of The Cigarette Girl from Mosselprom directed by Zhelyabuzhsky which became the first Soviet feature comedy film about the movie industry and the daily life of Moscow dwellers, free of agitation and revolution themes. It also introduced Igor Ilyinsky, Yuliya Solntseva, Nikolai Tseretelli and Mikhail Zharov to the big screen. All of them took part in another influential movie of 1924 — Aelita, the first science fiction blockbuster about space travel that emerged from the USSR, loosely based on Aleksey Tolstoy's novel. The camera work was conducted by Zhelyabuzhsky along with the German cinematographer Emil Schünemann.

One of his biggest successes was the 1925 screen adaptation of Alexander Pushkin's short story The Stationmaster. Praised by viewers and critics for the acting work of Ivan Moskvin and for the carefully built composition, it has been mentioned by scholars as one of the best Soviet adaptations ever since.

Yuri Zhelyabuzhsky also pioneered the fairy tale genre in the Soviet cinema. He produced a number of movies based on Russian and European folklore such as The Emperor's New Clothes (1919) based on the tale by Hans Christian Andersen, The Evening On the Eve of Ivan Kupala (1920) based on Nikolai Gogol's fairy tale and Morozko (1924) that introduced Boris Livanov to the big screen.

Around 1927 he became interested in animation and led the production of The Skating Rink (1927) — one of the first traditionally animated Soviet cartoons. The screenplay was written by the famous Russian art historian, collector, founder of the Toy Museum in Moscow Nikolai Bartram. During the same year, Zhelyabuzhsky directed Bolvashka's Adventures which became the first Soviet short that combined live action and stop motion animation. Shot in the Toy Museum, it featured a cameo appearance of Bartram.

During the Great Patriotic War Zhelyabuzhsky stayed at VGIK and was in charge of protecting the building. Since 1944 he had been principally working on documentary films — first war chronicles, then biographical films dedicated to the greatest Russian artists such as Ilya Repin (1946), Vasily Surikov (1947), Viktor Vasnetsov (1952) and others.

Yuri Zhelyabuzhsky died on October 25, 1955, at the age of 66. He was buried at the Novodevichy Cemetery in Moscow. He was survived by his wife Anna Dmokhovskaya (1892—1978), an actress of the Moscow Art Theatre, and their daughter Svetlana.

== Filmography ==
- Polikushka (1922)
- Aelita (1924)
- Morozko (1924)
- The Cigarette Girl from Mosselprom (1924)
- The Stationmaster (1925)
- The Skating Rink (1927)
- Bolvashka's Adventures (1927)

== Bibliography ==
- Derek Spring & Richard Taylor. Stalinism and Soviet Cinema. Routledge, 2013.
