= Francis Purcell Warren =

English violinist and composer (1895-1916), killed in WWI

- Born: 29 May 1895; Leamington Spa, Warwickshire, England
- Died: 3 July 1916 (aged 21)
- Education: Royal College of Music
- Occupations: Violinist; violist; composer
- Years active: 1910s
- Style: Classical
- Military career
- Allegiance: United Kingdom
- Branch: British Army
- Service years: 1914–1916
- Rank: Second lieutenant
- Units: Royal Warwickshire Regiment; 10th South Lancashire Regiment
- Conflicts: World War I; Battle of the Somme

Francis Purcell Warren (29 May 1895 – c. 3 July 1916) was a British violinist, violist and composer who was killed in World War I.

== Biography ==
Warren was born in Leamington Spa. His father, Walter James Warren, was a musician. He studied at the Royal College of Music from February 1910 and was awarded the Morley Scholarship in May of that year. While at the college, he became a close friend of Herbert Howells. Howells portrayed "Bunny" Warren in the fourth movement ("Mazurka alias Minuet") of his light orchestral suite The B's, Op. 13 (1914), alongside his friends Arthur Benjamin, Arthur Bliss and Ivor Gurney (a.k.a. "Bartholomew").

In the summer of 1914, before conscription was compulsory, Warren volunteered for war duty, joining the Royal Warwickshire Regiment as a private. After a short spell in France he returned to England and joined the 10th South Lancashire Regiment as a second lieutenant. On 3 July 1916, he was reported missing at Mons in Belgium during the Battle of the Somme. His body was not found. Warren is commemorated on the Thiepval Memorial. His name is also one of the 38 on the War Memorial at the Royal College of Music. Howells dedicated his 1917 Elegy for Viola to the memory of Warren.

His surviving works include the short motet Ave Verum, published by Richards & Co in 1912, the Benediction Service (1912, held in the British Library), the Five Short Pieces for Cello and Piano (Curwen, 1914) and the Variations on an Original Theme (originally the final movement of his String Quartet in A minor), composed circa 1914 and posthumously published by Cramer in 1927. There was also a Canon, scored for string orchestra.

An Adagio for cello and piano was intended for a sonata that remained unfinished. Walter Willson Cobbett described it as "a powerful and deeply moving piece, in which an almost prophetic foreboding seems to colour the spacious phrases". Thomas Dunhill described it as "indubitably his masterpiece".
