= Morozko (1924 film) =

1924 film

- Directed by: Yuri Zhelyabuzhsky
- Release date: 1924
- Running time: 40 minutes
- Country: Soviet Union
- Language: Silent film

Morozko is a 1924 Soviet silent fantasy film directed by Yuri Zhelyabuzhsky and based on the Russian fairy tale Father Frost.

== Plot summary ==
An old woman has a daughter she loves and a stepdaughter; she tells her husband to take the stepdaughter into the forest and leave her there for Father Frost. When Father Frost arrives he takes to her and leaves her riches. When the old man returns to collect the body of the step-daughter he is astonished and relieved to find her still alive. They return to the village where the old woman is horrified that the stepdaughter is not only still alive but rich. She orders the old man to take her beloved daughter to the forest so that Father Frost can bestow wealth on her. When Father Frost arrives, the daughter is rude to him, and Father Frost leaves her to die. The old man returned to the forest and brought the dead girl back to the village and her distressed mother. The stepdaughter marries a neighbor.

== Cast ==
- Boris Livanov
- Varvara Massalitinova
- Vasili Toporkov
- Klavdiya Yelenskaya

== Music ==
Frederick Laurence composed an entirely original film score for Morozko, which was used for live London screenings. According to Julie Brown it represents "the earliest important original score for a film screened in Britain". After this, however, Laurence returned to composing concert music, missing out on the lucrative opportunity that synchronised sound film opened up just three years later. The world premiere of the restored musical score was presented at the 14th British Silent Film Festival (2011) at the Barbican in London.
