= Alexander Sanin =

Russian actor, director and acting teacher

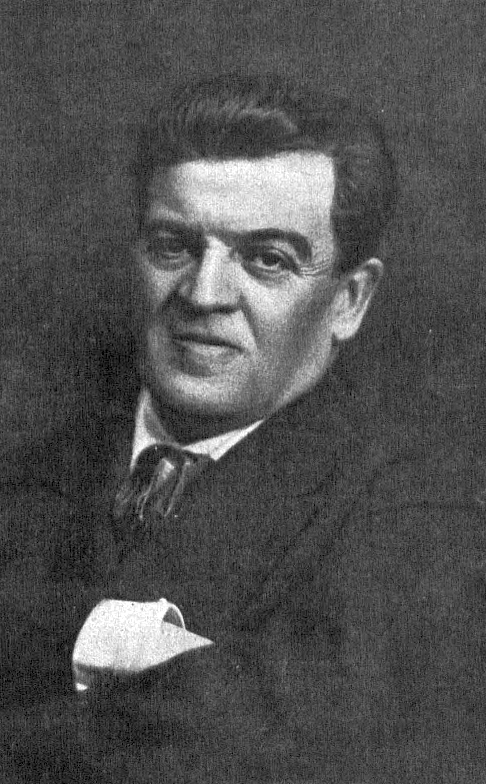
- Born: Alexander Akimovich Schoenberg; 15 April [O.S. 3 April] 1869; Berdichev, Russian Empire
- Died: 8 May 1956 (aged 87); Rome, Italy
- Occupations: Stage actor Theatre director Opera director Film director Acting teacher
- Spouse: Lika Mizinova

Alexander Akimovich Sanin (Russian: Александр Акимович Санин, né Shoenberg, Шёнберг; 15 April [O.S. 3 April] 1869 – 8 May 1956) was a Russian actor, director and acting teacher. He was a founder member of the Moscow Art Theatre and during his career directed plays, operas, and films.

== Biography ==
Born in Berdichev, Alexander Shoenberg studied history and philology at the Moscow University. After meeting Konstantin Stanislavski, who was to become the major artistic influence in his life, he made his stage debut in 1887 with Stanislavski's Society of Art and Literature, with whom he also directed crowd scenes in the Meiningen manner. In 1898, he joined the newly founded Moscow Art Theatre company, at which point he adopted the stage name "Sanin." It was there that he gave his first critically acclaimed performance, as Lup-Kleshnin in Tsar Fyodor Ioannovich by A.K. Tolstoy. In tandem with Stanislavski, Sanin also co-directed Tsar Ioannovich, along with several other productions with the fledgling company, including The Sunken Bell by Gerhart Hauptmann (1898), The Merchant of Venice by William Shakespeare (1898), Men Above the Law by Alexey Pisemsky (1898), The Death of Ivan the Terrible by A.K. Tolstoy (1899), Snegurochka by Alexander Ostrovsky (1900), and The Wild Duck by Henrik Ibsen (1901).

In 1902, he married Lika Mizinova, a woman with whom Anton Chekhov had once been romantically involved and who served as a prototype for Nina Zarechnaya in The Seagull. That same year, following a disagreement with Stanislavski over the re-organization of the company (which had also prompted the departure of Vsevolod Meyerhold), Sanin moved to the Alexandrinsky Theatre. He remained there until 1907, working as an actor, director, and acting teacher, during which time he sought to propagate Stanislavski's ideas within that company. He directed a number of plays by Alexander Ostrovsky with the Alexandrinsky, including The False Dmitry and Vasily Shuysky, An Ardent Heart and Stay in Your Own Sled.

In 1907, Sanin left the Alexandrinsky to join Sergey Dyagilev's European troupe. There, now working mainly as an opera director, he concentrated on the classics of Russian music and staged several successive opera productions, including Boris Godunov at the Grand Opera in Paris, with Fyodor Chalyapin in the lead. In 1913, Sanin joined the newly formed Mardzhanov's Free Theatre and in 1914–1915 he was the stage director of the Moscow Drama Theatre.

In January 1917, Sanin returned to Moscow Art Theatre and stayed until 1919. During this period he produced several plays and operas both for the Bolshoy (Pskovityanka by Rimsky-Korsakov, Prince Igor by Alexander Borodin, 1917; Georges Bizet's Carmen, 1922) and Maly Theatres (Posadnik by A.K. Tolstoy, Elektra by Hugo von Hofmannsthal, 1918, Ostrovsky's The Forest and Griboyedov's Woe from Wit, 1921). He was the director of three early Soviet films: Devyi Gory (1918), The Thieving Magpie (1920) Polikushka (1922).

Sanin and his wife left the Soviet Union in late 1922, after which he directed numerous classic Russian operas at several major world theatres, such as the Grand Opera, Metropolitan Opera, Theatre Royal, Drury Lane, and La Scala, staging works by Modest Musorgsky, Rimsky-Korsakov, Alexander Borodin, Alexander Dargomyzhsky, Mikhail Glinka, Pyotr Chaykovsky, Alexander Serov, and Anton Rubinstein.

He died in Italy on 8 May 1956 and was buried in the Protestant Cemetery, Rome.
