= Adolphe Goossens =

English horn player

Adolphe Anthony Goossens (29 April 1896 – 17 August 1916) was a horn player, a member of the famous Goossens musical family of Belgium origins but living in England from 1873. His father was the conductor and violinist Eugène Goossens. He was the third child of five, all musical: his siblings were Eugene (conductor and composer), Marie (harpist), Léon (oboist) and Sidonie (harpist).

Adolphe and Leon both gained early experience of orchestral playing in Merseyside orchestras, including the Akeroyd Orchestra and the Oxton Orchestral Society in Birkenhead, conducted at that time by James Matthews, deputy leader of the Liverpool Philharmonic Orchestra. With his siblings, Adolphe studied at the Royal College of Music in London. He was there from May 1912 until December 1913, and then began playing in professional orchestras. He spent a summer season at Torquay in a brass band conducted by Basil Cameron, and then joined the Scottish Orchestra in Glasgow under Emil Mlynarski. He was also starting to compose.

While in Glasgow he signed up to join the British Army (the Artists Rifles) on an impulse, and was quickly posted to France. Commissioned in the field as a second lieutenant, he was gazetted to the Norfolk Regiment and given command of a platoon. He was killed, aged 20, during the Battle of the Somme. His name is one of the 38 on the War Memorial at the Royal College of Music.
