= Polikúshka (novella) =

1863 novella by Leo Tolstoy

Polikúshka: The Lot of a Wicked Court Servant ("Поликушка") is a novella by Leo Tolstoy written in 1860 and first published in 1863. According to Tolstoy's translator Aylmer Maude, it is the story of a serf who loses money that belongs to his mistress before hanging himself.

== Influence ==
According to literary critic and translator Leo Wiener, the book (along with The Cossacks) "evoked a mass of very favourable criticism," even receiving compliments from Ivan Turgenev, who traditionally opposed Tolstoy's works. Oscar Wilde purchased a copy, along with The Pursuit of Happiness, and commented that Tolstoy can "crowd without overcrowding, the great canvas on which he works."

In 1922, it was made into a Soviet film: Polikushka.

== See also ==
- Bibliography of Leo Tolstoy
