= Eugène Goossens, fils =

French-born conductor and violinist

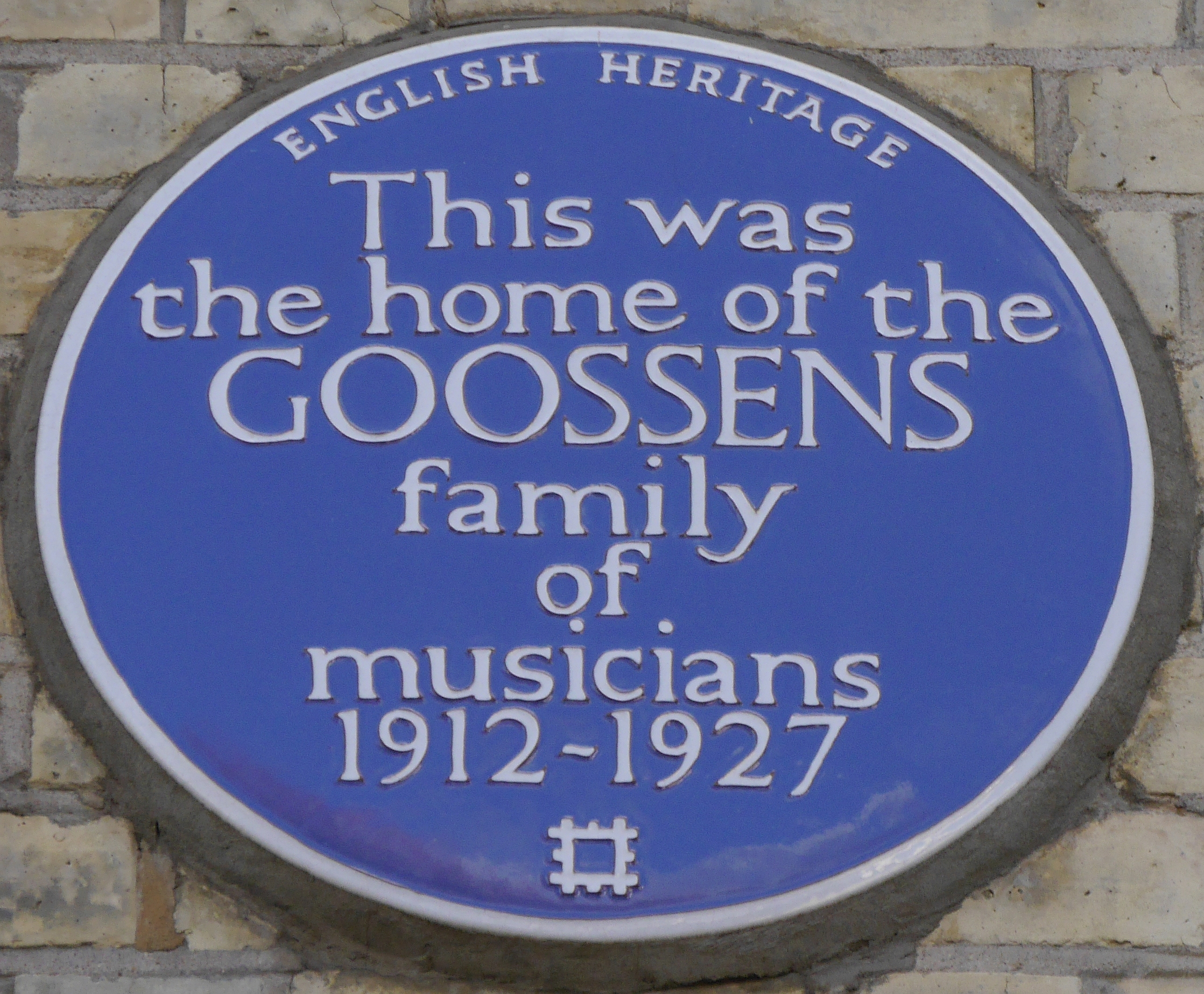
Blue plaque, 70 Edith Road West Kensington, London

Eugène Goossens (28 January 1867 – 31 July 1958) was a French-born conductor and violinist. To distinguish him from his conductor father and his composer son of the same name he is often referred to as Eugene Goossens II.

== Career ==
Goossens was born in Bordeaux and studied in Bruges and the conservatoire in Brussels. He moved to England with his father, Eugène Goossens, père, in 1873, and after a period of service with the Carl Rosa Opera Company as violinist, répétiteur and deputy conductor under the direction of his father he entered the Royal Academy of Music in London in 1891.

After conducting other opera companies including the Moody-Manners Company he rejoined the Carl Rosa company, serving from 1889 to 1915 as principal conductor. He conducted part of Sir Thomas Beecham's opera season at His Majesty's Theatre in 1917. In 1926 he joined the British National Opera Company as a conductor.

Goossens married a Carl Rosa singer, Annie Cook, who was the daughter of a well-known bass singer, T. Aynsley Cook. Their children were the composer and conductor Sir Eugene Goossens, the harpists Marie Goossens (1894–1991) and Sidonie Goossens (1899–2004), the horn player Adolphe Goossens (1896–1916) and the oboist Léon Goossens (1897–1988).
