= Léon Goossens =

English oboist

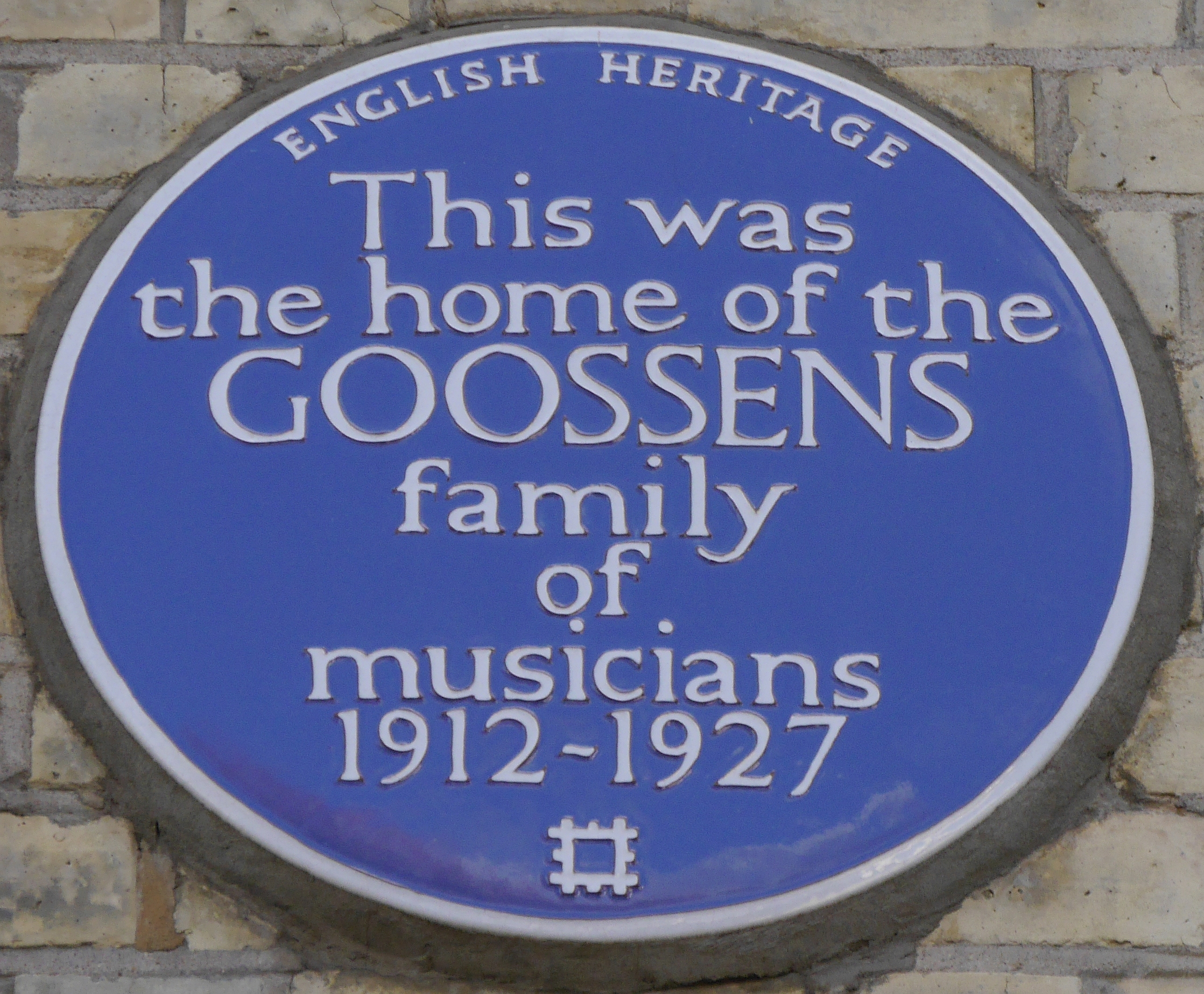
Blue plaque, 70 Edith Road West Kensington, London

Léon Jean Goossens, CBE, FRCM (12 June 1897 – 13 February 1988) was an English oboist.

== Career ==
Goossens was born in Liverpool, Lancashire, and studied at Liverpool College of Music and the Royal College of Music. His father was violinist and conductor Eugène Goossens, his brother the conductor and composer Eugene Aynsley Goossens and his sisters the harpists Marie and Sidonie Goossens. In 1916 his brother Adolphe, a gifted French horn player, was killed in action at the Somme.

During the early and middle parts of the 20th century, he was considered among the premier oboists in the world. He joined the Queen's Hall Orchestra (conducted by Henry Wood) at the age of 15 and was later (1932) engaged by Sir Thomas Beecham for the newly founded London Philharmonic Orchestra, but he also enjoyed a rich solo and chamber-music career. He became famous for a uniquely pleasing sound few other oboists could match. Oboists of the past had tended to be divided between the French school (elegant but thin and reedy in tone) and the German (full and rounded but rather clumsy, with little or no vibrato), but Goossens brought together the best qualities of both styles.

Goossens commissioned a number of works for the oboe from such distinguished composers as Sir Edward Elgar, Ralph Vaughan Williams and Rutland Boughton and collaborated extensively with other prominent soloists such as Yehudi Menuhin. Amongst his many pupils were the oboists Evelyn Barbirolli, Joy Boughton, daughter of Rutland Boughton and Peter Graeme, oboist of the Melos Ensemble. During WW2, when Londoners found shelter from German bombs in the Tube, in the underground, Goossens was a reliable entertainer. He played so often that even a casual concert in Cornwall in 1975 filled the church and people wept, remembering the comfort of his solo playing below ground and into the morning, before the all clear.

He was appointed a Commander of the Order of the British Empire (CBE) in 1950 and made a Fellow of the Royal College of Music in 1962. He married his second wife Lucie Leslie Burrowes in 1933 and there were three daughters: Benedicta, Jennie (an actress) and Corinne.

== Works commissioned/dedicated to Léon Goossens ==
- Concerto for Oboe and Strings, Op. 39, Malcolm Arnold
- Oboe Quartet, Op. 61 (1957), Malcolm Arnold
- Sonatina for Oboe and Piano, Op. 28, Malcolm Arnold
- Quintet for Oboe and Strings, Arnold Bax
- Quintet for Oboe and Strings, Arthur Bliss
- Concerto No. 2 for Oboe and Strings in G, Rutland Boughton
- Sonata for Oboe and Piano, York Bowen
- Phantasy Quartet for oboe, violin, viola and cello, Benjamin Britten
- Sonata for Oboe and Piano, Arnold Cooke
- Three Pieces for Oboe and Piano, Thomas Dunhill
- Soliloquy for oboe, Edward Elgar
- Idyll for oboe and orchestra (1926), Harry Farjeon
- Interlude, Op. 21, for oboe and string quartet, Gerald Finzi
- Concerto, Op. 45, by his brother Eugene Goossens
- Parfum de la Nuit, suite of three movements for oboe and orchestra (1922), Hyam Greenbaum
- Sonata for Oboe and Piano, Herbert Howells
- Quartet for Oboe and Strings, Gordon Jacob
- French Suite for Oboe and Piano, Alan Richardson
- Concerto in A minor for Oboe and Strings, Ralph Vaughan Williams
