= Ivan Moskvin (actor) =

Russian and Soviet actor and theater director

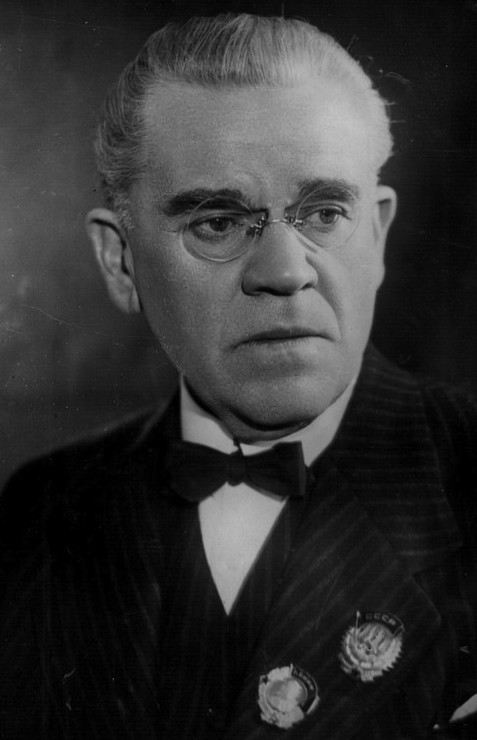
- Born: Ivan Mikhailovich Moskvin; June 18, 1874; Moscow, Russian Empire
- Died: February 16, 1946 (aged 71); Moscow, Russian SFSR, Soviet Union
- Occupation: Actor
- Spouse: Alla Tarasova (1936-?)

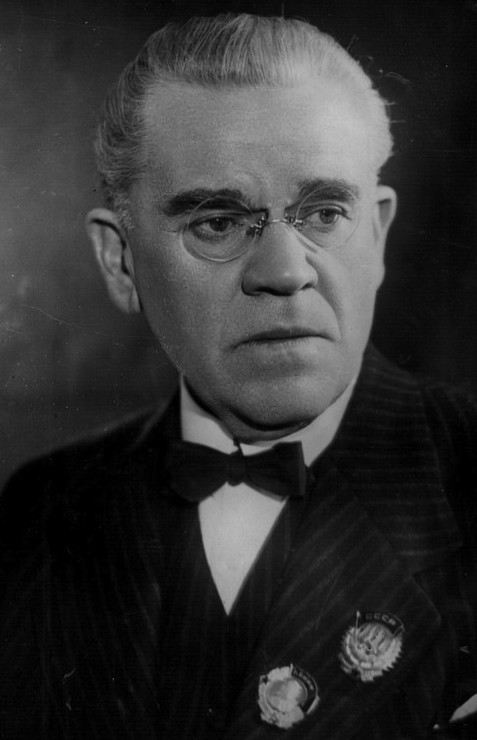
Ivan Moskvin

Ivan Mikhailovich Moskvin (Russian: Ива́н Миха́йлович Москви́н; 18 June 1874, in Moscow – 16 February 1946, in Moscow) was a Russian and Soviet actor and theater director. People's Artist of the USSR (1936).

He became director of the Moscow Art Theatre in 1943. He was a student in the Moscow Philharmonic Orchestra from 1893 to 1896. He also performed in the Yaroslavl company and the Korsh company in Moscow.

== Filmography ==
- Polikushka (1922)
- The Stationmaster (1925)
- An Hour with Chekhov (1929)
- Wish upon a Pike (1938)
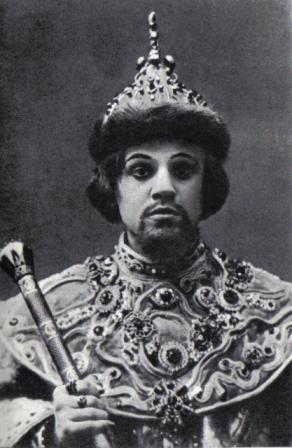
Moskvin as Tsar Fyodor in Tsar Fyodor Ioannovich by A. K. Tolstoy in 1898

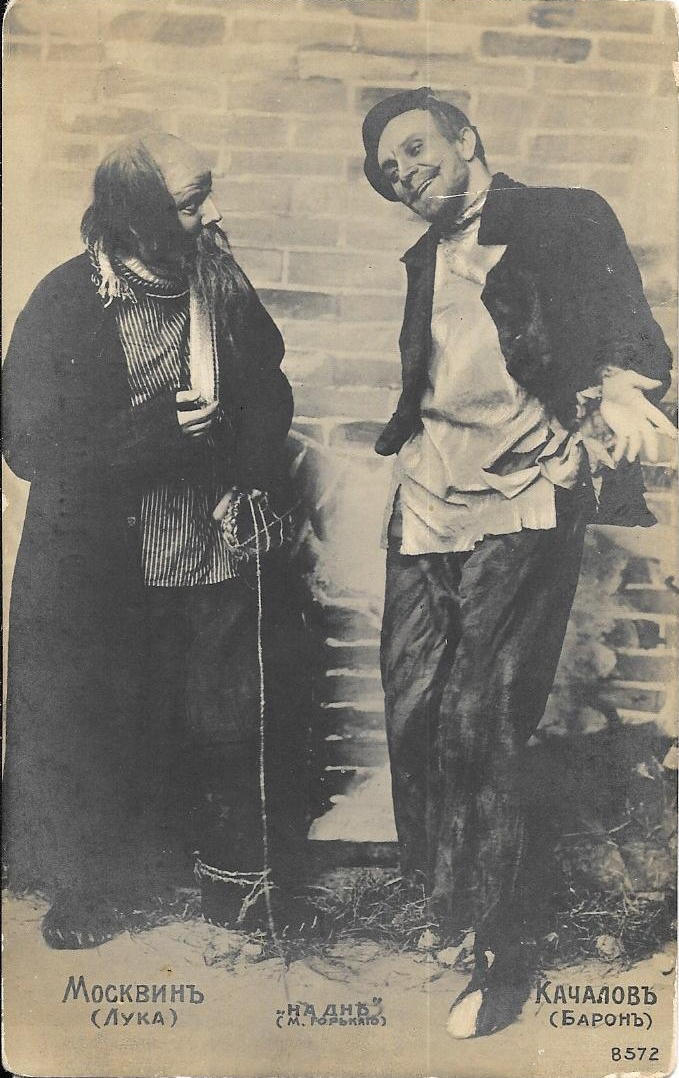
Moskvin (left) in The Lower Depths by Maxim Gorky in 1902

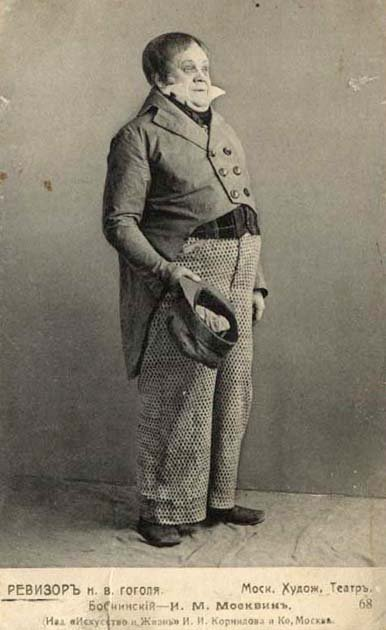
Moskvin as Bobchinsky in Revizor by Nikolai Gogol in 1906

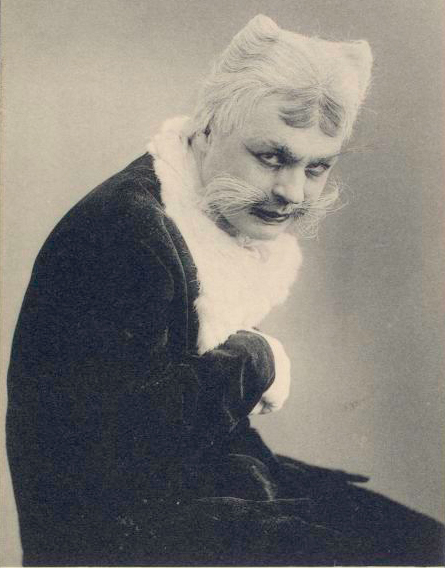
Moskvin as the Cat in The Blue Bird by Maurice Maeterlinck in 1908
