= Eugene Goossens (composer) =

English conductor and composer (1893–1962)

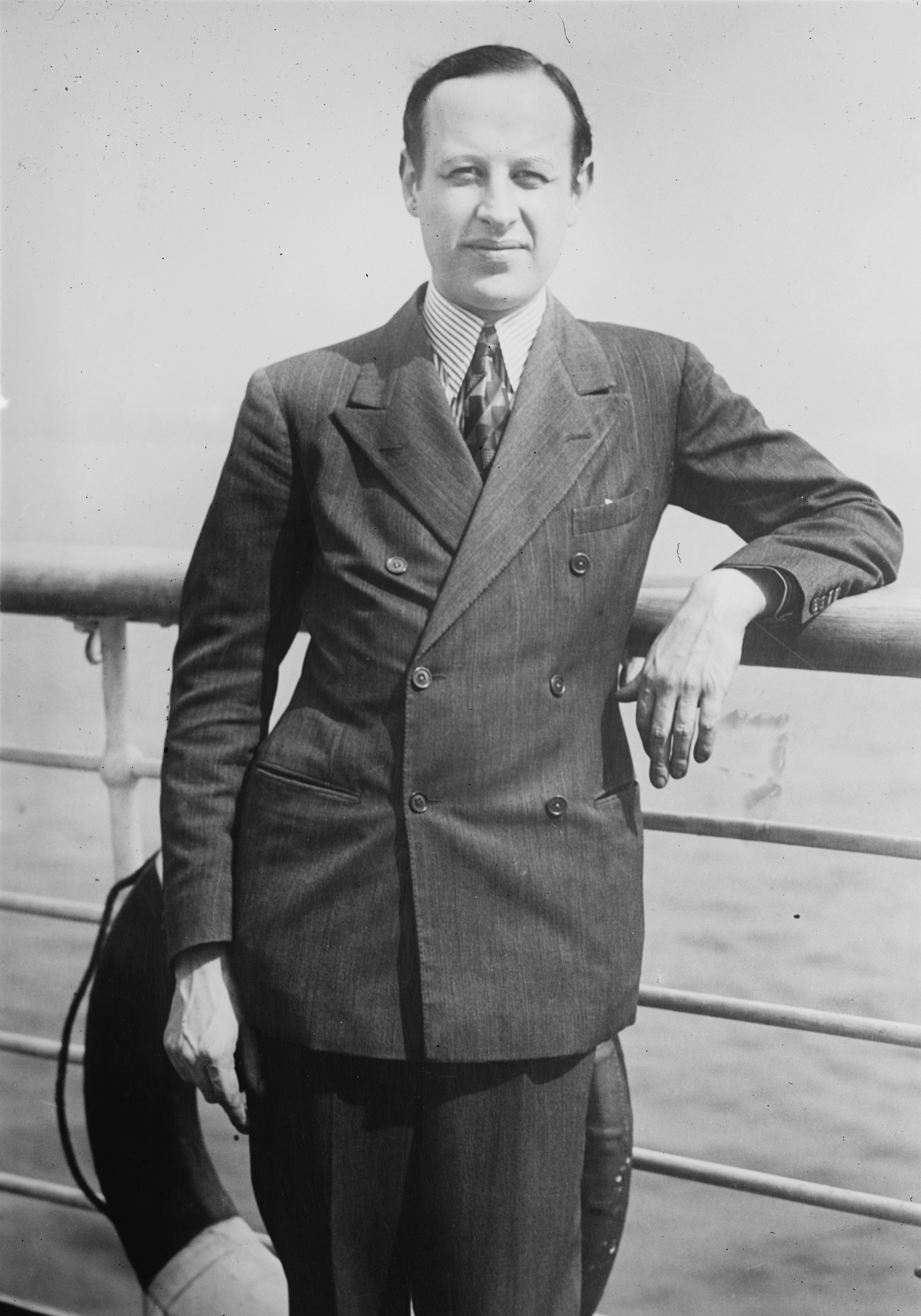
- Born: 26 May 1893; Camden Town, London, England
- Died: 13 June 1962 (aged 69); Middlesex
- Education: Liverpool College of Music
- Occupations: Conductor; Composer; Academic teacher
- Organizations: Rochester Philharmonic Orchestra; Sydney Symphony Orchestra; NSW State Conservatorium of Music

Sir Eugene Aynsley Goossens (/ˈɡuːsənz/; 26 May 1893 – 13 June 1962) was an English conductor and composer.

== Biography ==
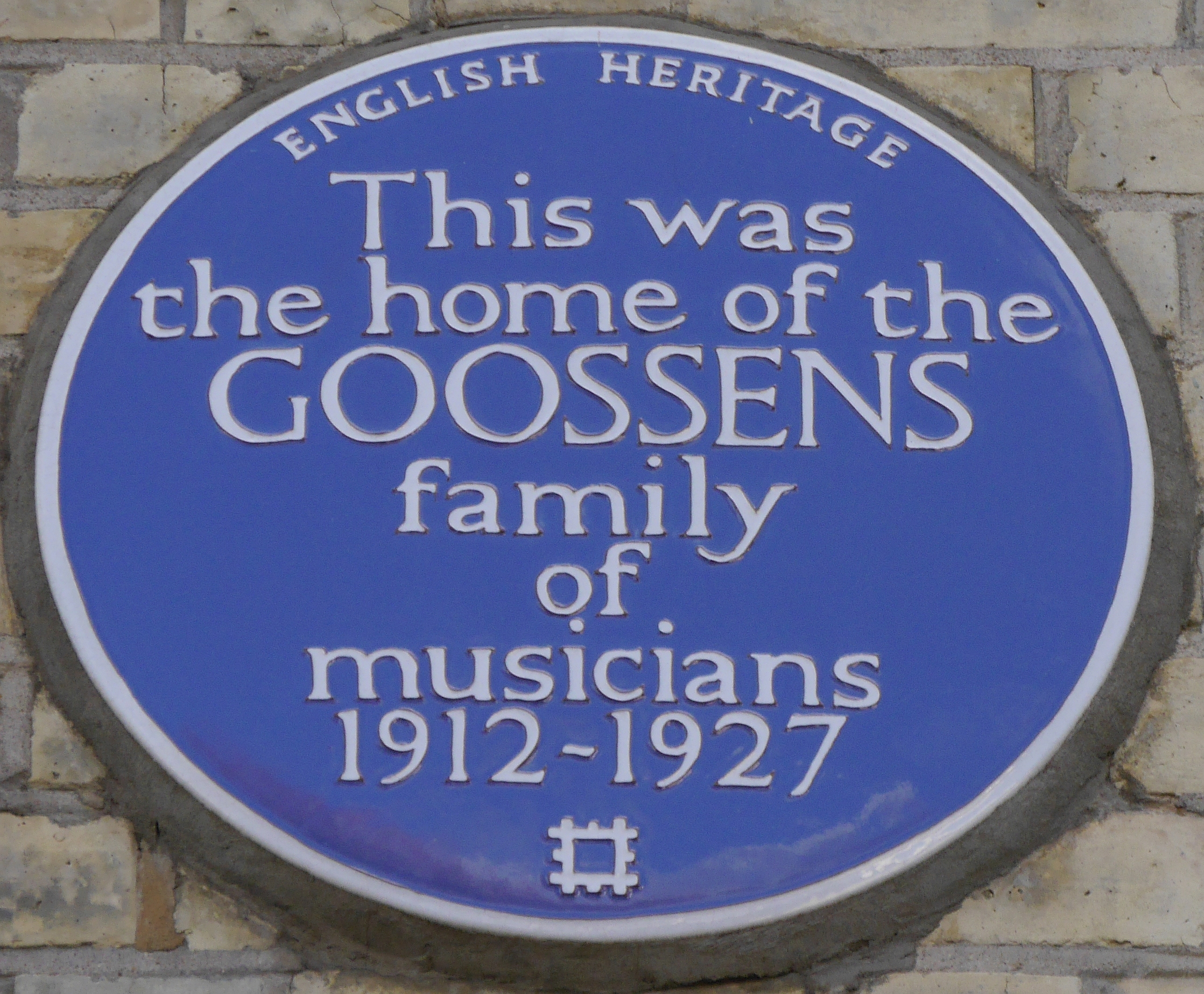
Blue plaque, 70 Edith Road, West Kensington, London

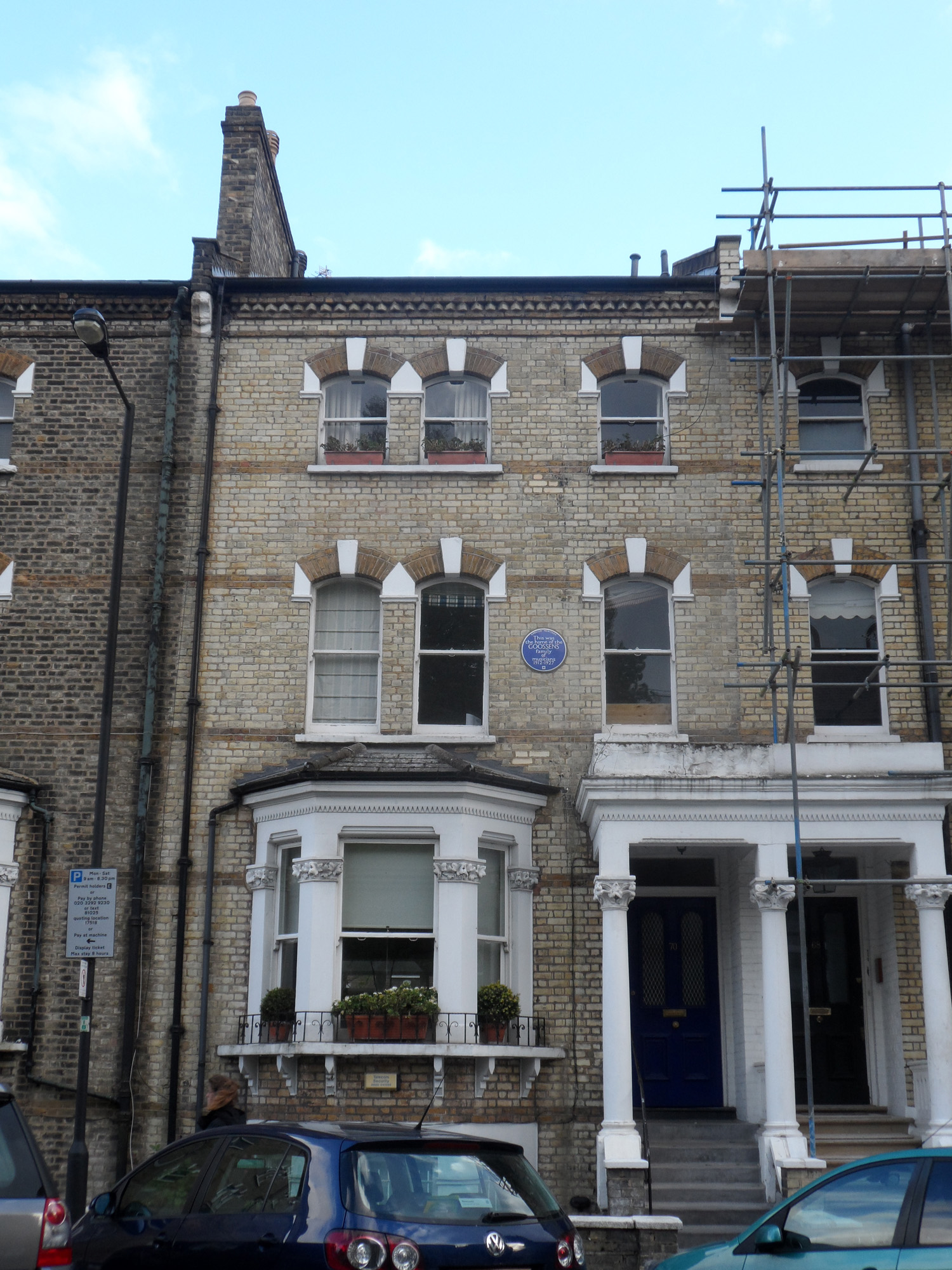
70 Edith Road, West Kensington, London

He was born in Camden Town, London, the son of the Belgian conductor and violinist Eugène Goossens (fils, 1867–1958) and Annie Cook, a Carl Rosa Opera Company singer. He was the grandson of the conductor Eugène Goossens (père, 1845–1906; his father and grandfather spelled Eugène with a grave accent; he himself did not). His younger sisters and brothers, all musicians, were Marie, Adolphe, Léon and Sidonie.

Eugene studied music at the age of ten in Bruges, three years later at Liverpool College of Music, and in 1907 in London on a scholarship at the Royal College of Music under composer Charles Villiers Stanford and the violinist Achille Rivarde among others. He won the silver medal of the Worshipful Company of Musicians and was made associate of the Royal College of Music.

He was a first violin in Henry Wood's Queen's Hall Orchestra from 1911 to 1915 and as second violinist a founding member of the Philharmonic Quartet before coming to attention as Thomas Beecham's assistant conductor with a performance of Stanford's opera The Critic (1916). In 1921 he decided to make conducting his career and founded his own orchestra; with this ensemble he made a number of gramophone records for Edison-Bell's Velvet Face label. He gave the British concert premiere of Stravinsky's The Rite of Spring on 7 June 1921 at the Queen's Hall with the composer present.

For nearly a quarter of a century, he accepted positions at U.S. orchestras. At the invitation of George Eastman he was conductor of the Rochester Philharmonic Orchestra from 1923 to 1931. This post also involved teaching at the Eastman School of Music. During the late 1920s he often conducted for Vladimir Rosing's American Opera Company, an organization which grew out of the Eastman School. From 1931 to 1946 he succeeded Fritz Reiner as the conductor of the Cincinnati Symphony Orchestra. In a tribute to Goossens on his departure for Australia, nine American composers collaborated on Variations on a Theme by Eugene Goossens, for orchestra. The composers were Ernest Bloch, Aaron Copland, Paul Creston, Anis Fuleihan, Roy Harris, Walter Piston, Bernard Rogers, Roger Sessions and Deems Taylor, with Goossens himself writing the finale.

Goossens spent nine years in Australia, from 1947 to 1956. There, he enthusiastically lobbied for a new major performing arts theatre, which ultimately led to the creation of the Sydney Opera House.

He conducted the Sydney Symphony Orchestra and other groups, and was the director of the NSW State Conservatorium of Music. He held these positions concurrently until March 1956, when he was forced to resign after a major public scandal, only a year after being knighted.

=== Scandal ===
In the early 1950s, Goossens met Rosaleen Norton, the so-called "Witch of Kings Cross". Norton was known as an artist of the grotesque and for her interest in the occult and erotica, which Goossens secretly shared. They conducted an intense affair, exchanging a number of passionate letters; although Goossens asked Norton to destroy all of them, she kept a bundle hidden behind a sofa.

In early 1956, Goossens visited Europe, unaware that Sydney police were already in possession of his letters to Norton and photographs of her occult activities, which had been stolen from her flat by Sydney Sun reporter Joe Morris, who had infiltrated her supposed "coven". When Goossens returned to Australia on 9 March 1956, he was detained at Sydney Airport, following a tip-off by informants in London; his bags were searched by Customs officials, who found a large amount of what was then considered pornographic material, which included photographs, prints, books, a spool of film, some rubber masks, and sticks of incense.

Although he was not immediately arrested or charged, Goossens naively agreed to attend a police interview a few days later, where he was confronted with photographs of Norton's "ceremonies" and his letters. Faced with the evidence of his affair with Norton – which left him open to the serious charge of "scandalous conduct" – Goossens was forced to plead guilty to the pornography charges. He paid a fine of £100; more significantly, the scandal ruined his reputation and forced him to resign from his positions. He returned to England in disgrace.

The scandal was the basis of a novel, Pagan (1990), by Inez Baranay; it also inspired a play, The Devil is a Woman, by Louis Nowra and an opera, Eugene & Roie, by Drew Crawford. The scandal is documented in the film The Fall of the House, directed by Geoff Burton.

== Marriages and children ==
He was married three times: to Dorothy Millar from 1919 to 1928 (with whom he had three daughters), to pianist Janet Lewis from 1930 to 1944 (two daughters, Sidonie born in 1932 and Renee born in 1940), and to Marjorie Foulkrod from 1946 to 1962 (childless).

His daughter Renee published an autobiography in 2003, which noted that her mother said her biological father was a Swedish violinist.

At the end of his life, he and his third wife lived apart, and he was instead joined by a young pianist from Adelaide, Pamela Main.

=== Note ===
The Belgian baritone Albert Goossens, who with his wife Alice Goossens-Viceroy, a soprano with the New South Wales State Orchestra, was on the teaching staff of the Sydney Conservatorium, was not related. Their daughter Renee Goossens, soprano and teacher at the Sydney Conservatorium and the Melba Conservatorium, has been confused with Renée Goossens (born 1940), youngest daughter of Sir Eugene Goossens and author of Belonging: a memoir.

== Death ==
His former student Richard Bonynge visited him near the end of his life, and found him "absolutely destroyed". Nevertheless, he was engaged for work with the BBC, and Everest Records asked Goossens to make some stereo recordings. For Everest he completed a powerful recording of Respighi's Feste Romane just before his death and it was released as the sole selection on the LP. His other Everest recordings included Rimsky-Korsakov's Scheherazade, Rachmaninoff's Symphonic Dances, Tchaikovsky's Manfred Symphony, and the Symphonie Fantastique by Hector Berlioz.

He died of rheumatic fever and a haemorrhaging gastric ulcer on 13 June 1962 at Hillingdon Hospital in Middlesex. He was buried in St Pancras and Islington Cemetery. He left his estate including copyrights and royalties "to my faithful companion and assistant Miss Pamela Main".

== Music and legacy ==
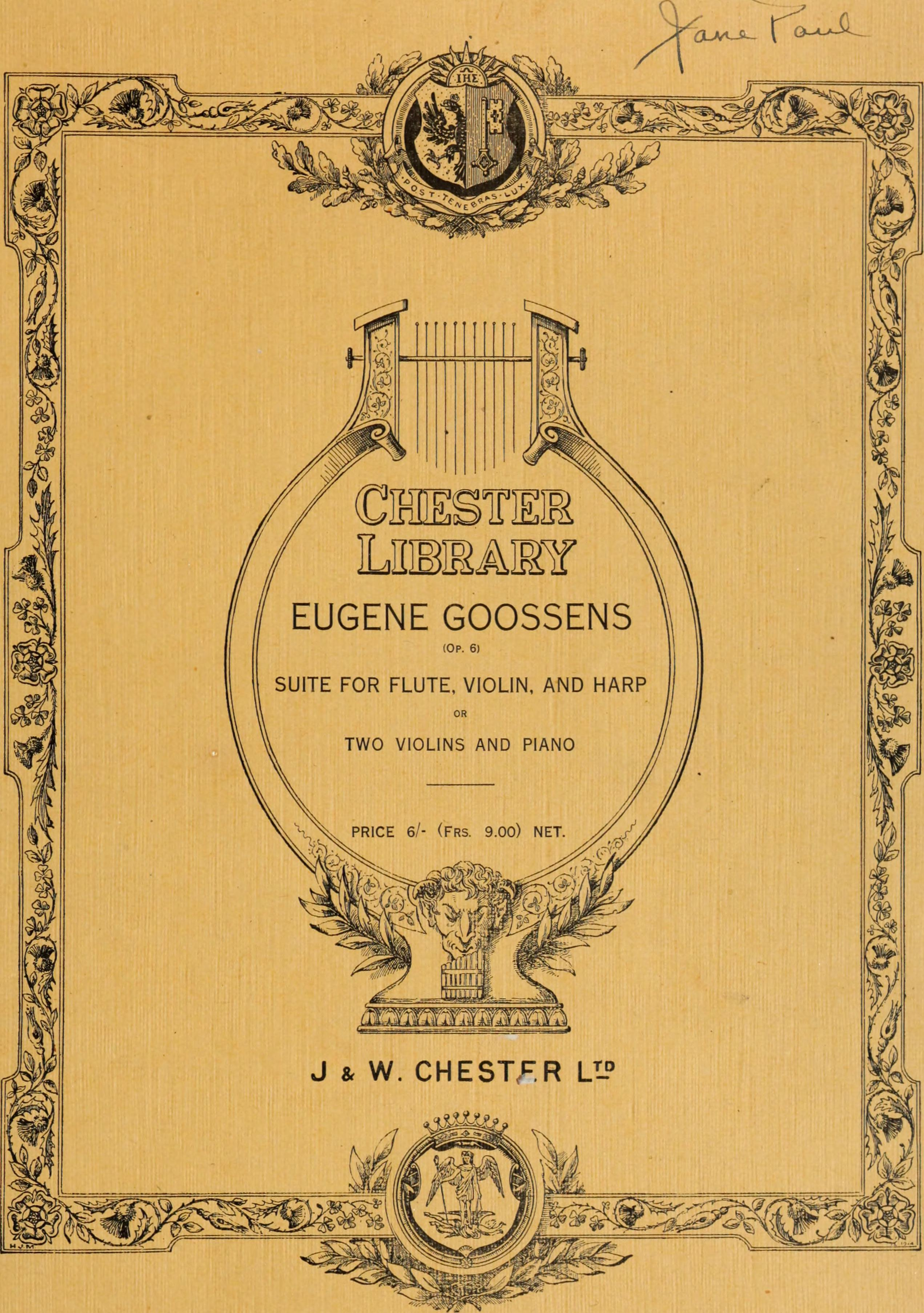
Cover of the Suite for flute, violin and harp, or two violins and piano

Among his works as a composer are two symphonies (1940, 1945), two "Phantasy" concertos (one for piano, one for violin) both composed in the 1940s, two string quartets (1918, 1942), two violin sonatas (1918 and 1930) and a Concertino for string octet (1928) that became quite popular and was later re-scored for string orchestra. The Oboe Concerto (1927), was written for his brother, Léon Goossens. He wrote two operas, both with libretto by Arnold Bennett, which Banfield believes are among his major achievements: Judith (1929) and Don Juan de Manara (1935). The latter was broadcast by the BBC on 11 April 1959 with Monica Sinclair, Marie Collier, Helen Watts, Marion Lowe, Bruce Boyce, Robert Thomas and Andrei McPherson. The performance was conducted by Goossens himself. And between 1949 and 1954 he wrote a large-scale oratorio, The Apocalypse, after the Revelation of St. John.

In 1942 Goossens wrote to several composers, including Aaron Copland, to request patriotic fanfares as "stirring and significant contributions to the war effort ..." Copland responded to the request with his famous Fanfare for the Common Man. Eighteen fanfares were written by the different composers and performed during the 1942/43 season of the Cincinnati Symphony Orchestra.

In 1941 he made the first American recording of the Symphony No. 2 by Tchaikovsky, with the Cincinnati Symphony Orchestra. Goossens's recording ignored the cuts that were popular with conductors at that time. That same year, also with the Cincinnati Symphony, he recorded Vaughan Williams' A London Symphony, in its 1920 edition, and also the original version of Walton's Violin Concerto, with Jascha Heifetz as soloist.

After his return to England, Goossens was approached by Beecham to arrange a modern symphony orchestra version of Handel's Messiah to mark the bicentenary of the composer's death in 1959. Goossens augmented the original orchestration with parts for four horns, three trombones, tuba, piccolo, contrabassoon, two harps, triangle, cymbals, and bass drum. Beecham recorded the piece soon afterward with the Royal Philharmonic Orchestra, and Goossens's version became synonymous with the conductor (but much less so with its orchestrator). Because of disputes around whose work the orchestration was, and the fact that the manuscript was held by the Beecham estate, despite it being claimed by Goossens's estate, it went unperformed for over 40 years. It went unrecorded for even longer, until a new recording appeared in 2020, again with the RPO, under Jonathan Griffith.

For Kapp Records, he recorded a bilingual version of Peter and the Wolf in 1959, featuring the actor José Ferrer narrating the story in both English and Spanish. The music was played by the Vienna State Opera Orchestra. The performance was later released on CD by MCA Records.

Goossens is credited for much of the lobbying to the New South Wales Government to build a music performance venue, a process that led to the construction of the Sydney Opera House. Having agreed to go ahead with the project, the New South Wales Premier Joseph Cahill had wanted it to be on or near Wynyard Railway Station in the north-west of the CBD, but Goossens insisted that it be built at Bennelong Point overlooking Sydney Harbour. The site of Bennelong Point was confirmed in 1957, after he had left Australia.

He is commemorated in the Eugene Goossens Hall, a small concert and recording facility that is part of the broadcasting complex of the Australian Broadcasting Corporation in Harris Street, Ultimo, in Sydney.

== Bibliography ==
- Goossens, Eugene (1972). Overture and Beginners: A Musical Autobiography. Westport, Connecticut: Greenwood Press. ISBN 0-8371-5597-5.
- Baranay, Inez (1990). Pagan. North Ryde, NSW: Angus & Robertson. ISBN 0-207-16681-1.
- Rosen, Carole (1994). The Goossens: A Musical Century. London: Andre Deutsch Ltd. ISBN 0-233-98833-5.
- Goossens, Eugene (1995). Cincinnati Interludes: A Conductor and His Audience. St. Austell: DGR Books. ISBN 1-898343-05-5.
- Hubble, Ava (1998). The Strange Case of Eugene Goossens and Other Tales from The Opera House. Sydney: Collins. ISBN 0-7322-2449-7.

== Discography ==
A far from complete listing:

- George Antheil: Symphony No 4 and Alberto Ginastera: Estancia ballet suite, London Symphony Orchestra, Everest stereo LP SDBR 3013 (1958)
- Antheil: Symphony No 4 (and Aaron Copland: Statements for Orchestra, Aaron Copland conducting, London Symphony Orchestra), Omega/Everest CD reissue of 1958 LP: EVC 9039 (1996)
- John Antill: Corroboree ballet suite, Sydney Symphony Orchestra, HMVED1193-4/2A A206-9 (1950), reissued on Dutton CD CDBP 9779 (2007)
- Antill: Corroboree ballet suite and Alberto Ginastera: Panambi ballet suite, London Symphony Orchestra, Sir Eugene Goosens, conductor, Everest stereo LP, SDBR 3003
- Antill: Corroboree ballet suite and Alberto Ginastera: Panambi ballet suite, Estancia ballet suite, Heitor Villa-Lobos: The Little Train of the Caipira, London Symphony Orchestra, Omega/Everest CD reissue of 1958–59 Everest LPs: EVC 9007 (1994)
- Arnold Bax: Tintagel, New Symphony Orchestra of London, HMV C1619-20, CR2017-19, (1928), reissued on Dutton CD CDBP 9779 (2007)
- Bax: Mediterranean, New Symphony Orchestra of London, HMV C1620 CR2025, (1928), reissued on Dutton CD CDBP 9779 (2007)
- Bax: Symphony No. 2, BBC Symphony Orchestra, live broadcast, 2 November 1956, Dutton CD CDBP 9779 (2007)
- Hector Berlioz: Symphonie fantastique, London Symphony Orchestra, Everest stereo LP (1959) SDBR 3037; reissued as Vanguard/Everest CD EVC 9017, (1995).
- Eugene Goossens: Four Conceits, Op.20 (~1917–1918), Goossens' s Orchestra, cond. Eugene Goossens. Edison Bell 'Velvet-Face' 1042 (10 in (25 cm) 78 rpm), masters 7325, 7326. Issued circa September 1922.
- Goossens: Tam O'Shanter, Op. 17a (1917), Royal Albert Hall Orchestra, HMV D694 Cc1777 (1922), reissued on Dutton CD CDBP 9779 (2007)
- Edvard Grieg: Peer Gynt Suite No. 1, London Philharmonic Orchestra, His Master's Voice/Electrola
- Paul Hindemith: Violin Concerto, Joseph Fuchs violin, London Symphony Orchestra, (with Hindemith: Symphony in E flat, Sir Adrian Boult conducting the London Philharmonic Orchestra), Omega/Everest CD reissue of Everest 1958–59 LPs: EVC 9009 (1994).
- Felix Mendelssohn: Symphony No. 3 Scottish, BBC Symphony Orchestra, His Master's Voice BLP 1045
- Mendelssohn: Symphonies Nos. 4 Italian and 5 Reformation, London Philharmonic Orchestra, Saga XID 5056
- Wolfgang Amadeus Mozart: Violin Concerto No. 3 and Paul Hindemith: Violin Concerto (world premiere recording), Joseph Fuchs, violin, London Symphony Orchestra, Everest stereo LP SDBR 3040 (1959)
- Modest Mussorgsky, orch. Maurice Ravel: Pictures at an Exhibition, Royal Philharmonic Orchestra, Pickwick SPC 4031
- Ottorino Respighi: Feste Romane and Sergei Rachmaninoff: Symphonic Dances, London Symphony Orchestra, Everest stereo LP SDBR 3004, (1958)
- Respighi: Feste Romane (with Respighi: Pini di Roma and Fontane di Roma conducted by Sir Malcolm Sargent), London Symphony Orchestra, Vanguard/Everest CD reissue EVC 9018 (1995)
- Nikolai Rimsky-Korsakov: Scheherazade, London Symphony Orchestra, World Record Club TP148
- Franz Schubert, Symphony in B minor (Unfinished), Royal Opera House Orchestra, His Master's Voice/Electrola (1925)
- Igor Stravinsky: Petrouchka, London Symphony Orchestra, Everest stereo LP SDBR 3033 (1959)
- Stravinsky: Symphony in Three Movements, London Symphony Orchestra, (and Stravinsky Ebony Concerto with Woody Herman orchestra) Everest stereo LP SDBR 3009 (1958)
- Stravinsky: Le Sacre du Printemps, London Symphony Orchestra, Everest stereo LP SDBR 3047 (1960)
- Stravinsky: Petrouchka, Symphony in Three Movements, London Symphony Orchestra, Vanguard/Everest CD reissue of Everest 1958 LPs: EVC 9042, (1996).
- Stravinsky: Petrouchka, Symphony in Three Movements, London Symphony Orchestra (and Stravinsky: Ebony Concerto with Woody Herman orchestra), Philips CD reissue of Everest 1958 LPs: Philips 422 303–2, (1989).
- Stravinsky: Le Sacre du Printemps and Sergei Rachmaninoff: Symphonic Dances, London Symphony Orchestra, Vanguard/Everest CD reissue of 1960 & 1958 LPs: EVC 9002 (1994).
- Stravinsky: Le Sacre du Printemps and Petrouchka, London Symphony Orchestra. Bescol/Compact Classics CD reissue of Everest 1959–1960 LPs: CD 514 (1987).
- Tchaikovsky: Manfred Symphony, London Symphony Orchestra, Everest stereo LP SDBR 3035 (1959); reissued as Omega/Everest CD EVC 9025 (with Jean Sibelius: tone poem Tapiola, Tauno Hannikainen conducting the London Symphony Orchestra) (1996).
- Tchaikovsky: 1812 Overture, Eugene Onegin Waltz, Royal Opera House Orchestra, His Master's Voice/Electrola
- Heitor Villa-Lobos: Little Train of the Caipira, Manuel de Falla: The Three-Cornered Hat World Record Club STP 164.
