= Polikushka (film) =

1922 film by Aleksandr Sanin

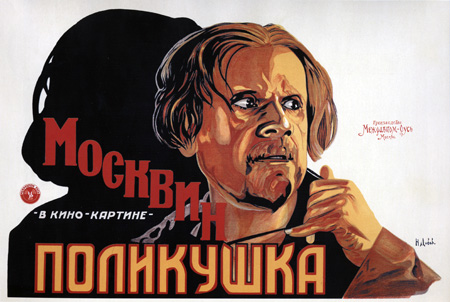
- Film poster
- Directed by: Alexander Sanin
- Written by: Fedor Ozep; Nikolai Efros; Leo Tolstoy (story)
- Starring: Ivan Moskvin; Vera Pashennaya
- Cinematography: Yuri Zhelyabuzhsky
- Production company: Russ
- Release date: 31 October 1922
- Running time: 50 minutes
- Country: Soviet Union
- Language: Silent film

Polikushka (Russian: Поликушка) is a 1922 Soviet drama film directed by Alexander Sanin, based on Leo Tolstoy's 1863 story of the same title: Polikúshka: The Lot of a Wicked Court Servant. It features the famous Moscow Art Theatre actor Ivan Moskvin in his first on-screen role. The filming was completed in 1919 but the release was delayed till 1922 because of the Russian Civil War.

== Plot ==
Peasant Polikushka is as Tolstoy described him, "an insignificant man and a little flyblown", he is good-natured but weak-willed. He spends most of his time in a tavern, but cannot find a meeting among minds even among the other regulars. He commits petty theft to buy vodka.

Once he is summoned to a manor house and is charged to go to the city to bring money. Polikushka receives an opportunity for the first time to "demonstrate himself" and intends to make the most out of this opportunity. He feels that this could be the beginning of a new life for him.

Arriving in the city Polikushka receives an envelope with the money which becomes a source of constant worry for him – he is terribly afraid that something happens to the envelope. In the end he hides it in his hat and goes back to the village. As he is lulled to sleep by the wagon's rocking the cap slides from his head with the envelope falling to the wayside. Polikushka dreams that he gloriously enters the mistress's house, gives over the envelope, receives thanks and the reward, and becomes elevated in his own eyes.

Waking up Polikushka detects the loss of the envelope and is gravely dejected. He ambles down the road in search of his loss but to no avail. Polikushka falls into deep despair. Returning home, he takes the rope from the child's cot and hiding from his wife goes up to the attic and hangs himself.

== Cast ==
- Ivan Moskvin - Polikushka
- Vera Pashennaya - Akulina, Polikushka's wife
- Yevgeniya Rayevskaya - The Lady
- Varvara Bulgakova - The Lady's niece
- Sergey Aydarov - Steward
- Dmitry Gundurov - The gardener
- Sergey Golovin - Dutlov
- A. Istomin - Ilyukha
- Nikolai Znamenskiy - Alyokha
- Varvara Massalitinova - The joiner's wife
- Nikolai Kostromskoy - Barman

== Production ==
The film was Ivan Moskvin's film debut and he had to readjust his overly theatrical acting style to a more realistic and reserved manner.

Filming was done in a difficult period when there was a severe shortage of film stock. Reshoots were done only in exceptional circumstances.

== Reception ==
Moskvin's naturalist acting was praised by many critics.
