= Rupert Marshall-Luck =

British violinist and musicologist

Rupert Marshall-Luck (born Rupert Luck) is a British violinist and musicologist.

After reading Music at Cambridge University, he was awarded a postgraduate scholarship to continue his studies with the eminent pedagogue Simon Fischer and thereafter won a Distinction for his degree of Master of Music. He now appears as soloist and recitalist at major festivals and venues throughout the UK as well as in France, Germany, the Netherlands, the Republic of Ireland, Switzerland and the USA. He is married to Em Marshall-Luck, the organiser of the English Music Festival.

== Recordings ==
Marshall-Luck has made several recordings with the pianist Matthew Rickard of works by British composers for the label EM Records, his discs including World Première recordings of compositions written during the late nineteenth and early twentieth centuries and which, in many cases, he has himself edited for performance (see also Musicology). These recordings have attracted much critical acclaim: his CDs of Violin Sonatas by Bliss, Walford Davies and York Bowen (EMR CD001) and of works for violin and piano by Elgar, Gurney and Sainsbury (EMR CD006) were both named as ‘Recordings of the Month’ by MusicWeb International; EMR CD001 was also commended by BBC Music Magazine: “Besides bombproof tuning and serious reserves of firepower, [Marshall-Luck’s] musicianship offers full-throated, gloss-free fullness of tone which would impress in any context”. His recording of Vaughan Williams’s Violin Sonata, Holst’s Five Pieces and Walford Davies’s Violin Sonata in E-flat was hailed by The Strad for its “deeply committed and discriminating performances... Marshall-Luck’s ability to spin cantabile lines with the subtlest of inflections pays dividends.”; whilst ‘Fanfare’ stated: “Marshall-Luck’s technique and intonation are flawless... each work is projected with knowing sensitivity and communicative expression.”

He has also recorded a conspectus of the chamber music of John Pickard for Toccata Classics (TOCC 0150), which has also been well-received, International Record Review stating that “Rupert Marshall-Luck... proves as adept in an overtly contemporary idiom as in those of the early twentieth century with which he is most associated”; and Fanfare highlighting it as “a compact disc not to be missed”.

== Musicology ==
Over the past few years, Marshall-Luck has been active as an editor and writer and has been responsible for editing from the composers' autographs several works that he has included in his recital programmes and recordings; some of these, such as the Violin Sonata in A major by Henry Walford Davies, the Five Pieces for Violin and Piano by Gustav Holst, and the Sonata for Violin and Piano in E-flat major by Ivor Gurney, have been published by EM Publishing. He has also worked with G. Henle Verlag of Munich on a new scholarly-critical edition of Elgar's popular salon piece Salut d'Amour; his article exploring the notation of the work's sources and its implication upon the performance of the piece was circulated by the publishing house on its website in 2013.

== Discography ==
Bliss, Walford Davies and York Bowen: Violin Sonatas (EM Records: EMR CD001; EAN 5 060263 500001)
Bantock and Holbrooke: Viola and Violin Sonatas (EM Records: EMR CD003; EAN 5 060263 500025)
Holst, Walford Davies and Vaughan Williams: Works for Violin and Piano (EM Records: EMR CD006; EAN 5 060263 500056)
John Pickard: Chamber Music (Toccata Classics: TOCC 0150; EAN 5 060113 441508)
Gurney, Sainsbury and Elgar: Works for Violin and Piano (EM Records: EMR CD011; EAN 5 060263 500100)

== Publications as editor ==
Gustav Holst: Five Pieces for Violin and Piano (EMP SP001; ISMN 979-0-708119-00-5)
Henry Walford Davies: Sonata in A major for Violin and Piano (EMP SP002; ISMN 979-0-708119-01-2)
Granville Bantock: Sonata no.3 in C major for Violin and Piano (EMP SP003; ISMN 979-0-708119-02-9)
Ivor Gurney: Sonata in E-flat major for Violin and Piano (EMP SP004; ISMN 979-0-708119-03-6 & EMP SP004-2V; ISMN 979-0-708119-04-3)
