= Helen Glatz =

English composer and pianist

Helen Sinclair Glatz (née Hunter) (13 March 1908–15 June 1996) was an English composer and pianist, a pupil of Ralph Vaughan Williams, best known for her teaching at Dartington Hall and the Dartington International Summer School for over 40 years.

== Life ==
Helen Sinclair Hunter was born in the South Shields, Durham, England. She studied music under Dr. William Gillies Whittaker at Armstrong College, Newcastle-upon-Tyne. She was the first woman from northern England to win an open scholarship for composition to the Royal College of Music, where she studied under Vaughan Williams and Gordon Jacob. Her contemporaries there included Elizabeth Lutyens, Elizabeth Maconchy and Imogen Holst. She was a Cobbett Prize winner for her Phantasy Trio for strings in 1931.

During a composition scholarship in 1933, Hunter travelled to Vienna, Italy, and Budapest, where she studied under Zoltán Kodály and Sándor Vegh. She married linguist Wolf Glatz in Hungary and remained there during World War II until he could secure passage out of the country, fleeing as the Red Army took Budapest. The couple settled in South Devon in 1949, where Helen Glatz took a teaching position at St. Timothy's School in Dawlish.

Following the death of her husband in 1952 she joined the staff at Dartington Hall in Totnes, where she taught piano, percussion, accompanied choirs, conducted, and worked closely with Imogen Holst and Sir William Glock. She played as a ballet rehearsal pianist for Marie Rambert, and also took the time to further her percussion studies with James Blades, who gave her his prized side drum. Her pupils included bassoon and oboe player Lindsay Cooper, symphonic composer Philip Sawyers, Benjamin Britten's music assistant (after Imogen Holst) Rosamund Strode (1927-2010), and organist John Wellingham.

Glatz stayed at Dartington for the rest of her life, living in a cottage on the estate and receiving an honorary fellowship in 1995. She had one son, Christopher. She died in Totnes, Devon in 1996.

== Works ==
Helen Glatz composed chamber, brass ensemble and percussion music, solo pieces and theatre music. Her Elegy for violin and strings, originally written for Dartington Hall founder Leonard Elmhirst, was performed on tour by the Goldberg Ensemble in 1990 and also played at Dartington in 1994 to celebrate his centenary. Other works include three children's ballets (1954, 1956, 1958), a choral cantata and two psalm settings (1931, 1976).

Glatz would write Christmas music for Dartington every year. Her Five Carols Without Words for wind quintet gained some popularity after the 1958 Festival and became her best known work, and one of the few to be published.

The music of hers that is most often heard today is her 1930 arrangement for strings of Vaughan Williams' Hymn-tune Prelude on Song 13 by Orlando Gibbons, originally written for the pianist Harriet Cohen. The arrangement was recorded by Richard Hickox and the London Symphony Orchestra in 1999. The only other work of hers to be recorded is her 1967 Fanfare.

The publisher Phylloscopus has more recently published some of her pieces, including the Five Carols Without Words, the Suite for bassoon and piano, and the Hungarian Folk Song Suite for two bassoons.

Works that can be reliably dated include:

- Viola Sonata (1929)
- Phantasy Trio for strings (1931)
- Scherzo and Trio for orchestra (1932)
- Septet (1932)
- String Quartet No 1 (1932)
- String Trio (1933)
- Phantasy String Quartet (1934)
- Essex Suite for brass band (1935)
- String Quartet No 2 (1936)
- Ballet Electric (1937)
- Concertino for flute and string orchestra (1948)
- Theme and Variations for orchestra (1949)
- Ballet Suite (1952)
- Suite of children's pieces for piano (1952)
- Two carols for women's choir, flute, and viola (1956)
- Five Carols Without Words for flute, oboe, clarinet and horn (1958)
- Prelude and Scherzo for flute (1958)
- Three Winter Songs (de la Mare) (1958)
- Two Latin Poems for women's choir and two flutes (1962)
- Two Latin Poems for women's choir and two flutes (1962)
- Three Songs on Cats for soprano and clarinet (1962)
- Suite for piano duet, based on Hungarian folk songs (1963)
- Concertino for trombone, strings and timpani (1965)
- Dance Rhapsody for harp and orchestra (1967)
- Elegy for string orchestra (1967)
- Flute Sonata (1971)
- Hall Sands for narrator, taped voice, spoken and sung choir, percussion and wind instruments (1971)
- Violin Sonata (1972)
