= Tantivy =

Tantivy may mean:

- HMS Tantivy (P319), a British submarine
- Tantivy Towers, a three-act light opera, written by A. P. Herbert and with music by Thomas Frederick Dunhill
- Tantivy Search, an information retrieval library
