= List of compositions by Frank Bridge =

Below is a sortable list of compositions by Frank Bridge. The works are categorized by genre, Hindmarsh catalogue number (H.), date of composition and title. Revised references published in Frank Bridge: The Complete Works, 2016 are given in brackets [see below].

Genre	H.	Date	Title	Scoring	Notes
Chamber music	1	1900	Piano Trio No.1 in D minor	for violin, cello and piano	
Chamber music	2	1900	Romance: Une Lamentatione d'amour	for violin and piano	
Chamber music	3	1900	String Quartet in B♭ major	for 2 violins, viola and cello	
Chamber music	4	1900	3 Dances: 1. Adagio ben sostenuto e con tristezza (D minor); 2. Allegretto (D major); 3. Moto perpetuo (D minor)	for violin or cello and piano	revised 1911
Vocal	5	1901	Sonnet: When Most I Wink	for voice and piano	words: Sonnet 43 by William Shakespeare
Chamber music	6	1901	Scherzo Phantastick	for 2 violins, viola and cello	
Chamber music	7	1901	String Quintet in E minor	for 2 violins, 2 violas and cello	
Chamber music	8	1901	Berceuse in B♭ major	for violin or cello and piano	
Concertante	8	1901	Berceuse in B♭ major	for violin and string orchestra	original for violin or cello and piano
Orchestral	8	1901	Berceuse in B♭ major	for small orchestra	original version for violin or cello and piano
Piano	8	1901	Berceuse in B♭ major	for piano	original version for violin or cello and piano; published in 1929
Vocal	9	1901	Berceuse	for soprano and orchestra	words by Dorothy Wordsworth
Orchestral	10	1901	Coronation March	for orchestra	written for a competition celebrating the new King Edward VII
Organ	11	c.1901	Adagio ma non troppo in G minor	for organ	
Vocal	12	c.1901	If I Could Choose	for voice and piano	words by Thomas Ashe
Vocal	13	c.1901	The Primrose	for voice and piano	words by James Merrick
Vocal	14	1902	The Hag	for baritone and orchestra	words by James Merrick
Chamber music	15	1902	Piano Quartet in C minor	for violin, viola, cello and piano	
Piano	16	1902	Pensées Fugitives I in F minor	for piano	Only the first of the intended Pensées Fugitives was actually completed; published by Thames Publishing
Orchestral	17	1902	Valse Intermezzo à Cordes in E minor	for string orchestra	
Orchestral	18	1901–1902	Trois Morceaux d'orchestre (3 Pieces for Orchestra): 1. Chant de tristesse 2. Chant d'espérance 3. Chant de gaieté	for small orchestra	
Chamber music	19	c.1902	Scherzetto	for cello and piano (or orchestra)	
Chamber music	19a	c.1902	Scherzo	for cello and piano	revised version of H.19
Piano	20	1902	Scherzettino in G minor	for piano	published by Thames Publishing
Vocal	21	1903	A Dirge	for medium voice and piano	words by Percy Bysshe Shelley
Chamber music	22	1903	Con Moto	for violin and piano	
Chamber music	23	1903	Serenade	for violin or cello and piano	
Orchestral	23	1903	Serenade	for orchestra	original version for violin or cello and piano
Piano	23	1903	Serenade	for piano	original version for violin or cello and piano
Orchestral	[24]	1903	Dramatic Overture	for orchestra	
Choral	[25]	1903	Autumn	for mixed chorus a cappella	words by Percy Bysshe Shelley
Vocal	[26]	1903	The Devon Maid	for medium voice and piano	words by John Keats
Vocal	[27]	1903	Rising When the Dawn Still Faint Is	for voice and piano	words by Heinrich Heine
Vocal	[27a]	1903	Dawn and Evening	for voice and piano or orchestra	words by Heinrich Heine
Vocal	[28]	1903	2 Songs after Heine: 1. Where E'er My Bitter Teardrops Fall; 2. E'en as a Lovely Flower	for tenor and piano	2. also for tenor and small orchestra
Vocal	28c	c.1903	The Mountain Voice	for voice and piano	words by Heinrich Heine; incomplete
Piano	29	1903	Moderato in E minor	for piano	published by Thames Publishing
Orchestral	30	1903	Mid of the Night, Symphonic Poem	for orchestra	
Vocal	31	1903	Music When Soft Voices Die	for high voice and piano	words by Percy Bysshe Shelley
Chamber music	32	1903	Tempo di Mazurka	for cello and piano	
Vocal	33	1903	Blow, Blow Thou Winter Wind	for medium voice and piano	words by William Shakespeare
Vocal	34	1903	Go Not, Happy Day	for voice and piano	words by Alfred, Lord Tennyson
Vocal	[35]	c.1903	Remembrance	for voice and piano	words by Percy Bysshe Shelley
Vocal	36	1904	Night Lies on the Silent Highways	for medium voice and piano	words by Heinrich Heine
Choral	37	1904	Music When Soft Voices Die	for mixed chorus a cappella	words by Percy Bysshe Shelley
Vocal	38	1904	A Dead Violet	for medium voice and piano	words by Percy Bysshe Shelley
Chamber music	39	1904	Sonata in E♭ major	for violin and piano	
Vocal	40	1904	2 Songs: 1. Fall Now Cold My Thoughts; 2. Fly Home My Thoughts	for voice and orchestra	
Vocal	41	c.1904	Harebell and Pansy	for voice and orchestra	incomplete
Vocal	42	1904	Song Cycle: 1. Love; 2. Life; 3. Death	for voice and piano	3. incomplete
Chamber music	43	1904	3 Pieces	for 2 violins, viola and cello	
Chamber music	44	1904	3 Novelletten	for 2 violins, viola and cello	
Chamber music	45	1904	Romanze	for violin and piano	
Vocal	46	c.1904	Cradle Song	for voice and piano	words by Alfred, Lord Tennyson
Chamber music	47	1904	Élégie	for cello and piano	
Chamber music	48	1904	Souvenir	for violin and piano	
Chamber music	49	1904–1905	Piano Quintet in D minor	for 2 violins, viola, cello and piano	original version in 4 movements
Chamber music	49a	1904–1905; 1912	Piano Quintet in D minor	for 2 violins, viola, cello and piano	revised version in 3 movements
Vocal	50	1905	Lean Close Thy Cheek against My Cheek	for voice and piano	words by Heinrich Heine
Vocal	51	1905	Fair Daffodils	for voice and piano	words by James Merrick
Piano	52	1905	Capriccio No. 1 in A minor	for piano	published by Augener
Chamber music	53	1905	2 Pieces: 1. Pensiero (F minor); 2. Allegretto (A major)	for viola and piano	2. incomplete; The coda was completed by Paul Hindmarsh in 1980.
Piano	54	1905	2 Solos for Piano: 1. A Sea Idyll (E major); 2. Capriccio No. 2 (F♯ minor)	for piano	published by Houghton and Co.
Chamber music	55	1905	Phantasie String Quartet in F minor	for 2 violins, viola and cello	won second prize in the 1905 Cobbett Chamber Music Competition
Organ	56	1905	First Book of Organ Pieces: 1. Allegretto grazioso (A major); 2. Allegro comodo (B♭ major); 3. Allegro marziale e ben marcato (D major)	for organ	published by Winthrop Rogers
Vocal	57	1905	Adoration	for medium voice and piano or orchestra	words by John Keats
Piano	58	1905	Étude Rhapsodique in A minor	for piano	published by Thames Publishing
Chamber music	59	1905	Amaryllis in D major	for violin and piano	
Chamber music	60	1905	Norse Legend in G minor	for violin and piano	
Piano	60	1905	Norse Legend in G minor	for piano	original version for violin and piano
Orchestral	60	1905, 1938	Norse Legend in G minor	for small orchestra	original version for violin and piano
Vocal	61	1905	So Perverse	for medium voice and piano	words by Robert Bridges
Vocal	62	1905	Tears, Idle Tears	for medium voice and piano	words by Alfred, Lord Tennyson
Organ	63	1905	3 Pieces for Organ: 1. Andante moderato (C minor); 2. Adagio (E major); 3. Allegro con spirito (B♭ major)	for organ	published by Novello
Chamber music	64	c.1905	3 Pieces for String Quartet	for 2 violins, viola and cello	
Vocal	65	1905–1906	2 Songs of Robert Bridges: 1. I Praise the Tender Flower; 2. Thou Didst Delight My Eyes	for high baritone and orchestra	words by Robert Bridges
Piano	66	1906	Dramatic Fantasia	for piano	published by Thames Publishing
Chamber music	67	1906	3 Idylls	for 2 violins, viola and cello	movement 2 used as the theme of Variations on a Theme of Frank Bridge by Benjamin Britten
Piano	68	1906	3 Sketches: 1. April; 2. Rosemary; 3. Valse Capricieuse	for piano	published by Winthrop Rogers
Orchestral	68b	1906, 1936	Rosemary	for orchestra	orchestration of No. 2 of 3 Sketches for piano, H.68
Vocal	69	1906	The Violets Blue	for voice and piano or string quartet	words by Heinrich Heine
Chamber music	70	1906	String Quartet No. 1 in E minor	for 2 violins, viola and cello	
Vocal	71	1906	Come to Me in My Dreams	for voice and piano	words by Matthew Arnold
Vocal	72	1906	My Pent Up Tears Oppress My Brain	for voice and piano	
Vocal	[73]	c.1906	2 Recitations: 1. The Lovers' Quarrell; 2. The Maniac	for speaker and piano	1. words by Robert Browning; 2. words by Matthew Gregory Lewis
Chamber music	74	1906	The Rag	for 2 violins, viola and cello	
Chamber music	75	c.1904–1906	Valse Fernholt	for violin, viola, cello and piano	
Vocal	76	1906–1907	3 Songs: 1. Far, Far from Each Other; 2. Where Is It That Our Soul Doth Go?; 3. Music When Soft Voices Die	for medium voice, viola obbligato and piano	1. words by Matthew Arnold; 2. words by Heinrich Heine; 3. words by Percy Bysshe Shelley
Vocal	77	1907	All Things That We Clasp	for voice and piano	words by Heinrich Heine
Orchestral	78	1907	Isabella, Symphonic Poem	for orchestra	after John Keats
Chamber music	79	1907	Phantasie Piano Trio in C minor	for violin, cello and piano	won first prize in the 1908 Cobbett Chamber Music Competition
Chamber music	80	1907	Gondoliera in E minor	for violin and piano	
Vocal	81	1907	Love Is a Rose	for voice and piano	words by Leah Durand
Chamber music	82	c.1907–1908	Allegro Appassionato in B minor	for viola and piano	
Chamber music	83	c.1907–1908	Morceau Characteristique	for violin and piano	
Orchestral	84	1908	Dance Rhapsody	for orchestra	
Vocal	85	1908	Dear, When I Look into Thine Eyes	for voice and piano	words by Heinrich Heine
Chamber music	86	1908	An Irish Melody	for 2 violins, viola and cello	movement I from Suite on Londonderry Air for string quartet, co-composed with Hamilton Harty, J. D. Davis, Eric Coates and York Bowen
Orchestral	86a	1908, 1938	An Irish Melody	for orchestra	original version for string quartet; based on The Londonderry Air
Chamber music	87	c.1908	3 Miniatures for Piano Trio, Set 1: 1. Minuet; 2. Gavotte; 3. Allegretto con moto	for violin, cello and piano	
Chamber music	88	c.1908	3 Miniatures for Piano Trio, Set 2: 1. Romance; 2. Intermezzo; 3. Salterello	for violin, cello and piano	
Chamber music	89	c.1908	3 Miniatures for Piano Trio, Set 3: 1. Valse Russe; 2. Hornpipe; 3. March Militaire	for violin, cello and piano	
Piano	90	c.1906–1908	?	for piano	"untitled" work
Choral	91	1909	Hilli-Ho! Hilli-Ho!	for mixed chorus a cappella	words by Thomas Moore
Choral	92	1909	O Weary Hearts	for mixed chorus a cappella	words by Henry Wadsworth Longfellow
Orchestral	93	1909–1910	Suite: 1. Prelude; 2. Intermezzo; 3. Nocturne; 4. Finale	for string orchestra	
Chamber music	94	1910	Phantasie Piano Quartet in F♯ minor	for violin, viola, cello and piano	
Incidental	95	1910	The Two Hunchbacks: 5 Entr'actes		incidental music for the play by Émile Cammaerts
Chamber music	96	1910	Cradle Song in F major	for violin or cello and piano	
Orchestral	97	1911	Coronation March (Animo et Fide)	for orchestra	written for a competition celebrating the new King George V
Incidental	98	1911	The Pageant of London	for military band and male chorus	incidental music for the Festival of Empire
Chamber music	99	1911	Mélodie in C♯ minor	for cello or violin and piano	
Orchestral	100	1910–1911	The Sea, Suite: 1. Seascape; 2. Sea Foam; 3. Moonlight; 4. Storm	for orchestra	
Chamber music	101	1911–1912	2 Pieces: 1. Caprice (D major); 2. Lament (C minor)	for 2 violas	1. incomplete
Vocal	102	1912	Isobel	for voice and piano	words by Digby Goddard-Fenwick
Vocal	103	c.1912	Easter Hymn (Ein frölicher Gesang)	for voice and piano	17th century German Hymn arrangement
Choral	103	c.1912	Easter Hymn (Ein frölicher Gesang)	for mixed chorus	original for voice and piano
Chamber music	104	c.1912	4 Short Pieces: 1. Meditation (C major); 2. Spring Song (G major); 3. Lullaby (D major); 4. Country Dance (B♭ major)	for violin or cello and piano	
Vocal	105	c.1912	O That It Were So	for voice and piano or orchestra	words by Walter Savage Landor
Organ	106	c.1901 1912 c.1901	Second Book of Organ Pieces: 1. Andante con moto (D♭ major); 2. Andantino (F minor); 3. Allegro ben moderato (B minor)	for organ	originally published in The Organ Loft, Books 100 (December 1913), 103 (March 1914), and 105 (May 1914)
Chamber music	107	1906–1912	String Sextet in E♭ major	for 2 violins, 2 violas and 2 cellos	
Piano	108	1901, 1912; 1912; 1912	3 Pieces: 1. Columbine; 2. Minuet; 3. Romance	for piano	published by Augener
Vocal	109	1913	Strew No More Red Roses	for voice and piano	words by Matthew Arnold
Choral	110	1913	The Bee	for mixed chorus a cappella	
Orchestral	111	1913	Dance Poem	for orchestra	
Piano	112	1913–1914; 1913; 1914; 1914; 1914	4 Characteristic Pieces: 1. Solitude; 2. Ecstasy; 3. Sunset; 4. Arabesque	for piano	published by Winthrop Rogers. First three published as 3 Poems with Arabesque published separately.
Vocal	113	1914	Where She Lies Asleep	for voice and piano or orchestra	words by Mary Elizabeth Coleridge
Vocal	114	1914	Love Went A-Riding	for voice and piano or orchestra	words by Mary Elizabeth Coleridge
Chamber music	115	1914–1915	String Quartet No. 2 in G Minor	for 2 violins, viola and cello	
Orchestral	116	1914–1915	Summer, Symphonic Poem	for orchestra	
Orchestral	117	1915	Lament (for Catherine, aged 9 "Lusitania" 1915)	for string orchestra	also a version for piano; commemorating the sinking of RMS Lusitania
Piano	117	1915	Lament for Catherine	for piano	original for string orchestra; commemorating the sinking of RMS Lusitania
Brass Band	117	1915	Lament for Catherine	for brass band (arr. Hindmarsh)	original for string orchestra; commemorating the sinking of RMS Lusitania
Orchestral	118	1915	2 Poems after Richard Jefferies: 1. The Open Air - Andante moderato e semplice 2. The Story of My Heart - Allegro con brio	for orchestra	
Chamber music	119	1916	2 Old English Songs: 1. Sally in Our Alley; 2. Cherry Ripe	for 2 violins, viola and cello	
Orchestral	119	1916	2 Old English Songs: 1. Sally in Our Alley; 2. Cherry Ripe	for string orchestra	original version for 2 violins, viola and cello
Piano	119	1916	2 Old English Songs: 1. Sally in Our Alley; 2. Cherry Ripe	for piano 4-hands	original version for 2 violins, viola and cello
Choral	120	1916	Lullaby	for female chorus and piano or string orchestra	words by Veronica Mason
Choral	121	1916	The Graceful Swaying Wattle	for 2-part chorus and piano or string orchestra	words by Veronica Mason
Choral	122	1916	For God and King and Right	for unison chorus and piano or orchestra	words by Veronica Mason
Choral	123	1916	Peter Piper	for chorus of 3 equal voices a cappella	traditional words
Vocal	124	1917	Thy Hand in Mine	for voice and piano or orchestra	words by Mary Elizabeth Coleridge
Chamber music	125	1913–1917	Sonata in D minor	for cello and piano	
Piano	126	1917	4 Characteristic Pieces: 1. Water Nymphs; 2. Fragrance; 3. Bittersweet; 4. Fireflies	for piano	published by Winthrop Rogers
Piano	127	1917	3 Miniature Pastorals, Set 1	for piano	published by Winthrop Rogers
Piano	128	1917	Fairy Tale, Suite: 1. The Princess; 2. The Ogre; 3. The Spell; 4. The Prince	for piano	published by Augener
Vocal	129	1917	To You in France	for voice and piano	words by Helen Dircks; incomplete
Vocal	130	1918	So Early in the Morning, O	for high voice and piano	words by James Stephens
Vocal	131	1918	Mantle of Blue	for voice and piano or orchestra	words by Padraic Colum
Vocal	132	1918	Blow Out, You Bugles	for tenor and orchestra, or piano with optional trumpet	words by Rupert Brooke
Chamber music	133	1918	Morning Song	for cello and piano	
Piano	134	1918	3 Improvisations: 1. At Dawn; 2. A Vigil; 3. A Revel	for piano left-hand	written for pianist Douglas Fox, who lost his right arm in World War I; published by Winthrop Rogers
Choral	135	1918	A Litany	for female chorus with organ ad libitum	words by Phineas Fletcher
Vocal	136	1918	The Last Invocation	for voice and piano	words by Walt Whitman
Choral	137	1918	Sister, Awake	for female chorus (sopranos) and piano	words by Thomas Bateson
Vocal	138	1918	Lay a Garland on My Hearse	for 2-part vocal canon with piano	words by Beaumont and Fletcher
Organ	139	1918	Lento (In Memoriam C.H.H.P.)	for organ	originally written for the funeral service of Hubert Parry; published by H.F.W. Deane and Sons (No. 7 of The Little Organ Book)
Choral	140	1916, 1918	A Prayer	for mixed chorus and orchestra	words by Thomas à Kempis
Vocal	141	1918	3 Variations on "Cadet Rousselle"	for voice and piano	collaboration with Arnold Bax, John Ireland and Eugene Goossens. Bridge composed verses 1, 3 and 6 of the 12-verse song.
Orchestral	141	1918	3 Variations on "Cadet Rousselle"	for orchestra	original version for voice and piano
Vocal	142	1919	When You Are Old	for high voice and piano	words by William Butler Yeats
Vocal	143	1919	Into Her Keeping	for voice and piano	words by Henry Dawson Lowry
Choral	144	1919	Lantido Dilly	for female chorus and piano	anonymous words (17th century)
Vocal	145	1919	What Shall I Your True Love tell?	for voice and piano	words by Francis Thompson
Vocal	146	1919	'Tis But a Week	for voice and piano	words by Gerald Gould
Piano	147	c.1919	The Turtle's Retort, One-step	for piano	originally published by Winthrop Rogers under the pseudonym John L. More
Piano	148	1919–1920	The Hour Glass, Suite: 1. Dusk; 2. The Dew Fairy; 3. The Midnight Tide	for piano	published by Augener
Piano	149	1921	3 Miniature Pastorals, Set 2	for piano	
Piano	150	1921	3 Miniature Pastorals, Set 3	for piano	
Piano		1921	Miniature Suite: 1. Chorale; 2. Impromptu; 3. Caprice; 4. March	for piano	assembled by Paul Hindmarsh (including movement titles) from material originally intended for the Miniature Pastorals
Piano	151	1921	Threads: 2 Intermezzi: 1. Andante molto moderato 2. Tempo di valse	for piano	incidental music to the play by Frank Stayton; orchestrated in 1938
Incidental	151	1921, 1938	Threads: 2 Intermezzi: 1. Andante molto moderato 2. Tempo di valse	for orchestra	incidental music to the play by Frank Strayton; original for piano
Piano	152	1921	In the Shop, Ballet	for piano 4-hands	
Choral	153	1922	Golden Slumbers	for female chorus a cappella	words by Thomas Dekker
Choral	154	1922	Hence care	for female chorus a cappella	anonymous words (1595)
Chamber music	155	1922	Sir Roger de Coverley: A Christmas Dance	for 2 violins, viola and cello	
Orchestral	155	1922	Sir Roger de Coverley: A Christmas Dance	for orchestra	original version for 2 violins, viola and cello
Orchestral	155	1922, 1938	Sir Roger de Coverley: A Christmas Dance	for string orchestra	original version for 2 violins, viola and cello
Choral	156	1922	The Fairy Ring	for female chorus with optional piano	anonymous words
Choral	157	1922	A Spring Song	for unison voices and piano or string orchestra	words by Mary Howitt
Choral	158	1922, 1924	Pan's Holiday	for female chorus and piano (1922) or string orchestra (1924)	words by James Shirley
Choral	159	1922	Evening Primrose	for female chorus and piano	words by John Clare
Piano	160	1921–1924	Sonata	for piano	sketches dated 1921–1922; published by Augener
Piano	161	1921–1924; 1921; 1922; 1924	3 Lyrics: 1. Heart's Ease; 2. Dainty Rogue; 3. The Hedgerow	for piano	published by Augener
Chamber music	161a	1921	Heart's Ease	for violin and piano	original for piano
Piano	162	1924	In Autumn: 1. Retrospect; 2. Through the Eaves	for piano	published by Augener
Chamber music	163	1925	The Pneu World	for cello and piano	parody on the opening bars of The Star-Spangled Banner
Vocal	164	1922–1925; 1922; 1924; 1925	3 Songs of Rabindranath Tagore: 1. Day after Day; 2. Speak to Me My Love; 3. Dweller in My Deathless Dreams	for voice and piano or orchestra	words by Rabindranath Tagore
Vocal	165	1925	Golden Hair	for voice and piano	words by James Joyce
Piano	166	1925	Vignettes de Marseille: 1. Carmelita; 2. Nicolette; 3. Zoraida; 4. En fête	for piano	3 movements also orchestrated as Vignettes de Danse; published by Thames Publishing
Orchestral	166	1925, 1938	Vignettes de Danse: 1. Nicolette; 2. Zoraida; 3. Carmelita	for orchestra	1938 orchestration of 3 movements from Vignettes de Marseille for piano
Vocal	167	1925	Journey's End	for tenor or high baritone and piano	words by Humbert Wolfe
Piano	168	1925	Winter Pastoral	for piano	published by Augener
Piano	169	1926	Canzonetta (Happy South)	for piano	also orchestrated; published by Hawkes and Sons
Orchestral	169	1926	Canzonetta (Happy South)	for small orchestra	original for piano
Piano	170	1926	Graziella	for piano	published by Hawkes and Sons
Piano	171	1926	A Dedication	for piano	published by Augener
Piano	172	c.1926	Hidden Fires	for piano	published by Hawkes and Sons
Orchestral	173	1927	There Is a Willow Grows Aslant a Brook, Impression	for small orchestra	title taken from Act IV of William Shakespeare's Hamlet; Benjamin Britten transcribed the work for viola and piano
Orchestral	174	1926–1927	Enter Spring, Rhapsody (Symphonic Poem)	for orchestra	
Chamber music	175	1925–1927	String Quartet No. 3	for 2 violins, viola and cello	
Chamber music	176	1928	Rhapsody Trio	for 2 violins and viola	
Piano	177	1928	Gargoyle	for piano	published by Thames Publishing
Chamber music	178	1928–1929	Piano Trio No. 2	for violin, cello and piano	
Opera	179	1909–1929	The Christmas Rose		Children's Opera in 3 scenes; libretto by Margaret Kemp-Welch and Constance Cotterell
Concertante	180	1929–1930	Oration, Concerto Elegiaco	for cello and orchestra	
Piano	181	1931	Todessehnsucht (Come Sweet Death)	for piano	
Orchestral	181	1931, 1936	Todessehnsucht (Come Sweet Death)	for string orchestra	original version for piano
Concertante	182	1931	Phantasm, Rhapsody	for piano and orchestra	
Chamber music	183	1932	Sonata	for violin and piano	
Orchestral	184	1934	A Royal Night of Variety, Finale	for orchestra	
Chamber music	185	1934	A Merry, Merry Xmas	for oboe, clarinet, trombone and piano	
Chamber music	186	c.1935–1936	Sonata	for viola and piano	incomplete, sketches only
Chamber music	187	c.1936	Movement for String Quartet	for 2 violins, viola and cello	
Chamber music	188	1937	String Quartet No. 4	for 2 violins, viola and cello	
Chamber music	189	1934–1938; 1937; 1937; 1937; 1938	Divertimenti: 1. Prelude; 2. Nocturne; 3. Scherzetto; 4. Bagatelle	for flute, oboe, clarinet and bassoon	first version dated 1934
Organ	190	1939	3 Pieces: 1. Prelude; 2. Minuet; 3. Processional	for organ	published by J. Curwen
Orchestral	191	1940	Rebus, Overture	for orchestra	
Orchestral	192	1940–1941	Allegro Moderato	for string orchestra	fragment of a Symphony

== Sources ==
- Hindmarsh, Paul. Frank Bridge: A Thematic Catalogue, 1900-1941. London: Faber Music, 1983.
- Hindmarsh, Paul. Frank Bridge: The Complete Works. Poynton: PHM Publishing, 2016
