= Geoffrey Poole =

English composer and educator

Geoffrey Richard Poole (born 9 February 1949 in Ipswich, Suffolk) is a contemporary classical composer and educator. His scores range from Western orchestral, choral, vocal, chamber, theatre and contemporary dance genres, to intercultural conceptions featuring Ghanean Drummer, Javanese Gamelan, or Korean traditional performers.

== Career ==
Poole's London debut for The King's Singers, Wymondham Chants, was an immediate hit in March 1971 and has since been toured to almost every country and widely distributed by recordings. Demonstrating the composer's early assuredness with the English Choral Tradition (enriched by his study of medieval music and the ethos of Benjamin Britten at the University of East Anglia), it led to requests for similar works. However Poole had, by then, undertaken studies with Alexander Goehr and Jonathan Harvey whose modernist influences were handled with increasing assuredness in the instrumental works of the 1970s, notably the Clements Prize-winning piano trio Algol Of Perseus (1973). His first orchestral work, Visions for Orchestra (1974-5) - was considered by Paul Griffiths as "strikingly true to its age ... so individual a work that it held its own alongside Delius's Brigg Fair and even the Walton (Belshazzar's Feast)".

In 1976, Poole was appointed to the Music Faculty of The University of Manchester, which was to be his base for the remainder of the century. By 1978, with Harmonice Mundi, inspired by the birth of his first daughter, his style moved away from 'modern music' in its long lines and transparent sonority. This became a feature in later works, for example the BBC-commissioned Chamber Concerto, the second string quartet, because it'Spring, Kakemono for harps, Firefinch for oboe and piano, and the I Ching piano pieces. This clarity was also present in teenage compositions such as the Sextet for piano and strings.

Of because it'Spring (1984, setting e.e.cummings poems for the 16-voice BBC Northern Singers) it has been said "Music of such imaginative poise and wit, so constantly surprising yet so constantly right, is rare indeed". The review also refers to Poole's "engagingly zig-zag path", a point developed in his New Grove Dictionary entry (2001): "To call Poole eclectic is an understatement; he is a classic blend of academic, maverick, craftsman, idealist and dissident."

Dissidence is certainly felt in the defiant mood of Ten (a response to the English summer of discontent in 1981), the Five Brecht Songs (1983) and a dystopian millennial black comedy of Lucifer (2000-1). His venture into composer-scripted music-theatre, Biggs V Stompp Does It Again (1982) combines characteristic political, emotional, and mystical concerns by personifying them. Stompp, the want-it-now tycoon, rants and has no music in him; Carey's full heart is conveyed by tonal lyricism, and the Greek waiter (actually Tyreseus the blind seer) resonates with spiritual authority. At the same time, Poole's irritation with political aggression, mechanised lifestyles, and the cramped ethos of the 'New Music Scene' in the early 1980s was a spur to not only absorb foreign elements (such as polyrhythmic drumming from West Africa, and inflected melody from Asian musics) but also to travel further afield to learn about them. A two-year residence at Kenyatta University in Nairobi 1985-87 was to prove seminal.

Around 1990, at the age of 40, a process of simplification and regeneration was complete and the ensuing decade was soon to prove a productive and influential one starting powerfully with the African vitality and hypnotic shimmering of String Quartet No.2 (commissioned by The Lindsays) and the glorious sea voyage score for the RNCM wind band, Sailing With Archangels. By 1993 increasing recognition brought a prestigious and well-attended portrait concert at the ICA, London, 'MusICA' curated by Adrian Jack. This was built around Poole's new half-hour concerto Two-Way Talking, for Ghanean drummer Kwesi Asare and chamber orchestra (Gemini) conducted by the composer. A fresh commission for the event was Septembral, initially overshadowed but later recognised as a primary work in the Poole canon. The early nineties also spawned the hour-long 'secular oratorio' Blackbird. Against the genre background of works like Elgar's Dream Of Gerontius and Britten's War Requiem he asserts the independence of "an obsessive, if undogmatic, experimenter ... [who] eschews notions of stylistic consistency in pursuit of solutions to specific ideas", for example in the careful design of a large canvas of seemingly unrelated stylistic references. Poole rejects the inference of 'eclecticism' if this means aping ready-made formuli: he sees the disjunctions as crucial - a set of koans, inviting the listener to sense subtler causes beneath the illusion of surfaces. It is thus not only in the vivid presence of music in flow, but in the silences, the discontinuities, and the timing of unnerving half-memories that his art reveals itself, bound together by voice rather than style. Blackbird received a five-minute ovation.

Having worked as a computer programmer while freelancing in Oxford in 1971-73, he was in a strong position to invent and write a computer programme which enables a 3-D representation of numerous musical notes (mapped in terms of x=time, y=pitch, z=intensity) to be viewed from a shifted vantage point as though walking around apples on a great tree, or flying over it. Developed in order to manage textural control of an image of the departed soul travelling past galaxies at the climax of Blackbird, Stellation has subtly joined African and Asian musical experiences among the compositional vocabularies available to Poole's later work. The highly acclaimed Crossing Ohashi Bridge (named after Hiroshige's print Sudden Shower over Shin-Ōhashi bridge and Atake) and Qigong, both commissioned for Manchester's virtuoso Goldberg Ensemble (11 strings), are illustrative of this.

In February 2004, the BBC salvaged a radically original concept first commissioned by the Halle Orchestra for the ISCM Festival in 1998, but cancelled at that time because of the orchestra's financial woes. Bringing together a full Javanese Gamelan and a 20-piece Western Orchestra, Swans Reflecting Elephants (reflecting Dali) is an extreme example of what had been said about the Drumming Concerto Two Way Talking: "Poole's way lies in finding common cause in the unfamiliar ... done with a skill and originality that reinforced the point. At times breathtaking in its synthesis and all done quite un-touristico." In the event, an entire BBC Music Diversity Week was built around the concept and entitled: Swans Reflecting Elephants. In recent years as audiences have become more pluralistic, critical views have shifted from Poole's zig-zag path to the consistency of personality and the characteristic precision of musical hearing and imagination. " From the start, Poole has sought a sound-world authentic to living here and now - not an easy task in an era where stylistic solutions are often shallow and passing." Revived earlier works are acclaimed for their resilience and freshness, and his back catalogue has increasing availability on CD (25 works to date) and through major publishers (Edition Peters, Maecenas). Tempo magazine's tribute to Poole at 60 identifies the 40-minute BBC Singers commissioned homage to Berio, The Colour Of My Song as the "single work that stands out as a faithful assemblage of Poole's entire compositional ethos". Composed in 2006 and in many ways building on Blackbird, this is in effect a 'vocality concerto' for 8 solo voices against an orchestra of 16 voices, harp and percussion. The Colour Of My Song deploys "a wide range of voices (from throaty and nasal aggressiveness to sporadic delicacies, and from 13th century Vietnamese song to Tudor part-song), diverse texts and musical eras are bound together through one image alone: wood. It burns, builds, binds, carries, decays, germinates and floats. Symbolically, wood is fire, life, growth, support, cross (the crucifixion), fence (protection and ownership)."

This free-association web of elemental musical symbolism and the feel for history connects The Colour Of My Song to the mysterious Avebury portrait in the mixed sextet Carved In Stone. Both relate to a series of piano miniatures begun in 2001, designed to match each of the 64 gua of the I Ching (hexagrams of The Chinese Book Of Changes). These miniatures have been premiered in sets such as The Book Of Stillness (received in London as "music of a strange and coherent beauty". The first 32 gua are now gathered into a published volume (Chinese Whispers), the first half of a vast compendium for curious pianists to roam in. Poole's Janus-faced preface is revealing: "Whereas John Cage famously used the I Ching for its random coin-tossing techniques to produce a very iconoclastic music, very 1950s, I sense a contemporary need for the renewal of endangered cultural traditions (Taoist and pianistic), moving forward by taking nourishment from the past."

In June 2007 Poole lost his wife of thirty years, the composer Beth Wiseman, to breast cancer endured since 1993. His compositions from 2007 to 2010 were sporadic and taut: miniatures such as the Yeats settings After Long Silence, a beguiling duo for traditional Korean players Diary of a Cherry, and a controversial contribution to the NMC Songbook Heynonnynonny Smallprint. His command of dramatic form and arresting colour are fully recovered in the extended orchestral movement of 2011, Shumei, Shumei. However, retirement in 2009 from the position of Professor at Bristol University has opened the way for new activity, as producer of a CD of Wiseman's finely composed, intense yet reticent music (Birdsongs In Silence), and the revival of earlier skills as pianist. In 2012 he brought out a CD in which his string works are interspersed by his performances of piano pieces presented in tribute by twenty former composition students (Joyous Lake). Writing music to film, and commitment to concert activity (for example as duo partner to violinist Madeleine Mitchell and conductor of a Gloucestershire choir) may be among the factors bringing conciseness and simplicity to many of his more recent compositions. However this is also in keeping with a broader cultural tendency of the time.

== Principal works ==
Orchestral -

- (1975) Visions
- (1979) Chamber Concerto
- (1982) The Net and Aphrodite
- (1986) Woodscapes
- (1993) Blackbird
- (2011) Shumei Shumei.
- (2015) Rhapsody for Violin and Orchestra

Wind and Brass -

- (1991) Sailing With Archangels
- (2002) Lucifer (piano concerto with brass)
- (2011) Zygotic Variations
- (2016) Greenshaft Sonata

String Orchestra -

- (1974) Fragments
- (1995) Crossing Ohashi Bridge
- (1997) Schubert's Relique
- (1999) Qigong
- (2017) Nairobi Sky

Choral -

- (1970) Wymondham Chants (SATB version is Wymondham Choruses)
- (1986) Imerina,
- (1984) Because it'Spring
- (1992) The Magnification Of The Virgin
- (1993) Blackbird
- (2006) The Colour Of My Song
- (2013) Angels Also Die (IM Jonathan Harvey)
- (2013) The Ballad of Halloween Hag

Vocal -

- (1977) Machaut Layers
- (1978) Calligrammes d'Apollinaire
- (1982) Five Brecht Songs
- (1985) Bone Of Adam
- (2008) After Long Silence
- (2008) Heynonnynonny Smallprint
- (2012) Utopia
- (2014) The Eye of the Blackbird
- (2016) Lost Lieder (3 Volumes)

Chamber -

- (1978) Harmonice Mundi (piano and string quartet)
- (1982) Slow Music (piano and four winds)
- (1983) String Quartets 1
- (1990) String Quartet No.2
- (1993) Septembral
- (1996) The Impersonal Touch (two pianos)
- (1997) String Quartet No.3
- (1998) Firefinch (oboe and piano)
- (2004) Kakemono (two harps)
- (2006) Carved In Stone (mixed sextet)
- (2009) The Sheltering Bell (String Quartet No.4)
- (2010) Hanami Sanjo (viola, cello, piano: adapted from Diary Of A Cherry)
- (2013) City Square (recorder, string quartet)
- (2014) Les Ramages (baroque trio)
- (2015) Rhapsody for Violin and Piano
- (2015) Zhang Seascapes (String Quartet No.5)

Piano and unaccompanied virtuoso solos-

- (1981) Ten (piano)
- (1984) Nocturnes (piano)
- (1996) On The High Wire (cello)
- (2005) Commodo Dragonfly (bass clarinet)
- (2009) Chinese Whispers (piano, I Ching Books I to VIII)
- (2011) Footfall (bass recorder or bass flute)

Non-European -

- (1991) Two Way Talking (Akom drums and five ensembles)
- (1998) Swans Reflecting Elephants (Javanese Gamelan and 20 players)
- (2008) Diary of a Cherry (Korean bass haegum and kayagam)

Educational -

- (1977) Skally Skarekrow's Whistling Book
- (1999) Skally Skarekrow's Night Watch
- (2011) Africa Notebook (in Forsyths Recorder Vol. 5)
