= Philip Sawyers =

British classical composer (born 1951)

Philip Sawyers (born 20 June 1951) is a British composer of orchestral and chamber music, including six symphonies.

Sawyers was born in London. He began composing as a teenager, studying at Dartington College of Arts in Devon with Colin Sauer (violin) and Helen Glatz (composition), and then at the Guildhall School of Music where his teachers were Joan Spencer and Max Rostal (violin), and Buxton Orr, Patric Standford and Edmund Rubbra (composition).

From 1973 Sawyers worked as an orchestral violinist with the Royal Opera House Orchestra, Covent Garden. He was a violin coach for the Kent County Youth Orchestra, and a visiting teacher at schools and colleges. In 1997 he spent a year in postgraduate study at Goldsmiths College. From 2000-2013 he was an examiner for the Associated Board of the Royal Schools of Music.

== Music ==
Sawyers has mostly composed in traditional forms with few programmatic overtones. His first works date from his time as a student in the late 1960s and early 1970s. One of those pieces, the Symphonic Music for Strings and Brass (1972), was taken up and performed by the Grand Rapids Symphony Orchestra in the USA, and in 2011 was recorded alongside his Symphony No 1 (2004). Since then many of his more recent orchestral works have been recorded. There are six symphonies (spanning 2004-2022), multiple concertos, an hour-long oratorio Mayflower on the Sea of Time (2018, libretto by Philip Groom) as well as chamber music and songs.

Orchestral

- Divertimento for string orchestra (1970)
- Symphonic Music for Strings and Brass (1972)
- Meditation for string orchestra (1995)
- Symphony No. 1 (2004)
- The Gale of Life concert overture (2006)
- Symphony No. 2 (2007)
- Hommage to Kandinsky, symphonic poem for orchestra (2013)
- Symphony No. 3 (2016)
- The Valley of Vision, tone poem for orchestra (2017)
- Symphony No. 4 (2017)
- Remembrance for string orchestra (2020)
- Symphony No. 5 (2021)
- Symphony No 6 (2022)

Concertante

- Four Poems for flute and string orchestra (1971)
- Concertante for violin, piano and string orchestra (2006)
- Cello Concerto (2010)
- Concerto for Trumpet, Strings and Timpani (2015)
- Violin Concerto (2016)
- Elegiac Rhapsody for trumpet and strings (2016, also for trumpet and piano)
- Double Concerto (2020)
- Viola Concerto (2020)

Chamber

- String Quartet No.1 (1968)
- Piano Quintet (1968)
- Clarinet Quintet (1969)
- Divertimento for bassoon and string quartet (1969)
- Chamber Music for 10 players (1970)
- Pastoral for wind quintet (1970)
- String Quartet No.2 (1975)
- Woodwind Quintet (1975)
- String Quartet (1977)
- Elegy for string quartet (1984)
- Octet for strings (1985)
- Octet (for mixed ensemble) (2007)
- String Quartet No 3 (2008)
- Movement for string quartet (2012)
- Bagatelle for String Quartet (2022)

Instrumental

- Violin Sonata No. 1 (1969)
- Sentimental Piece for cello and piano (1978)
- Nocturne for cello and piano (1981)
- Homage to Haydn for solo piano (1981)
- Movement for solo cello (1993)
- Violin Sonata No. 2 (2011)
- Sonata for basset horn and piano (2011)

Vocal and choral

- Two songs for baritone and piano (1969)
- Gloria, for use in church service (1985)
- Four Shropshire Songs for soprano, clarinet and string quartet (2005)
- Songs of Loss and Regret for soprano and piano (2014, orchestrated 2015)
- Three Shakespeare Songs for unaccompanied choir (2017)
- Mayflower on the Sea of Time oratorio (2018)
