= Walter Willson Cobbett =

English amateur musician (1847–1937)

Walter Willson Cobbett CBE
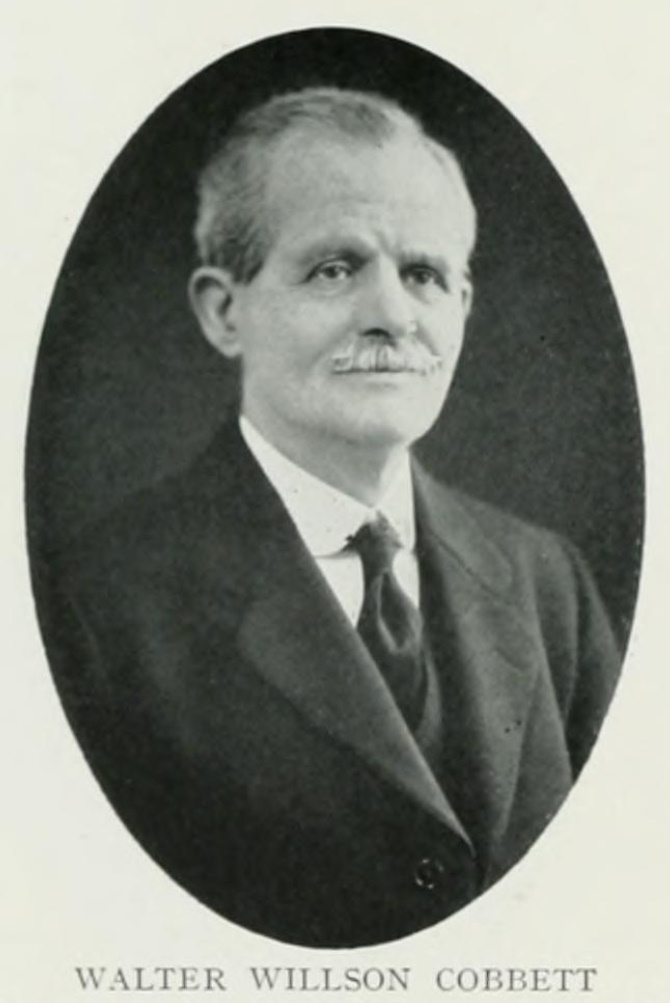
- Born: 11 July 1847; Blackheath, England
- Died: 22 January 1937 (aged 89); London, England
- Occupations: Businessman; amateur violinist
- Spouse: Ada Florence (née Sells)

Walter Willson Cobbett CBE (11 July 1847 – 22 January 1937) was an English businessman, amateur violinist and an influential patron of British chamber music from the decade before World War I until he died in 1937. He was an innovative and astute businessman with an enthusiasm for the composition and performance of chamber music. Cobbett's business successes enabled him to focus on his musical interests from about 1905.

Cobbett sponsored a series of competitions for the composition of new chamber music works by British composers and endowed the Cobbett Medal for services to chamber music. He devised and encouraged the adaptation of a short musical form called a 'phantasy'. He compiled and edited the two-volume Cobbett's Cyclopedic Survey of Chamber Music, published in 1929, a comprehensive review of the musical genre.

== Biography ==
=== Early years ===
Walter Willson Cobbett was born on 11 July 1847 at Blackheath in south-east London. His father was a businessman "of literary and musical tastes".

Young Walter was sent to France and Germany "as a supplement to his education", where he received private tuition. In about 1861, when he was aged fourteen, Cobbett received a Guadagnini violin from his father and he began studying the instrument with Joseph Dando, who introduced chamber music to his young student. Cobbett was overtaken by a "consuming enthusiasm" for the musical genre when he heard the Hungarian violinist Joseph Joachim lead a quartet performing Beethoven compositions at St. James's Hall in London. Cobbett later described the experience as akin to the opening of "an enchanted world". He wrote: "From that moment onward I became a very humble devotee of this infinitely beautiful art, and so began for me the chamber music life".

=== Music and business ===
Cobbett began his business life as an underwriter employed by Lloyd's of London. He later worked in journalism, as a foreign correspondent.

By the late 1870s, Cobbett had established his own business in London selling industrial goods. Cobbett was on vacation in Sweden where he met William Fenton, a Scotsman working as the weaving manager at a Swedish textile mill. Fenton had invented a sturdy twill woven belt for driving machinery, an improvement on the leather and canvas belts then being used on machines. Cobbett recognised a business opportunity and formed a partnership with Fenton to sell and market the product in Britain. In 1879 Fenton moved with his family from Sweden to Dundee in Scotland, where he established a factory to manufacture the woven belt material, the entire output of which was sold from Cobbett's offices in London. The partnership was successful, and within four years both men moved to larger premises. In 1883 the manufacturing plant was transferred to Stanley in Perthshire. By the late 1880s Fenton's two sons became involved in the business, forming their own company.

Cobbett played chamber music regularly at home and was involved with several amateur orchestras including the Strolling Players' Orchestral Society, formed in about 1890.

Walter Willson Cobbett and Ada Florence Sells were married in 1889 at Lambeth in South London.

=== Scandinavia Belting ===
In August 1897 the businesses of the Fenton brothers and Cobbett were incorporated under the name of W. Willson Cobbett Ltd., with Cobbett as the chairman of directors. William Fenton died in 1898, after which W. Willson Cobbett Ltd. acquired his company (William Fenton & Co.). In 1901 the business moved both its production and sales facilities to Cleckheaton in West Yorkshire, which became known as the Scandinavia Mills. In 1902 Charles Treiber and George Beach formed an agency in Boston to sell Scandinavia belting imported from the United Kingdom. Treiber had emigrated to the United States several years earlier, and had formerly been in a business partnership with Eugene Bartikeit, the export director of W. Willson Cobbett Ltd. In May 1904, Treiber and Beach formed the Scandinavia Belting Co. in Boston as a subsidiary of W. Willson Cobbett Ltd. The head-office was relocated to New York as trade continued to flourish.

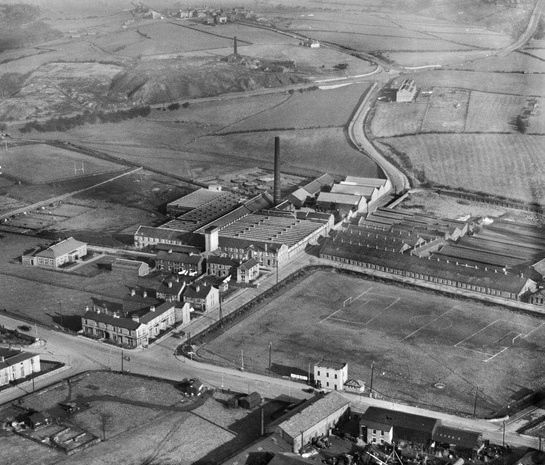
The British Belting & Asbestos Ltd. (Scandinavia Belting Mill) at Cleckheaton in West Yorkshire, photographed in 1933.

From about 1907, having become independently wealthy, Cobbett began to focus less attention on his business in favour of his musical interests. His biographical entry in Grove's Dictionary of Music and Musicians, written when Cobbett was aged about 80, says, "it has been humorously remarked of him that he has given to commerce what time he could spare from music". Cobbett himself claimed that he retired "at the age of sixty" to "devote myself to what I consider to be my life's work" as a promoter and proponent of chamber music. But despite the shift in focus when he turned 60, Cobbett continued to maintain close connections with his business interests in his later life. He remained chairman of the company until he died in 1937.

The years before World War I began a boom period for Cobbett's company. From 1908, large quantities of belting began to be ordered by Henry Ford, used as transmission linings in the Ford Motor Company's Model T motor vehicle. Over the following years the Cleckheaton factory increased production of transmission linings, eventually producing linings for other automobile manufacturers such as Morris, Austin and Vauxhall in the United Kingdom and Renault and Bugatti in France. In 1911 the name of the British parent company was changed to Scandinavia Belting Ltd. In 1912 Beach resigned from the US subsidiary and sold his shares to the parent company, by which process Scandinavia Belting Co. became a wholly owned subsidiary of Scandinavia Belting Ltd. During World War I production at Cleckheaton was primarily switched to the supply of specialist military equipment.

In 1920 Scandinavia Belting Ltd., with Cobbett chairing the board of directors, acquired a competitor, British Asbestos Co. Ltd., and expanded its production facilities. In 1923 the company expanded its manufacturing capability to the United States, establishing a belting factory in Paterson, New Jersey. In 1925 Scandinavia Belting Ltd. and British Asbestos Co. formally merged under the name British Belting & Asbestos Ltd. (BB&A Ltd.). By the early 1920s, Cobbett was also a director of W. F. Stanley and Co. Ltd., manufacturers of surveying and microscopic equipment.

=== Music patronage ===
In 1904, Cobbett delivered a lecture titled 'The Violin Family and its Music' during the Music Loan Exhibition by the Worshipful Company of Musicians, a musicians' guild that originated in London in the medieval period. The exhibition of ancient musical instruments, rare books and manuscripts, scores and musical mementos, on loan from collectors, was held at the Fishmongers' Hall (adjacent to London Bridge) in June and July 1904.

In May 1905, Cobbett was elected a member of the Worshipful Company of Musicians. At the same meeting of his membership acceptance, he offered 50 guineas as first prize in a composition competition to be organised under the auspices of the Musicians' Company. The competition was named the Cobbett Musical Competition. It was open only to "British subjects" to submit for judging a musical composition called a 'phantasy', in the form of a string quartet for two violins, a viola and a violoncello. The 'phantasy' was Cobbett's modern conception of an older genre, short pieces for viols called 'fancies' or 'fantasies' from the 16th and 17th centuries by composers such as William Byrd and Orlando Gibbons. Under the terms of the competition a 'phantasy' was a piece up to 12 minutes long that "may consist of different sections varying in tempi and rhythms". Charles Stanford later defined a 'phantasy' as "a condensation of the three or four movements of a sonata into a single movement of moderate dimensions". The competition's stated object was "to popularise the String Quartet among general audiences, and to endeavour to bring into life a new Art Form providing fresh scope for the composers of Chamber Music".

Cobbett sponsored five separate chamber music competitions between 1905 and 1919, all but one of which were restricted to British composers. Each competition entailed the composition of phantasies, or other chamber music forms, for different combinations of instruments or in a specific style. The Worshipful Company of Musicians assisted with funding for the first two competitions, after which Cobbett became the sole sponsor.

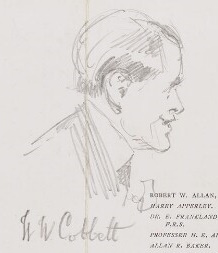
A pencil sketch of Walter Willson Cobbett by Fred Roe (January 1924).

- In 1905 the competition called for the composition of a phantasy for a string quartet. The panel of judges included the composer Alexander Mackenzie, Royal Academy of Music professor Alfred Gibson, and the Belgian violinist Hermann Sternberg. Sixty-seven manuscripts were received, and six prizes were awarded. The winner received 50 guineas. Other prizes awarded were ten pounds for second place, a special prize, and three consolation prizes of five guineas each.
- The second competition in 1907 required a phantasy composition for a piano trio (a piano, violin and cello). Sixty-seven manuscripts were received, and six prizes were awarded.
- The third competition in 1909 differed from the first two in several ways. The competition was international, attracting 134 entries, and called for a musical composition in sonata form.
- The competition in 1915 required a composition for a string quartet in a sonata, suite or phantasy form, with Cobbett specifying that the two violin parts be of equal importance. Forty-five works were submitted.
- The competition in 1917 required a musical composition for a string quartet or piano trio based on English, Welsh, Scottish or Irish folksongs.
- The 1919 competition called for a "Dance Phantasy" for a string quartet or piano trio, described as a work of moderate length that may be a "ballet in miniature" or music that "contains the soul of the dance and lends itself to dance interpretation".

During the period of his sponsorship of the chamber music competitions, Cobbett also directly commissioned several works from emerging and leading British composers. Eleven of his commissioned compositions, each in the phantasy form, were composed and published between 1910 and 1912. By 1915 another 13 new chamber works "could be credited to Cobbett's activities". One of the works commissioned in 1912 was Phantasy String Quintet with Two Violas by Ralph Vaughan Williams, which Cobbett later called "A piece of music which represents so exactly the phantasy as I conceived it that it may well serve as prototype to those who care to write in this form in the future".

Cobbett was a prolific writer and publicist for chamber music. He published articles in The Strad magazine and contributed 60 articles to Grove's Dictionary of Music and Musicians. From June 1913 to November 1916, Cobbett was responsible for the issue of a monthly series of 'Chamber Music' supplements, published with each issue of The Music Student, a newsletter produced by the Royal College of Music.

After the outbreak of World War I Cobbett served as a member of the Music in War-Time Committee, which sought to safeguard British musicians' interests during the conflict. The committee organised concerts at military camps and hospitals, providing paid engagements for musicians and entertainment for serving and wounded soldiers. Concerts were also given in social clubs for the wives of armed forces personnel. In 1916 the work of the committee was extended to factories, providing lunchtime concerts for munitions workers.

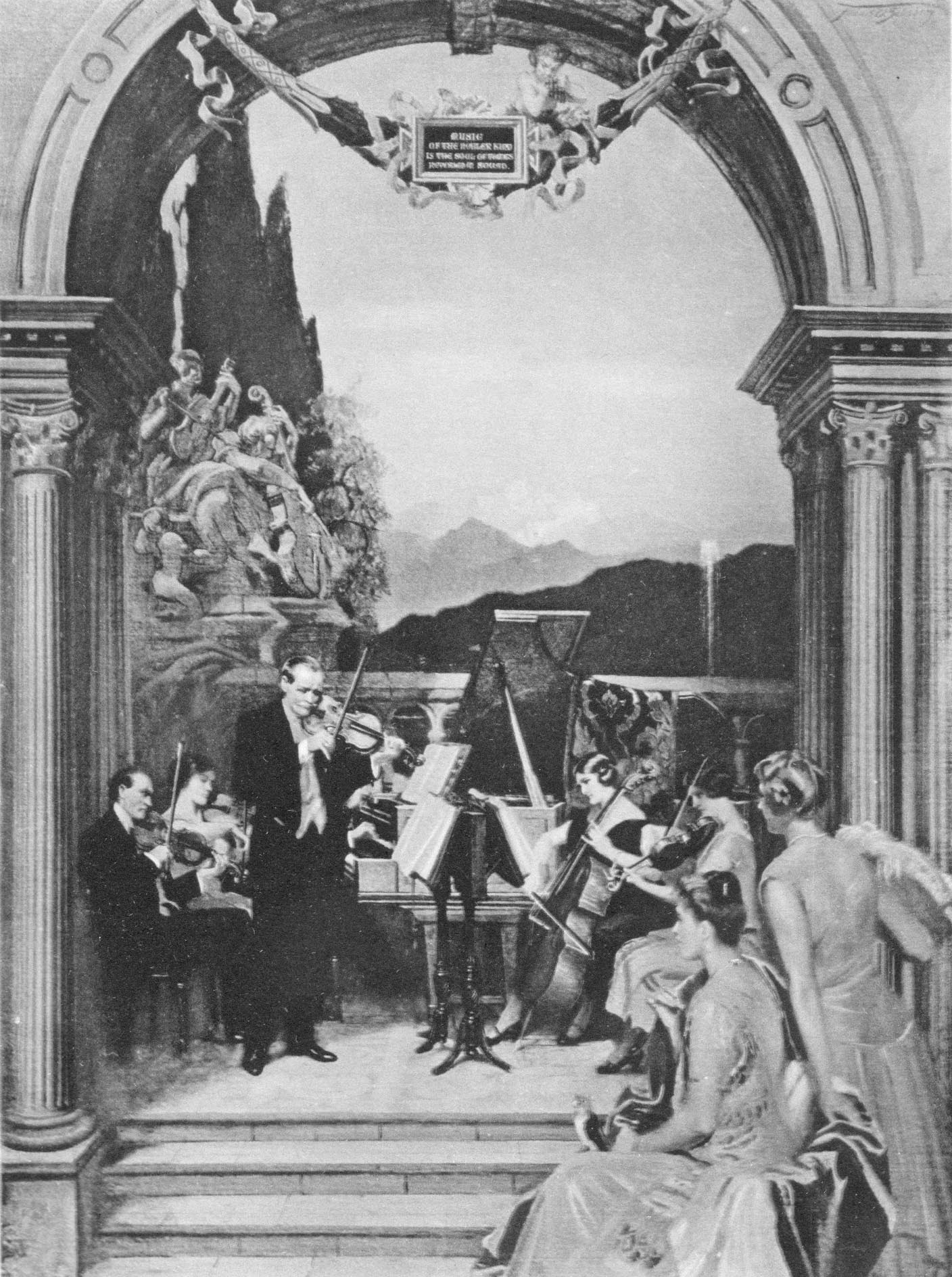
Cobbett playing with his amateur ensemble; a monochrome image of The Concert Party, a painting by Frank Owen Salisbury (1929).

In 1918 Cobbett established, at his own expense, a Free Library of Chamber Music in conjunction with the Society of Women Musicians. The library was a collection of chamber music, sonatas, trios, quartets and quintets that could be borrowed or purchased.

Cobbett was the owner of "a fine collection of Cremona violins". In 1918 and 1923 he sponsored competitions for violins made by British luthiers. Concerts were held at Aeolian Hall by musicians using the submitted instruments, with the audience participating in the voting.

Between 1920 and 1927 Cobbett sponsored a series of annual prizes for various forms of chamber music activity at the Royal College of Music. He awarded 50-guinea prizes for the study of chamber music, encompassing both composition and performance. In 1928 these prizes were permanently established by an endowment from Cobbett. In some cases his prizes led to the establishment of groups that continued to perform on a professional basis.

In 1924, Cobbett established a medal through the Worshipful Company of Musicians, endowed by his initial £50 contribution: the Walter Willson Cobbett Medal. A silver gilt medal is presented annually to a distinguished recipient in recognition of their services to chamber music. In 1928-29 Cobbett served as Master of the Worshipful Company of Musicians.

Cobbett provided funding to the British Federation of Musical Competition Festivals to start the summer school of chamber music at Bangor in North Wales. He became a regular visitor to the summer schools and "delighted to take out his violin and join in the practices".

In the mid-1920s, Cobbett began working on his Cyclopedic Survey of Chamber Music, which was published in 1929. A writer for The Review of Reviews said Cobbett's encyclopedia detailed aspects of chamber music "in every conceivable way, by instrument, by composer, by ensemble, and so on". Important works of the genre were analysed in detail,l and articles covered its history and aesthetics. In addition to his own extensive contributions, the survey includes articles by leading musicians and musicologists of the time, including Vincent d'Indy, Donald Tovey, and Ralph Vaughan Williams. One reviewer wrote that "some of the articles in the first volume are little masterpieces". Another review said the editor's writing style had "a note of keen, if somewhat naïve, enthusiasm", though it was pointed out that "the actual scholarship is amply supplied by other hands". The reviewer wrote that "the cyclopedia provides the facts in a well-ordered manner", but the information is "apt to get lost in a haystack of personal opinions".

=== Last years ===
Cobbett's wife Ada died in 1932. She was buried on 5 September 1932 at Charlton Kings, near Cheltenham in Gloucestershire.

In the New Year honours in January 1933, Cobbett was awarded a Commander of the Most Excellent Order of the British Empire (CBE). In 1934 he founded the Chamber Music Association, with an initial gift of one thousand pounds, to foster chamber music activity.

Cobbett "continued to play the violin into extreme old age and retained astonishing vigour and clarity of mind up till the end".

On 22 January 193,7 Cobbett died of influenza at his home at 34 Avenue Road, St. John's Wood in London, aged 89. He was buried at the Nunhead cemetery.

In Cobbett's will, £100 was left to the Worshipful Company of Musicians and £300 to the Society of Women Musicians, "mainly for the upkeep of the Cobbett Free Library". Cobbett's music collection was bequeathed to the Chamber Music Society. The beneficiary of Cobbett's interest in British Belting & Asbestos Ltd. was Arthur Anselm Pearson, who had been with the business since 1889 and a director of the company since 1912.

== Legacy ==
=== Cobbett Musical Competitions ===
The Cobbett chamber music competitions were instrumental in advancing the careers of leading and emerging British composers. The major prize-winners of the six chamber music competitions sponsored by W. W. Cobbett were:

1905 Cobbett Competition for Phantasy String Quartet

Prize awarded	Composer	Title of Work	Prize amount
First	William Yeates Hurlstone	Phantasie in A minor and A major	50 guineas
Second	Haydn Wood	Phantasy in F major	£10
Special	Frank Bridge	Phantasie for String Quartet in F minor	£10

The winner of the 1905 competition, William Hurlstone, died following an asthma attack only a year after the prize was awarded.

1907 Cobbett Competition for Phantasy Piano Trio

Prize awarded	Composer	Title of Work	Prize amount
First	Frank Bridge	Phantasie for Piano Trio in C minor	£50
Second	James Friskin	Phantasie for Piano Trio in E minor	£10
Third	John Ireland	Phantasie in A minor	£10

1909 Cobbett Competition for a Sonata for Violin and Piano

Prize awarded	Composer	Title of Work	Prize amount
First	John Ireland	Violin Sonata No. 1 in D minor	£40
Second	Eric Gritton		£30
Third	Geoffrey O'Connor Morris		£15

1915 Cobbett Competition for String Quartet (in Sonata, Suite, or Phantasy form)

Prize awarded	Composer	Title of Work	Prize amount
First (phantasy form)	Albert Sammons	Phantasy Quartet in B major	£25
First (sonata form)	Frank Bridge	String Quartet No. 2 in G minor	£25
Second (sonata form)	William Henry Reed	String Quartet No. 5 in A minor	

1917 Cobbett Competition for a Folksong Phantasy

Prize awarded	Composer	Title of Work	Prize amount
First (string quartet)	Harry Waldo Warner	Folk-song Phantasy 'Dance to Your Daddy'	25 guineas
Second (string quartet)	Herbert Howells	Phantasy String Quartet in C major, Op. 25	10 guineas
Third (string quartet)	Edward Norman Hay	On Three Irish Tunes: Lisnagarvey, The Banks of Clandy, Sally Kelly	5 guineas
First (piano trio)	James Cliffe Forrester	Folk Song Phantasy	25 guineas
Second (piano trio)	Arnold Trowell	Trio on Ancient Irish Folk-tunes	10 guineas
Third (piano trio)	Geoffrey O'Connor Morris		5 guineas

1919 Cobbett Competition for a Dance Phantasy for Piano and Strings

Prize awarded	Composer	Title of Work	Prize amount
First	Cecil Armstrong Gibbs	The Enchanted Wood	£50
Second	Cecil Hazlehurst	The Red Plague	£15
Supplementary	Maud Emily Marshall	Phantasy Piano Trio	

=== Commissions (1910-1912) ===
- Frank Bridge: Phantasy in F-sharp Minor for piano quartet (1910)
- James Friskin: Phantasy in F Minor for piano quintet (1910)
- Benjamin Dale: Phantasy for viola and piano (1911)
- Thomas Dunhill: Phantasy Trio for piano, violin, and viola (1911)
- James McEwen: Phantasy String Quintet with two cellos (1911)
- Ethel Barns: Phantasy Trio for two violins and piano (1911)
- Ralph Vaughan Williams: Phantasy String Quintet with two violas (1912)
- Richard Walthew: Phantasy Piano Quintet in E Minor (1912)
- Bertram Walton O’Donnell: Phantasy for cello and piano (1912)
- Donald Tovey: Phantasy for clarinet quintet (1912)
- York Bowen: Phantasy for violin and piano (1912)

=== Cobbett composition prizes at the Royal College of Music, 1923-50 ===
(sources: The RCM Magazine, issues 24-46 (1928–50); Cobbett's Cyclopedic Survey, 1, pp. 288–9)

- 1923: A Davies Adams, Celtic Phantasy for string quartet; H. Strickland-Constable, Phantasy for string quartet
- 1928: Imogen Holst, Phantasy for string quartet; Grace Williams, Quintet for piano and strings
- 1930: Helen Perkin, Phantasy Quartet; Elizabeth Maconchy, Phantasy Quintet
- 1931: Helen Hunter, Phantasy Trio for strings; Brian Easdale, Phantasy Trio for strings
- 1932: Lilian Harris, Phantasy Trio; Benjamin Britten, Phantasy Quintet
- 1933: Stanley Bate, Phantasy String Quartet
- 1934: Mary Couper, Phantasy Quintet; Miriam Hyde, Phantasy Quartet
- 1935: Cedric Thorpe Davie, String Quartet; Roger Fiske, Piano Trio
- 1936: William Reed, String Quartet; Roger Fiske, Fantasia for string quartet
- 1937: Inglis Gundry, Fantasia for string quartet; Douglas Bridger, Fantasy Quintet for strings
- 1938: Dulcie Holland, Fantasia Trio; Archie J Potter, Fantasy for string trio
- 1939: Douglas Lilburn, Fantasia String Quartet; Wallace Ross, String Quartet
- 1940: Joan Trimble, Phantasy Trio; Ruth Gipps, Sabrina string quartet
- 1941: Ruth Gipps, Brocade piano quartet; Malcolm Arnold, Vita Abundans string quartet
- 1942: Leonard Salzedo, String Quartet; Raymond O'Connell, Phantasy String Quartet in E minor
- 1946: David Gow (first prize); Hugo Cole (second prize)
- 1947: William Blezard, Phantasy String Quartet; Maxwell Ward, Fantasie for string quartet
- 1948: John Buckland (first prize); Stephen Dodgson (second prize)
- 1950: David Barlow (first prize); Ronald Tremain (second prize)

=== Free Library of Chamber Music ===
The Free Library of Chamber Music, originally financed by Cobbett, was maintained by the Society of Women Musicians until the society disbanded in 1972.

=== The Cobbett Medal ===
The first recipient of the Cobbett Medal in 1924 was the composer Thomas Dunhill. The medal continues to be awarded annually by the Worshipful Company of Musicians (in more recent times known as the Musicians' Company).

=== The Cyclopedic Survey ===
A modern assessment of Cobbett's Cyclopedic Survey of Chamber Music (from Grove Music Online): "In spite of a highly idiosyncratic editorial style and some inconsistency in the level of coverage between volumes, the Cyclopedic Survey represents an important lexicographical achievement and remains a vital historical document of British attitudes towards chamber music in the inter-war years".

=== Cobbett Association ===
The Cobbett Association for Chamber Music Research was founded in 1990, named in honour of W. W. Cobbett, to disseminate information about lesser-known chamber music of merit. The Association ceased operation in 2010.

=== The New Cobbett Prize ===
2015 to present.

The New Cobbett Prize for Chamber Music was instigated in 2014 by the Berkeley Ensemble to build upon Cobbett's legacy. The first winner was Sequenza for string quartet by Samuel Lewis.

== Publications ==
- Walter Willson Cobbett (1913–16), Chamber Music, a supplement to The Music Student (No. 1-22a June 1913 - November 1916), London: Home Music Study Union.
- Walter Willson Cobbett (editor) (1929), Cobbett's Cyclopedic Survey of Chamber Music (two volumes), London: Oxford University Press.
- Walter Willson Cobbett & Sidney Dark (editors) (1932), Fleet Street: An Anthology of Modern Journalism, London: Eyre & Spottiswoode.

== See also ==
- Walter Willson Cobbett Medal
- Cobbett Association
- Clements Memorial Prize
- Charles Lucas Medal
