= Walter Willson Cobbett Medal =

American chamber music award

The Walter Willson Cobbett Medal is awarded annually by the Worshipful Company of Musicians "in recognition of services to Chamber Music". It was established in 1924 and endowed with £50 by Walter Willson Cobbett (1847–1937), an amateur violinist and expert on chamber music who went on to serve as the company's master in 1928–29. Cobbett had previously instigated the Cobbett Competition for chamber music (from 1905), and later was the primary author of the two volume Cobbett's Cyclopedic Survey of Chamber Music, first published in 1929.

The first recipient of the medal in 1924 was Thomas Dunhill, a committed composer of chamber music who had also set up an annual series of concerts in London to perform British works: his concerts ran from 1907 until 1919 and included the music of several subsequent winners of the Cobbett medal, including Ralph Vaughan Williams and Charles Wood. The following year the award went to the American patron of music Elizabeth Sprague Coolidge, founder of the Berkshire Music Festival in Massachusetts. Coolidge showed an affinity for British music from the first event in 1918, but the 1923 Festival in particular was programmed to be a showcase for modern British composers. Included were chamber works by Arnold Bax, Frank Bridge, Rebecca Clarke, Benjamin Dale and Eugene Goossens.

The Cobbett Medal was registered as a charity in 1964. The medal itself, designed by Gilbert Bayes, is silver-gilt and features a portrait of Ludwig van Beethoven.

== Recipients ==
- 1924: Thomas Dunhill
- 1925: Elizabeth Sprague Coolidge (United States)
- 1926: Alfred J. Clements
- 1927: Harry Waldo Warner
- 1928: Edward Elgar
- 1929: Frank Bridge
- 1930: Ralph Vaughan Williams
- 1931: Arnold Bax
- 1932: John Ireland
- 1933: Charles Wood (awarded posthumously)
- 1934: Cecil Armstrong Gibbs
- 1935: Richard Watkins
- 1936: Donald Tovey
- 1937: Pablo Casals
- 1938: Ivor James
- 1939: Herbert Withers
- 1940: Isolde Menges
- 1942: Ernest Walker
- 1943: Sidney Griller
- 1944: Myra Hess
- 1945: Herbert Walenn
- 1946: Lionel Tertis
- 1947: William Walton
- 1948: Michael Tippett
- 1949: Gordon Jacob
- 1950: Dennis Brain
- 1951: Gerald Moore
- 1952: Frederick Thurston
- 1953: Arthur Bliss
- 1954: Leon Goossens
- 1955: Edmund Rubbra
- 1956: Arthur Benjamin
- 1957: Thurston Dart
- 1958: Kathleen Long
- 1959: Yehudi Menuhin
- 1960: George Malcolm
- 1961: Lennox Berkeley
- 1962: Anne Macnaghten
- 1963: Norbert Brainin
- 1964: Emmanuel Hurwitz
- 1965: Joan Dickson
- 1966: Howard Ferguson
- 1967: Kenneth Leighton
- 1968: Elizabeth Maconchy
- 1969: Hugh Bean
- 1970: Cecil Aronowitz
- 1971: Watson Forbes
- 1972: Denis Matthews
- 1975: Janet Craxton
- 1976: Gordon Crosse
- 1977: Ivor Newton
- 1978: Wilfrid Parry
- 1979: Edwin Roxburgh
- 1981: Hugh Maguire
- 1985: Christopher Hogwood
- 1986: Philip Jones
- 1987: Peter Maxwell Davies
- 1988: Evelyn Barbirolli
- 1989: Jack Brymer
- 1990: Sidonie Goossens
- 1991: Eileen Croxford
- 1992: Elgar Howarth
- 1993: Nona Liddell
- 1994: Irvine Arditti
- 1995: Levon Chilingirian
- 1996: Amelia Freedman
- 1997: Yfrah Neaman
- 1998: David Takeno
- 1999: Richard Sotnick
- 2000: Christopher Rowland
- 2001: William Lyne
- 2002: Julian Bream
- 2003: John Woolf
- 2004: Sigmund Nissel
- 2005: Peter Cropper
- 2006: John Underwood
- 2007: Martin Lovett
- 2008: Joseph Horovitz
- 2009: Graham Johnson
- 2010: Stephen Dodgson
- 2011: Stephen Kovacevich
- 2012: Malcolm Singer
- 2013: Susan Tomes
- 2014: Richard Ireland
- 2015: Trevor Pinnock
- 2016: Steven Isserlis, CBE
- 2017: Kenneth Sillito
- 2018: William Bennett, OBE
- 2019: John Gilhooly, OBE
- 2020: Emma Johnson, MBE
- 2021: Corina Belcea
- 2022: Nicholas Daniel, OBE
- 2023: Lawrence Power
- 2024: Leon Bosch
