= Alfred J. Clements =

British concert promoter (1858–1938)

Alfred Joseph Clements (1858 – 6 January 1938) was the Organiser and secretary of the South Place Sunday Concerts in London for over 50 years, from 1887 to 1938. During that period, Clements arranged over 1,300 concerts featuring 1,500 artists.

== Career ==
The first concerts were held at the South Place Ethical Chapel, Finsbury in 1878, organised by the specially assembled People's Concert Society. But in 1887, the Society ran short of funds. Alfred Clements was appointed as first Honorary Secretary, with George Hutchinson as Assistant Secretary. Clements remained in his position for over 50 years, from 1887 until his death in 1938. Composer Richard Henry Walthew also had a long association with the Sunday Concerts, from the early 1900s until his death in 1951.

The thousandth concert was played on 20 February 1927. In 1929 the South Place Ethical Society had the Conway Hall in Red Lion Square purposely built for it, and the concert series has continued there ever since with the exception of the war years. The two-thousandth concert was held at the Queen Elizabeth Hall on 9 March 1969. They are still running every Sunday today.

In 1901, Alfred Clements was working as a printer and living with his wife Dora Mary Clements née Varian at 10 Leighton Crescent, Kentish Town, London. In 1926, he was awarded the Cobbett Gold Medal for services to Chamber Music.

When he died on 6 January 1938, he was living at 8 Finchley Way, Finchley London. Probate of his will was to his widow Dora, and his effects totalled £995 10s.

== Legacy ==
He is commemorated by a gold inlaid relief plaque at Conway Hall, London. Both Clements and his wife are named in the Book of Remembrance in the Musicians' Chapel at St Sepulchre-without-Newgate.

== Clements Memorial Prize ==
In 1938, a chamber music composition prize was established in his name. The initial prize was awarded to Frederick T Durrant for his Clarinet Quintet in E flat - subsequently performed at the Conway Hall in 1946 by Pauline Juler. The Quintet was revived by Peter Cigleris at Conway Hall in 2019.

Other prize winners have included:

- William Wordsworth, String Quartet No 1 (1941)
- Bernard Stevens, Piano Trio (1942)
- David Wynne, String Quartet No 1 (1944)
- David Gow, Clarinet Quintet (1945)
- Malcolm MacDonald, Trio in one movement (1946).
- Peter Racine Fricker, Wind Quintet (1947)
- Doreen Carwithen, String Quartet No 1 (1948, joint winner)
- Jean Coulthard, String Quartet No 1 (1948, joint winner)
- Iain Hamilton, String Quartet No 1 (1950)
- Hugo Cole, String Quartet in A (1951)
- Reginald Smith Brindle, Quintet (1953)
- Geoffrey Winters, String Quartet No 1, Op. 10 (1956)
- Sebastian Forbes, Piano Quintet (1963)
- Trevor Hold, String Quartet No 1 (1965)
- Justin Connolly (1967)
- Geoffrey Poole, Algol Of Perseus, piano trio (1973)
- Patric Standford, String Quartet No. 1: The Unreturning Spring (1975)
- Christopher Bochmann, String Quartet No 2 (1978)
- Richard Steinitz, String Quartet (1981, joint winner)
- Ian MacQueen, Wind Octet (1981, joint winner)
- Tom Ingoldsby, Sonata for violin, viola and piano (1994)
- Ian White, Undertones (in memoriam Tony Hancock) for tuba and string quartet (2000)

The prize was put into abeyance in the late 1970s, and revived occasionally after that, most recently in 2021 when the winner was Noah Max with his Sojourn piano trio.

== See also ==
- The Cobbett Competition
- Charles Lucas Medal
