= James Friskin =

Scottish pianist & composer (1886-1967)

- Born: 3 March 1886; Glasgow, Scotland
- Died: 16 March 1967 (aged 81); New York City, US
- Occupations: Classical music pianist, composer and teacher

James Friskin (3 March 1886 – 16 March 1967) was a Scottish-born pianist, composer and music teacher who relocated to the United States in 1914.

== Biography ==
Friskin studied in Glasgow with local organist Alfred Heap, and from 1900—at the precocious age of 14—at the Royal College of Music under Edward Dannreuther for piano and (from 1905) Charles Villiers Stanford for composition. He completed his Piano Quintet in 1907 at age 21; published by Stainer & Bell, Thomas Dunhill assessed it as "one of the most brilliant op.1's in existence". After completing his studies, from 1909 to 1914 Friskin taught at the Royal Normal College for the Blind. In 1914 he emigrated to the United States, where, at the invitation of Frank Damrosch, he became a founding teacher of the Institute of Musical Arts, forerunner of the Juilliard School of Music. He taught at Juilliard until his death. His students included the composer Dorothy Priesing.

While still at the Royal College, Friskin met composer and violist Rebecca Clarke (1886–1979). His 1912 Elegy for viola and piano may have been written out of his unrequited love for her. Friskin and Clarke, along with George Butterworth, formed a small choir to explore the works of Palestrina, asking Vaughan Williams to direct them. More than thirty years later, Friskin and Clarke, both aged 58, were married in New York City (on 23 September 1944) after a chance reunion.

In 1925, Friskin was the first pianist to perform J. S. Bach's Goldberg Variations in the United States; and in 1934 he performed both books of Bach's Well-Tempered Clavier in two New York recitals. He eventually recorded the Goldberg Variations in 1956, a year after Glenn Gould's celebrated recording. Friskin's obituarist in The New York Times wrote, "He became known as a Bach specialist long before others began specializing in baroque composers . . . He doesn't exaggerate or distort the music and plays Bach in a way that goes to the heart of the music. Friskin was not pedantic in his approach to Bach. Nor was he overly Romantic, an accusation that has been levelled at some of his more famous contemporaries."

Friskin's early promise as a composer was limited by his activities as a teacher and performer and he appears to have given up composing soon after his move to the United States. The early Piano Quintet was followed by a series of Phantasie chamber works written for the Cobbett chamber music competitions, including a piano trio, a string quartet and another piano quintet. The Piano Sonata, perhaps his last major work, dates from 1915. Friskin returned to London to perform it at the Wigmore Hall in November, 1920. There was also a handful of orchestral works, including a Piano Concerto which remained in manuscript and which has apparently been lost.

== Compositions ==
Friskin's compositions include:

- Ballade in C major for piano
- Cello Sonata in F major
- Concert Overture
- Elegy for viola (or clarinet) and piano (1912)
- Impromptu for cello and piano
- Nocturne in E flat for piano
- Phantasy for string quartet, winner of a Cobbett Prize in 1906
- Phantasy for piano trio in E minor
- Phantasy Quintet (for piano, 2 violins, viola and cello) (1910 or 1912)
- Piano Concerto
- Piano Quartet in G minor
- Piano Quintet in C minor, op 1 (1907)
- Romance for cello and piano
- Romance for violin and piano
- Scherzo for cello and piano
- Sonata for piano in A minor
- Suite in D minor
- Three Pieces for piano
- Three Sacred Motets for unaccompanied five-part chorus
- Violin Sonata in G major

== Publications ==
- Friskin, James (7 August 2014) [1921]. The Principles of Pianoforte Practice. Literary Licensing, LLC. ISBN 978-1498169189.
- Friskin, James; Freundlich, Irwin (17 February 2011) [1954]. Music for the Piano: A Handbook of Concert and Teaching Material from 1580 to 1952 (Revised ed.). Dover Publications. ISBN 978-0486229188.
