= Lionel Sainsbury =

English pianist and classical composer

Lionel Sainsbury (born 1 January 1958) is an English pianist and classical composer, noted for his stylistic combination of South American music, jazz blues and flamenco with the Western classical tradition.

== Biography ==
Born in Wiltshire in 1958, he started playing piano as a child, and soon started to compose his music. Later, he studied at the Guildhall School of Music and Drama in London, with Patric Standford (composition) and Edith Vogel (piano). In 1979 he received the British Mendelssohn Scholarship and met with Edmund Rubbra, John McCabe and Henri Dutilleux in Paris. He lives in Oxfordshire.

== Music ==
As an active pianist himself, a significant amount of his composition work is for solo piano. The Twelve Preludes were completed in 1987 and premiered by Jack Gibbons at St. John's, Smith Square in London. The Two Cuban Dances (1991) have also been arranged for other forces, including versions for violin and piano, piano duet, strings and wind quintet. Tasmin Little has used the second dance as an encore piece. The Dances were followed by the Cuban Fantasy, op. 22 (1994) and the South American Suite, op. 23 (1996). Sainsbury has issued three albums of his own performances: Lionel Sainsbury (1999, featuring the Twelve Preludes, Cuban Fantasy, Nocturne, Andalusian Fantasy and the South American Suite); Sunlight and Storms (2014); and Andalusian Fantasy (2015).

Sainsbury's orchestral work includes his Violin Concerto of 1989, which received a BBC studio performance in 1995 but was not premiered at a public concert until 2002: at the Three Choirs Festival in Worcester, with soloist Lorraine McAslan and the Bournemouth Symphony Orchestra, conducted by Adrian Lucas. It was later recorded by the same soloist with the BBC Concert Orchestra under Barry Wordsworth. A recording of the Cello Concerto (1999) followed in 2011 with soloist Raphael Wallfisch and the Royal Scottish National Orchestra conducted by Martin Yates. Malcolm MacDonald has described these two concertos as using "unabashedly tonal and opulent melodic language, recalling the neo-romantic idiom of great 20th century composers such as William Walton and Samuel Barber." Another orchestral work, Time of the Comet, was premiered in the Czech Republic by the Moravian Philharmonic under Petr Vronský in 2017.

== Selected works ==
Orchestral
- Allegro Risoluto, op. 10 for strings (1985)
- Violin Concerto, op. 14 (1989)
- Two Nocturnes for strings, op. 17 (1991)
- Time of the Comet, op. 25 symphonic poem (1997)
- Cello Concerto, op. 27 (1999)

Piano

- Fiesta, for two pianos, op. 1 (1978)
- Elegy In Memoriam Samuel Barber (1981)
- Twelve Preludes, op. 11 (1987)
- Andalusian Fantasy, op. 16 (1990)
- Nocturne, op. 18 (1991)
- Two Cuban Dances, op. 19 (1991)
- Cuban Fantasy, op. 22 (1994)
- South American Suite, op. 23 (1996)
- Sea Storm, op. 24 (1997)
- Incantation, op. 26 (1998)
- Meditation, op. 28 (2000)
- Canto Ostinato, op. 30 (2001)
- Ten Moments Musicaux, op. 31 (2003)
- Five Tangos, op. 34 (2010)
- Prelude on the name of Ravel, op. 38 (2020)

Chamber and instrumental

- Caprice for solo flute, op. 4
- Violin Sonata, op. 5
- Prelude, Blues and Postlude for clarinet & piano, op.9 (1984)
- Soliloquy for solo violin op. 21 (1993)
- Mirage for violin & piano, op. 29 (2000)
- Five Fantasias for guitar, op. 32 (2007)
- String Quartet in F sharp minor op. 36 (2018)
- Sonata for solo cello, op. 37 (2020)
- Duo Sonata for violin & cello, op.39 (2022)
