= Malcolm MacDonald (composer) =

British composer, academic and critic

Malcolm MacDonald (1916–1992) was a British composer, academic and critic. He was educated at Harrow, and then at Trinity College, Cambridge. During the war he was a Bandmaster, RAF Coastal Command (1942–44), and then with the Flying Training Command (1944–45). After the war (from 1948) he moved to South Africa as a senior lecturer in music at Cape Town University. Returning to the UK he was a professor of harmony and counterpoint at the Royal Academy of Music from 1954 (where Judith Bingham was one of his students from 1970 to 1973 and Craig Armstrong from 1977 until 1981), a lecturer at the Royal Academy of Dancing (1962–67), and an examiner with the Associated Board from 1965. He was an expert on wind instruments and a jazz enthusiast.

MacDonald won the Clements Memorial Prize in 1946 for his Trio in One Movement, which was heard again at a Society for the Promotion of New Music concert on 6 December 1949. His Symphony No 2 won the Royal Philharmonic Society's Open Prize Competition in 1952. His best-known work (and the only one recorded and still performed in recent times) is the short light music piece Cuban Rondo for clarinet and orchestra, written in 1960. Other works included a Sinfonietta (1951), and multiple concertos, for harpsichord, violin, viola, clarinet, bassoon and horn. There are also some solo piano miniatures, such as Entry of the Zanies, Mazwan Wedding and On the Avenue.

MacDonald was a regular contributor to The Gramophone magazine, and from the late 1940s a frequent music reviewer and presenter on BBC radio. Because of these activities he has often been confused with the later music critic Malcolm MacDonald (1948–2014).

He married Margaret Kerslake, a violinist who studied at the Royal College of Music from 1936. Their address in the 1960s was Howard House, Crown Street, Harrow-on-the Hill.
