= Yfrah Neaman =

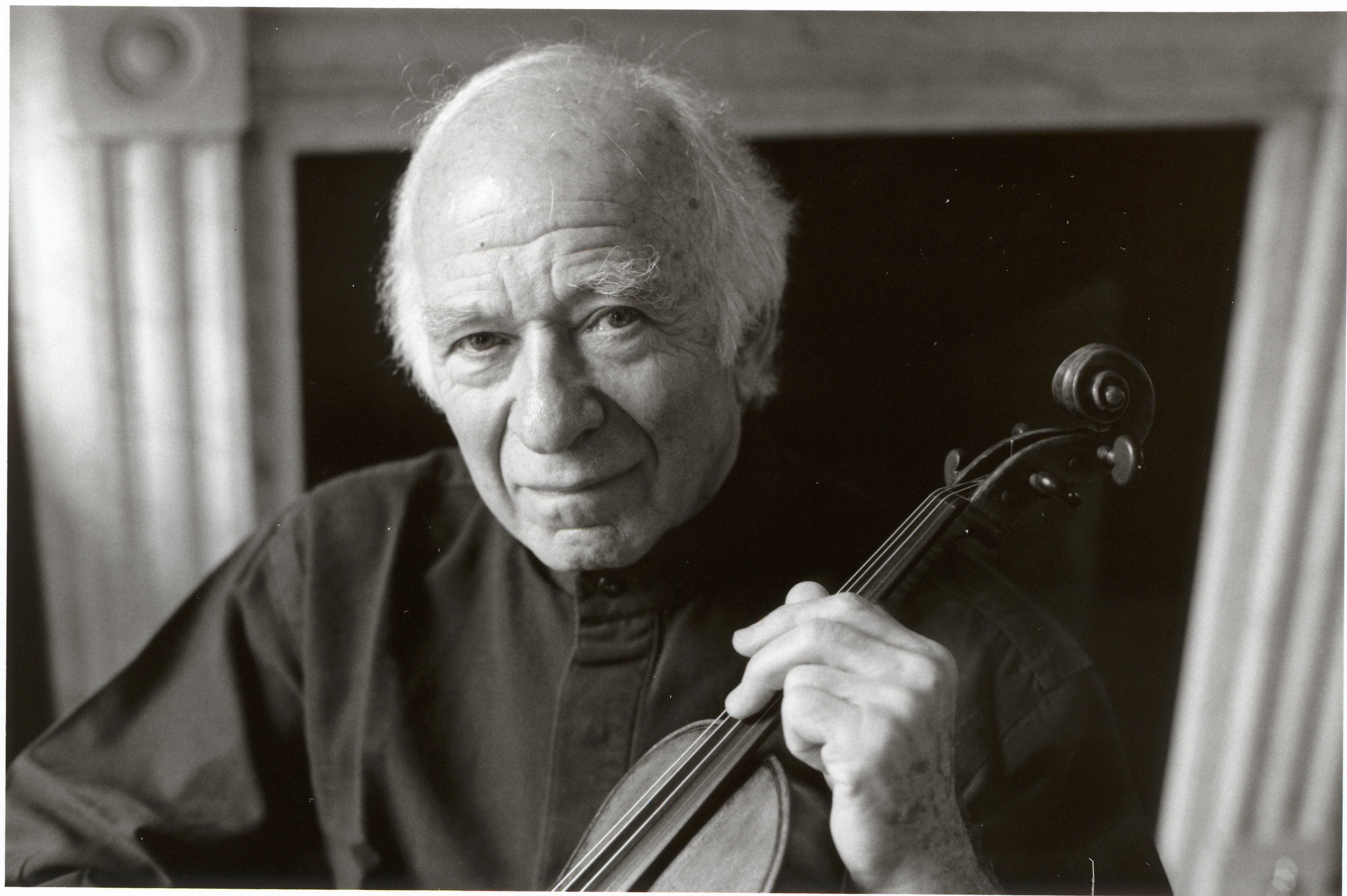
Yfrah Neaman

Professor Yfrah Neaman, OBE FGSM (13 February 1923 – 4 January 2003), was a violinist and teacher.

== Early life ==
Neaman was born in Sidon, Lebanon. He lived in Tel Aviv until 1932 when he moved to Paris to study at the Paris Conservatoire. In 1937 at the age of 14 he won the Premier Prix, the youngest ever student to do so. After his studies in Paris, Neaman travelled to London to study with Carl Flesch, and in 1939 returned to France to study with Jacques Thibaud. Following the German invasion of France in 1940, Neaman settled in London where he continued his studies with Max Rostal.

== Career ==
James Agate's review of Neaman's London debut, 1944

Once settled in London Neaman met Dame Myra Hess and Howard Ferguson, both of whom became life-long friends. They invited him to play for their National Gallery lunchtime concert series and during the next few years Neaman gave 15 National Gallery concerts.

Neaman taught at the Guildhall School of Music and Drama from 1958 until his death, first as Professor of Violin, then as Head of Advanced Solo Studies. His students included Simon Fischer. In 1998 he was made Emeritus Professor in recognition of his 40 years' service to the School. He gave masterclasses all over the world and as a guest professor had his own class four times a year at the Peter Cornelius Konservatorium in Mainz, Germany, from 1973 until his death. He was also Specialist Consultant to Wells Cathedral Music School for over 30 years. He held the Hengrave Summer Course for more than 25 years.

== Awards ==
Neaman received many international and UK awards, including the Gutenberg-Plakette of the City of Mainz, Germany, in 1997, the Cobbet Medal of the Worshipful Company of Musicians in 1997, and the Freedom of the City of London in 1980. He was appointed an Officer of the Order of the British Empire (OBE) in 1983.

== Death ==
Yfrah Neaman died of cancer on January 4, 2003, at age 79 in London, survived by his wife Gillian, son Sam and daughter Rachel.

== See also ==
- List of British Jews
