= Beth Wiseman (composer) =

British composer

Beth Wiseman (1951–2007) was a British composer, specializing in multimedia.

== Biography ==
She studied composition with Alexander Goehr and was strongly influenced by her study of the Australian composer David Lumsdaine. She also taught in several British Universities and schools. Early on, she was drawn to composition with text and other external stimuli such as paintings, photography, dance and theatre, often using mixed media such as live performers alongside taped sounds and live electronics, as well as extra-musical elements. She had three children and was the wife of composer Geoffrey Poole.

== List of compositions ==
- Two Songs from the Japanese, for mezzo, clarinet, viola, piano and percussion,
- Poe, ballet score – tape composition,
- Incidental music for: I, Claudius - small ensemble
- Blood Wedding – small ensemble,
- The Fire-raisers – tape,
- Out of the Long Night, Multi-media piece for reciter, tape, live instruments and projection, based on Aboriginal creation myths/oral poetry.
- The Man Whose Mother Was a Pirate – Music-drama for children – narrator and-small ensemble
- Blow of Thy Breath, Two poems of Indian mystical poets – soprano and recorder.
- Ad Marginem for Large Chamber Ensemble – inspired by the Klee painting of the same name.
- Myriad, for Oboe, Harp and dancers, centred on the eponymous sculpture by Katharine Dowson, commissioned by Okeanos for performance in the Whitworth Art Gallery Sculpture Court.
