= Worshipful Company of Musicians =

Livery company of the City of London

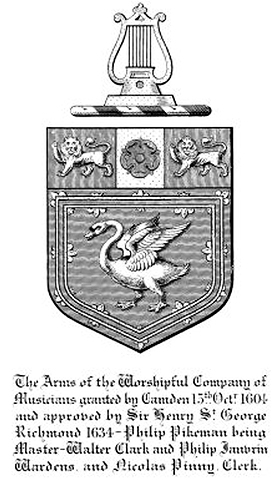
Arms of the company, 1905

The Worshipful Company of Musicians is one of the Livery Companies of the City of London. Its history dates back to at least 1350. Originally a specialist guild for musicians, its role became an anachronism in the 18th century, when the centre of music making in London moved from the city to the West End, and for more than a century it was a general guild for figures in the city, with no specific musical role. In the late 19th century, the musical element was revived, and the modern Company promotes all aspects of the art and science of music.

== History ==
The guild is believed to have been in existence at least as early as 1350, but the earliest official charter known was granted by King Edward IV to his minstrels in 1469. In 1500, the Fellowship of Minstrels was granted incorporation as the Musicians' Company by the Lord Mayor of the City of London, and the company was given the right to regulate all musicians within the city. In earlier centuries, minstrels had held an honourable position in mediaeval society, but by the 15th century they were less highly regarded, and the protection of a guild was much needed. The guild received a Royal Charter in 1604, transforming it into the Worshipful Company of Musicians, with the influence and prestige of other City livery companies. It was granted control over all music-making in and within three miles of London, except for Westminster and Southwark. Nevertheless, the musicians employed by the court and powerful aristocratic families resisted the new Company's authority, and in 1632 Charles I revoked the 1604 charter. In 1637 the Westminster Musicians Guild attempted to assert control of the city's musicians, and the Company fought hard to retain its privileges, operating without a charter from 1632 to 1950.

By the middle of the 18th century, most public music-making had moved from the city to the newly built West End of London, and the Worshipful Company had become an anachronism. To maintain its membership and existence, the company began admitting non-musicians, principally leading City businessmen, and, like many of the Livery Companies, it lost its original specialist identity. In 1870, with the election of the music publisher William Chappell, the company began to revive its interest in music. A modest number of musicians were admitted to membership, and the non-musicians in the Company agreed to an increasing emphasis on musical philanthropy as its primary activity.

Despite the lack of an official charter since 1632, the Company held tercentenary celebrations at the beginning of the twentieth century, under the direction of Colonel Thomas Bradney Shaw-Hellier commandant of the Royal Military School of Music. Masters of the Company who have been composers or otherwise connected with music include: Frederick Bridge, 1892; Herbert Sullivan, 1926; Hugh Allen, 1937; Herbert Howells, 1959; Jack Westrup, 1971; and Lennox Berkeley, 1976.

In 1949 the Company successfully petitioned the City authorities for permission to apply to King George VI for a new charter of incorporation. The new charter was granted in 1950.

== Present-day activities ==
The Company no longer has the power to regulate music within the city. It supports musicians and musical education, awarding prizes, scholarships and medals, among which are the Collard Fellowship, the Cobbett Prize for chamber music, the Santley medal for singers, the New Elizabethan Award (NEA) for guitarists, lutenists, and singers, and more than thirty other annual awards in honour of, among others, Harriet Cohen, Harry Mortimer, John Christie, and Priaulx Rainier. Its Yeomen Programme is a young artists’ scheme for musicians who have won one of its awards.

The company now has more than 390 liverymen and its affairs are managed by a Master, Senior Warden and Junior Warden, elected annually, and the Court of Assistants. The Company ranks fiftieth in the order of precedence for Livery Companies. Its motto is Preserve Harmony.

=== Awards ===
- Silver Medal - the Company's oldest award, inaugurated in 1889, originally as an annual award to the most distinguished student of (in turn) the Royal Academy of Music, the Royal College of Music and the Guildhall School of Music & Drama. Only one medal was awarded each year, with the student being selected in rotation from the three major Conservatoires. The first recipient was Stanley Hawley.
- Honorary Freedom (first presented de facto in 1876 and de jure in 1904).
- Gold Medal (awarded from 1903 as Special Presentations to the silver medal; since 2008 the award has been formally called the gold medal).
- Honorary Fellowship (awarded since 2004; recognising "performers, composers and others within the profession" but outside the company).
- The Prince's Prize (first presented in 2004; for "the most promising young instrumentalist or singer amongst the Company's Award winners")
- Popular Music Awards (founded in 2016).
- Walter Willson Cobbett Medal (founded in 1924; recognising services to chamber music).
- Sir Charles Santley Memorial Gift (founded in 1956; recognising vocalists, composers of vocal music or researchers into singing).
- Choral Director's Lifetime Achievement (founded in 2018 to "honour those choral directors who have made a significant contribution to choral singing in the United Kingdom".)
- John Henry Iles Medal (founded in 1947; "awarded annually in recognition of a significant contribution to the brass band movement").
- Harry Mortimer Medal (founded in 1995; "in recognition of services for the teaching of young people in the brass band movement").
- Jazz Young Musician Medal (founded in 1991).
- Jazz Lifetime Achievement Award (founded in 1991).
- Silver Swan (founded in 2004; recognising "senior Livery members who have given special service to the Company").

== Coat of arms ==
Coat of arms of Worshipful Company of Musicians
| Crest On a wreath of the colours, A lyre Or. Escutcheon Azure, a swan with wings expanded argent, within a double tressure fiory counterfiory Or; on a chief gules a pale between two lions passant guardant Or, thereon a rose gules barbed and seeded vert. Motto 'A Deo et caelo symphonia' or 'Harmony' |
