= Irwin Freundlich =

Prominent Juilliard teacher (1908–1977)

Irwin Freundlich (1908–1977) was a prominent teacher at Juilliard starting in 1935. He studied with James Friskin and Edward Steuermann at the Institute of Musical Art, which merged with the Juilliard Graduate School in 1926 to become the current Juilliard School of Music.

His wife, Lillian Freundlich (13 March 1912 – 1999) was a graduate of Juilliard and taught at the Peabody Conservatory of Music. The husband and wife team performed recitals together featuring pieces for one piano for 4 hands.

== Bibliography and external links ==
- Irwin and Lillian Freundlich collection at the International Piano Archives at Maryland (accessed 12 Jul 2013)
- James Friskin & Irwin Freundlich, Music for the Piano: A Handbook of Concert and Teaching Material from 1580 to 1952, Courier Dover Publications, 1973. ISBN 0-486-22918-1, ISBN 978-0-486-22918-8
- Sergey Prokofiev, Complete piano sonatas. Edited with annotations by Irwin Freundlich, Leeds Music, New York, 1957.
