= Tantivy Towers =

Opera by Thomas Dunhill

- Light opera by Thomas Frederick Dunhill
- Librettist: A. P. Herbert
- Premiere: January 16, 1931; Lyric Theatre, Hammersmith

Tantivy Towers is a three-act light opera with music composed by Thomas Frederick Dunhill, and libretto by A. P. Herbert. It premiered on 16 January 1931 at the Lyric Theatre, Hammersmith, the cast including Dennis Arundell, and later transferred to the New Theatre. The play ran for six months, later touring England and being staged in Australia and America. It was revived in 1935 with Maggie Teyte and Steuart Wilson in the leading roles. An abridgement and adaptation for radio was broadcast by the BBC on 14 November, 1940.

Some critics rated it among the best of the interwar period. The music was originally intended to be composed by Alfred Reynolds, who would later collaborate with Herbert on Derby Day, but Dunhill was chosen as the preferred composer after Reynolds had begun work.

It is set in the present day (the early 1930s), and plays on the contrasts and conflicts between urban bohemians and the rural aristocracy, between the artists and the hunting set, or – as one song describes it, "between Orpheus and Hercules". Dunhill, by then in his fifties but still living in London (at 27, Platt's Lane, Hampstead) was widely thought to have succeeded more with the music for the rural set than for the modern Chelsea artistic types, and was criticised for avoiding any hint of jazz in his Chelsea music.

The work is an example of a lyric opera (opéra lyrique) in that it consists of sung verse, with no prose speech; this contrasts with the opéra comique, which does contain spoken dialogue between the musical numbers; both genres include serious (or even tragic) works, and comedies. The overture has been arranged for orchestra by Philip Lane and recorded by the Royal Ballet Sinfonia, conductor Gavin Sutherland.
