= Patric Standford =

British composer (1939–2014)

Standford in 2011

Patric Standford (5 February 1939 – 23 April 2014) was an English composer, supporter of composers' rights, educationalist and author.

== Early life and education ==
Patric John Standford (real name John Gledhill) was born in Barnsley, moved to the West Riding of Yorkshire, and had a Quaker education at Ackworth School in West Yorkshire. He began his working life as a legal accountant and served in the Royal Air Force at 617 Squadron in Lincolnshire before arranging his own admission to the Guildhall School of Music and Drama in London in 1961, where he studied composition with Edmund Rubbra and Raymond Jones. While a student, he was awarded both the Carl Meyer Prize and the Royal Philharmonic Society Prize for composition.

== Career ==
In 1964, Standford was awarded the Mendelssohn Scholarship, enabling him to travel to Venice and study with Gian Francesco Malipiero, and later to Warsaw where he studied with Witold Lutosławski. In 1967 he joined the professorial staff of the Guildhall School of Music and Drama, and from then divided his working life between composing, conducting, teaching and musical journalism. When Edmund Rubbra retired, Standford was appointed the School's principal composition professor and was awarded a Fellowship of the Guildhall School of Music (FGSM) in 1972. In 1978, he gained a master's degree in composition at Goldsmiths College, London University.

Standford became chairman (1977–1980) of the Composers' Guild of Great Britain (since amalgamated into the British Academy of Songwriters, Composers and Authors (BASCA)) and chairman (1980–1992) of the British Music Information Centre (since amalgamated into Sound and Music). In those capacities, he organised British music representation at various international events, including the Nordic Music Committee (NOMUS) in Helsinki and the Latin-American Festival in Venezuela in collaboration with the BBC.

Standford held the post of Head of Music at the Leeds University College Bretton Hall from 1980 to 1993, while continuing to compose, write and appear as a regular jury member for competitive choral festivals in Hungary, France and Estonia.

He married his wife Sarah Blyth Hilton in 1967 and they lived in London. She died in 2011 after 44 years of marriage, and he moved to Occold, a village near Eye in Suffolk, where he continued to work, composing, writing and teaching until his death of a heart attack in April 2014, aged 75.

=== Composer ===
Standford's music covers many genres, predominantly the orchestra. His first symphony The Seasons, written in 1972, gained the Premio Città di Trieste award. His Symphony No. 2 was awarded the Óscar Esplá prize for composition in Spain. In 1983, Standford was awarded the Ernest Ansermet Prize of the City of Geneva for his Symphony No 3, a choral symphony subtitled Toward Paradise and setting Dante's journey from Purgatory to Heaven. The 5th Symphony was commissioned by the BBC Philharmonic Orchestra in 1984. Orchestral concertos include the Cello Concerto (1974), Violin Concerto (1975), Piano Concerto (1979) and the Concertino for Harpsichord and Small Orchestra (1999).

He wrote his Easter oratorio Christus Requiem for the Guildhall School of Music and Drama's principal Allen Percival and the City of London in 1973. Christus Requiem brought together the full orchestral, choral and dramatic forces of the Guildhall School for its first performance in St. Paul's Cathedral, in the Spring of that year. This oratorio received the Yugoslavian Government award in 1974. Other choral works include The Prayer of Saint Francis, the Mass for Hildegard of Bingen, recorded by the BBC Singers in 2013, and smaller scale pieces such as the carol This Day and the Stabat mater.

Chamber music includes the early String Quartet (winner of the Clements Memorial Prize in 1975), the Five French Folksongs written for and performed by the Nash Ensemble of London, and the Symphony No 4, Taikayoku, a chamber work for piano and six percussionists, including parts written for elementary players. The string trio Holiday Memories is also written for amateur players. Standford was commissioned to write a number of pieces for the Guildhall graded examinations (now Trinity College London).

He also composed commercial and light music and arranged for films, television and theatre - including assignments for Pathé News, the London Palladium and Granada Television. In 1971 he composed a 26 minute piece, Autumn Grass, for the classically-influenced progressive rock group Continuum, and ghost wrote and directed classical style pieces for Rod McKuen.

Standford continued to compose up until his death. Late works include the Recorder Quintet, commissioned by John Turner, recorded and premiered at the Rawsthorne Festival in 2014, and Anthem commissioned by Elis Pehkonen, premiered at the William Alwyn Festival 2014. He also revised Christus Requiem, with plans for performances at Norwich or Chichester Cathedrals.

Among his pupils were Barry Guy, Jerry Lanning, Lionel Sainsbury, de:Malcolm Dedman and Gary Higginson.

=== Writer ===
Standford contributed articles and reviews to Choir and Organ. From 1980 to 2008, he was music critic for the Yorkshire Post, writing features and revues. He also wrote a series of lively articles entitled Provocative Thoughts for Music & Vision Magazine and a monthly blog for the Open College of the Arts. In 1992, Standford published Projects: A Course in Musical Composition, and in 2008 he devised and wrote the composition study course for the Open College of the Arts.

== Awards ==
- 1972 Premio Cittá di Trieste for Symphony No 1
- 1974 Oscar Espla Prize for Symphony No 2
- 1976 Yugoslavian Solidarity Award, Skopje for Christus Requiem
- 1982 Evelyn Glennie Percussion Award for Taikyoku: Symphony No. 4
- 1985 City of Geneva 'Ernest Ansermet Prize' for Toward Paradise
- 1997 Budapest International Composers' Award for The Prayer of St Francis
- 1999 International ClarinetFest Prize for Fantasy Quintet

== Key works ==
Gitanjali: four Tagore Songs (1966)
String Quartet No 1: The Unrelenting Spring (1970)
Ballet: Celestial Fire (1971, orchestra)
Symphony No 1: The seasons (1972, orchestra)
Christus Requiem (1973), soli, chorus, orchestra)
String Quartet No 2 (1973)
Cello Concerto (1974)
Symphony No 2 (1974, orchestra)
Violin Concerto
Symphony No 3: Toward Paradise (1975–82, chorus, orchestra)
Taikyoku: Symphony No 4 (1976, 2 pianos and percussion)
A Christmas Carol Symphony (1978, orchestra)
Ancient Verses (1978, chorus and percussion)
Piano Concerto
Prelude to a Fantasy - The Naiades (1980)
Folksongs, Set 1 for string orchestra (1983)
Symphony No 5 (1984, BBC commission, orchestra, solo soprano)
Divertimento for violin and piano (1986)
Mass for Hildegard of Bingen (1988, SATB)
Six Piano Pieces: Faeries (1992)
The Prayer of Saint Francis: A Masque for chorus and orchestra (1996)
Concertino for harpsichord and small orchestra (1999)
The Emperor's Orchestra: a story for children (2001, narrator, orchestra)
Five French Folksongs for wind quintet (2004)
Six Preludes for guitar (2008)
Responses for Tenebrae: 18 motets for a cappella choir (2010)

=== Recordings ===
Symphony No 1; Cello Concerto; Prelude to a Fantasy – Naxos 8.571356
A Christmas Carol Symphony – Naxos 8.557099
Recorder Quintet – The Recorder Collection, Vol. 2 The Proud Recorder, John Turner/The Manchester Chamber Ensemble – Prima Facie PFCD038
The Prayer of Saint Francis – In Memoriam Zoltán Kodály, Winners of the First International Composers' Competition, Hungaroton CDBR 0156 (DDD)
Ballet Suite: Celestial Fire Best of British Light Music Resonance: CDRSB502 and Light Music Discoveries 3 CDWHL2128
Symphonies Nos. 4 and 5, Ancient Verses, Folksongs Set 1, A Christmas Carol Symphony. 'Patric Stanford', RTS MUSIC 1997, promotional CD (1997)
