= Cobbett Association =

Organization for music research

The Cobbett Association for Chamber Music Research was founded in 1980, with the objective of disseminating information about lesser known chamber music of merit. It was named after Walter Willson Cobbett, an amateur violinist and author/editor of Cobbett's Cyclopedic Survey of Chamber Music. During its existence, the Association published a periodical, The Chamber Music Journal, under the general editorship of R.H.R. Silvertrust, which was dedicated to presenting information about the chamber music of lesser known composers. The association was founded by Robert Maas, an amateur violinist and violist from Sarasota, Florida, who had retired from personnel work in the aerospace industry and played in an amateur string quartet called Palm Strings. He began by researching, playing and assessing rare chamber music, starting with string quartets, and distributed a modest newsletter about his discoveries. Maas died in February 1994 at the age of 75. The association was later led by Raymond Silvertrust, a cellist, who turned the informal bulletin into a quarterly publication. The association also maintained a copying library for its members, built on Maas’s collection of nearly 900 chamber works with more than 400 later additions, which was housed at the University of Western Ontario. The Association ceased operations in 2010.
