= David Gow (composer) =

English composer

David Godfrey Gow (6 April 1924 – 23 February 1993) was an English composer (of Scottish descent) and teacher.

== Life ==
Gow was born in London. His ancestors included the 18th Century Scottish fiddler Niel Gow and his son Nathaniel (a connection he acknowledged in his Six Diversions on an Ancestral Theme). He studied at the Royal College of Music with Gordon Jacob and Frank Merrick, where he gained his first recognition as a composer, winning the Clements Prize with his Clarinet Quintet (1945). He then took further composition lessons with Alan Bush and an M Mus degree at Durham University. He began regular composition in the 1950s, but later disowned many of his early works.

After a period teaching further education evening classes in London, Gow was appointed music lecturer at Swindon Technical College in 1962. He stayed on there until retirement. He also lectured at Bristol University, and from 1969 was closely involved with music courses for the Open University, and a regular at the University's Summer School music courses at Warwick and Cardiff.

Gow lived with his wife Margaret in Axford, Wiltshire, later moving to Aldbourne. He died in 1993 at the age of 68 after eight years of poor health, through which he continued to compose.

== Music ==
Gow described the style of his music as "serialism tempered by tonality", but he was always careful not to make unreasonable demands on performers. He composed nine string quartets (spanning the years 1946 to 1990) and from 1984 (starting at the String Quartet No 4) established a close association with the Maggini Quartet. His Quartet for flute, oboe, violoncello and harpsichord, Op. 28, won the Hans Oppenheimer Prize of the Saltire Society in 1967. He wrote many concertos, including the Piano Concerto for Philip Martin in 1980, the Cello Concerto for Timothy Hugh, and a Marimba Concerto for Evelyn Glennie, completed just before his death. His solo piano works include Twelve Preludes and a Postlude (1979) and two piano sonatas (1984 for Philip Martin and 1990 for Eric Parkin).

There are also songs and song cycles (such as Fifteen Faces of Love, 1982) and choral works such as Ave Maris Stella, which has been recorded. Gow worked closely with the BBC Northern Singers and their conductor Stephen Wilkinson, who gave the first performances and broadcasts of his cantatas The Wreck of the Deutschland (1971, setting Gerard Manley Hopkins), Little Cantata to the Stars (1974), Walden (1984), and Star Gazers (1990). Orchestral works include a nine minute long Mini Symphony written for the Hounslow Youth Orchestra in 1968, the Overture One-Two-Five (1978) commissioned by British Rail and used as the soundtrack for a short documentary film produced by British Transport Films, and the Symphony No 3 Wessex Heights, written in 1990 to commemorate 150 years since the birth of Thomas Hardy.
