= Edith Vogel =

- Born: 5 April 1912; Czernowitz, Austro-Hungarian Empire
- Died: 12 June 1992 (aged 80) London, United Kingdom
- Genres: Baroque, Classical, Romantic 20th century
- Occupations: Pianist, classical musician
- Instrument: Piano

Edith Vogel (5 April 1912 in Czernowitz – 12 June 1992 in London) was an Austro-Hungarian-born classical pianist active in the UK.

After she got as far as she could with her first teacher, Vogel took lessons from Wally Loew, first assistant to Richard Robert, whom she described as "a sergeant-major of the first order", who forced her to study only dramatic and virtuoso pieces. She made her debut in Vienna at the age of 10, and studied at the Vienna Academy. She broadcast on Austrian radio when she was 15.

After Hitler came to power she escaped Austria, arriving at Victoria station in 1938 with ten schillings. From her arrival in Britain she did not play professionally for ten years, working instead as house-keeper, clerk, child-minder and some 'unofficial' teaching, and playing only privately among friends and fellow refugees (including on one occasion Schnabel before he left for America). At one point she was almost mistakenly engaged at the Windmill Theatre. From August 1948 she began playing recitals and concertos up and down the UK. She appeared at the Proms seven times between 1952 and 1978, playing Brahms and Beethoven, but also the London premiere of Gordon Jacob's 2nd Piano Concerto.

Vogel began to broadcast regularly for BBC radio from the 1950s, becoming particularly associated with the music of Beethoven and Schubert. She was also a prominent teacher, participating in the Dartington Summer Schools and joining the piano faculty and giving master classes at the Guildhall School of Music, claiming that life without teaching would be "unthinkable". A colleague there was James Gibb, with whom she performed duets. She had homes in London and Sussex.

The BBC holds a considerable archive of her recordings, some of which have been made commercially available.
