= Simon Fischer (musician) =

- Birth name: Simon Fischer
- Born: September 1956 (age 68–69) Sydney, Australia
- Origin: Australia
- Genres: Classical
- Occupation(s): Pedagogue, Violinist, Writer, Artist, Soloist
- Instrument(s): Violin, Viola
- Years active: present
- Labels: Biddulph Recordings, Edition Peters
- Website: www.simonfischeronline.com

Simon Fischer (born September, 1956) is a contemporary violinist and pedagogue. Born in Sydney, Australia, son of Raymond Fischer whom he has been accompanied by in some of his recitals.

Started to learn at age of 7, then at age of 11 he studied shortly at the Junior Guildhall with Christopher Polyblank and Clive Lander At age 13 he studied privately first with Homi Kanger, then with Eli Goren, then Perry Hart, then Sydney Fixman. Then at the Senior Guildhall by Yfrah Neaman and as a postgraduate in New York with Dorothy DeLay, first through Sarah Lawrence College and then through the Juilliard School. After finishing formal studies he had lessons from Zakhar Bron, Herman Krebbers, Igor Ozim, Frederick Grinke, Sándor Végh, Emanuel Hurwitz, Bela Dekany and Erich Gruenberg.

== Teaching ==
He is currently professor at the Guildhall School of Music & Drama, giving regular masterclasses at the Royal Conservatoire of Scotland and former professor at The Yehudi Menuhin School.
