= Philip Lane (composer) =

English composer and musicologist

Philip Lane is an English composer and musicologist. He is noted for his light music compositions and arrangements, as well as his painstaking work reconstructing lost film scores.

== Biography ==
Born in Cheltenham, he attended Pate's Grammar School and later read music at Birmingham University, where his tutors included Peter Dickinson and John Joubert. Whilst at University he developed a considerable interest in Lord Berners, about whom he wrote a thesis and ultimately became a trustee of the Berners Estate, overseeing the completion of all Berners' music on to CD. He taught music at Cheltenham Ladies' College from 1975 to 1998. During this time, he was a freelance composer for London publishers. He left Cheltenham Ladies' College in 1998 to concentrate on composing and his film restorations. In November 2010, Lane received an honorary Doctorate of Music from the University of Gloucestershire.

== Compositions ==
Lane began composing at an early age, and by the time he was at Birmingham was already having compositions played by the BBC Midland Light Orchestra. Virtually all of his orchestral works have been commercially recorded and are currently available worldwide. These are often written in the style of British Light Music, being largely tonal and featuring lush orchestrations. For example, his London Salute was written to celebrate the sixtieth anniversary of the BBC, and has been adopted as the unofficial theme of the BBC Concert Orchestra. Cheltenham Ladies' College commissioned a work to celebrate the centenary of its music department. The result was A Spa Overture first performed in July 1982.

Other lighter compositions include the Diversions on a Theme of Paganini, Cotswold Folk Dances, Divertissement for clarinet, harp and strings, A Maritime Overture, Prestbury Park, Three Spanish Dances and a number of works themed around the Christmas season - the three Wassail Dances (three orchestral extemporisations based on the Somerset Wassail, Yorkshire Wassail and the Gloucestershire Wassail), Overture on French Carols and Three Christmas Pictures (the latter a compilation of individual original works; the "Sleighbell Serenade", "Starlight Lullaby" and the "Christmas Eve Waltz"). In December 2009 he was commissioned by the Boston Pops Orchestra to write their annual Holiday Pops work, The Christmas Story, which received 38 performances.

In addition, in 2007 Lane composed a setting of The Night before Christmas for narrator and orchestra, the commercial recording of which featured Stephen Fry as the narrator. Concert performances have taken place worldwide including the US and Asia. The sequel - Another Night before Christmas to a text by Poet Laureate, Carol Ann Duffy - was premiered in Liverpool in December 2009 with narrators Dame Joan Bakewell and Simon Bates. This was commercially released by Naxos in November 2011 with Simon Callow as narrator.

Lane's compositions for television have included BBC drama including The Merchant of Venice and Sir Thomas More and the children's animated series Captain Pugwash. He has since composed the music for three other TV animation series - Tom, Marco and Gina and Wicked!. In 2005, he composed a ballet, Hansel and Gretel, for the National Youth Ballet.

== Film score reconstruction ==
After being invited to look after the estate of Richard Addinsell in 1993, Lane began a new career reconstructing lost film scores of Addinsell's, the first being Goodbye, Mr Chips, and later the full Warsaw Concerto amongst others, the originals of which had been destroyed by the studios as was common practice at the time. Lane has since performed similar rescue work on film scores such as The Quiet Man, The 39 Steps, The Lady Vanishes and Kind Hearts and Coronets by composers such as Malcolm Arnold, Georges Auric, William Alwyn, Arthur Bliss, Francis Chagrin, Ernest Irving, Clifton Parker, Victor Young and many others.

Having perfect pitch, Lane reconstructs the original orchestrations by watching the original films repeatedly, listening to the original soundtrack recorded, often under character dialogue and sound effects. In the case of recent scores there are usually soundtrack CDs devoid of extraneous sounds to work from, but despite the change in status of film music, present day composers still mislay their scores. He has consequently been requested to reconstruct music by Jerry Goldsmith, Randy Edelman and James Horner. If the composers are still alive, Lane usually encourages them to do the reconstruction themselves, although so far, several have declined. He has since been asked to appear and write a number of radio documentaries about his reconstructions of film music.
