= Goldberg Ensemble =

UK string ensemble

The Goldberg Ensemble is a string ensemble formed in 1982 in Manchester, UK. The group also performs as a chamber orchestra, a festival opera company, a chamber ensemble, and a contemporary ensemble.

Since its formation, the group has toured internationally, performing in Europe, South America, China, Macau, and the Azores. The ensemble has appeared throughout the world on television and radio and has given concerts in many locations from the Palace of Holyroodhouse in Edinburgh to the Manaus Opera House in the Brazilian rainforest.

In recent years, the ensemble has performed annually at the Whitworth Coffee Concert series in Manchester and has toured nationally as part of their Contemporary series. The Ensemble has produced a number of recordings of both classical and contemporary works, initially under the Meridian label, and more recently with Naxos Records.

Artistic direction of the Goldberg Ensemble has recently been taken over by the violinist, David Adams.

The Goldberg Ensemble archive is held at the University of Huddersfield in the Archives and Special Collections.
