= 33rd Annual Grammy Awards =

1991 US music awards ceremony

- Date: February 20, 1991
- Location: Radio City Music Hall, New York City
- Hosted by: Garry Shandling
- Most awards: Quincy Jones (6)
- Most nominations: Phil Collins (9)

Television/radio coverage
- Network: CBS

The 33rd Annual Grammy Awards were held on February 20, 1991. They recognized accomplishments by musicians from the previous year. Quincy Jones was the night's biggest winner, winning a total of six awards including Album of the Year.

== Performers ==
Artist(s)	Song(s)
Bette Midler	"From a Distance"
MC Hammer	"U Can't Touch This"
Mariah Carey	"Vision of Love"
En Vogue; Take 6	"Who's Loving You" "Something Within Me"
Tracy Chapman	"Imagine"
Aerosmith	"Come Together"
Phil Collins; David Crosby	"Another Day in Paradise"
Garth Brooks	"Friends in Low Places"
The Judds	"Love Can Build a Bridge"
Bob Dylan	"Masters of War"
Tony Bennett	"When Do the Bells Ring for Me?"
Harry Connick, Jr.	"We Are in Love"
Living Colour	"Time's Up"
Wilson Phillips	"Hold On"
Kathleen Battle	""In the Silence of the Secret Night" (from Six Songs Op. 4, no. 3 by Sergei Rachmaninoff)

== Presenters ==
- Sting & Gloria Estefan – Best Pop Vocal Performance Male
- Young MC & Bobby Brown – Best Rap Solo Performance
- Regina Belle & Michael Bolton – Best R&B Vocal Performance Male
- En Vogue & Take 6 – Best New Artist
- Richard Gere – Presents Lifetime Achievement Award to John Lennon. Yoko Ono accepts the award on his behalf.
- Bonnie Raitt & Don Henley – Album of the Year
- James Ingram & Natalie Cole – Song of the Year
- The Judds – Best Country Vocal Performance Male
- Randy Travis & Vince Gill – Best Country Performance by Duo or Group
- The Kentucky Headhunters & Lisa Stansfield – Best Rock Vocal Performance Male
- Maria Conchita Alonso & Edward James Olmos – Best Tropical Latin Performance
- Bernadette Peters & Tommy Tune – Best Musical Cast Show Album
- Vanilla Ice & Debbie Gibson – Best Pop Vocal Performance Female
- Jack Nicholson – Presents Lifetime Achievement Award to Bob Dylan
- Stanley Jordan & Quincy Jones – Best Jazz Vocal Performance Male
- Cyndi Lauper & The B-52s – Best Hard Rock Performance and Best Rock Performance by Duo or Group
- Quincy Jones – Presents the President of the Recording Academy
- Graham Nash & Johnny Gill – Best Pop Vocal Performance by a Duo or Group
- Diana Ross & Jon Bon Jovi – Record of the Year

== Award winners ==
=== General ===
Record of the Year

- "Another Day in Paradise" – Phil Collins
  - Hugh Padgham & Phil Collins, producers
- "Vision of Love" – Mariah Carey
  - Rhett Lawrence & Narada Michael Walden, producers
- "U Can't Touch This" – MC Hammer
  - MC Hammer, producer
- "From a Distance" – Bette Midler
  - Arif Mardin, producer
- "Nothing Compares 2 U" – Sinéad O'Connor
  - Sinéad O'Connor & Nellee Hooper, producers

Album of the Year

- Back on the Block – Quincy Jones
  - Quincy Jones, producer
- ...But Seriously – Phil Collins
  - Phil Collins & Hugh Padgham, producers
- Mariah Carey – Mariah Carey
  - Mariah Carey, Rhett Lawrence, Ric Wake, Narada Michael Walden, Ben Margulies & Walter Afanasieff, producers
- Please Hammer Don't Hurt 'Em – MC Hammer
  - Felton Pilate & James Earley, producers
- Wilson Phillips – Wilson Phillips
  - Glen Ballard, producer

Song of the Year

- "From a Distance"
  - Julie Gold, songwriter (Bette Midler)
- "Vision of Love"
  - Mariah Carey & Ben Margulies, songwriters (Mariah Carey)
- "Another Day in Paradise"
  - Phil Collins, songwriter (Phil Collins)
- "Nothing Compares 2 U"
  - Prince, songwriter (Sinéad O'Connor)
- "Hold On"
  - Chynna Phillips, Glen Ballard & Carnie Wilson, songwriters (Wilson Phillips)

Best New Artist

- Mariah Carey
- Lisa Stansfield
- The Black Crowes
- The Kentucky Headhunters
- Wilson Phillips

=== Alternative ===
Best Alternative Music Album

- I Do Not Want What I Haven't Got – Sinéad O'Connor
- Strange Angels – Laurie Anderson
- The Sensual World – Kate Bush
- All Shook Down – The Replacements
- Goodbye Jumbo – World Party

=== Blues ===
Best Traditional Blues Recording

- Live at San Quentin – B. B. King
- Standing My Ground – Clarence "Gatemouth" Brown
- "T'aint Nobody's Bizness If I Do" – Ruth Brown & Linda Hopkins
- "Coming to Town" – John Lee Hooker, Earl Palmer, Tim Drummond, Miles Davis & Roy Rogers
- Too Much Pain – Little Milton

Best Contemporary Blues Recording

- Family Style – Jimmie Vaughan & Stevie Ray Vaughan
- Midnight Stroll – The Robert Cray Band featuring The Memphis Horns
- Jump for Joy – Koko Taylor
- "Red Hot & Blue" – B.B. King and Lee Atwater
- Stickin' to My Guns – Etta James

=== Children's ===
Best Recording for Children

- The Little Mermaid – Alan Menken (composer) & Howard Ashman (lyricist)
- Doc Watson Sings Songs for Little Pickers – Doc Watson
- How the Leopard Got His Spots – Danny Glover & Ladysmith Black Mambazo
- The Little Mermaid: Read Along – Roy Dotrice
- The Rock-A-Bye Collection, Volume 2 – Tanya Goodman

=== Classical ===
Best Orchestral Performance

- Shostakovich: Symphonies Nos. 1 & 7
  - Leonard Bernstein, conductor & the Chicago Symphony Orchestra
- Beethoven: Symphonies Nos. 7 in A & 8 in F
  - Georg Solti, conductor & the Chicago Symphony Orchestra
- Hanson: Symphonies Nos. 3 & 6
  - Gerard Schwarz, conductor & the Seattle Symphony Orchestra
- Ives: Symphony No. 2; The Gong on the Hook and Ladder; Central Park in the Dark; The Unanswered Question
  - Leonard Bernstein, conductor & the New York Philharmonic
- Shostakovich: Symphony No. 8, Op. 65
  - Leonard Slatkin, conductor & the St. Louis Symphony Orchestra

Best Classical Vocal Performance

- Carreras, Domingo, Pavarotti in Concert
  - Zubin Mehta, conductor, José Carreras, Plácido Domingo, Luciano Pavarotti, & the Orchestra Del Maggio Musicale
- Schubert: The Complete Songs, Vol. 7
  - Elly Ameling
- Berlioz: Les Nuits d Ete, Op. 7; Mahler: 5 Wunderhorn Songs and 5 Ruckert Songs
  - Jan DeGaetani
- Songs from Des Knaben Wunderhorn (Mahler, Brahms, Schumann, Loewe, Strauss, Zemlinsky, von Weber)
  - Thomas Hampson
- Adams: The Wound-Dresser
  - Sanford Sylvan

Best Opera Recording

- Wagner: Das Rheingold
  - James Levine (conductor), Siegfried Jerusalem, Christa Ludwig, Kurt Moll, James Morris, Jan Hendrik Rootering, Ekkehard Wlaschiha, Heinz Zednik; Cord Garben, producer (Metropolitan Opera Orchestra)
- Weill: The Threepenny Opera
  - Mario Adorf, Helga Dernesch, René Kollo, Ute Lemper, John Mauceri & Milua; Michael Haas, producer (Berlin Sinfonietta)
- Verdi: Attila
  - Ernesto Gavazzi, Riccardo Muti, Samuel Ramey, Neil Shicoff, Cheryl Studer, Giorgio Surian & Giorgio Zancanaro; David Groves, producer (Milano Teatro Alla Scala Chorus; Milano Teatro Alla Scala Orchestra)
- Prokofiev: The Love for Three Oranges
  - Gabriel Bacquier, Jules Bastin, Catherine Dubosc, Georges Gautier, Kent Nagano & Jean-Luc Viala; Arend Prohmann, producer (Lyon Opera Chorus; Orchestra De Lyon)
- Mussorgsky: Boris Godunov
  - Nicolai Gedda, Paul Plishka, Ruggero Raimondi, Kenneth Riegel, Mstislav Rostropovich, Romauld Tesarowicz & Galina Vichnievskaia; Michel Garcin, producer (National Symphony Orchestra)

Best Choral Performance (other than opera)

- Walton: Belshazzar's Feast/Bernstein: Chichester Psalms; Missa Brevis
  - Robert Shaw, conductor; the Atlanta Symphony Orchestra & Chorus
- Bach: St Matthew Passion
  - John Eliot Gardiner, conductor; London Oratory Choir & Monteverdi Choir; English Baroque Soloists
- Handel: Susanna
  - Nicholas McGegan, conductor; U. C. Berkeley Chamber Choir; Philharmonia Baroque Orchestra
- Vaughan Williams: Symphony No. 1 (Sea Symphony)
  - Bernard Haitink, conductor; London Philharmonic Choir; London Philharmonic
- Rachmaninoff: Vespers
  - Robert Shaw, conductor; Robert Shaw Festival Singers

Best Classical Performance, Instrumental Soloist (with orchestra)

- Shostakovich: Violin Concerto No. 1 in A Minor/ Glazunov: Violin Concerto in A Minor
  - Itzhak Perlman, soloist; Israel Philharmonic Orchestra; Zubin Mehta, conductor
- Hanson: Fantasy Variations On A Theme of Youth
  - Gerard Schwarz, soloist; Carol Rosenberger, conductor
- Lazarof: Tableaux (After Kandinsky)
  - Garrick Ohlsson, soloist; Seattle Symphony Orchestra; Gerard Schwarz, conductor
- Stravinsky: Works for Piano and Orchestra
  - Paul Crossley, soloist; London Sinfonietta; Esa-Pekka Salonen, conductor
- Trumpet Concertos (Haydn, Hummel, Tartini, Torelli, and Bellini)
  - Rolf Smedvig, soloist; Scottish Chamber Orchestra; Jahja Ling, conductor

Best Classical Performance, Instrumental Soloist (without orchestra)

- The Last Recording – Vladimir Horowitz
- Carter: Night Fantasies; Adams: Phrygian Gates – Ursula Oppens
- Debussy: 12 Piano Études – Mitsuko Uchida
- Mozart: Piano Sonatas K. 283, 331, 332, 333 – Alicia de Larrocha
- Paganini: 24 Caprices for Solo Violin, Op. 1 – Midori

Best Chamber Music or Other Small Ensemble Performance

- Brahms: The Three Violin Sonatas
  - Daniel Barenboim & Itzhak Perlman
- Arensky: Piano Trio No. 2 in D Minor; Tchaikovsky: Piano Trio in A Minor
  - Mona Golabek, Andres Cardenes & Jeffrey Solow
- Bartók: Contrasts; Stravinsky: L'Histoire du Soldat-Suite; Ives: Largo, Songs
  - Richard Stoltzman, Richard Goode & Lucy Chapman Stoltzman
- Crumb: Black Angels; Tallis: Spem in Alium; Marta: Doom. A Sigh; Ives: They Are There!; Shostakovich: Quartet No. 8
  - Kronos Quartet
- Haydn: The Seven Last Words of Christ
  - Juilliard String Quartet, Benita Valente, Jan DeGaetani, Jon Humphrey, Thomas Paul

Best Contemporary Composition

- Bernstein: Arias & Barcarolles
  - Leonard Bernstein, composer
- Adams: The Wound-Dresser
  - John Adams, composer
- Lazarof: Tableaux (After Kandinsky) For Piano And Orchestra
  - Henri Lazarof, composer
- Riley: Salome Dances For Peace
  - Terry Riley, composer
- Zwilich: Symphony No. 2
  - Ellen Taaffe Zwilich, composer

Best Classical Album

- Ives: Symphony No. 2; The Gong on the Hook and Ladder; Central Park in the Dark; The Unanswered Question
  - Hans Weber, producer; Leonard Bernstein, conductor & the New York Philharmonic
- Adams: Fearful Symmetries; The Wound-Dresser
  - John Adams, conductor; Sanford Sylvan
- Carreras, Domingo, Pavarotti in Concert
  - Christopher Raeburn, producer; Zubin Mehta, conductor; José Carreras, Placido Domingo, Luciano Pavarotti
- Hanson: Symphonies Nos. 3 & 6; Fantasy Variations on a Theme of Youth
  - Adam Stern, producer; Gerard Schwarz, conductor; Carol Rosenberger
- The Last Recording
  - Thomas Frost, producer; Vladimir Horowitz
- Rachmaninoff: Vespers
  - Robert Woods, producer; Robert Shaw, conductor

=== Comedy ===
- Best Comedy Recording
  - Peter Schickele for P. D. Q. Bach: Oedipus Tex and Other Choral Calamities

=== Composing and arranging ===
- Best Instrumental Composition
  - Pat Metheny (composer) for "Change of Heart" performed by Roy Haynes, Dave Holland & Pat Metheny
- Best Song Written Specifically for a Motion Picture or Television
  - Alan Menken (composer) & Howard Ashman (lyricist) for "Under the Sea" performed by various artists
- Best Instrumental Composition Written for a Motion Picture or for Television
  - James Horner (composer) for Glory performed by James Horner & the Boys Choir of Harlem
- Best Arrangement on an Instrumental
  - Jerry Hey, Quincy Jones, Ian Prince & Rod Temperton (arrangers) for "Birdland" performed by Quincy Jones
- Best Instrumental Arrangement Accompanying Vocal(s)
  - Glen Ballard, Jerry Hey, Quincy Jones & Clif Magness (arrangers) for "The Places You Find Love" performed by Siedah Garrett & Chaka Khan

=== Country ===
- Best Country Vocal Performance, Female
  - Kathy Mattea for "Where've You Been"
- Best Country Vocal Performance, Male
  - Vince Gill for "When I Call Your Name"
- Best Country Performance by a Duo or Group with Vocal
  - The Kentucky Headhunters for Pickin' on Nashville
- Best Country Vocal Collaboration
  - Chet Atkins & Mark Knopfler for "Poor Boy Blues"
- Best Country Instrumental Performance
  - Chet Atkins & Mark Knopfler for "So Soft, Your Goodbye"
- Best Country Song
  - Don Henry & Jon Vezner (songwriters) for "Where've You Been" performed by Kathy Mattea
- Best Bluegrass Recording
  - Alison Krauss for I've Got That Old Feeling

=== Folk ===
- Best Traditional Folk Recording
  - Doc Watson for On Praying Ground
- Best Contemporary Folk Recording
  - Shawn Colvin for Steady On

=== Gospel ===
- Best Pop Gospel Album
  - Sandi Patti for Another Time... Another Place
- Best Rock/Contemporary Gospel Album
  - Petra for Beyond Belief
- Best Traditional Soul Gospel Album
  - Tramaine Hawkins for Tramaine Hawkins Live
- Best Contemporary Soul Gospel Album
  - Take 6 for So Much 2 Say
- Best Southern Gospel Album
  - Bruce Carroll for The Great Exchange
- Best Gospel Album by a Choir or Chorus
  - James Cleveland (choir director) for Having Church performed by the Southern California Community Choir

=== Historical ===
- Best Historical Album
  - Lawrence Cohn & Stephen Lavere (producers) for Robert Johnson - The Complete Recordings

=== Jazz ===
- Best Jazz Vocal Performance, Female
  - Ella Fitzgerald for All That Jazz
- Best Jazz Vocal Performance, Male
  - Harry Connick Jr. for We Are in Love
- Best Jazz Instrumental Performance, Soloist
  - Oscar Peterson for The Legendary Oscar Peterson Trio Live at the Blue Note
- Best Jazz Instrumental Performance, Group
  - The Oscar Peterson Trio for The Legendary Oscar Peterson Trio Live at the Blue Note
- Best Jazz Instrumental Performance, Big Band
  - Frank Foster for "Basie's Bag"
- Best Jazz Fusion Performance
  - Quincy Jones for "Birdland"

=== Latin ===
- Best Latin Pop Performance
  - Jose Feliciano for "¿Por Qué Te Tengo Que Olvidar?"
- Best Tropical Latin Performance
  - Tito Puente for "Lambada Timbales"
- Best Mexican-American Performance
  - The Texas Tornados for "Soy de San Luis"

=== Musical show ===
- Best Musical Cast Show Album
  - David Caddick (producer) & cast members with Gary Morris for Les Misérables – The Complete Symphonic Recording

=== Music video ===
- Best Music Video, Short Form
  - Sharon Oreck (video producer), Candice Reckinger (video director), Michael Patterson (video director) & Paula Abdul for "Opposites Attract"
- Best Music Video, Long Form
  - John Oetjen (video producer), Rupert Wainwright (video director) & M.C. Hammer for Please Hammer Don't Hurt 'Em: The Movie

=== New Age ===
- Best New Age Performance
  - Mark Isham for Mark Isham

=== Packaging and notes ===
- Best Album Package
  - Jeffrey Gold, Len Peltier & Suzanne Vega (art directors) for Days of Open Hand performed by Suzanne Vega
- Best Album Notes
  - Dan Morgenstern (notes writer) for Brownie - The Complete Emarcy Recordings of Clifford Brown performed by Clifford Brown

=== Polka ===
- Best Polka Recording
  - Jimmy Sturr for When It's Polka Time at Your House

=== Pop ===
- Best Pop Vocal Performance, Female
  - Mariah Carey for "Vision of Love"
  - Lisa Stansfield for "All Around the World"
  - Bette Midler for "From A Distance"
  - Whitney Houston for "I'm Your Baby Tonight"
  - Sinéad O'Connor for "Nothing Compares 2 U"
- Best Pop Vocal Performance, Male
  - Roy Orbison for "Oh Pretty Woman"
  - Phil Collins for "Another Day in Paradise"
  - Rod Stewart for "Downtown Train"
  - Michael Bolton for "Georgia on My Mind"
  - James Ingram for "I Don't Have the Heart"
  - Billy Joel for "Storm Front"
- Best Pop Performance by a Duo or Group with Vocal
  - Aaron Neville & Linda Ronstadt for "All My Life"
  - Bruce Hornsby and the Noise Makers for "Across the River"
  - Heart for "All I Wanna Do Is Making Love To You"
  - Wilson Phillips for "Hold On"
  - The B-52s for "Roam"
  - The Righteous Brothers for "Unchained Melody (1990 Re-Recording)"
- Best Pop Instrumental Performance
  - Angelo Badalamenti for "Twin Peaks Theme"
  - Kenny G for "Going Home"
  - Phil Collins for "Saturday Night And Sunday Morning"
  - Quincy Jones for "Setembro (Brazilian Wedding Song)"
  - Stanley Jordan for "What's Goin' On"

=== Production and engineering ===
- Best Engineered Recording, Non-Classical
  - Bruce Swedien (engineer) for Back On the Block performed by Quincy Jones
- Best Engineered Recording, Classical
  - Jack Renner (engineer), Robert Shaw (conductor) & the Robert Shaw Festival Singers for Sergei Rachmaninoff: Vespers
- Producer of the Year, (Non-Classical)
  - Quincy Jones
- Classical Producer of the Year
  - Adam Stern

=== R&B ===
- Best R&B Vocal Performance, Female
  - Anita Baker for Compositions
- Best R&B Vocal Performance, Male
  - Luther Vandross for "Here and Now"
- Best R&B Performance by a Duo or Group with Vocal
  - Ray Charles & Chaka Khan for "I'll Be Good to You"
- Best Rhythm & Blues Song
  - M.C. Hammer, Rick James & Alonzo Miller (songwriters) for "U Can't Touch This" performed by M.C. Hammer

=== Rap ===
- Best Rap Solo Performance
  - M.C. Hammer for "U Can't Touch This"
- Best Rap Performance by a Duo or Group
  - Big Daddy Kane, Ice-T, Kool Moe Dee, Melle Mel, Quincy D. III & Quincy Jones for "Back on the Block"

=== Reggae ===
- Best Reggae Recording
  - Bunny Wailer for Time Will Tell: A Tribute to Bob Marley

=== Rock ===
- Best Rock Vocal Performance, Female
  - Alannah Myles for "Black Velvet"
- Best Rock Vocal Performance, Male
  - Eric Clapton for "Bad Love"
- Best Rock Performance by a Duo or Group with Vocal
  - Aerosmith for "Janie's Got a Gun"
- Best Rock Instrumental Performance
  - Vaughan Brothers for "D/FW"
- Best Hard Rock Performance
  - Living Colour for Time's Up
- Best Metal Performance
  - Metallica for "Stone Cold Crazy"

=== Spoken ===
- Best Spoken Word or Non-musical Recording
  - George Burns for Gracie - A Love Story

== Special merit awards ==
- Bob Dylan was given a lifetime award presented by Jack Nicholson and sang "Masters of War" on the night of the first US invasion of Iraq.
- John Lennon was granted a posthumous lifetime achievement award, one year after his partner, Paul McCartney.
- The Chairman's Merit Award to Harry Everett Smith for the Anthology of American Folk Music

=== MusiCares Person of the Year ===
- David Crosby

== Reception ==
In a contemporary review, Variety described the telecast was "one of the most unmemorable in memory" and that "This year's telecast was doomed from the moment Sinead O'Connor, the artist behind the year's most compelling record, announced that she would boycott the show because the awards celebrate commercialism." The review critiqued the performers stating that Garth Brooks stage set up resembled a "Noël Coward play", Billy Idol changed a lyric of "Cradle of Love" to state "This song is so cheesy" and that MC Hammer appeared to be wrapped in aluminium foil.

The review spoke positively about performance of En Vogue and Take 6 and the a cappella performance by Tracy Chapman.
