= Fanfares (Goossens) =

List of patriotic fanfares commissioned by The Cincinnati Symphony in 1942

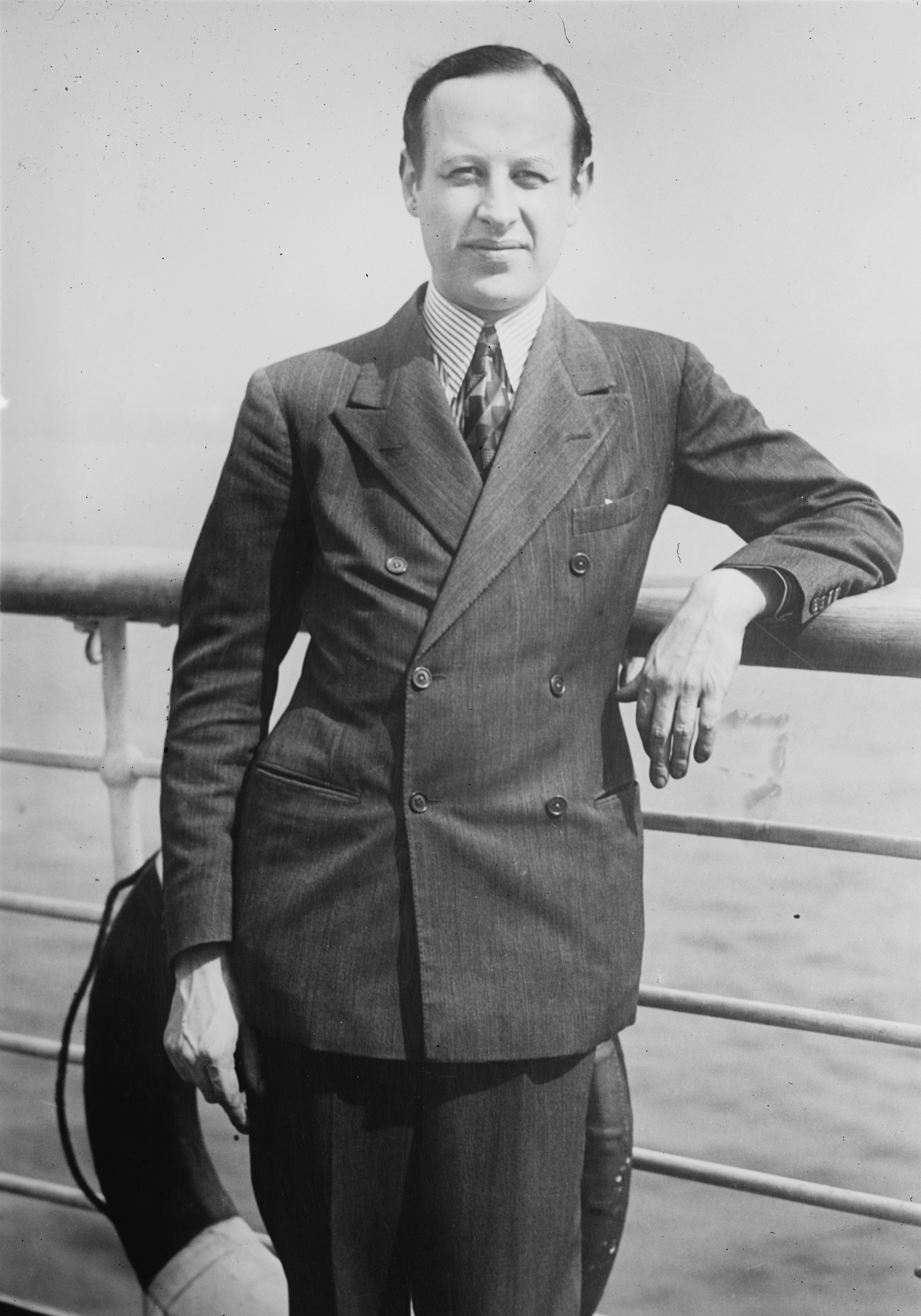
Eugene Goossens

In 1942, composer and conductor Eugene Goossens wrote to 23 composers, including Aaron Copland, to request patriotic fanfares as "stirring and significant contributions to the war effort ..." He suggested instrumentation of brass and percussion, and duration of around two minutes. Eighteen fanfares were eventually written, and performed during the 1942/43 season of the Cincinnati Symphony Orchestra. Aaron Copland responded to the request with his famous Fanfare for the Common Man, which was first performed on 12 March, 1943. National anthems from Allied countries were also performed to open the concerts.

- A Fanfare for Airmen, composed by Bernard Wagenaar, performed 9 October 1942
- A Fanfare for Russia, composed by Deems Taylor, performed 16 October 1942
- A Fanfare for the Fighting French, composed by Walter Piston, performed 23 October 1942
- A Fanfare to the Forces of our Latin-American Allies, composed by Henry Cowell, performed 30 October 1942
- A Fanfare for Friends, composed by Daniel Gregory Mason, performed 6 November 1942
- A Fanfare for Paratroopers, composed by Paul Creston, performed 27 November 1942
- Fanfare de la Liberté, composed by Darius Milhaud, performed 11 December 1942
- A Fanfare for American Heroes, composed by William Grant Still, performed 18 December 1942
- Fanfare for France, composed by Virgil Thomson, performed 15 January 1943
- Fanfare for Freedom, composed by Morton Gould, performed 22 January 1943
- Fanfare for Airmen, composed by Leo Sowerby, performed 29 January 1943
- Fanfare for Poland, composed by Harl McDonald, performed 5 February 1943
- Fanfare for Commandos, composed by Bernard Rogers, performed 20 February 1943
- Fanfare for the Medical Corps, composed by Anis Fuleihan, performed 26 February 1943
- Fanfare for the American Soldier, composed by Felix Borowski, performed 5 March 1943
- Fanfare for the Common Man, composed by Aaron Copland, performed 12 March 1943
- Fanfare for the Signal Corps, composed by Howard Hanson, performed 2 April 1943
- Fanfare for the Merchant Marine, composed by Eugene Goossens, performed 16 April 1943

12 of these fanfares have been recorded by the London Philharmonic Orchestra.
