= Les Misérables: The Complete Symphonic Recording =

Les Misérables – The Complete Symphonic Recording

Cast recording by various artists
- Released: 1988 (UK); 1990 (US)
- Recorded: August–October 1988
- Labels: First Night (UK); Relativity (US)

Les Misérables, subtitled The Complete Symphonic Recording, is an album containing a recording of the musical Les Misérables made by an international studio cast in August–October 1988.

== Recording ==
According the album's liner notes, it was recorded in August–October 1988 across three different studios in three countries: CTS Studios (London, England), Rhinoceros Studios (Sydney, Australia), and Studio Eleven Eleven (Nashville, Tennessee). and mixed in October of the same year at the Record Plant (Los Angeles, California).

The cast includes Gary Morris as Valjean, Philip Quast as Javert, Debbie Byrne as Fantine, Gay Soper as Madame Thénardier, Barry James as Monsieur Thénardier, Kaho Shimada as Éponine, Ross McCall as Gavroche, Michael Ball as Marius, Anthony Warlow as Enjolras, Martin Smith as Bamatabois, Tracy Shayne as Cosette, Ken Caswell as the Bishop of Digne, Kenny D'Aquila as Grantaire, and Marissa Dunlop as Young Cosette. The notes also state that "the 50 artists performing on [the] album were drawn from world-wide productions in London, New York, Sydney and Los Angeles" and are accompanied by "the Philharmonia Orchestra of London conducted by Martin Koch".

== Release ==
The album was originally released in the UK on First Night Records.

In 1990, Relativity Records issued it in the United States.

== Critical reception ==
Professional ratings
Review scores
Source	Rating
AllMusic	4.5/5 stars

Professional ratings
Highlights from the Complete Symphonic International Recording
Review scores
Source	Rating
AllMusic	4/5 stars

In a contemporary review for AllMusic, Sarah Erlewine writes: "The beautiful score is full of emotion and humor, including such memorable and noteworthy songs as 'Look Down', 'Do You Hear the People Sing?', 'Bring Him Home', 'Empty Chairs at Empty Tables', and the ubiquitous 'On My Own'."

== Chart performance ==
The album spent one week in January 1992 on the Billboard 200 Top Albums chart, at number 184.

== Track listing ==
=== 4 × LP box set (UK) ===
4 × LP – First Night MIZ 1 (UK)

Side 1
No.	Title	Length
1.	"Prologue"
2.	"Valjean's Soliloquy (What Have I Done?)"
3.	"At the End of the Day"
4.	"I Dreamed a Dream"

Side 2
No.	Title	Length
1.	"Lovely Ladies"
2.	"Fantine's Arrest"
3.	"The Runaway Cart"
4.	"Who Am I?" – "The Trial"
5.	"Fantine's Death"
6.	"The Confrontation"
7.	"Castle on a Cloud"

Side 3
No.	Title	Length
1.	"Master of the House"
2.	"The Bargain" – "The Waltz of Treachery"
3.	"Look Down"
4.	"The Robbery" – "Javert's Intervention (Another Brawl)"
5.	"Stars"

Side 4
No.	Title	Length
1.	"Eponine's Errand"
2.	"The ABC Cafe" – "Red and Black"
3.	"Do You Hear the People Sing?"
4.	"Rue Plumet" – "In My Life"
5.	"A Heart Full of Love"
6.	"The Attack on Rue Plumet"
7.	"One Day More!"

Side 5
No.	Title	Length
1.	"At the Barricade (Upon These Stones)"
2.	"On My Own"
3.	"Building the Barricade"
4.	"Javert's Arrival"
5.	"Little People"
6.	"A Little Fall of Rain"
7.	"Night of Anguish"
8.	"First Attack"

Side 6
No.	Title	Length
1.	"Drink with Me"
2.	"Bring Him Home"
3.	"Dawn of Anguish"
4.	"The Second Attack (Death of Gavroche)"
5.	"The Final Battle"

Side 7
No.	Title	Length
1.	"The Sewers" – "Dog Eats Dog"
2.	"Javert's Suicide"
3.	"Turning"

Side 8
No.	Title	Length
1.	"Empty Chairs at Empty Tables"
2.	"Every Day (Marius and Cosette)"
3.	"Valjean's Confession"
4.	"Wedding Chorale" – "Beggars at the Feast"
5.	"Epilogue (Finale)"

=== 3 x CD box set (UK) ===
3 x CD – First Night MIZ CD1 (UK)

CD 1
No.	Title	Length
1.	"Prologue"	10:06
2.	"Vaijiean's Soliloquy (What Have I Done?)"	3:22
3.	"At the End of the Day"	5:08
4.	"I Dreamed a Dream"	4:14
5.	"Lovely Ladies"	3:52
6.	"Fantine's Arrest"	4:24
7.	"The Runaway Cart"	3:38
8.	"Who Am I?" – "The Trial"	3:27
9.	"Fantine's Death"	3:44
10.	"The Confrontation"	2:26
11.	"Castle on a Cloud"	3:43
12.	"Master of the House"	6:42

CD 2
No.	Title	Length
1.	"The Bargain" - "The Waltz of Treachery"	6:14
2.	"Look Down"	3:16
3.	"The Robbery" – "Javert's Intervention (Another Brawl)"	4:33
4.	"Stars"	3:32
5.	"Eponine's Errand"	1:47
6.	"The ABC Cafe" – "Red and Black"	5:59
7.	"Do You Hear the People Sing?"	1:58
8.	"Rue Plumet" – "In My Life"	:46
9.	"A Heart Full of Love"	2:34
10.	"The Attack on Rue Plumet"	3:49
11.	"One Day More!"	3:29
12.	"At the Barricade (Upon These Stones)"	4:03
13.	"On My Own"	3:59
14.	"Building the Barricade"	2:36
15.	"Javert's Arrival"	0:54
16.	"Little People"	1:23
17.	"A Little Fall of Rain"	4:03
18.	"Night of Anguish"	2:17
19.	"First Attack"	3:39

CD 3
No.	Title	Length
1.	"Drink with Me"	2:49
2.	"Bring Him Home"	3:27
3.	"Dawn Of Anguish"	1:47
4.	"The Second Attack (Death of Gavroche)"	2:01
5.	"The Final Battle"	2:21
6.	"The Sewers" – "Dog Eats Dog"	6:28
7.	"Javert's Suicide"	4:29
8.	"Turning"	2:16
9.	"Empty Chairs at Empty Tables"	2:54
10.	"Every Day (Marius and Cosette)"	2:12
11.	"Valjean's Confession; Wedding Chorale" – "Beggars at the Feast"	2:59
12.	"Wedding Chorale"	3:58
13.	"Beggars at the Feast"	1:30
14.	"Epilogue (Finale)"	8:59

=== 3 x CD box set (US) ===
3 × CD – Relativity 1027 (US)

CD 1
No.	Title	Length
1.	"Prologue"
2.	"Valjean's Soliloquy (What Have I Done?)"
3.	"At the End of the Day"
4.	"I Dreamed a Dream"
5.	"Lovely Ladies"
6.	"Fantine's Arrest"
7.	"The Runaway Cart"
8.	"Who Am I?" – "The Trial"
9.	"Fantine's Death"
10.	"The Confrontation"
11.	"Castle on a Cloud"
12.	"Master of the House"

CD 2
No.	Title	Length
1.	"The Bargain – The Waltz of Treachery"
2.	"Look Down"
3.	"The Robbery" – "Javert's Intervention (Another Brawl)"
4.	"Stars"
5.	"Eponine's Errand"
6.	"The ABC Cafe" – "Red and Black"
7.	"Do You Hear the People Sing?"
8.	"Rue Plumet" – "In My Life"
9.	"A Heart Full of Love"
10.	"The Attack on Rue Plumet"
11.	"One Day More!"
12.	"At the Barricade (Upon These Stones)"
13.	"On My Own"
14.	"Building the Barricade"
15.	"Javert's Arrival"
16.	"Little People"
17.	"A Little Fall of Rain"
18.	"Night of Anguish"
19.	"First Attack"

CD 3
No.	Title	Length
1.	"Drink with Me"
2.	"Bring Him Home"
3.	"Dawn of Anguish"
4.	"The Second Attack (Death of Gavroche)"
5.	"The Final Battle"
6.	"The Sewers" – "Dog Eats Dog"
7.	"Javert's Suicide"
8.	"Turning"
9.	"Empty Chairs at Empty Tables"
10.	"Every Day (Marius and Cosette)"
11.	"Valjean's Confession"
12.	"Wedding Chorale" – "Beggars at the Feast"
13.	"Epilogue" (Finale)

== Charts ==
Chart (1992)	Peak position
US Billboard 200 Top Albums	184

== Certifications ==
Region	Certification	Certified units/sales
United States (RIAA)	Gold	500,000^{^}
^{^} Shipments figures based on certification alone.

=== Highlights version ===
Region	Certification	Certified units/sales
United States (RIAA)	Gold	500,000^{^}
^{^} Shipments figures based on certification alone.

== Awards ==
Year	Award type	Categories	Results	Ref.
1991	Grammy Awards	Best Musical Cast Show Album	Won	
