= Michael Bihovsky =

American composer and actor

Michael Bihovsky (born November 14, 1986) is an American musical theater composer, actor, singer, songwriter, director, comedian, playwright, and chronic illness advocate. He is best known for his musical parodies, especially" One Grain More" (2012), the award-winning Les Misérables food allergy parody, and "Trapped Inside the House" (2020), a "One Grain More" sequel about the COVID-19 quarantine.

Bihovsky's musical theater pieces center on his work as a chronic illness advocate. He has Ehlers–Danlos syndrome (Hypermobility Type), a connective tissue disorder. His semi-autobiographical musical, Fresh!, documents the early stages of his journey with EDS while attending New York University, and his musical-in-progress Senses applies the principles of neuroplasticity to tell the story of six characters living with chronic neurological and/or psychological conditions. Bihovsky's medical advocacy writing has been published in multiple publications, including the Stanford Medical Journal's SCOPE Project. In addition to his public writings and interviews about chronic illness, Bihovsky also leads support groups for people suffering from EDS and similar conditions.

As a playwright and advocate, Bihovsky is known for his integration of science and art, having graduated from NYU's Gallatin School of Individualized Study with a concentration in "Musical Theater Performance and Composition, Astrophysics and Mythology." He has described himself as particularly fascinated by the concept of infinity, and written a play, Without End, exploring the topic.

Bihovsky is also a voice and acting teacher in the Greater Philadelphia region, specializing in musical theater auditions for conservatories and productions.
