= Harmonic Materials of Modern Music =

1960 book by Howard Hanson

Harmonic Materials of Modern Music is a book on musical set theory by American composer Howard Hanson that overlaps significantly with composer Elliott Carter's Harmony Book and theorist Allen Forte's subsequent Structure of Atonal Music. Published in 1960, Hanson's theory was one of the first to examine all sets of pitches in terms of their specific interval content, independent of tonality, chord root, or consonance versus dissonance.
