= Ebony Concerto =

Ebony Concerto may refer to:

- Ebony Concerto (Taras) by John Taras, a ballet in the repertory of New York City Ballet
- Ebony Concerto (Woetzel) by Damian Woetzel, a ballet in the repertory of New York City Ballet
- Ebony Concerto (Stravinsky) by Igor Stravinsky
