= Mary McCarty Snow =

American composer

Mary Helen Snow McCarty (26 August 1928 - 14 October 2012) was an American composer, organist/pianist, and publisher who wrote The Waveform Music Book: Composing, Teaching, Performing Electronic Music with the ARP 2600 Synthesizer in 1977. She published most of her work under the names Mary Snow or Mary McCarty Snow.

== Life ==
Snow was born in Brownsville, Texas, to Carrie Beth Sewell and Harry Evans Snow. She married Darrell Keith McCarty in 1951. They had four children before divorcing in 1981. She and her husband formed the Lariken Press publishing company, which published her Waveform Music Book.

Snow earned a B.A. at Indiana University and a M.M. at the University of Illinois. Her teachers included Anis Fuleihan and Burrill Philips. She gave private piano lessons, taught at Texas Technological University, and served as an organist at several churches in Lubbock, Texas: the First Christian Church, First Covenant Presbyterian Church, Forrest Heights Methodist Church, and St. Christopher's Episcopal Church. She also established the Lubbock chapter of People Against Violent Crimes, and created a fundraiser for the organization called the “Bach-a-Thon.”

Snow received grants from the National Endowment for the Arts in 1977 and 1980, as well as a grant from Texas Technological University to compose a work based on desert land cultures. She composed electronic music for university theatre productions (listed below). Her works were published by the American Music Center, I. E. Clark, and Lariken Press.

Snow died in Wichita Falls, Texas, in 2012.

== Selected works ==
=== Band ===
- Toccata

=== Chamber ===
- Five Monodies (clarinet)

=== Dance ===
- Ezekiel I (actor, dancer, and tape)

=== Electronic ===
- Bacchae (text based on Euripides)
- Hieroglyphs (instruments and tape)
- Mandora (violin and tape)
- Obsidion II
- Voyages: Columbus/Apollo II

=== Theatre ===
- Dr. Faustus
- Indians
- MaratSade
- Peer Gynt
- Shining Princess of the Slender Bamboo
- The Tempest

=== Literature ===
- The Waveform Music Book: Composing, Teaching, Performing Electronic Music with the Arp 2600 Synthesizer
