= Burrill Phillips =

American classical composer

Leroy Burrill Phillips (November 9, 1907 – June 22, 1988) was an American composer, teacher, and pianist.

== Biography ==
Phillips was born in Omaha, Nebraska. He studied at the College of Music at the University of Denver with Edwin Stringham and at the Eastman School of Music in Rochester, New York, with Howard Hanson and Bernard Rogers. On September 17, 1928, he married Alberta Corinne Mayfield (1907–1979) who wrote many of his librettos. In 1931 the couple had a daughter who, under the stage name Ann Todd, became a child actress in films. She continued acting into her early twenties, but left the entertainment industry in 1954 and died in 2020. A second child, son Stephen, was born in 1937. He died in 1986, two years before his father.

Phillips's first important work was Selections from McGuffey's Reader, for orchestra, based on poems by Henry Wadsworth Longfellow and Oliver Wendell Holmes Sr. Immediately successful, the work established his reputation as a composer with a "consciously American style". By the 1940s he had turned to a more astringent and expressive idiom.

In 1960, his String Quartet No. 2 was premiered at the Library of Congress in Washington, D.C., by the Paganini Quartet, with the composer present, and broadcast on live FM radio. In the early 1960s he turned to free serial techniques, less sharply accented rhythms, and increasing fantasy.

Phillips taught composition and theory at Eastman School of Music (1933–49), the University of Illinois (1949–64), the Juilliard School of Music (1968–69), and Cornell University (1972–73). His students include Jack Beeson, William Flanagan, Kenneth Gaburo, Ben Johnston, H. Owen Reed, Daria Semegen, Mary McCarty Snow, Steven Stucky, David Ward-Steinman, and Charles Whittenberg, as well as Jerry Amaldev. He was a Fulbright Lecturer in Barcelona in 1960–61, and received Guggenheim fellowships in 1942–43 and 1961–62.

== Death ==
He died in Berkeley, California, in 1988, aged 80, of complications after a heart attack. His scores and sketches are housed in the Burrill Phillips archive, Special Collections, Sibley Music Library, Eastman School of Music, Rochester, New York.

== Selected works ==
His major works include:

- Selections from McGuffey's Reader, Suite for orchestra (1933)
- String quartets (No. 1, 1939–40; No. 2, 1958)
- Piano Concerto (1942)
- Don't We All?, Opera buffa (1947); text by Alberta Phillips
- Concert Piece for bassoon and string orchestra (or piano) (1942)
- Four piano sonatas (1942–60)
- Music for This Time of Year for wind quartet (1954)
- A Rondo of Rondeaux for viola and piano (1954)
- The Return of Odysseus for baritone, narrator, chorus and orchestra (1956); text by Alberta Phillips
- Conversations for violin and viola (1962)
- Perspectives in a Labyrinth for 3 string orchestras (1962)
- Dialogues for violin and viola (1963)
- The Unforgiven, opera in a prologue and 3 acts (1982); libretto by Alberta Phillips
- Various choral works, including That Time May Cease from Marlowe's Doctor Faustus (1967)
- Various works for solo voice and instruments, including Eve Learns a Little (1974)
