= David Ward-Steinman =

American classical composer (1936–2015)

David Ward-Steinman (November 6, 1936 – April 14, 2015) was an American composer and professor. He was the author of Toward a Comparative Structural Theory of the Arts, and co-authored Comparative Anthology of Musical Forms.

Ward-Steinman spent his remaining days dividing his time between San Diego State University and Indiana University in Bloomington. He was formerly Composer-in-Residence and Professor of Music at San Diego State, and then became Distinguished Professor of Music Emeritus there, and also an adjunct professor of Music at Indiana, where he taught in the spring.

== Biography ==
Ward-Steinman studied at Florida State University and the University of Illinois, where he received the Kinley Memorial Fellowship for foreign study. After receiving his doctorate, he was a fellow at Princeton University from 1970. His teachers included John Boda, Burrill Phillips, Darius Milhaud (at Aspen, Colorado), Milton Babbitt (at Tanglewood) and Nadia Boulanger. He studied piano under Edward Kilenyi, and in 1995 attended a course at IRCAM.

From 1970 to 1972, Ward-Steinman was the Ford Foundation composer-in-residence for the Tampa Bay area of Florida and he spent 1989–90 in Australia under a Fulbright Senior Scholar Award, with residencies at the Victorian Centre for the Arts and La Trobe University in Melbourne.

Ward-Steinman has received number of commissions, most notably from the Chicago Symphony Orchestra. His orchestral works have been performed by a number of ensembles, including the Japan Philharmonic Orchestra, New Orleans Philharmonic Orchestra, San Diego Symphony Orchestra, and the Seattle Symphony Orchestra. His music has been recorded on a number of labels, including Harmonia Mundi.

== See also ==
- Joseph H. Bearns Prize
