= Fanfare =

Relatively short piece of music that is typically played by brass instruments

"Fanfares of the President" by Bedřich Smetana

A fanfare (or fanfarade or flourish) is a short musical flourish which is typically played by trumpets (including fanfare trumpets), French horns or other brass instruments, often accompanied by percussion. It is a "brief improvised introduction to an instrumental performance". A fanfare has also been defined in The Golden Encyclopedia of Music as "a musical announcement played on brass instruments before the arrival of an important person", such as heralding the entrance of a monarch (the term honors music for such announcements does not have the specific connotations of instrument or style that fanfare does). Historically, fanfares were usually played by trumpet players, as the trumpet was associated with royalty. Bugles are also mentioned. The melody notes of fanfare are often based around the major triad, often using "heroic dotted rhythms".

By extension, the term may also designate a short, prominent passage for brass instruments in an orchestral composition. Fanfares are widely used in opera orchestral parts, notably in Richard Wagner's Tannhäuser and Lohengrin and Beethoven's Fidelio. In Fidelio, the dramatic use of the fanfare is heightened by having the trumpet player perform offstage, which creates a muted effect.

== Etymology ==
The word has been traced to a 15th-century Spanish root, fanfa ("vaunting"). Though the word may be onomatopoeic, it is also possible that it is derived from the Arabic word fanfáre ("trumpets"). The word is first found in 1546 in French, and in English in 1605, but it was not until the 19th century that it acquired its present meaning of a brief ceremonial flourish for brass. Indeed, an alternative term for the fanfare is "flourish", as in the ruffles and flourishes played by military bands in the US to announce the arrival of the president, a general, or other high-ranking dignitary. "In the England of Shakespeare's time", fanfares "were often known as flourishes and sometimes as 'tuckets' " (a word related to toccata).

== History ==
In French usage, fanfare also may refer to a hunting signal (given either on "starting" a stag, or after the kill when the hounds are given their share of the animal). In both France and Italy, fanfare was the name given in the 19th century to a military or civilian brass band. In French, this usage continues to the present, and distinguishes the all-brass band from bands of mixed brass and woodwind, which is called Harmonie. The same applies in Belgium and the Netherlands, where competitions for fanfares are held to this day, well separate from other wind ensembles such as brass bands and harmonies. Fanfares have been imitated in art music as early as the 14th century. Examples in opera include a fanfare for the governor's arrival in Beethoven's Fidelio, act 2. In the 20th century, well-known composed fanfares include Aaron Copland's Fanfare for the Common Man (1942), for brass and percussion, and Igor Stravinsky's Fanfare for a New Theatre (1964), for two trumpets.

Copland's Fanfare is one of a series of 18 commissioned by Cincinnati Symphony Orchestra conductor Eugene Goossens in 1942–43, each to open a concert. Each was to salute an aspect of the war effort; the U.S. had entered World War II the previous year. The only one of these fanfares to become well known is Copland's; the others are rarely if ever performed or recorded.

== Sources ==
=== Works cited ===
- "Goosens Fanfares". Cincinnati Symphony Orchestra (accessed July 30, 2018).
- Baines, Anthony, and Jane Bellingham. 2002. "Fanfare". The Oxford Companion to Music, edited by Alison Latham. Oxford and New York: Oxford University Press. ISBN 978-0-19-866212-9.
- Davidson, Thomas. 1907. "Fanfare". Chambers's Twentieth Century Dictionary of the English Language. London and Edinburgh: W. & R. Chambers, Limited.
- Griffiths, Paul. 2004. The Penguin Companion to Classical Music. London and New York: Penguin Books. ISBN 9780141909769 (electronic book).
- Kennedy, Michael. 2006. "Fanfare". The Oxford Dictionary of Music, second edition, revised. Oxford and New York: Oxford University Press. ISBN 978-0-19-861459-3.
- Lloyd, Norman. 1968. "Fanfare". The Golden Encyclopedia of Music. New York: Golden Press. Library of Congress Number 68-17169.
- Randel, Don Michael. 2003. "Fanfare". The Harvard Dictionary of Music, fourth edition. Harvard University Press Reference Library 16. Cambridge: Harvard University Press. ISBN 978-0-674-01163-2.
- Tarr, Edward H. 2001. "Fanfare". The New Grove Dictionary of Music and Musicians, second edition, edited by Stanley Sadie and John Tyrrell. London: Macmillan Publishers.
