= John Burn (geneticist) =

British geneticist

Sir John Burn FRCP FRCPE FRCOG FRCPCH FMedSci
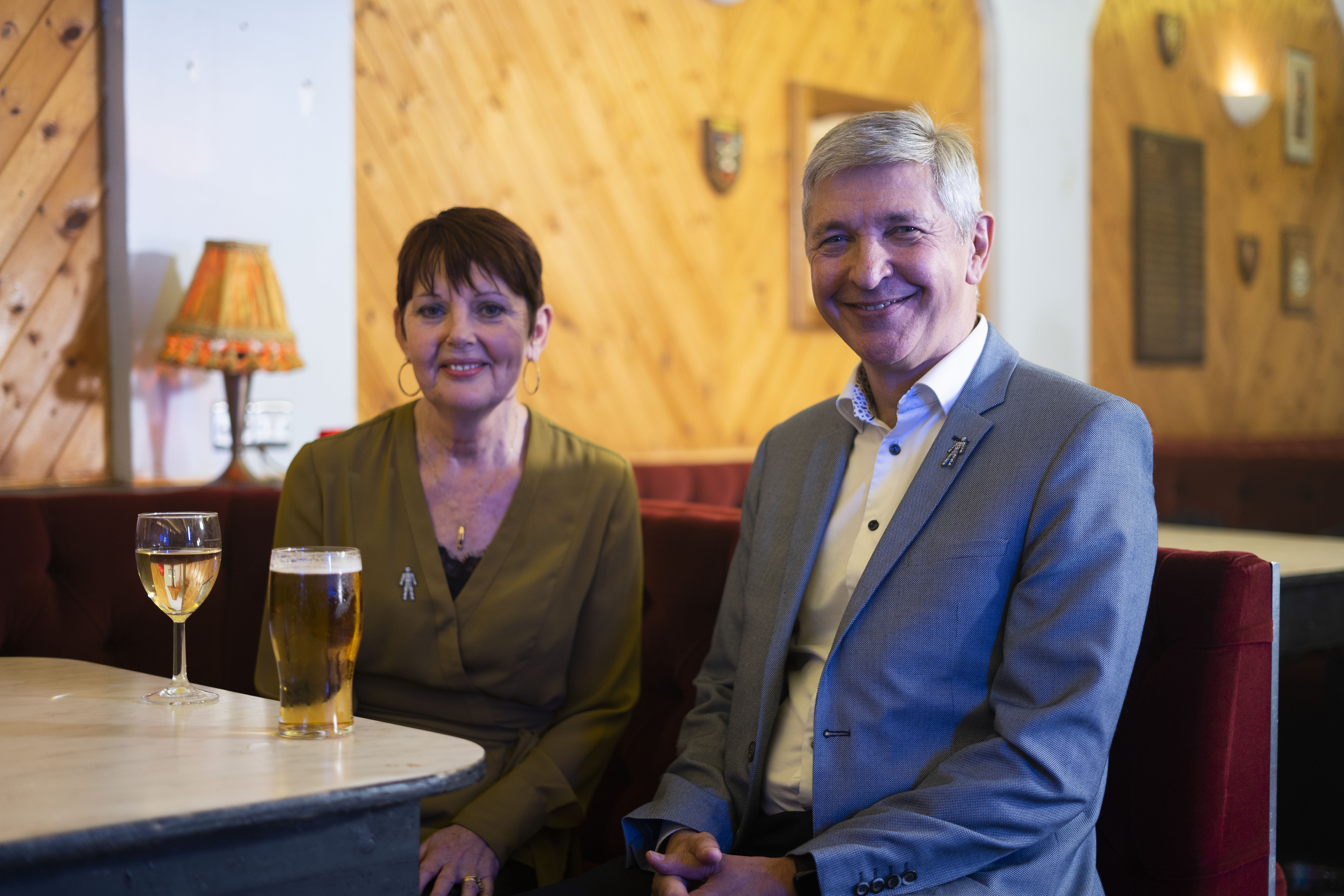
- Linda and John Burn at the Moth Club in Hackney, London, on 8 November 2021
- Born: 6 February 1952 (age 74)
- Education: Barnard Castle Grammar School; Newcastle University (MB BS, MD)
- Known for: Centre for Life; Human Variome Project
- Spouse: Linda Marjorie Wilson (m. 1972)
- Awards: Knight Bachelor (2010)
- Scientific career
- Fields: Cancer; Genetics
- Workplaces: Newcastle University; Great Ormond Street Hospital; Royal Victoria Infirmary
- Thesis: Cardiovascular malformation: an analysis of genetic contribution (1991)
- Website: www.ncl.ac.uk/igm/staff/profile/johnburn.html

Sir John Burn (born 6 February 1952) is a British professor of Clinical Genetics at Newcastle University and senior leader in England's National Health Service.

== Education ==
Burn was born and raised in the North East of England. He was educated at Barnard Castle Grammar School, (now Teesdale School) and Newcastle University Medical School from 1976 to 1980 where he was awarded a Bachelor of Medical Sciences (BMedSci) degree in 1973, a Bachelor of Medicine, Bachelor of Surgery (MB BS) in 1976 and a Doctor of Medicine (MD) degree in 1991.

== Career and research ==
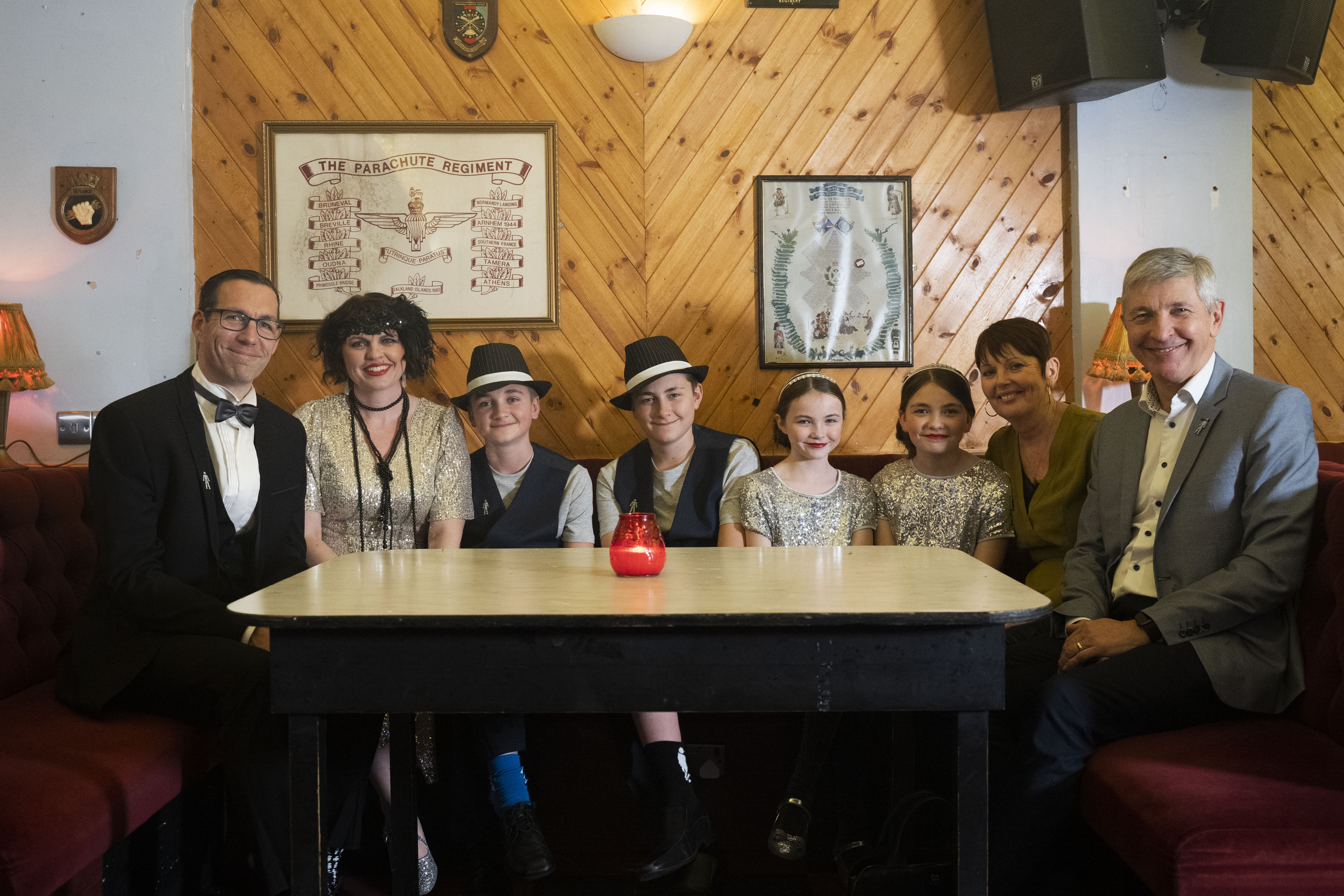
Linda and John Burn with the Marsh Family, which comprises their daughter, son-in-law, and four grandchildren, at the Moth Club on 8 November 2021

Burn has been Professor of Clinical Genetics at Newcastle University since 1991 and a consultant specialist since 1984. He is a recognised authority on the genetics of cancer. He led the regional NHS Genetics Service for 20 years and helped to create the Centre for Life which houses an education and science centre alongside the Institute of Genetic Medicine and Northgene Ltd, the identity testing company he launched in 1995. He chairs DNA device company QuantuMDx.

Between 2014 and 2018, he was a non-executive director of NHS England. In 2016, he was appointed Executive Chairman of Global Variome Ltd, a not-for-profit company supporting services to the international coordination work of the Human Variome Project.

In 2017, he became Chair of Newcastle upon Tyne Hospitals NHS Foundation Trust. His term as chair of the trust ended in 2024, and was taken over by Professor Kath McCourt.

=== Awards and honours ===
In 2010, Burn was appointed Knight Bachelor by Her Majesty Queen Elizabeth II for outstanding services to medicine. He was a Fellow of the Academy of Medical Sciences in 2000.

He was chosen as one of the first 20 'local heroes' to be commemorated with a brass plaque on Newcastle Quayside in 2014, and the following year, he received the Living North award for services to the North East 2000 – 2015.

The Harveian Oration 2019 was delivered by Burn, his lecture 'Prediction and prevention in the genomic era', outlined the history of genetic medicine, presented the challenges in using genetics to predict medical conditions and explained how he looks forward to seeing if we can use its full potential to prevent disease in the future.

In 2020, Burn was selected as the incumbent of the 2020 Niehaus, Southworth, Weissenbach Award and Visiting Professorship in Clinical Cancer Genetics at Memorial Sloan Kettering Cancer Center. The award recognises leaders in the translation of germline genetics to preventive care of cancer patients and their families. Due to COVID-19 restrictions, Burn did not receive his award and present his lecture until May 2021.

=== Media interest ===
He was interviewed by Jim Al-Khalili for The Life Scientific on Radio 4 first broadcast in February 2018.

Burn's daughter, son in law and grandkids earned national fame since the first lockdown in 2020 with a series of entertaining and quirky cover versions performed in their front room. The family surprised Burn with their Prostatectomy song, in homage to the successful operation he had to remove his prostate.
