= Symphony No. 4 (Hanson) =

Musical work; symphony in four movements composed by Howard Hanson

Symphony No. 4 Op. 34, "Requiem" (1943) by Howard Hanson (1896–1981) is Hanson's fourth symphony. It was inspired by the death of his father, taking its movement titles from sections of the Requiem Mass. He was awarded the 1944 Pulitzer Prize for Music, unanimously selected by the jury, for the piece. Hanson regarded it as his finest work.

1. Andante inquieto (Kyrie)
2. Elegy: Largo (Requiescat)
3. Presto (Dies irae)
4. Largo pastorale (Lux aeterna)

It was premiered by the Boston Symphony Orchestra on December 3, 1943, conducted by the composer and the radio premiere was January 2, 1944 by the NBC Symphony Orchestra with Leopold Stokowski. One of his least heard symphonies, "this work represents American Romanticism at its best."

== Discography ==
- Howard Hanson: Symphony No. 4; Suite from Merry Mount; Lament for Beowulf (Delos 1991) Seattle Symphony Orchestra, Gerard Schwarz conducting.
- Made In The USA (Delos 1992) Seattle Symphony Orchestra, Gerard Schwarz conducting.
- Howard Hanson: First Complete Symphonies and Other Works [Box set] (Delos 1994) Seattle Symphony Orchestra, Gerard Schwarz conducting.
- Music of Howard Hanson, Vol. 1 (Delos 1998) Seattle Symphony Orchestra, Gerard Schwarz conducting.
- Symphony 2 & 4 / Elegy (Arte Nova 1998).
- Hanson: Symphonies 2 & 4, Elegy (Arte Nova 2005).
