= Marsh Family =

English musical group

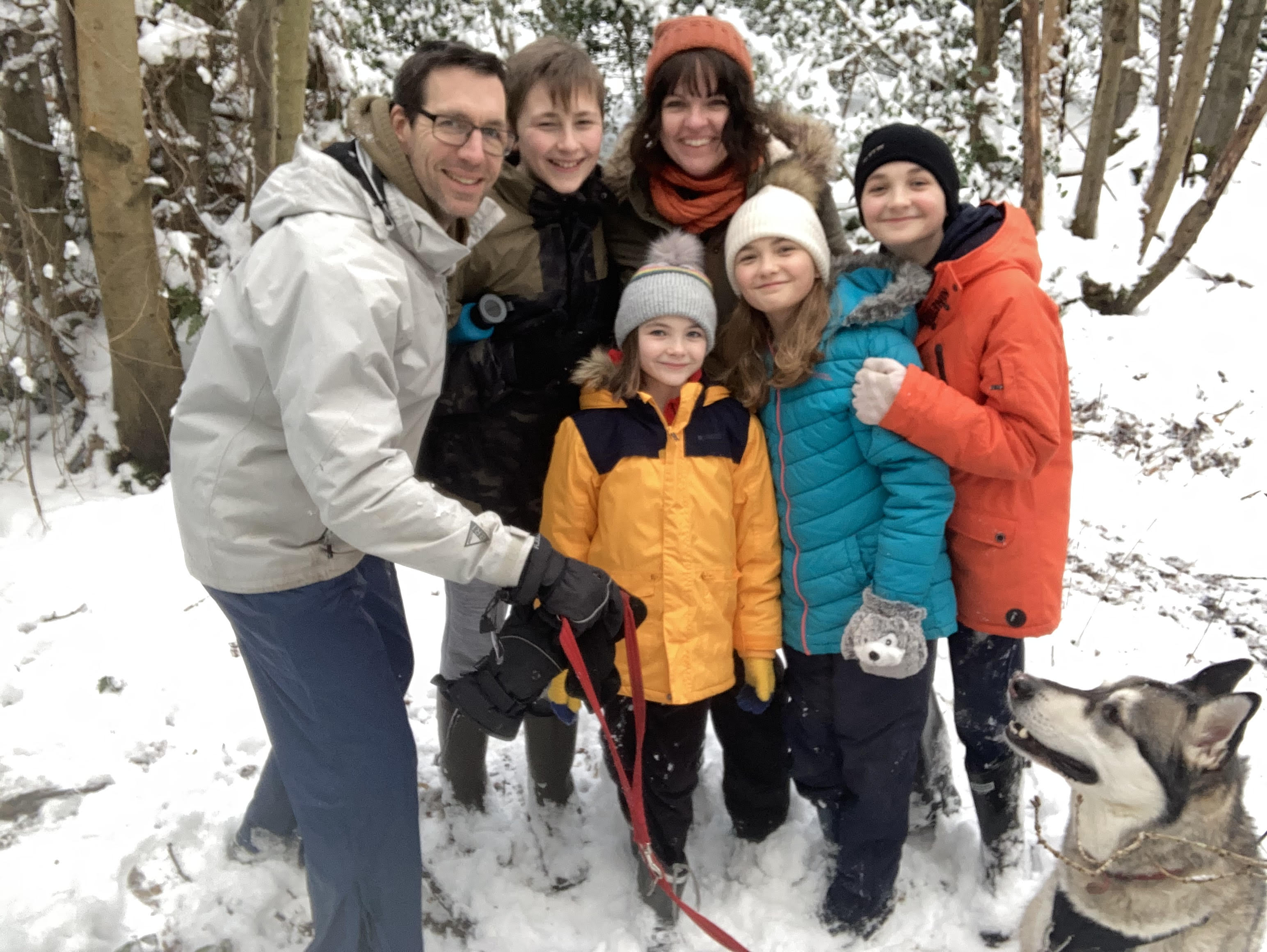
- The Marsh Family in the snow outside their house in Faversham on 11 February 2021. In the back row, from left to right, are Ben, Alfie, and Danielle Marsh. In the front row, from left to right, are Tess, Ella, and Thomas Marsh. Ben Marsh is holding the leash of the family's dog, Monty.
- Born: Ben Marsh; 1976 (age 49–50) (Note: An article in The New York Times published on 19 February 2021 said Ben Marsh was 44 years old. An article in PA Media published on 6 December 2021 said Ben Marsh was 45 years old. The combination of the two sources verifies that Ben Marsh turned 45 years old in 2021 which means he was born in 1976.) Danielle Marsh; 1977 (age 48–49) (Note: An article in The New York Times published on 19 February 2021 said Danielle Marsh was 43 years old. An article in PA Media published on 6 December 2021 said Danielle Marsh was 44 years old. The combination of the two sources verifies that Danielle Marsh turned 44 years old in 2021 which means she was born in 1977.) Alfie Marsh; 2006 (age 19–20) (Note: An article in The New York Times published on 19 February 2021 said Alfie Marsh was 14 years old. An article in PA Media published on 6 December 2021 said Alfie Marsh was 15 years old. The combination of the two sources verifies that Alfie Marsh turned 15 years old in 2021 which means he was born in 2006.) Thomas Marsh; 2007 or 2008 (age 18–19) Ella Marsh; 2009 (age 16–17) (Note: An article in The New York Times published on 19 February 2021 said Ella Marsh was 11 years old. An article in PA Media published on 6 December 2021 said Ella Marsh was 12 years old. The combination of the two sources verifies that Ella Marsh turned 12 years old in 2021 which means she was born in 2009.) Tess Marsh; 2011 or 2012 (age 14–15)
- Occupation: Singers

YouTube information
- Channel: Marsh Family
- Years active: 2020–present
- Genre: Singing
- Subscribers: 287 thousand
- Views: 53.7 million
- Last updated: 8 November 2026
- Website: www.marshfamilysongs.com

The Marsh Family are a British family musical group. The group consists of parents Ben and Danielle Marsh and their children Alfie, Thomas, Ella, and Tess. The family live in Faversham, a town in Kent in South East England.

The Marsh Family uploaded a parody of "One Day More" to Facebook on 29 March 2020, satirising life during COVID-19 lockdowns. The video went viral, reaching over seven million views in three days. It led to the family's earning international news coverage and appearing on ITV's This Morning and BBC Breakfast. During the COVID-19 pandemic, the family parodied numerous songs to describe their experiences. After the group's parody of "Total Eclipse of the Heart" went viral in February 2021, Isabella Kwai wrote in The New York Times, "This six-voice choir, with its sweet harmonies and the occasional wobbly note, is creating songs that dramatize the mundane moments of lockdown life, from too much screen time to the horrors of remote learning." With input from his family, Ben Marsh is the songwriter for most of the group's parodies.

== History ==
=== Early history ===
The Marsh Family is composed of parents Ben and Danielle Marsh and their children Alfie, Thomas, Ella, and Tess Marsh, who live in Faversham, a town in Kent in South East England. Ben and Danielle Marsh met while attending the University of Cambridge. At university shows, they performed as vocalists. They did a duet for "Don't Go Breaking My Heart", and Ben performed in the musical Anything Goes after Danielle had completed her studies. Danielle said in an interview, "We were in a strange relationship for most of our time at university; I knew that I wanted to spend my dotage with Ben, but it took him a while to realise it. So, we were friends, but not in a relationship until a while after we both left."

The family uploaded videos made in 2018 and 2019 of covers. The Arkansas Democrat-Gazette's Celia Storey said of the performances that the family "display youthful talent in all its hit-or-miss but heartwarming exuberance". They made covers of the A Star Is Born song "Shallow", the Avenue Q song "It Sucks to Be Me", and The Greatest Showman song "From Now On". In their From Now On cover, the kids sing and perform their instruments while wincing as Monty, their dog, is howling along.

=== Viral video: parody of "One Day More" ===
Beginning in March 2020, the Marsh Family increased the number of videos they posted. During the COVID-19 pandemic, the family became well-known with their parody covers that satirised life during COVID-19 lockdowns. Uploaded to Facebook on 29 March 2020, their parody of "One Day More" from Les Misérables went viral, reaching over seven million views in three days. Their aim was to amuse family members who had recent birthdays but whom they were unable to see in person: Danielle's mother, Ben's sister, and Danielle and Ben's niece. The lyrics, which Ben wrote in one afternoon the previous week, were inspired by the disappointments they experienced during the lockdown in not being able to meet their friends, having soccer games called off, being far away from grandparents, and having grandparents unaware of how to get Skype to work. Neither of the brothers wanted to play the suitor, Marius Pontmercy, while performing a duet with his sister. Once Ben modified the lyrics including changing "I was born to be with you" to "I am bored of being with you", Thomas acceded to playing Marius' part.

After a few dinner table rehearsals, the group filmed themselves performing the song on the afternoon of 29 March and uploaded the video to Facebook shortly before 11 pm. The video is taken in the living room which has photos of the family and a curtain with a floral pattern. Ella has on a dressing gown, and Thomas is wearing the previous year's Watford F.C. shirt. At the beginning of the video, siblings Thomas and Tess bicker: Thomas says Tess struck him, Tess responds that she touched him lightly, and Thomas rejoins that she has been doing this throughout the day. CBS News's Rose Manister said the sibling fight reflects the difficulty of being together all the time during the COVID-19 pandemic lockdown. The parents used pizza to convince the children to sing, and they completed the video in two takes with the video camera filming the entire process, including the bickering. The children sing, "Watch our daddy drink, see our mummy sigh, clapping for the NHS can make 'em cry." The viral video led to the family's receiving international news coverage and appearing on several television stations.

The children "belt out the song and really commit" with NPR calling the rendition "a delight" and The Daily Telegraph calling it "highly infectious". USA Today's Carly Mallenbaum wrote, "the harmonies and overlapping verses by all family members are extremely impressive". The Mary Sue's Kaila Hale-Stern wrote, "what makes this video really pop is the incredible vocalizing and dedication from all of the Marsh family members, down to the youngest child, who takes on the vocally challenging part usually sung by Eponine in the show". Noting that Alfie, the older son, brandishes a red jacket in parallel to the musical's rebellious Enjolras as he wields a red banner, Hale-Stern called the scene "brilliant staging". The Marsh Family were interviewed on ITV's This Morning by Phillip Schofield and Holly Willoughby on 30 March 2020 and on BBC Breakfast by Louise Minchin and Dan Walker on 31 March 2020.

=== Adaptation of songs during the COVID-19 pandemic ===
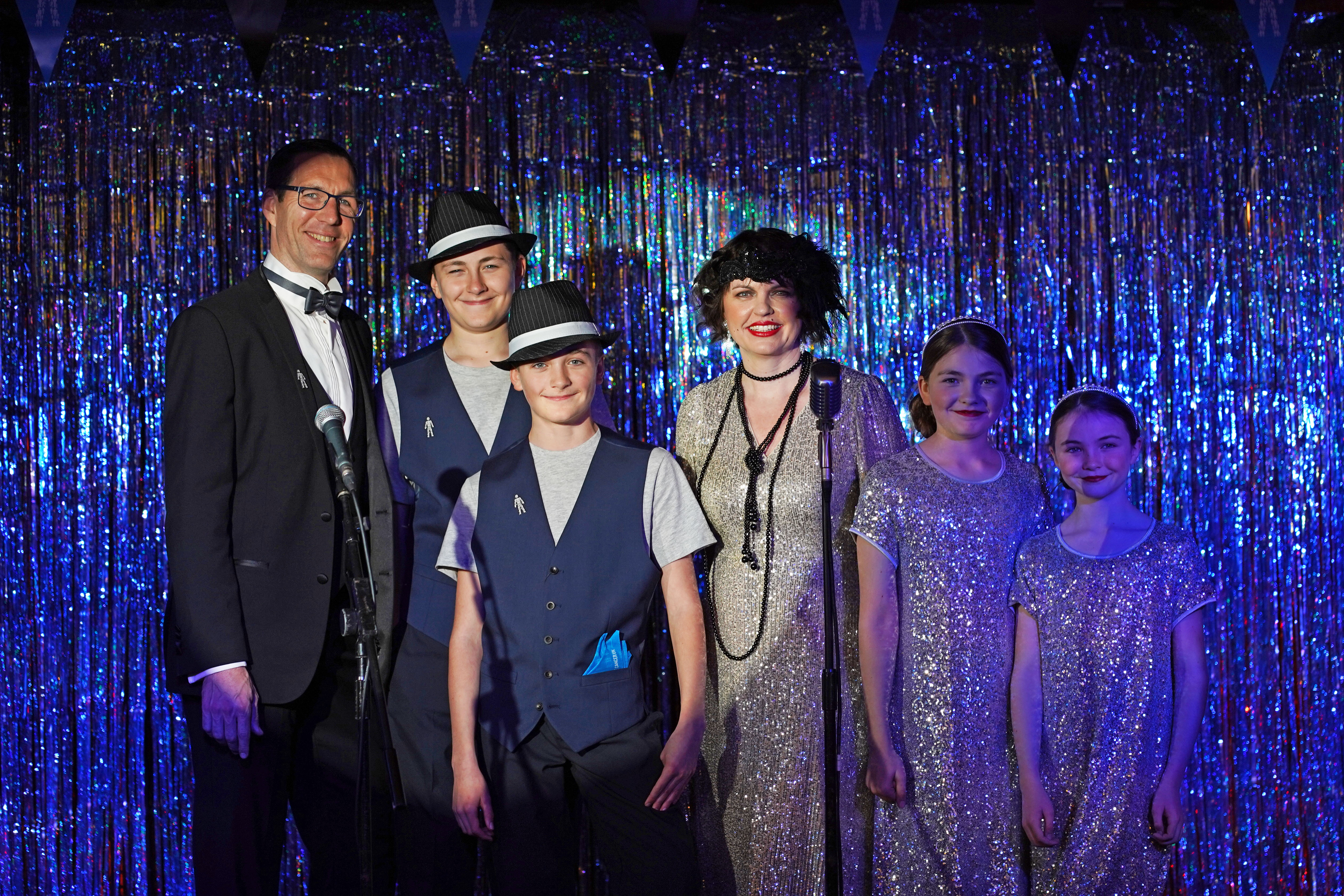
The Marsh Family performing in a "Mack the Knife (Prostate Cancer – Facts of Life)" music video filmed at the Moth Club in Hackney, London, on 8 November 2021 to raise money for Prostate Cancer UK. From left to right, are Ben, Alfie, Thomas, Danielle, Ella, and Tess Marsh.

During the COVID-19 pandemic, the family released many parodies of songs. They created their YouTube channel on 14 April 2020. Using a recording device they acquired during Christmas, the group performed a cover of the song "Under Pressure" without changing the lyrics as they felt it was appropriate for the pandemic. Moved by Black Lives Matter's overturning a slave trader's statue in Bristol, they created their own version of "Amazing Grace". To commemorate the safe completion of the children's grandfather's surgery in 2020, Ben Marsh composed the original piece "The Prostectomy Song". With "cheeky lyrics", the song included the verses, "With no prostate, //You can celebrate //You can contemplate, //You can weeeee!" Danielle Marsh's father, John Burn, had received a prostate cancer diagnosis in 2018. In "The Buy-in Eats Tonight", a February 2020 adaptation of "The Lion Sleeps Tonight", Thomas performed on the clarinet while Ella made "bat frequency high ahhs". The song reflects on how the family has become accustomed during the COVID-19 lockdown to ordering takeaway. Their May 2020 parody of Moana's "Where You Are" includes pessimistic commentary: "You'll be OK. /If not you'll learn just to hide it. /You must find happiness right where you are." "Have the New Jab", which parodies Leonard Cohen's "Hallelujah", contains "pointy humour" in its lyrics:

Maybe there's a plan above to implant things into our blood

But why on earth would Bill Gates want to rule ya?

And it's not a trick to get you spayed! It's not some change to our DNA!

It's a Covid-fighting weapon! Have the new jab.

Released in January 2021, the video features Ella and Tess Marsh and their father, Ben Marsh, and encourages people who are vaccine hesitant to take the COVID-19 vaccine. The song received applause from medical workers with Sarah Dickens, who heads research at Kent and Medway NHS and Social Care Partnership Trust, saying, "Well this may be the best thing I ever saw." Nadhim Zahawi, the Parliamentary Under-Secretary of State for COVID-19 Vaccine Deployment, praised the song, tweeting, "That has to be it! That has to be the theme tune for this national vaccination drive. Well done the Marsh family." "Test Monkey", a parody of "Dance Monkey", stars an orangutan puppet and bemoans the outages on a website for scheduling COVID-19 tests. "Somewhere (There's No Place for You)", which satirises West Side Story's "Somewhere (There's a Place for Us)". The performance features the orangutan who bickers with Ella and Tess Marsh, telling them they must be apart, "there's no place for them", and they must not hold hands.

In February 2021, the Marsh Family released a parody of Bonnie Tyler's "Total Eclipse of the Heart" titled "Totally Fixed Where We Are". After the adaptation received over two million YouTube views within a fortnight, Isabella Kwai of The New York Times profiled the group, writing, "This six-voice choir, with its sweet harmonies and the occasional wobbly note, is creating songs that dramatize the mundane moments of lockdown life, from too much screen time to the horrors of remote learning." Tyler, the song's original singer, praised the rendition, writing in a tweet, "Absolutely love this." Christy Somos of CTV News called the cover "an impassioned, tongue-in-cheek rendition", while The Independent's Jenny Eclair found it "cleverly re-worded and timely". Alfie and Thomas Marsh harmonise that their increased consumption of food during the pandemic may have made their clothes becoming more close-fitting. Ella and Tess Marsh sing that they are unable to determine whether they have gotten taller. The music video includes an "interpretive angst dance" from two of the children while the parents and the other two children go on their smartphones. The family reprised their performance of "Totally Fixed Where We Are" on the 2021 edition of the BBC show Comic Relief. The family gave away money they made from performances to Save the Children and the World Health Organization's COVID-19 Solidarity Response Fund. The Marsh Family wrote a letter for Natasha Kaplinsky's 2021 book Letters from Lockdown in which they answered the question "What was lockdown like for you?"

They performed the songs "I Know Them Too Well", which parodies Chess's "I Know Him So Well"; "Ten School Commandments", which satirises Hamilton's "Ten Duel Commandments"; and "From a (Social) Distance", which parodies the Julie Gold song "From a Distance". The Marsh Family's rendition of "Freedom of Life", a parody of Sweet Charity's "Freedom of Life", received praise for being "catchy" and for showcasing Ben Marsh's baritone. Adapting Les Misérables's "Do You Hear the People Sing? to have an optimistic tone, in "From a (Social) Distance", the family conveyed the idea of a reopened world "When tomorrow comes". They parodied the musical's "One Day More" with the kids conversing with each other saying, "I am bored of being with you", "Do we get a change of clothes?" and "Have you seen my brother's hair?!" For their March 2021 song "Goodbye Pandemic Road", they parodied the Elton John song "Goodbye Yellow Brick Road". The Marsh Family released the song "Lockdown World", a parody of the Billy Joel song "Uptown Girl" ahead of the loosening of the lockdown restrictions on 19 July 2021. It included "clever lyrics", having "time" and "confined" rhyme as well as "vaccines" and "spike proteins" rhyme. In December 2021, they released "Mack the Knife (Prostate Cancer – Facts of Life)" to raise awareness about prostate cancer which Danielle Marsh's father had recovered from after surgery. Written by Ben Marsh, the song parodies the Bobby Darin song "Mack the Knife". Filmed at the Moth Club in Hackney, London, the music video showcases employees from Prostate Cancer UK and Danielle Marsh's parents, John and Linda Burn. The Marshes made the video to raise money for Prostate Cancer UK.

=== Parody songs based on British politics ===
In 2022, following the Partygate scandal, they wrote and released the original song "We'll Have To Wait For Sue Gray's Enquiry", parodying Prime Minister Boris Johnson refusing to answer questions, and asking everyone to wait for the enquiry led by Sue Gray. Following this, they moved into much more regular political satire in their parodies, with songs such as "Don't Come Back", a parody of "You'll Be Back" from "Hamilton" about the plan to deport migrants from the UK to Rwanda, "Send Out The Clown", a parody of the Sondheim song "Send In The Clowns" about Boris Johnson leaving office and "This Liz Truss Must Hide", a parody of "This Jesus Must Die" from "Jesus Christ Superstar" about his successor. They released a number of parodies of "Wellerman" about the political career and views of Home Secretary Suella Braverman. In 2024, they released a number of parodies relating to the 2024 United Kingdom general election, including a parody of David Bowie's hit "Starman" called "Starmer", a medley of parodies of the Elton John song "I'm Still Standing" and "Raindrops Keep Falling On My Head" about the start of the Conservative campaign, and an original song called "The Little Racist Frog", which whilst it never officially stated it, strongly hinted to being about Nigel Farage. Their 2026 song "5 Million Quid" is a parody of The Proclaimers "I'm Gonna Be (500 miles)", and is a reference to Nigel Farage's recent gift from a Thai businessman.

=== Parody songs based on American politics ===
Having already released a number of songs about UK politics, in 2024, they began to release songs about American politics. On 20 July they posted to YouTube "Vance VP," sung to "Dancing Queen" by ABBA, about JD Vance, who had been selected by Donald Trump as his vice presidential candidate. On its YouTube page, the Marshes explain,

We chose for the parody subject matter the official approval at the convention this week of JD Vance as Donald Trump's running mate for the presidential ticket for the Republican Party. It's probably fair to say that Vance is very little known on this side of the pond – hence the need for some additional info and graphics on this video – but he made an ill-advised splash in our world by mouthing off about the UK, pretending a concern about nuclear proliferation (when for a long time he's been helping facilitate Putin's aggression) and half-jokingly describing the UK as an "Islamist country". This prompted politicians from across the spectrum to condemn his comments... So since he dished it out, and since - for obvious (but different) reasons - now is not an appropriate moment for a song about either Trump or Biden, here's our less-than-impressed profile of yet another populist politician with highly flexible morality, worrying contempt for democratic process and discourse, but big funding and a big mouth who's happy to tap into ordinary people's fears while claiming to be an example of their dreams.

"Gimme Hope Kamala", released on 20 August 2024, and based on "Gimme Hope Jo'anna", was written to support Kamala Harris in the 2024 United States presidential election. A journalist wrote that the song went viral, as it "critiques Donald Trump while praising Kamala Harris, amassing nearly 1.4 million views on YouTube. The catchy tune has sparked lively discussions on X, especially given that the family hails from the UK, prompting mixed reactions from listeners... The song draws inspiration from Eddy Grant's iconic 'Gimme Hope Jo'Anna,' originally released in 1988, which addressed international politics during the Apartheid era in South Africa." On its YouTube page, the Marshes explain,

With only a matter of weeks until the pivotal US Presidential Election in November, and the Democratic National Convention having begun today, we decided to revisit the magnificent Eddy Grant's controversial and catchy anthem about international politics in the time of Apartheid in South Africa - "Gimme Hope Jo'Anna". The original song was written and recorded in 1988 by the British-Guyanese artist as an anti-apartheid British musical intervention (it didn't chart in the US) and it was banned by the SA government for daring to critique and offer hope for change in Johannesburg (Jo'Anna) and beyond. So we've flipped the concept back to a person - because that's how the US contest is always configured - and set up Kamala Harris as the centre of the chorus as she now occupies the centrepiece of hope for those wishing to avoid another Donald Trump administration. There are a few lateral references to Trumpisms (such as his claim that he shared a helicopter ride, or that Americans would never have to vote again if they elected him). But it just felt a good fit to be able to sing something upbeat and positive - and for our two girls to see the most powerful person in the world might be about to be a woman for the first time, in contrast to Trump's track record on gender and rights.

On 1 March 2025, the family uploaded "Puppets on a Kremlin String," about the betrayal of Ukrainian president Volodymyr Zelenskyy by Donald Trump and JD Vance to Russian dictator Vladimir Putin, to the tune of Coldplay's song "Viva La Vida". The Marshes write, "Our version takes the sense of history, the pain, the trauma, and the notion of world rule, and applies it to the most disgusting media spectacle to date - with already several to choose from - of the new US administration. Like many around the world, as well as disheartened friends in the US, we watched the undignified ambush of Zelensky's trip to the White House with dismay and pity. It was a very unbecoming sight - just at a human level - even without all the higher stakes, deals, implications, and nightmares unfolding as another win is handed to Putin, and more pressure placed on Ukraine. Like many we are hoping for a miraculous path forward that can somehow turn Trump's intensity into an outcome that can transform into a lasting peace - but given how misdirected the fury and energy and narrative is at the moment, it's quite hard to see it turning out other than a quickfire US withdrawal of support. If that happens, we're in a cowardly new world."

On 22 March 2025, the family uploaded "I Put Up Tariffs," based on "I Shot the Sheriff" by Bob Marley and the Wailers. The Marshes admit of their hectic production schedule, "Amidst the sorting and practicing, unfortunately no one noticed Tom was not visible in the shot. So you've been spared his groove, though we dropped in a couple of post-cut shots to show you where he was." The song discusses Trump's penchant for slapping tariffs on friendly trading partners in his first 100 days in the White House. The Marsh family say they wanted "to tell the story of Donald Trump's favourite toys: tariffs, which he has already taken action on, and promised to do much more as he shakes up the world order, starting with upsetting his nearest neighbours. The consensus is that the tariffs didn't do what he claimed they would in his first term, and that they are now actively threatening stock prices, confidence, capital expenditure, trade flows, and all out economic war with old and new blocs retaliating. It's a scene we've seen before, hence the reference to the "Smoot-Hawley" act of 1930 which raised tariffs on 20,000 US imports and helped prompt a global downturn and deepen the Great Depression."

On 25 March 2025, they posted "You Were Not Supposed to Message It Through," to the music of the Bee Gees' "I've Gotta Get a Message to You," about the United States government group chat leak, a political scandal also known as "Signalgate." The song references chat members Mike Waltz, Tulsi Gabbard, and Pete Hegseth.

=== Other songs ===
In January 2024, the Marsh family released "They Should Be Cleared, Though", based on "Holding Out for a Hero" by Bonnie Tyler, expressing solidarity with the victims of the Post Office Horizon scandal following the release of the television drama Mr Bates vs The Post Office.

In December 2024, they released "Legal Case That’s Like No Other", based on Paul Simon's 1975 hit "50 Ways to Leave Your Lover", which they intended to express solidarity with Gisèle Pelicot following the conviction of her husband and fifty other men. Following criticism of the tastelessness of the song, they removed the song from online platforms, stating: "The message we intended from the song - commending Gisèle Pelicot’s remarkable resilience and bravery in waiving anonymity, and utterly condemning those convicted - was not getting across".

== Members ==
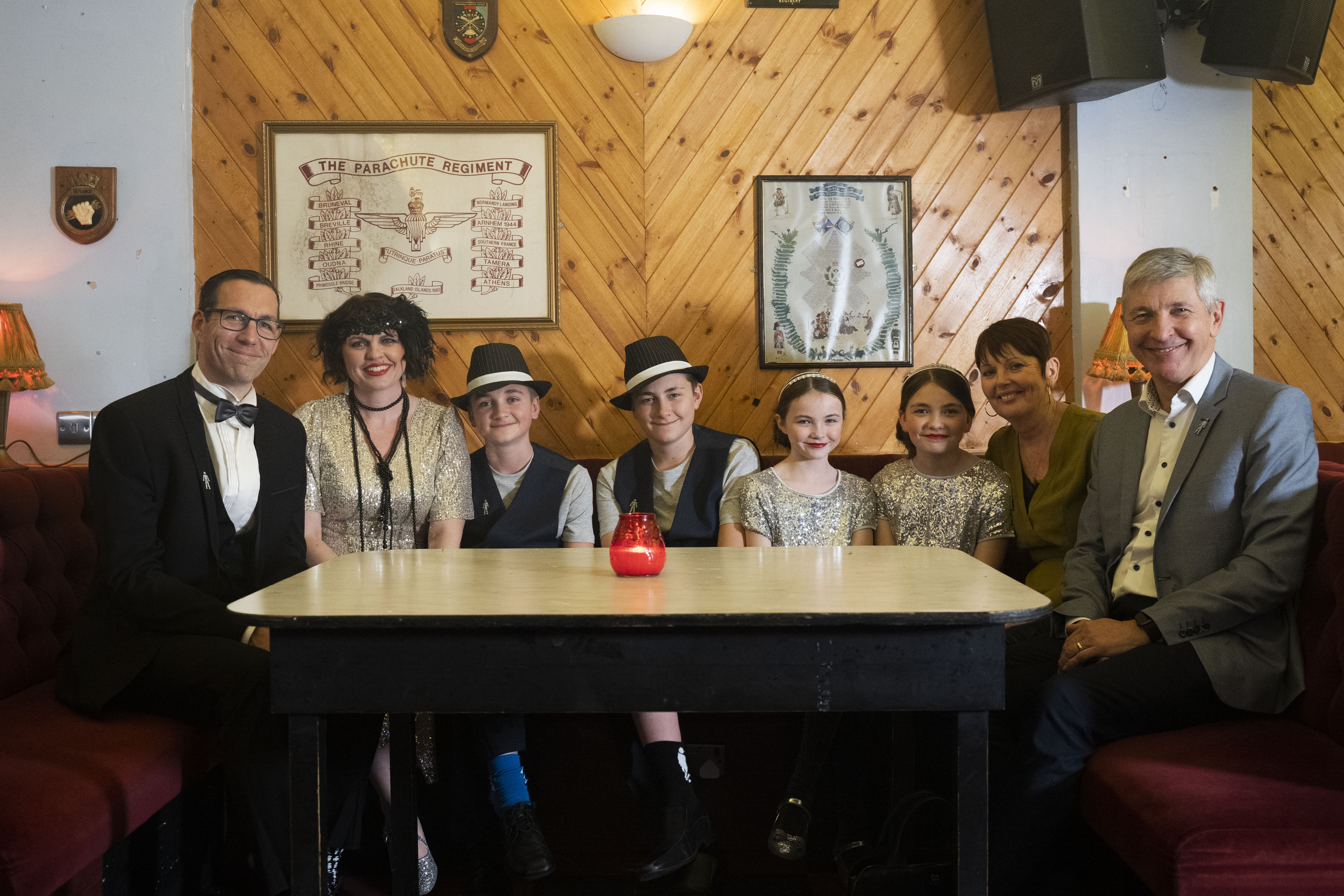
The Marsh Family with Linda and John Burn, Danielle Marsh's parents, at the Moth Club in Hackney, London, on 8 November 2021. From left to right, are Ben, Danielle, Thomas, Alfie, Tess, and Ella Marsh; and Linda and John Burn.

- Ben Marsh (born in 1976), the father, is a history lecturer at the University of Kent who specialises in the colonial history of the United States. In 1995, he entered the University of Cambridge's Downing College, where he received a history degree. Marsh authored the 2007 book Georgia's Frontier Women: Female Fortunes in a Southern Colony. Book reviewer Kent Anderson Leslie praised the book, calling it "an important text and sets a high standard of inclusive, insightful scholarship". Marsh wrote a second book, Unravelled Dreams: Silk and the Atlantic World, 1500-1840, in 2020. It received the Hagley Prize in Business History, which is organised by the Hagley Museum and Library and Business History Conference. Book reviewer Paul D Blanc penned a positive review of the book, stating that it "is valuable in its own right, but it also is worthy for the foundation it provides to reconsider more broadly the decolonial ecology of textiles". The historian Patricia Fara wrote that Marsh "skilfully converts entrepreneurial losses into scholarly gains, providing a much-needed counterbalance to triumphalist tales of innovative success and unsettling easy assumptions of inevitable technological progress".
- Danielle Marsh (born in 1977), the mother, is a university administrator. Her parents are John Burn, a professor and geneticist, and Linda Burn. She is a research programs coordinator in the Education & Student Experience division of the Kent Business School. She became a history instructor after receiving a history degree from the University of Cambridge's Downing College, which she had entered in 1995.
- Alfie Marsh (born in 2006)
- Thomas Marsh (born in 2007 or 2008)
- Ella Marsh (born in 2009)
- Tess Marsh (born in 2011 or 2012)

Although Ben and Danielle Marsh do not have a musical theatre background, Ben's parents teach music. Aside from their performances in school plays and musical instrument classes, the children have not received musical theatre instruction. Collectively they play the bass guitar, clarinet, cornet, drums, piano, and violin. The family has a dog, Monty, which appears in their music videos. They adopted a puppy, Boo, in 2021.

== Artistry ==
Before the pandemic, the family had rewritten the lyrics of songs they had heard. Ben Marsh is the songwriter for nearly all of the family's adaptations. He makes an adaptation proposal and his children evaluate and can reject it which they did for satirising the song "Oklahoma" as "Oh Corona!" They purchased a laptop for audio mixing. Celia Storey wrote in the Arkansas Democrat-Gazette, "All the adaptations have clever lyrics and some have choreography." The Marsh Family were likened to The von Trapps and The Partridge Family.
