= Martin Koch =

Martin Koch may refer to:

- Martin Koch (orchestrator), British orchestrator, musical supervisor, arranger, and conductor
- Martin Koch (novelist) (1882–1940), Swedish novelist
- Martin Koch (ski jumper) (born 1982), Austrian ski jumper
- Martin Koch (cyclist) (1887–1961), German Olympic cyclist
