= Anis Fuleihan =

American classical composer

Anis Fuleihan (April 2, 1900 - October 11, 1970) was a Cypriot-born American composer, conductor and pianist.

A native of Kyrenia, Fuleihan belonged to a Christian Lebanese family; he attended the English School in that town before coming to the United States in 1915. He settled in New York City, taking further piano lessons with Alberto Jonas; he also taught himself composition at this time. His debut of "Oriental Fantasies" at the Aeolian Hall in 1919 was well received. He became a United States citizen in 1925.

Fuleihan toured the US and the Middle East from 1919 until 1925, living for a time in Cairo before returning to the United States in 1928. Resettling in New York, he began to compose music for ballets put on by various contemporary dance organizations; he also found work as a conductor for radio at this time. Beginning in 1932 he worked for G. Schirmer, continuing in this capacity until 1939. In 1945 he began to teach at Indiana University Bloomington, Indiana, where composer Mary McCarty Snow was one of his students. In 1953 he assumed the directorship of the Beirut Conservatory in Lebanon. In 1962 he went to Tunis as part of a program organized by the State Department; in 1963 he organized the Orchestre Classique de Tunis, remaining there until 1965.

As a composer, Fuleihan attracted the attention of Eugene Goossens, who premiered his Mediterranean Suite, and who assisted in his reception of a Guggenheim Fellowship. He obtained several commissions and teaching posts in the Middle East. Fuleihan's music generally avoided serial structures, and was heavily influenced by Middle Eastern folk music. One of his works is a concerto for theremin, premiered by the New York Philharmonic under Leopold Stokowski in 1945; the soloist was Clara Rockmore.

Fuleihan died in Palo Alto, California in 1970.
