= Symphony No. 3 (Hanson) =

Musical work; symphony in four movements composed by Howard Hanson

Symphony No. 3 (1938) is a symphony in four movements composed by American composer Howard Hanson (1896–1981). The first three movements were finished in 1936, a revision in 1938 added the finale movement to the symphony. A typical performance time is approximately 36 minutes. The work, commissioned by the CBS Symphony Orchestra, was written in commemoration of the 300th anniversary of the first Swedish settlement in Delaware in 1638.

== Instrumentation ==
Symphony No. 3 is scored for two flutes, one piccolo, two oboes, one English horn, two clarinets in B♭, one bass clarinet, two bassoons, one contrabassoon, four horns in F, three trumpets in C, three trombones, one tuba, timpani, and strings.

== Movements ==
There are four movements:

1. Andante lamentando – Agitato
2. Andante tranquillo
3. Tempo scherzando
4. Largamente e pesante

== Performances and publishing ==
The first three movements were performed on September 19, 1937, conducted by the composer himself. The first performance of the work in its entirety was given on March 26, 1938 by the composer conducting the NBC Symphony Orchestra. It was later performed in its first subscription season appearance by the Boston Symphony Orchestra in November, 1939, conducted by Serge Koussevitzky. The symphony was published by C. C. Birchard of Boston for the Eastman School of Music in 1941.

== Recordings ==
There are three commercial recordings of this work currently released, a 1940 recording of Koussevitzky conducting the Boston Symphony Orchestra released by Biddulph Recordings, a 1966 recording conducted by Hanson with the Eastman-Rochester Orchestra released by Mercury Records, and a Naxos recording of Gerard Schwarz conducting the Seattle Symphony Orchestra.
