= Symphony No. 6 (Hanson) =

Orchestral symphony in six movements composed by Howard Hanson

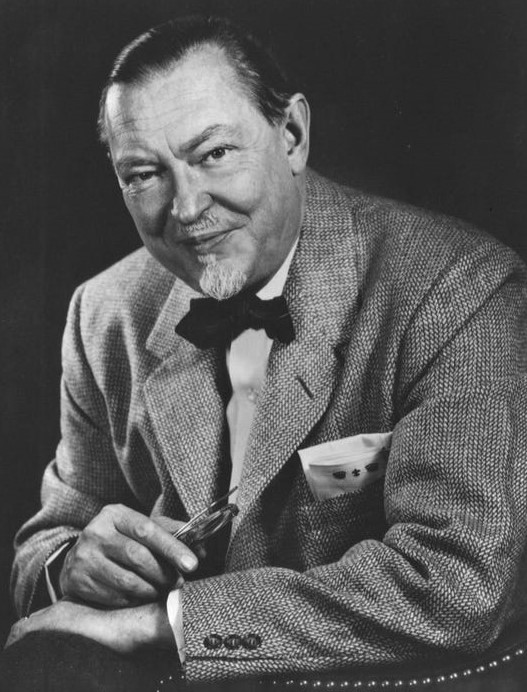
Howard Hanson, 1959

The Symphony No. 6 is an orchestral symphony in six movements by the American composer Howard Hanson. The work was commissioned by the New York Philharmonic under the direction of Leonard Bernstein for the orchestra's 125th anniversary. It was composed in 1967 and was given its world premiere on February 29, 1968, by the New York Philharmonic conducted by Hanson.

== Structure ==
The symphony has a duration of roughly 20 minutes and is composed in six continuous movements:

1. Andante
2. Allegro scherzando
3. Adagio
4. Allegro assai
5. Adagio
6. Allegro

== Reception ==
The Symphony No. 6 has been praised by music critics. John von Rhein of the Chicago Tribune called it "one of [Hanson's] most formally innovative" symphonies. Andrew Achenbach of Gramophone similarly wrote, "it boasts a formidable thematic economy and intriguing formal scheme of which Hanson himself was justifiably proud."
