= One Day More =

"Demain"

Song by Les Misérables Ensemble

from the album Les Misérables
- Language: French (original)
- English title: One Day More
- Published: 1980
- Recorded: 1980 (French cast recording); 1985 (London cast recording); 1987 (Broadway cast recording); 2012 (Film cast recording)
- Genre: Show tune
- Length: 3:36 (London cast recording)
- Composer: Claude-Michel Schönberg
- Lyricists: Alain Boublil; Jean-Marc Natel; Herbert Kretzmer

"One Day More" ("Demain", Tomorrow, in the original French version) is a song from the 1980 musical Les Misérables. The music was written by Claude-Michel Schönberg, original French lyrics by Alain Boublil and Jean-Marc Natel, with an English-language libretto by Herbert Kretzmer. The song is sung by the entire chorus, using a counterpoint melody.

Les Misérables was originally released as a French-language concept album, as French songwriter Alain Boublil had had the idea to adapt Victor Hugo's novel into a musical while at a performance of the musical Oliver! in London.

The show and the song have been translated into 21 languages, including Japanese, Hebrew, Icelandic, Norwegian, Czech, Polish, Spanish, and Estonian, and there have been 31 cast recordings featuring the song. The London cast version is triple platinum in the UK, for sales of more than 900,000, and platinum in the U.S., for sales of more than one million. The Broadway cast version is quadruple platinum in the U.S. (more than four million sold), where four other versions have also received gold certifications.

== Certifications ==
Region	Certification	Certified units/sales
United Kingdom (BPI)	Silver	200,000^{‡}
^{‡} Sales+streaming figures based on certification alone.

== In popular culture ==
In 2012, musical theater performer and composer Michael Bihovsky composed a parody of this song about gluten-free and hypoallergenic food called "One Grain More".

The song was performed by the 2012 film cast for the 85th Academy Awards. This version features alterations such as replacing Marius' lines prior to his duet with Cosette with parts of Fantine's song "I Dreamed a Dream", and merging or omitting small portions of the lyrics.

"One Day More" was parodied by the Marsh Family, a British family, in a video that went viral and was covered by NPR. The parody describes the social and economic implications on normal life due to the COVID-19 pandemic.

In 2017, the song was covered by the cast of the Magicians in season 2, episode 9 – Lesser Evils.

"One Day More" was parodied by James Corden and an ensemble of Broadway cast members on January 19, 2021, the last day of the presidency of Donald Trump and day before the inauguration of Joe Biden. The parody's lyrics frequently reference both the COVID pandemic and the events during and after supporters of Trump stormed the United States Capitol.
