= Howard Hanson =

American composer and music theorist (1896–1981)

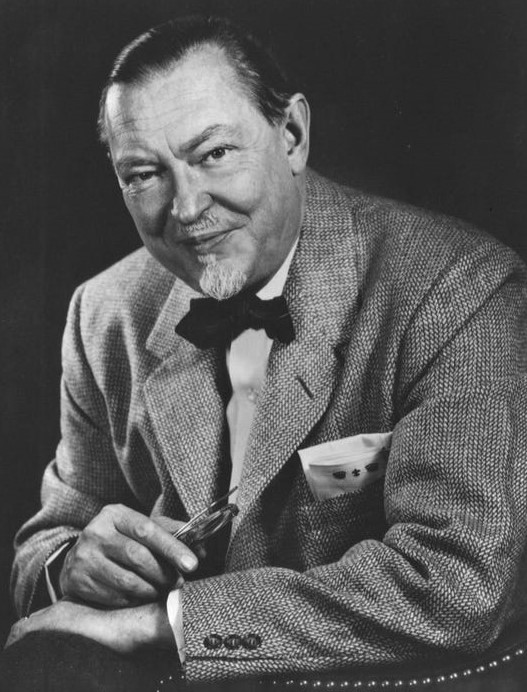
- Howard Hanson, 1959
- Born: Howard Harold Hanson; October 28, 1896; Wahoo, Nebraska, US
- Died: February 26, 1981 (aged 84); Rochester, New York, US
- Education: Northwestern University
- Occupations: Composer, conductor, educator, music theorist
- Years active: 1916–1981
- Spouse: Margaret Elizabeth Nelson
- Awards: Pulitzer Prize; George Foster Peabody Award

Howard Harold Hanson (October 28, 1896 – February 26, 1981) was an American composer, conductor, educator and music theorist. As director for forty years of the Eastman School of Music, he raised its quality and provided opportunities for commissioning and performing American classical music. In 1944, he won a Pulitzer Prize for his Symphony No. 4, and received numerous other awards, including the George Foster Peabody Award for Outstanding Entertainment in Music in 1946.

== Early life and education ==
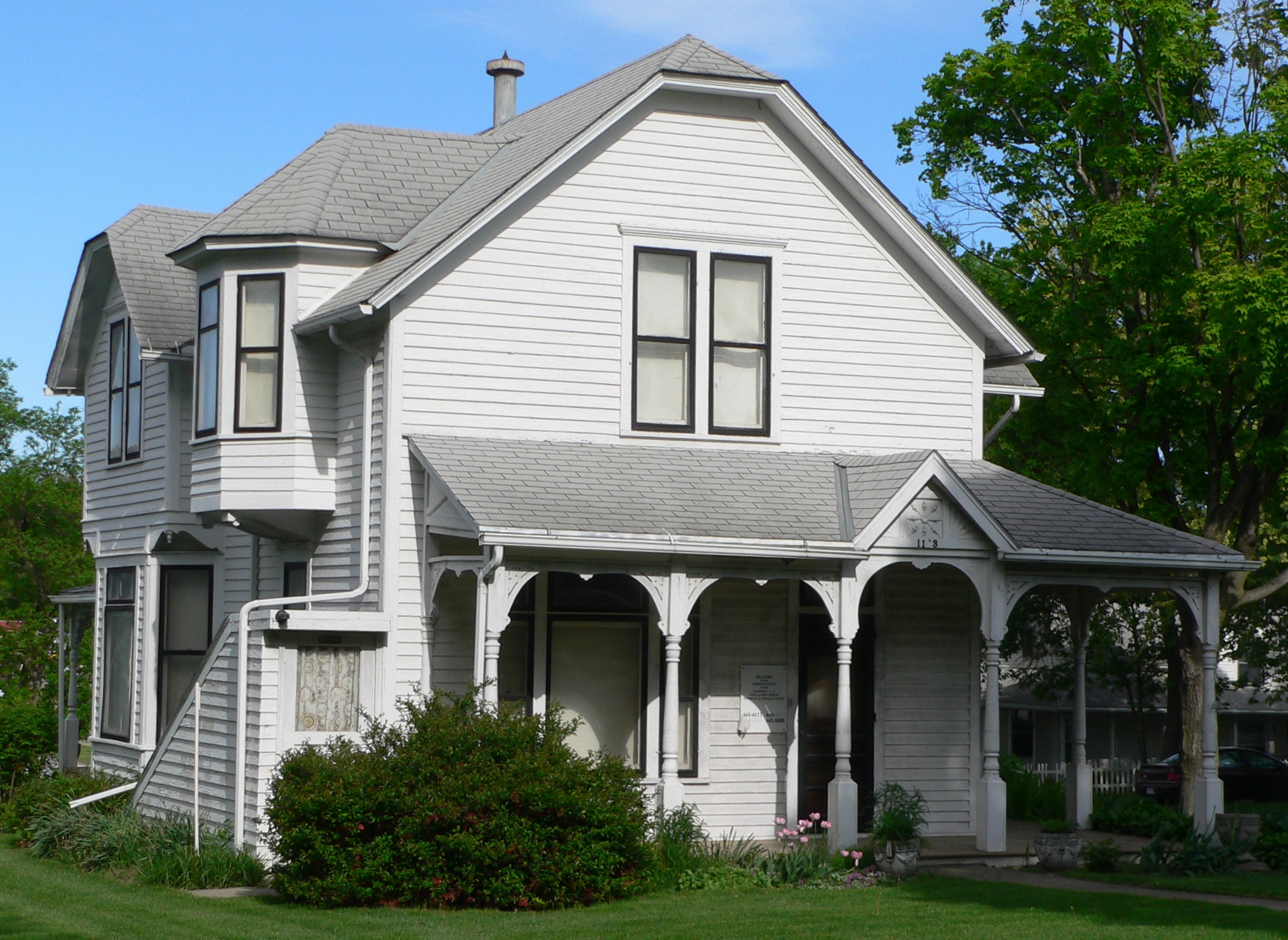
Hanson's boyhood home in Wahoo, Nebraska is on the National Register of Historic Places.

Hanson was born in Wahoo, Nebraska, to Swedish immigrant parents, Hans and Hilma (née Eckstrom) Hanson. In his youth he studied music with his mother. Later, he studied at Luther College in Wahoo, receiving a diploma in 1911, then at the Institute of Musical Art, the forerunner of the Juilliard School, in New York City, where he studied with the composer and music theorist Percy Goetschius in 1914.

Afterward he attended Northwestern University, where he studied composition with church music expert Peter C. Lutkin and Arne Oldberg. Hanson also studied piano, cello, and trombone. He earned his BA degree in music from Northwestern in 1916, and began his teaching career as a teacher's assistant.

== Career ==
=== College of the Pacific ===
In 1916, Hanson was hired for his first full-time position as a music theory and composition teacher at the College of the Pacific in California. Only three years later, the college appointed him Dean of the Conservatory of Fine Arts in 1919. In 1920, Hanson composed The California Forest Play, his earliest work to receive national attention. Hanson also wrote a number of orchestral and chamber works during his years in California, including Concerto da Camera, Symphonic Legend, Symphonic Rhapsody, various solo piano works, such as Two Yuletide Pieces, and the Scandinavian Suite, which celebrated his Lutheran and Scandinavian heritage.

=== American Academy in Rome ===
In 1921 Hanson was the first winner of the American Academy in Rome's "Rome Prize" in musical composition, awarded for both The California Forest Play and his symphonic poem Before the Dawn. Thanks to the award, Hanson lived in Italy for three years. During his time in Italy, Hanson wrote a Quartet in One Movement, Lux Aeterna, The Lament for Beowulf (orchestration Bernhard Kaun), and his Symphony No. 1, "Nordic", the premiere of which he conducted with the Augusteo Orchestra on May 30, 1923. The three years Hanson spent on his Fellowship at the American Academy were, he considered, the formative years of his life, as he was free to compose, conduct without the distraction of teaching—he could devote himself solely to his art.

==== Ottorino Respighi ====
It has been claimed that Hanson studied composition and/or orchestration with Ottorino Respighi, who in turn had studied orchestration with Nikolay Rimsky-Korsakov. Citing several sources, John A. Dobnicki of CUNY York College wrote, "[T]aking up fellowship residence in Rome for three years, Hanson studied orchestration under Ottorino Respighi and devoted himself to composition, writing his Symphony No. 1 ('Nordic,' 1922) and two symphonic poems, and began work on his major choral work, The Lament for Beowulf, which was completed in the United States in 1925." However, Hanson's unpublished autobiography denies that he studied with Respighi. Hanson may have merely received advice from Respighi rather than formally studying with him. In addition, Respighi invited Hanson to attend rehearsals and performances of his orchestral concerts. As a result of these interactions, Hanson credited Respighi as a significant influence on his use of orchestral textures and instrumentation. He also cited several other composers as influences while studying in Rome including Nicolai Rimsky-Korsakov, Gustav Holst, Giovanni Palestrina and Richard Wagner.

=== University of Rochester - Eastman School of Music ===
Upon returning from Rome, Hanson's conducting career expanded. He made his premiere conducting the New York Symphony Orchestra in his tone poem North and West. In Rochester, New York in 1924, he conducted his Symphony No. 1. This performance brought him to the attention of George Eastman.

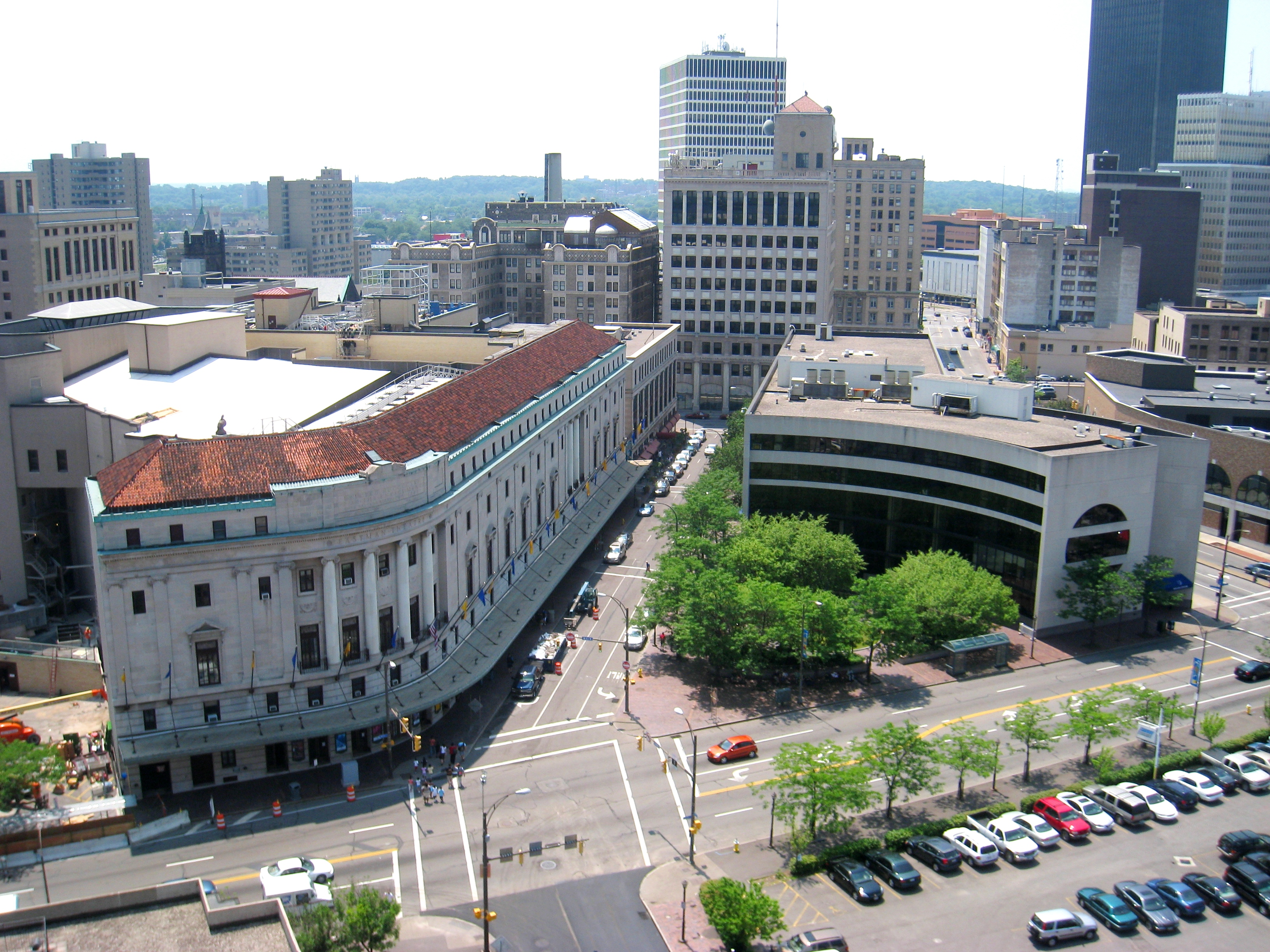
Eastman School of Music – University of Rochester – general view

In 1924, Eastman chose Hanson to be director of the Eastman School of Music. Eastman, inventor of the Kodak camera and roll film, was also a major philanthropist, and used some of his great wealth to endow the Eastman School of Music at the University of Rochester.

Hanson held the position of director for forty years, during which he created one of the most prestigious music schools in America. He accomplished this by improving the curriculum, bringing in better teachers, and refining the school's orchestras. Also, he balanced the school's faculty between American and European teachers, even when this meant passing up composer Béla Bartók. Hanson offered a position to Bartók teaching composition at Eastman, but Bartók declined as he did not believe that one could teach composition. Instead, Bartók wanted to teach piano at the Eastman School, but Hanson already had a full staff of piano instructors. Here is how the noted conductor Kenneth Woods described the incident:

Since emigrating from Hungary to the US in 1940, Bartók had endured a period of terrible neglect, poverty and homesickness. Howard Hanson, the reactionary and xenophobic president of the Eastman School of Music, had turned away Bartók’s application for a teaching position in spite of his reputation as possibly the most important living composer and ethnomusicologist of his day.

External audio
- You may hear Howard Hanson conducting his Symphony No. 1 in E minor Op. 21 (Nordic) with the Eastman-Rochester Symphony Orchestra in 1944 Here on archive.org
- You may hear Howard Hanson conducting his Symphony No. 5 (Sinfonia Sacra) Op.43 with his Eastman-Rochester Symphony Orchestra and Chorus; Here on archive.org

In 1925, Hanson established the American Composers Orchestral Concerts. He followed that in 1931 by establishing the annual Festivals of American Music. These week long concerts were free to the public and featured established works by American composers as well as premiers of new compositions. They included performances of: orchestral works, chamber music, band and wind ensemble music, vocal and chamber music, opera and ballet. The festival concerts were eagerly anticipated by audiences in Rochester until 1971 and were also broadcast regularly over national radio networks from the Eastman Theater. Critics have often observed that over the course of four decades "more music has been played at these concerts than in all the rest of the United States put together." The music author Joseph Machlis also observed that "It is no exaggeration to say that during the 1920s and 1930s no one did more for the cause of American music than Howard Hanson".

Hanson's interest in educating the general public through innovative means became apparent as early as 1938. At this time he engaged the talents of student ensembles at the Eastman School to present Milestones in the History of Music on the radio. This weekly series of programs presented a sweeping survey of the history of Western music which was broadcast locally in Rochester, New York on WHAM and nationally on the NBC Red Network. In recognition of these efforts, the Peabody Award for outstanding service to music was awarded to Hanson, the Eastman School and WHAM in 1946. Hanson also engaged his student ensembles to present a similar series for the CBS radio network which he entitled Milestones in American Music. This series presented orchestral, choral and chamber music composed by eighty two American composers from the mid 19th century to modern times. As Hanson himself indicated this was "the first attempt at a rather complete presentation of the American picture in music."

=== Eastman-Rochester Orchestra ===
Later in 1939, he founded the Eastman-Rochester Orchestra, which consisted of first chair players from the Rochester Philharmonic Orchestra, faculty members from the Eastman School of Music and selected students from the Eastman School. For thirty years from 1939 to 1969 Hanson made over one hundred recordings for RCA Victor, Mercury Records and Columbia Records with the Eastman-Rochester Orchestra, not only of his own works, but also those of other American composers such as: Charles Ives, Wayne Barlow, John Alden Carpenter, Charles Tomlinson Griffes, Alan Hovhaness, Homer Keller, John Knowles Paine, Burrill Phillips, Walter Piston, Bernard Rogers, Roger Sessions, Leo Sowerby and William Grant Still. Hanson estimated that more than 2000 works by over 500 American composers were premiered during his tenure at the Eastman School.

To celebrate the 50th anniversary of the Boston Symphony Orchestra, Serge Koussevitzky commissioned Hanson's Symphony No. 2, the "Romantic", and premiered it on November 28, 1930. This work was to become Hanson's best known. One of its themes is performed at the conclusion of all concerts at the Interlochen Center for the Arts. Now known as the "Interlochen Theme", it is conducted by a student concertmaster after the featured conductor has left the stage. Traditionally, no applause follows its performance. It is also widely known for its use in the final scene and end credits of the 1979 Ridley Scott film Alien.

External images
- Howard Hanson at the piano in 1936 Here on archives.nyphil.org
- Howard Hanson conducting in New York City in 1959 Here on Getty images

In some ways Hanson's opera Merry Mount (1934) may be considered the first fully American opera. It was written by an American composer and an American librettist on an American story, and was premiered with a mostly American cast at the Metropolitan Opera in New York in 1934. The Opera received fifty curtain calls at its Met premiere, a record that still stands. In 1935, he wrote "Three Songs from Drum Taps", based on the poem by Walt Whitman.

Frederick Fennell, conductor of the Eastman Wind Ensemble, described Hanson's first band composition, the 1954 Chorale and Alleluia as "the most awaited piece of music to be written for the wind band in my twenty years as a conductor in this field". Chorale and Alleluia is still a required competition piece for high school bands in the New York State School Music Association's repertoire list.

In 1955, he conducted the Naumburg Orchestral Concerts, in the Naumburg Bandshell, Central Park, in the summer series.

=== "Song of Democracy" ===
By 1957, Hanson was inspired once again by the poetry of Walt Whitman and completed his Song of Democracy to mark the hundredth anniversary of the National Education Association and the fiftieth anniversary of the Music Educator's National Conference. Hanson conducted its official premier with the National Symphony Orchestra in Washington D.C. before an audience of 23,000. This followed an unofficial performance in 1957 for President Eisenhower by Howard University's African-American Chorus which subsequently performed the work in Constitution Hall a month later. By synthesizing his own musical idealism with Whitman's robust optimism, Hanson composed a work which reflects the boundless possibilities of youthful creativity. The work incorporates a clear signature motto to his "Romantic" Symphony during the orchestral prelude as well as a largely harmonic setting for the chorus which culminates in a fervent hymn. Following its premier, Song of Democracy became a particularly favorite composition among all-city high school choruses and promoted the ideal vision of an inclusive democratic society which embodies tolerance and a respect for human rights.

During the 1950s and 1960s Howard Hanson continued to adapt innovative techniques in an effort to educate as large an audience as possible, even as revolutionary changes in mass media emerged in America. For example, he collaborated with the Ford Foundation during this period in order to produce a series of television films on composition. He also served as a member of the Music Advisory Panel of the American National Theatre and Academy along with Virgil Thomson, William Schuman and Milton Katims. This panel consisted of leading composers and academics who evaluated candidates for the Department of State's Cultural Presentations program. Musicians who were accepted into this program represented America's cultural diplomacy initiatives in concert venues throughout the world during the Cold War. In 1955, he conducted a concert in the Naumburg Orchestral Concerts, in the Naumburg Bandshell, Central Park, in the summer series. Later in the 1960s, he also hosted and conducted the Los Angeles Philharmonic in several series of young peoples concerts for school children in the Los Angeles area. In 1960, Hanson also published a book Harmonic Materials of Modern Music (1960). Though not an example of integral music theory, it contained fruitful ideas and analytic algorithms which were incorporated in later theories such as set theory of Allen Forte. The idea of 'modal modulation' (Hanson's term) echoed in the Yuri Kholopov's 'variable mode' doctrine.

External audio
- You may hear Howard Hanson conducting Aaron Copland's Music for the Theatre – Suite in Five Parts for Small Orchestra (1925) with his Eastman-Rochester Symphony Orchestra in 1940 Here on archive.org

=== Institute for American Music ===
Following his retirement as Director of the Eastman School of Music in 1964, Hanson was appointed as the first director of the newly established Institute for American Music at the University of Rochester. In this new role, Hanson continued his efforts to foster a widespread understanding and appreciation of American music through performances, publications and recordings. Operating funds for the institute were largely derived from royalties generated from compositions and recordings which were executed by Hanson during his tenure at the Eastman School. Following his death in 1981, Hanson's wife Peggy assumed his responsibilities at the institute until her death in 1996. It has been observed that nearly every American composer since World War I is indebted in some degree to Howard Hanson for his efforts to educate the public and future generations of professional musicians about American music.

Hanson was elected as a member of the National Institute of Arts and Letters in 1935, President of the Music Teachers' National Association from 1929 to 1930, and President of the National Association of Schools of Music from 1935 to 1939. From 1946 to 1962, he was active in United Nations Educational, Scientific and Cultural Organization (UNESCO). UNESCO commissioned Hanson's Pastorale for Oboe and Piano, and Pastorale for Oboe, Strings, and Harp, for the 1949 Paris conference of the world body.

=== Orchestras ===
During the course of his career Hanson also served as a guest conductor for several leading orchestras including: the New York Philharmonic, the Boston Symphony Orchestra, and the NBC Symphony Orchestra. He was also a frequent conductor of the Rochester Philharmonic Orchestra at the Eastman Theater in Rochester, New York. In addition, he was the founder of the Eastman Philharmonia Orchestra at the Eastman School of Music. This ensemble consisted of elite upperclassmen from the Eastman School of Music and was noted for concertizing throughout the country. Under Hanson's leadership, it was selected to participate in the United States Department of State's international cultural exchange program during the 1961–1962 season. Hanson took the Eastman Philharmonia on a European tour which passed through Paris, Cairo, Moscow, and Vienna, among other cities. The tour showcased the growth of serious American music for Europe and the Middle East. Hanson's performances with the orchestra received critical acclaim in thirty four cities and sixteen countries throughout Europe, the Middle East and Russia.

== Marriage ==
Hanson met Margaret Elizabeth Nelson at her parents' summer home on Lake Chautauqua at the Chautauqua Institution in New York. Hanson dedicated the Serenade for Flute, Harp, and Strings, to her; the piece was his musical marriage proposal, as he could not find the spoken words to propose to her. They married on July 24, 1946, in the same house where they had first met.

== Legacy and honors ==
- Hanson was an initiate of two chapters of Phi Mu Alpha Sinfonia fraternity: the Iota chapter at Northwestern University in 1916, and the Alpha Nu chapter at Eastman in 1928. He was recognized as a national honorary member in 1930, and presented with the Charles E. Lutton Man of Music Award at the national convention in Cincinnati, Ohio in 1954.
- After he composed the Hymn of the Pioneers to celebrate the 300th anniversary of the first Swedish settlement in Delaware, Hanson was selected as a fellow of the Royal Swedish Academy in 1938.
- In 1944, Hanson was awarded the Pulitzer Prize for Symphony No. 4, subtitled Requiem.
- In 1945, he became the first recipient of the Ditson Conductor's Award for his commitment to American music.
- In 1946, Hanson was awarded the George Foster Peabody Award "for outstanding entertainment programming" for a series he presented on the Rochester, New York radio station WHAM in 1945.
- Hanson was elected to the American Philosophical Society in 1950.
- In 1953, Hanson helped to establish the Edward B. Benjamin Prize "for calming and uplifting music" written by Eastman students. Each submitted score was read by Hanson and the Eastman Orchestra. Winners of the Benjamin Prize appeared on Hanson's recording Music for Quiet Listening.
- In 1959, Hanson won the first Lancaster Symphony Orchestra Composer's Award, which is the oldest award of its kind in America and is awarded annually to a contemporary composer by the Lancaster Symphony Orchestra, Lancaster, Pennsylvania (established in 1947). Hanson was a friend and colleague of the Founding Conductor of the Lancaster Symphony Orchestra, the late Louis Vyner.
- In 1960, Hanson published Harmonic Materials of Modern Music: Resources of the Tempered Scale, a book that would lay the foundation for musical set theory. Among the many notions considered was what Hanson called the isomeric relationship, now usually termed Z-relationship.
- Hanson was on the Board of Directors of the Music Educators National Conference from 1960 to 1964.
- Hanson was elected to the American Academy of Arts and Sciences in 1961.
- Hanson's Song of Democracy, on a Walt Whitman text, was performed at the inaugural concert for incoming U.S. President Richard Nixon in 1969. Hanson proudly noted this was the first inaugural concert to feature only American music.
- In recognition of Hanson's achievements, the Eastman Kodak company donated $100,000 worth of stock to the Eastman School of Music in 1976. Hanson stipulated that the gift be used to fund the Institute of American Music.
- Hanson was a Distinguished Nebraskans Award Recipient in 1976.
- During his lifetime, Howard Hanson was the recipient of thirty four honorary doctorate degrees.

== Popular culture ==
Excerpts from Hanson's Second Symphony were used to accompany several exterior sequences and the end credits in the released versions of Ridley Scott's 1979 horror movie Alien without his permission, but the composer decided not to fight it in court—they replaced certain sections of Jerry Goldsmith's original score at the behest of 20th Century Fox. This highlighted music can still be found on all DVD, Blu-Ray and 4K versions of Alien. The version used in the film is the 1967 recording by the National Philharmonic Orchestra, conducted by Charles Gerhardt. Apparently, Hanson told Gerhardt that, of all the available recordings, he found Gerhardt's to be the most 'sympathetic'.

== Death ==
Hanson died at Strong Memorial Hospital in Rochester, New York at the age of 84. He was survived by his wife Margaret Elizabeth Nelson.

== Compositional style ==
Hanson's music has been described as part of the Neo-Romantic movement in music which endeavored to continue the traditions of the Romantic era into the 20th century. His Symphony No. 2, for example, has been cited as a Neo-Romantic manifesto. He has also been identified by critics as an "American Neoromantic composer par excellence" whose compositions were conceived in the grand romantic tradition of Antonin Dvorák. In addition, his early symphonies have been characterized as "splendidly effusive, gorgeously orchestrated, rich in harmonic texture".

It should also be noted, however, that Hanson's compositions also incorporated experimentation with modern musical idioms. Many of the passages in his works are based upon modal scales which call to mind Gregorian chants. In addition, he made extensive use of extended tertian chords, motoric ostinati in rapid passages and alternating triadic chords. Several of his liturgical and choral compositions also reflected themes derived from Swedish Lutheran hymns. Elements of Nordic austerity identified in his music have also prompted some observers to compare him to Jean Sibelius.

It has also been noted that one of Hanson's hallmarks as a composer is his utilization of melodic lines which flow seamlessly in a manner which is almost improvisational, unpretentious, and very American. The composer and critic David Owens indicated that Hanson clearly embraced the use of tonal beauty in his compositions in order to give expression to a conservative musical ideal. By carefully blending his use of tonality with a masterful understanding of orchestral depth, Hanson succeeded in producing compositions which Owen described as being both memorable and compelling.

While reviewing Hanson's legacy in 1981, the music critic Donal Henehan wrote in the New York Times that Hanson's music is representative of the post-Romantic style in the tradition of Jean Sibelius. He also noted that, "for more than a half century (Hanson) stood like Horatio at the bridge, beating back the faddists, the avant-gardists, and the purveyors of what he once termed "modern musical realism" and that the music found in his Nordic and Romantic Symphonies "exudes a sincerity and concern for craft that lend it enough legitimacy to warrant occasional revival and reassessment". He also recounted Hanson's disdain for music which is "too cerebral" and his assertion that emotional expression is the ultimate objective of any successful musical performance. This "traditionalist" philosophy of music became the hallmark of a conservative '"Eastman School" of composers which included: William Bergsma, Robert Moffat Palmer, Burrill Phillips, Gardner Read, and Bernard Rogers.

Perhaps Hanson described his music best when he portrayed it as metaphorically "springing from the soil of the American midwest. It is music of the plains rather than of the city and reflects, I believe, something of the broad prairies of my native Nebraska." For in the final analysis, Hanson believed that, "To the artist, to the musician, is given the task of creating and expressing beauty--of sensitizing the souls of men...."

== Works ==
External audio
- You may hear Howard Hanson's Serenade for Flute, Harp and Strings Op. 35 conducted by Eugene Ormandy and the Philadelphia Orchestra in 1947 on archive.org

Included among Hanson's compositions are the following works:

=== Opera ===
- Merry Mount (1933)

=== Orchestral ===
- Symphonic Prelude (1916)
- Symphonic Legend (1917)
- Symphonic Rhapsody (1919)
- Before the Dawn, Symphonic Poem (1920)
- Exaltation, Symphonic Poem, Op. 20 (1920)
- Symphony No. 1 in E minor, Op. 21 ("Nordic") (1922)
- Lux aeterna, Symphonic Poem for Orchestra with Viola Obbligato, Op. 24 (1923–26)
- Pan and the Priest, Symphonic Poem with Piano Obbligato, Op. 26 (1926)
- Organ Concerto, Op. 27 (1926)
- Symphony No. 2 in D♭ major Op. 30 ("Romantic") (1930)
- Suite from the Opera "Merry Mount," Op. 31 (1938)
- Symphony No. 3 Op. 33 (1936–38)
- Symphony No. 4 Op. 34 ("Requiem") (1943; won Pulitzer Prize)
- Serenade for Flute, Harp and Strings Op. 35 (1945)
- Pastorale for Oboe, Harp and Strings Op. 38 (1949)
- Fantasy-Variations on a Theme of Youth (1951)
- Symphony No. 5 Op. 43, "Sinfonia Sacra" (1955)
- Elegy in Memory of Serge Koussevitzky Op. 44 (1956)
- Mosaics (1957)
- Summer Seascape (1958)
- Bold Island Suite (1961)
- For the First Time (1963)
- Symphony No. 6 (1967)
- Dies Natalis (1967)
- Symphony No. 7 ("A Sea Symphony") (1977)
- Ballet Nymphs and Satyr (1979)

=== Choral ===
- A Prayer of the Middle Ages
- North and West, Symphonic poem with Chorus Obligato (1923)
- The Lament for Beowulf, Op. 25 (1925)
- Heroic Elegy for wordless chorus and orchestra (1927)
- Three Songs from Drum Taps (Walt Whitman), Op. 32 for baritone, chorus & orchestra (1935)
- The Cherubic Hymn, Op. 37 for chorus and orchestra (1949)
- How Excellent Thy Name Op. 41, (1952)
- Song of Democracy, Op. 44 (1957) for wind ensemble, string orchestra and SATB Choir
- Song of Human Rights, Op. 49 (1963) (text from the Preamble of the Universal Declaration of Human Rights)
- The One Hundred Fiftieth Psalm (Praise Ye The Lord) for chorus and orchestra (1965)
- The One Hundred Twenty First Psalm for baritone, chorus and orchestra (1968)
- Streams in the Desert for chorus and orchestra (1969)
- The Mystic Trumpeter for narrator, chorus and orchestra (1970)
- Lumen in Christo for chorus and orchestra (1974)
- New Land, New Covenant oratorio (1976)

=== Band ===
- Centennial March (1966)
- Chorale and Alleluia (1954)
- Dies Natalis II (1972)
- Laude
- Variations on an Ancient Hymn

=== Concertante ===
- Concerto for Piano and Orchestra in G Major, Op. 36 (1948)
- Concerto for organ, harp & strings in C, Op 22/3 (1921)
- Summer Seascape No.2 for Viola and String Orchestra (1965)

=== Chamber ===
- Quintet in F minor, for 2 Violins, Cello and Piano (1916)
- Concerto da Camera in C Minor for Piano and String Quartet (1917), Op. 7
- String Quartet (1923), Op. 23
- Serenade for Flute, Harp and Strings (1946), Op. 35
- Pastorale for Oboe and Piano (1949), reorchestrated as alternative Pastorale for Oboe, Harp and Strings (1950), both Op. 38
- Fantasy Variations on a Theme of Youth (1951)
- Elegy for Viola and String Quartet (1966)

=== Keyboard ===
- Poèmes érotiques, Op. 9
- Sonata in A Minor, Op. 11
- Three Miniatures for Piano, Op. 12
- Symphonic Rhapsody, Op. 14
- Three Etudes, Op. 18
- Two Yuletide Pieces, Op. 19

=== Music theory ===
Harmonic Materials of Modern Music (1960), Irvington.

== Discography ==
- A boxed set of Howard Hanson conducting the Eastman Philharmonia in his symphonies, piano concerto, etc., is available on the Mercury label. A companion set from Mercury, a compilation of Hanson conducting lesser known American works, is also available.
- His Symphony No. 2 is probably his most recorded work. In addition to the composer's own recording, those by Erich Kunzel, Leonard Slatkin, Gerard Schwarz and Charles Gerhardt are also popular. Also, the Interlochen Center for the Arts uses part of this symphony as its theme (see detailed explanation above).
- Naxos Records released a recording of the 1934 world premiere performance of Merry Mount in 1999. For copyright reasons it was not made available in the United States.

Recordings by Howard Hanson conducting his own compositions with the Eastman-Rochester Orchestra include:

- Elegy in Memory of Serge Koussevitzky Op. 44 – Mercury Records (SR90150) – Hanson conducting the Eastman-Rochester Orchestra (1957)
- The Lament for Beowulf Op. 25 – Mercury Records (SR90192) – Hanson conducting the Eastman-Rochester Orchestra (1958)
- Song of Democracy Op. 44 – Mercury Records (#432 0008-2) – Hanson conducting the Eastman-Rochester Orchestra (1957)
- Symphony No. 1 in E Minor Op. 21 (Nordic) – Mercury Records (#432 008-2) – Hanson conducting the Eastman- Rochester Orchestra (1960)
- Symphony No. 2 in D-Flat Major Op. 30 (Romantic) – Mercury Records (#432 0008-2)- Hanson conducting the Eastman-Rochester Orchestra (1958)
- Symphony No. 3 Op. 33 – Mercury Records (SR90449) – Hanson conducting the Eastman-Rochester Orchestra (1963)

== Publications ==
Included among Hanson's scholarly works are the following peer reviewed publications:

- Hanson, Howard (1934), "Music and American Youth", Music Educators Journal
- Hanson, Howard (1935), "Music In Its Highest Fulfillment", Music Educators Journal
- Hanson, Howard (1937), "American Music for American Youth", Music Educators Journal
- Hanson, Howard (1941), "The Democratization of Music", Music Educators Journal
- Hanosn, Howard (1943), "On Musicians", Music Educators Journal
- Hanson, Howard (1957), 'Encouraging the Musically Gifted (continued)", Gifted Child Quarterly
- Hanson, Howard (1948), "The Scope of the Music Education Program", Music Educators Journal
- Hanson, Howard (1957), "The Arts in an Age of Science", Music Educators Journal
- Hanson, Howard (1958), "Music Looks Forward", Music Educators Journal
- Hanson, Howard (1959), "Music Education Faces the Scientific Age", Music Educators Journal
- Hanson, Howard (1960), "Cultivating a Climate for Creativity", Music Educators Journal
- Hanson, Howard (1962), "The Challenge of the Modern Role of Arts", American String Teacher
- Hanosn, Howard (1971), 'Wanted: A Music Survival Kit: The Arts Crisis Courts Disaster in the Seventies" Music Educators Journal

== Notable students ==
During the course of his forty-year tenure as Director of the Eastman School of Music, Howard Hanson also served as a member of the composition faculty. Several of his students won Pulitzer Prizes for Music, including Dominick Argento, John La Montaine, and Robert Ward. In addition, several of his students enjoyed widespread recognition as composers, including Wayne Barlow, Jack Beeson, William Bergsma, Ulysses Kay, Kent Kennan, Peter Mennin, Louis Mennini, W. Francis McBeth, Robert Moffat Palmer, Burrill Phillips, Gardner Read, and Margaret Vardell Sandresky.

== Archive ==
- The Howard Hanson Collection at the Eastman School of Music – includes archived scores, compositions, arrangements, letters, essays and recordings by Howard Hanson within the Sibley Music Library- Ruth T. Watanabe Special Collections.

== Sources ==
- Autry, Philip Earl The Published Solo Piano Music Of Howard Hanson: An Analysis For Teaching And Performing (U. M. I. 1996)
- Cohen, Allen Laurence (2004). Howard Hanson in Theory and Practice. Westport, CT.: Praeger. ISBN 0-313-32135-3.
- Goss, Madeleine Modern Music-Makers: Contemporary American Composers (Greenwood Press, Publishers. 1952)
- Hanson, Howard (2024). A Romantic Symphony: the Autobiography of Howard Hanson. Rochester, NY: Meliora Press. ISBN 9781648251030.
- Perone, James Howard Hanson: A Bio-Bibliography (Westport, CT: Greenwood Press, 1993)
- Machlis, Joseph American Composers of Our Time (Thomas Y. Crowell. 1963)
- Simmons, Walter Voices in the Wilderness: Six American Neo-Romantic Composers (Lanham, MD: Scarecrow Press, Inc., 2006)
- Shetler, Donald J. In Memoriam Howard Hanson (Music Educators Natl. 1984)
- Williams, David Russell Conversations with Howard Hanson (Arkadelphia, Arkansas: Delta Publications, 1988)
- 20th Century Fox Home Entertainment, The Beast Within: The Making of Alien (2004)

Preceded by Alf Klingenberg	Director of the Eastman School of Music; 1924–1964	Succeeded by Walter Hendl
Preceded by Raymond Wilson (Acting Director)	Director of the Eastman School of Music; 1924–1964	Succeeded by Walter Hendl
