= Grimson (musical family) =

Musical family active in the UK from the 1870s onwards

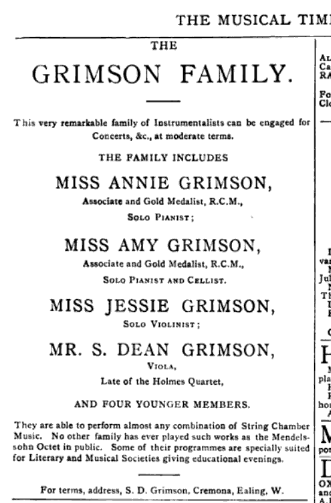
Advertisement from The Musical Times, multiple 1895 issues

The Grimson family was a family of classical musicians active in London from the early 1870s.

Samuel Dean Grimson (1841 – 7 April 1922) was a violinist and viola player of orchestral and chamber music. He played with the Holmes Quartet and was the author of A First Book for the Violin, published in 1881. He married Maria Mary Anne Bonarius (1848 – 1896) and (from circa 1890) they lived at 53 Mount Park Road in Ealing. A portrait of Grimson with his violin, painted in 1914 by Frank Brooks, is owned by the Royal Society of Musicians of Great Britain.

All seven of his surviving children (an eighth, Dean, died as an infant) were musicians who were trained by their father and then went on to study at the Royal College of Music. On January 21, 1896 at the Queen's (small) Hall, Grimson and his seven children performed Mendelssohn's Octet as a family. The concert became an annual event for several years, with the family performing Gade's Octet in 1897 and Svendsen's Octet in 1898.

- Annie Maria Grimson (later Wallis) (4 September 1870 – 9 October 1949) studied piano and violin, and later became a pupil of Tobias Matthay. She composed orchestral and chamber music, some of which was performed at the South Place Concerts, Conway Hall. She wrote a symphony (now thought lost) at the age of 17. Other works include the Fidelité Waltz for full orchestra, the Nocturne for violin and piano (1892, published Augener & Co), and the Canzona for violin and piano (1898, published C. Woodhouse). In the Summer of 1912 she married Joseph Wallis, a retired architect, aged 78, who died the following year.
- Amy Jane Grimson (11 September 1872 – 23 January 1935) was a cellist and pianist who trained at the Royal College of Music from the age of 14, and later with Tobias Matthay. For a while she played with the Rev. E. H. Moberley's Ladies Orchestra, and as a soloist. She lived in Sunbury.
- Jessie Grimson (later Mason) (26 November 1873 – 19 October 1954) won a scholarship to the Royal College of Music in 1889, where she studied violin with August Wilhelmj, Henry Holmes and Richard Gompertz. She was one of the first women (along with Rebecca Clarke) to play in Henry Wood's Queen's Hall Orchestra. Her debut as a soloist took place at the Crystal Palace Concerts in 1896 where she performed Spohr's Violin Concerto in A Minor Op.47. She formed and led the Grimson Quartet, in which all the other players were male. Frank Bridge played second violin after leaving college, and the Quartet put on the first performance of Bridge's Three Idylls in 1907. Her husband Edward Mason, whom she married in 1905, was a cellist and also played with the quartet. (He was killed serving in the War on 9 May 1915). She retired from performing in 1927 but continued to appear occasionally into the 1930s. Like her older sisters Annie and Amy, she was long associated with music making at Conway Hall. One of her pupils was Nona Liddell.
- Ellen Elizabeth Grimson (later Woodroffe) (1877 – 8 April 1941) was a concert pianist, sometimes referred to as Nellie Grimson. She was interested in Theosophy, and married the British orientalist John Woodroffe in 1902.
- Samuel Bonarius Grimson (7 January 1879 – 29 November 1955) was an orchestral (London Symphony Orchestra) and concert violinist who also composed several songs. His performing career was ended by injuries sustained while serving in Italy towards the end of the War. After the war he became a collector of art and musical instruments. In 1920 he published Modern Violin Playing (with Cecil Forsyth). Samuel Grimson moved to America, where he married twice: to sculptor and author Malvina Hoffman on 4 June 1924 (divorced 1936); and then to the psychoanalyst Bettina Warburg. He forged a new career as a research scientist in colour cinema and television, and died in New York.
- Robert Alfred Grimson (22 February 1881 – 30 January 1953) trained at the Royal College of Music and later in Berlin. His was a cellist, violist and organist. He taught at the Basle Conservatory of Music, later returning to the UK, where he married Dorothy Astley Cottrell in 1927.
- Harold Grimson (April–May 1882 – 1 December 1917), was a violinist who studied with Émile Sauret, Wilhelmj and Joachim. He was known professionally as Harold Bonarius, performing as a soloist and as leader of the Torquay Orchestra. He enlisted early in the War and was killed in action during the Battle of Cambrai on 1 December 1917.

== Other 19th century musical families ==
- Adolf Borsdorf, horn player, was the father of three horn playing sons, Oskar, Francis and Emil, who all became professionals. The younger Borsdorfs changed their surname to Bradley because of anti-German sentiment.
- The Brains. Alfred Edwin Brain Sr. was a horn player. Two of his children, Alfred and Aubrey became great horn players. Aubrey married Marion Beeley, a singer at Covent Garden. His two sons were the world famous horn player Dennis Brain and Leonard Brain, an oboist.
- The Carters. The brothers John Carter (1832-1916), George Carter (1835-1890), Henry Carter (1837-1901) and William Carter (1838-1917) were all organist composers, taught by their father who was organist at St Matthew's, Bethnal Green.
- The Chaplins. Sisters Eleanor Mary (or Nellie), pianist and harpsichordist; Kate Chaplin, violinist and player of the viola d'amore; and Mabel Chaplin, cellist and player of the viola da gamba formed The Chaplin Trio, known for contributing to the revival of early music from 1889 until the late 1920s.
- Eugène Goossens (père) was the father of the conductor and violinist Eugène Goossens (fils) and grandfather of the conductor and composer Sir Eugene Goossens, the harpists Marie and Sidonie Goossens, the horn player Adolphe Goossens and the oboist Léon Goossens.
- The Hambourgs. Pianist Michael Hambourg (1855–1916) was the father of the internationally famous pianist Mark Hambourg and his brothers Boris Hambourg (cello), Jan Hambourg (violin) and Clement Hambourg (piano). Mark Hambourg's uncle Alexander Hambourg was also a conductor and his cousin Charles Hambourg (1895–1979) was a cellist and conductor. Mark's daughter Michal Augusta Hambourg (1919–2004) also became a pianist.
- The Harrisons. Four sisters: May (violin), Beatrice (cello), Monica (mezzo-soprano) and Margaret (violin). Inspired by the many performances of Brahms' Double Concerto by May and Beatrice, Delius wrote his Double Concerto for the sisters, which they performed in 1920.
- The Hopkins’. Brothers Edward Hopkins (c1778-1866) and George Hopkins were both early clarinet players. Edward's sons were the organists Edward (at Armagh Cathedral) and John Larkin Hopkins. George's sons were Edward John Hopkins, John Hopkins (born 1822, organist at Rochester Cathedral) and Thomas Hopkins (organist at St Saviour's Church, York, died 1893).
- The Lushingtons: Jane Lushington and her three daughters, Kitty, Margaret and Susan, the subject of a painting exhibited by Arthur Hughes in 1883, The Home Quartet: Mrs Vernon Lushington and her Children.
- The Mukles. May Mukle (1880-1963) was a cellist. Her father was a mechanical musical instrument maker. Her sisters Anne (pianist), Lillian (trumpet), Flora, Louisa, and Clara were also musicians. Nora Mukle (niece of Mukle sisters?) was a double bass player, wife of Vernon Elliott.
- The Novellos. Vincent Novello and his wife, Mary Sabilla (née Hehl), had eleven children. His son Joseph Alfred Novello was a singer who established the music publisher Novello & Co and founded The Musical Times in 1844. Five of his daughters survived to adulthood, four of them became gifted singers. Clara Novello was a soprano, one of the best known vocalists in opera and oratorio, and on the concert stage, from 1833 onward.
- The Simonsens of St. Kilda. French soprano Fanny Simonsen and her Danish husband, the violinist and conductor Martin Simonsen. In the wider family, active in Australia and New Zealand from 1865, there were 12 professional singers and three violinists, including the world famous lyric soprano Frances Alda.
- The Walenns. The scientist William Henry Walenn and his musical wife Skene Charlotte raised a family of 15, including many professional musicians. Herbert Walenn was a cellist and professor at the Royal Academy of Music; Charles Walenn was a singer; another son was an organist, and Gerald Walenn and Dorothea were violinists. Arthur Walenn, Dorothea Walenn, Herbert and Gerald formed the Walenn String Quartet in the 1890s.
- The Winterbottoms. A family of military band musicians active in the British forces in the nineteenth and early 20th centuries. The founder of the dynasty was John Winterbottom (1795 – 1855) and there were five bandmaster sons; Thomas, William, John, Henry and Ammon; and (through Ammon) two grandsons, Frank and Charles.

== See also ==
- List of musical families (classical music)
- Fawcett (musical family)
