= The Oxford and Cambridge Magazine =

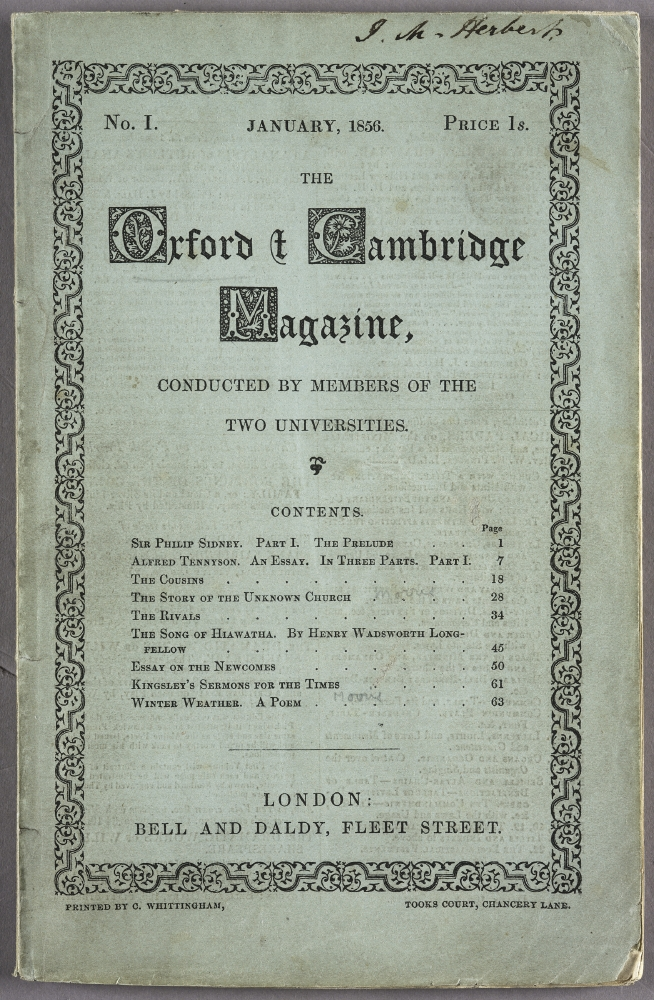
- Front cover of first issue
- Editor: William Morris, William Fulford
- Categories: Literary Magazine
- Frequency: Monthly
- Founded: 1856
- Country: United Kingdom
- Language: English

The Oxford and Cambridge Magazine was a periodical magazine of essays, poems, reviews, and stories, that appeared in 1856 as twelve monthly issues.

The magazine was founded by a "set" of seven undergraduate students including William Morris (1834–1896), Edward Burne-Jones (1833–1898), William Fulford (1831–1882), Richard Watson Dixon (1833–1900), who later was to become secretary of Thomas Carlyle, Wilfred Lucas Heeley (1833–1876), who later became a civil servant in India, Vernon Lushington (1832-1912), later the Deputy Judge Advocate General and Cormell Price (1835–1910), later headmaster of several English Public Schools. Heeley and Vernon Lushington were from Cambridge University, the others were all from Oxford University. Other contributors included Godfrey Lushington and Dante Gabriel Rossetti. The magazine was largely financed by William Morris.

== Prehistory ==
The first plans for the magazine were made in the summer of 1855, when a group of undergraduates of Oxford University, that called themselves "The Brotherhood," decided to found and conduct a monthly magazine with substantial value. "The first suggestion of this magazine was made by Dixon to Morris. It was taken up eagerly by the others." Morris, who was 22 of age then, and Burne-Jones met Wilfred Heeley (1833-1876), who was then a student at Trinity College, Cambridge. In November 1955 negotiations with the publishers Bell and Daldy were started.

Although most of the members of the group, including Morris, came to the university with a plan to enter the clergy, their plans changed around 1856. For instance Morris and Burne-Jones decided to become artists, while "walking together on the quays of Havre late into the August night," on a trip to France in the summer of 1855.

One of the sources of inspiration for the magazine was The Germ, the periodical that was intended to spread the ideas about art of the Pre-Raphaelite Brotherhood, but that only appeared for a short period in 1850. But the aims of Morris and his friends were more secular. They saw the magazine "as an agent of social change, rather than a vehicle for espousing specific aesthetic theories." "The Oxford and Cambridge Magazine coupled the aesthetic revolt of William Holman Hunt, John Everett Millais, and Dante Rossetti with the social dissatisfaction of Carlyle and Ruskin to become a periodical which despite its short existence, changed the direction of Pre-Raphaelite thinking and played an influential role in shaping social ideas and attitudes in the latter half of the nineteenth century."

The printer of the Magazine was: Chiswick Press.

The price per issue was 1 Shilling.

== Contents ==
The magazine existed one year. In that year the total number of contributors was 14 (14 men and 1 woman). The total number of contributions was 69. Among that number were 16 short stories (of which eight were written by Morris), 17 poems (five by Morris) and 19 essays on literature, 2 on art, 6 on society and politics, 2 on history, 1 on religion, 1 on philosophy and 5 on miscellaneous topics. So "although there was an honest effort to cover many subjects, the prevailing interest of the Brotherhood was literary in nature."

None of the contributions was signed (two excepted). Fleming gives complete lists of contributors for every issue. But the exact origin of some of the contributions is not always (exactly) known, for instance in the fifth issue (May).

The first issue was edited by Morris, but all later issues were edited by Fulford.

== First issue: January 1856 ==
The first number of the Oxford and Cambridge Magazine, conducted by Members of the two Universities appeared on Jan. 1, 1856. It had 64 pages and was first printed in 750 copies. Later 250 copies were added. Only one of the articles was signed.

The first issue contained the following articles:

- 'Sir Philip Sidney. Part I. The Prelude.' p. 1–7. This essay about Philip Sidney was written by Wilfred Heeley, the main Cambridge contributor to the magazine. The essay has parts, written as a first-person narrative, although the name of the writer is not mentioned in the magazine. The second part of the essay was published in the March issue of the Magazine.
- 'Alfred Tennyson. An Essay. In Three Parts.' p. 7–18. First part of three-part essay (2nd part in February issue of the Magazine; 3rd part in March issue) written by William Fulford. This essay excited more interest than any other contribution to the first issue of the Magazine.
- 'The Cousins.' p. 18–28. This short story was written by Edward Burne-Jones.
- 'The Story of the Unknown Church.' p. 28–33. Short story written by William Morris.
- 'The Rivals.' p. 34–45. Short story by Richard Watson Dixon.
- 'The Song of Hiawatha. By Henry Wadsworth Longfellow.' p. 45–49. Review by Henry J. Macdonald.
- 'Essay on the Newcomes.' p. 50–61. Essay written by Edward Burne-Jones.
- 'Kingsley's Sermons for the Times.' p. 61–62. Review written by Wilfred Heeley. This was the only text in the issue that was signed: "W.L.H."
- 'Winter Weather. A Poem' p. 63–64. By William Morris.

== 2nd issue: February 1856 ==
The second issue also holds 64 pages. It contained seven articles on:

- 'The Barrier Kingdoms.' p. 65–72. An essay by Richard Watson Dixon, dealing with the Crimean War. A one-quarter size page was inserted, holding the text: "The article on 'The Barrier Kingdoms' was in type before the news arrived of a near prospect of peace. The new aspect of the question will be discussed in our next number.-Ed."
- 'Alfred Tennyson. An Essay. In Three Parts. Part. II.' p. 73–81. The second part of the essay by William Fulford, started in the first issue.
- 'A Story of the North.' p. 81–99. Written by Edward Burne-Jones.
- 'The Churches of North France.' p. 99–110. This essay, written by William Morris apparently was intended to be first in a series. It has a subtitle "No. 1 – Shadows of Amiens." No further parts were published.
- 'The Two Partings. A Tale.' p. 110–115. A story, written by William Fulford.
- Shakespeare's Minor Poems.' p. 115–127. An essay, written by Cormell Price.
- 'In Youth I Died.' p. 127–128. A poem by William Fulford.

== 3rd issue: March 1856 ==
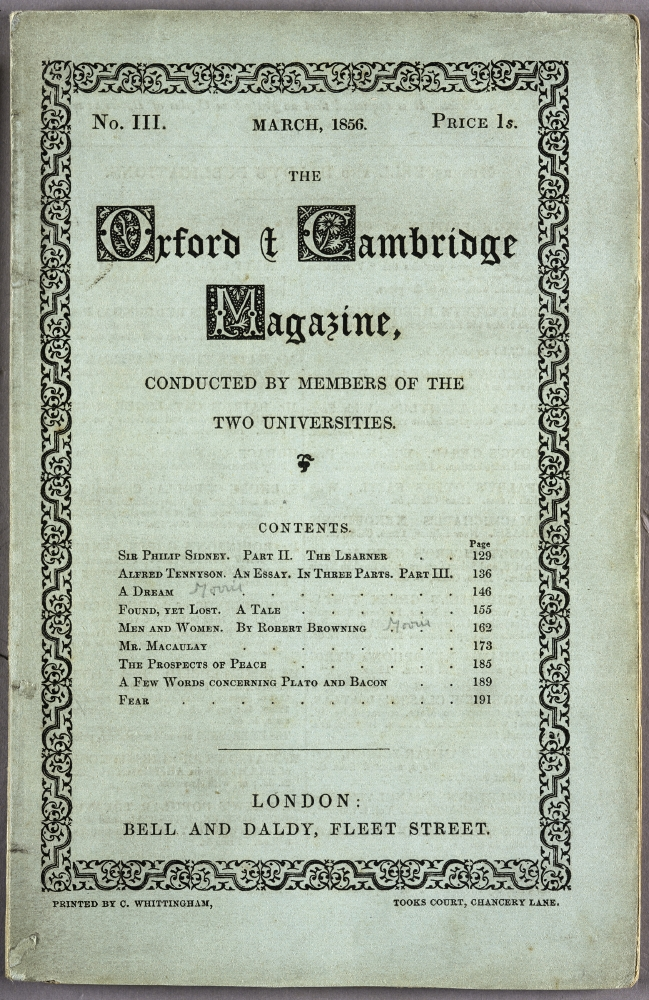
Front cover of 3rd issue, March 1856

The third issue again holds 64 pages. It contained nine articles on:

- 'Sir Philip Sidney. Part II. The Learner.' p. 129–136. The second part of the essay about Philip Sidney, written by Wilfred Heeley, and started in the first issue.
- 'Alfred Tennyson. An Essay. In Three Parts. Part III.' p. 136–145. The third and final part of the essay by William Fulford, started in the first issue.
- 'A Dream.' p. 146–155. A short story written by William Morris.
- 'Found, yet lost. A Tale.' p. 155–162. Short story by William Fulford.
- 'Men and Women. By Robert Browning.' p. 162–172. Review by William Morris.
- 'Mr. Macaulay.' p. 173–184. Essay / review by Wilfred Heeley of Thomas Macaulay's The History of England from the Accession of James the Second.
- 'The Prospects of Peace.' p. 185–189. Essay by Richard Watson Dixon on the Crimean war.
- 'A Few Words concerning Plato and Bacon.' p. 189–191. Essay by William Fulford.
- 'Fear.' p. 191–192. Poem by William Fulford.

== 4th issue: April 1856 ==
64 pages. Five articles:

- 'Carlyle.' p. 193–211. First part of the five-part essay by Vernon Lushington about Thomas Carlyle. Other parts were published in May, June, November and December.
- 'Mr. Ruskin's New Volume.' p. 212–225. Review by Edward Burne-Jones of the third volume of John Ruskin's Modern Painters.
- 'Frank's Sealed Letter.' p. 225–234. A short story by William Morris.
- 'Oxford.' p. 234–257. Essay by Godfrey Lushington.
- 'Remembrance.' p. 258. Poem by William Fulford.

== 5th issue: May 1856 ==
64 pages. Nine articles:

- 'Prometheus.' p. 259–264. Essay by Lewis Campbell.
- 'Unhealthy Employments.' p. 265–271. Essay by Cormell Price and Charles Joseph Faulkner.
- 'The Sacrifice. A Tale.' p. 271–280. A short story by Georgiana MacDonald (who would later marry Edward Burne-Jones). She was fifteen, when she wrote this contribution to the Magazine. The story is thought to be (at least partially) biographic in character.
- 'Shakespeare's Troilus and Cressida.' p. 280–292. An essay by William Fulford, possibly co-written with Annie Scott Hill (1837-1902), the wife of George Birkbeck Norman Hill.
- 'Carlyle.' p. 292–310. The second part of the essay by Lushington, started in the April issue.
- 'A Night in a Cathedral.' p. 310–316. A short story, that was probably written by William Fulford.
- 'On Popular Lectures, Considered as an Irregular Channel of National Education.' p. 316–319. First part of an essay by Bernard Cracroft.
- 'Riding Together.' p. 320–321. A poem by William Morris, reprinted in 1858 in The Defense of Guenevere and Other Poems.
- 'The Suitor of Low Degree.' p. 321–322. A poem by William Fulford.

== 6th issue: June 1856 ==
64 pages. Five articles:

- 'Thackeray and Currer Bell.' p. 323–335. Essay by Bernard Cracroft.
- 'Carlyle.' p. 336–352. The third part of the essay by Lushington, started in the April issue.
- 'Ruskin and the Quarterly.' p. 353–361. Essay by Edward Burne-Jones (probably assisted by William Morris).
- 'Froude's History of England.' p. 362–388. Review by Wilfred Heeley.
- 'The Singing of the Poet.' p. 388. A poem by William Fulford.

== 7th issue: July 1856 ==
64 pages. Six articles:

- 'On the Life and Character of Marshal St. Arnaud.' p. 389–402. Essay about the Crimean War by a Robert Campbell.
- 'Gertha's Lovers.' p. 403–417. First part of a short story by William Morris.
- 'A Study in Shakespeare.' p. 417–441. This essay was probably written by Annie Scott Hill and William Fulford.
- 'Lancashire and "Mary Barton".' p. 441–451. An essay by Cormell Price in which he discusses poverty, overpopulation and collective bargaining, whilst referring to the novels of Elizabeth Gaskell.
- 'To the English Army before Sebastopol.' p. 451–452. A poem by William Fulford.
- 'Hands.' p. 452. A poem by William Morris.

== 8th issue: August 1856 ==
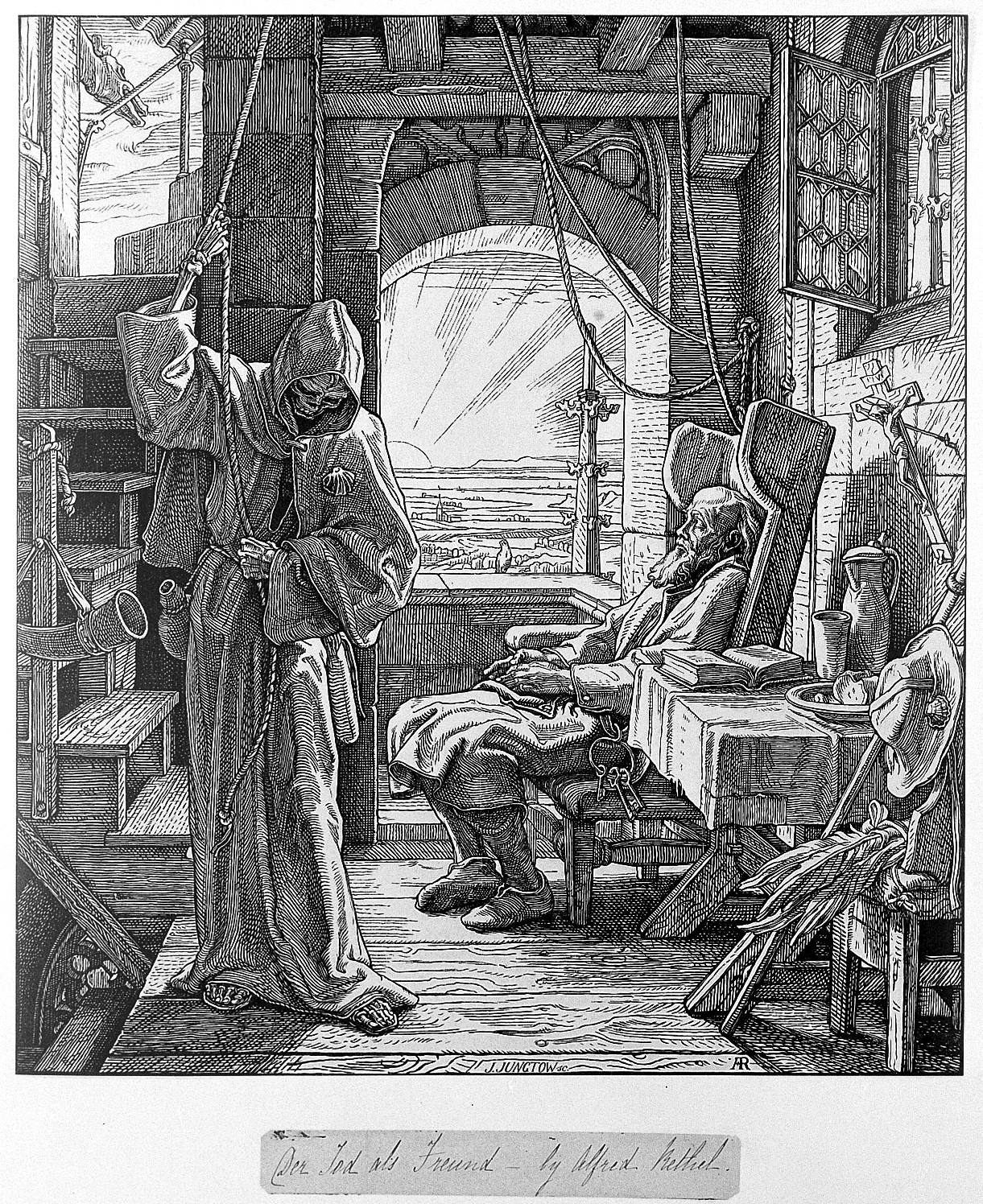
'Death as a Friend,' wood-engraving by Jungtow after Alfred Rethel The original engraving was described by Morris in the August issue of the Magazine.

According to Fleming, this issue is probably the most important of the twelve. It has the first contribution by Dante Gabriel Rossetti, an article by Morris on visual art, and an article by Vernon Lushington, which also discussed paintings. Again it contained 64 pages. It held seven articles:

- 'On Popular Lectures, considered as an irregular Channel of National Education.' p. 453–462. The second part of the essay by Bernard Cracroft, started in the fifth issue.
- 'Woman, her Duties, Education and Position.' p. 462–477. An essay by William Fulford.
- '"Death the Avenger" and "Death the Friend".' p. 477–479. A short essay by William Morris about two engravings of Alfred Rethel.
- 'Two Pictures.' p. 479–488. Essay by Vernon Lushington about 'Dante's Dream on the Day of the Death of Beatrice' by Dante Gabriel Rossetti, and about 'The Last of England' by Ford Madox Brown.
- 'Svend and his Brethren.' p. 488–499. Short story by William Morris.
- 'Gertha's Lovers.' p. 499–512. The second part of the story by William Morris, started in the July-issue.
- 'The Burden of Nineveh.' p. 512–516. A poem by Dante Gabriel Rossetti; the first contribution of "DGR" to the Magazine. It was again published in 1870 in Rossetti's Poems (p. 21f).

Two cancel leaves were printed to correct errors in the August issue.

== 9th issue: September 1856 ==
The ninth issue of 64 pages contained 8 texts:

- 'Robert Herrick.' p. 517–530. An essay by William Aldis Wright about the 17th-century poet Robert Herrick.
- 'Lindenborg Pool.' p. 530–534. Short story by William Morris.
- 'Cavalay. A Chapter of a Life.' p. 535–548. First part of a short story by William Fulford.
- 'Alexander Smith.' p. 548–558. Essay by William Fulford, about the Scottish poet Alexander Smith.
- 'The Work of Young Men in the Present Age.' p. 558–564. Although there is some uncertainty about the author of this essay, Fleming assumes that Cormell Price wrote it; but William Fulford might also be the writer.
- 'The Hollow Land. A Tale.' p. 565–577. First part of a short story by William Morris.
- 'The Chapel in Lyoness. A Poem.' p. 577–579. Poem by William Morris.
- 'A Year Ago. A Poem.' p. 580. Poem by William Fulford.

== 10th issue: October 1856 ==
The tenth issue contained 64 pages and 6 articles:

- 'Twelfth Night; or What You Will. A Study in Shakespeare.' p. 581–605. The third essay of William Fulford and Annie Scott Hill on Shakespeare.
- 'The Sceptic and the Infidel.' p. 605–620. Essay by Bernard Cracroft.
- 'Cavalay. A Chapter of a Life. Part II.' p. 620–632. Second part of the short story by William Fulford.
- 'The Hollow Land. A Tale.' p. 632–641. Second part of the short story by William Morris.
- 'Roger's Table Talk.' p. 641–644. A (quite negative) review by William Fulford of Recollections of the Table Talk of Samuel Rogers (1856) by the Scottish writer Alexander Dyce.
- 'Pray but one Prayer for us. A Poem.' p. 644. Untitled poem by William Morris.

== 11th issue: November 1856 ==
The eleventh issue contained 72 pages and 6 articles:

- 'The Sceptic and the Infidel.' p. 645–663. The second and last part of the essay by Bernard Cracroft, started in the October issue.
- 'Cavalay. A Chapter of a Life. Part II.' p. 664–676. The third part of the short story by William Fulford, started in the September issue.
- 'The Druid and the Maiden.' p. 676–697. Short story by an unknown writer.
- 'Carlyle as a Writer. Chapter IV.' p. 697–712. The fourth part of the essay by Lushington, started in the April issue.
- 'The Blessed Damozel.' p. 713–715. The well-known poem by Dante Gabriel Rossetti. This was a version that differed slightly from the one, published for the first time in 1850 in The Germ.
- 'Childhood.' p. 716. A poem by William Fulford.

This issue also holds an insert with an advertisement for photographic portraits of Thomas Carlyle and Alfred Tennyson, to be bound along with the Magazine.

== 12th issue: December 1856 ==
The final twelfth issue contained 60 pages and 5 articles:

- 'Recent Poems and Plays.' p. 717–732. A review by John Nichol of England in Time of War (Sydney Dobell 1856) and of Within and Without (George MacDonald 1855).
- 'Golden Wings.' p. 733–742. Short story by William Morris.
- 'Carlyle. Chapter V.' p. 743–771. The last part of the essay by Lushington, started in the April issue.
- 'The Staff and Scrip.' p. 771–775. A poem by Dante Gabriel Rossetti.
- 'The Porch of Life.' p. 775–776. A poem by Georgiana MacDonald.

A title page and a three pages table of contents were added between pages 770 and 771.

== Sources ==
- Fleming, Patrick C. (2012). "William Fulford, "The Set," and The Oxford and Cambridge Magazine". Victorian Periodicals Review. 45 (3): 301–319. doi:10.1353/vpr.2012.0025. S2CID 161858911.
- Fleming, P.C. (ed.). "The Oxford and Cambridge Magazine". rossettiarchive.org. Archived from the original on 16 February 2020.
- Gordon, Walter K. (1966). "Pre-Raphaelitism and the "Oxford and Cambridge Magazine"". The Journal of the Rutgers University Libraries. 29 (2): 42–51. doi:10.14713/jrul.v29i2.1455.
- Mackail, John William (1922). The Life of William Morris . London etc.: Longmans, Green and Co. – via Wikisource.
