= Jessie Grimson =

British Violinist

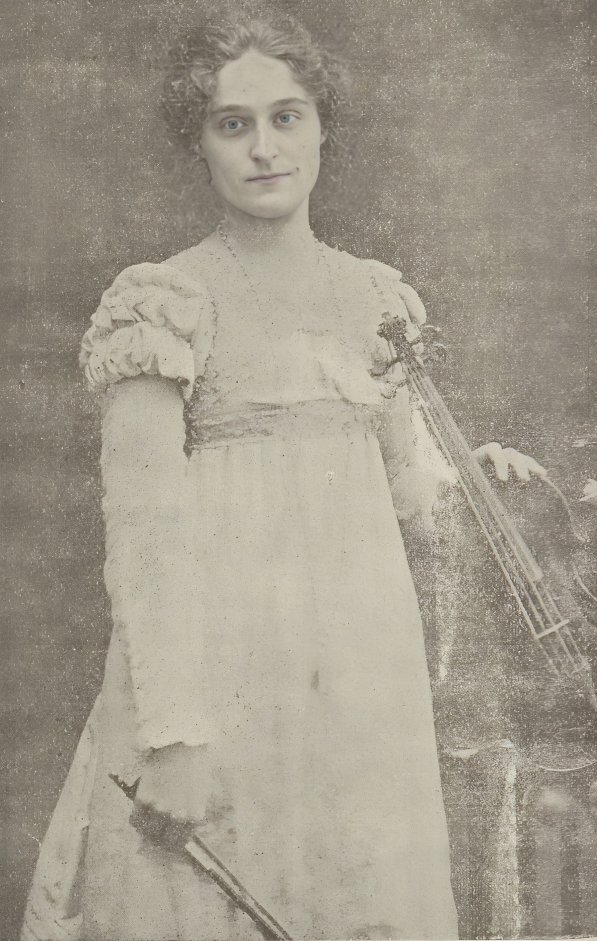
- Born: 26 November 1873; Pimlico, London
- Died: 19 October 1954 (aged 80)
- Education: Royal College of Music
- Occupations: Violinist, violin teacher

Jessie Grimson (26 November 1873 – 19 October 1954) was a British violinist and violin teacher. In 1913, she was one of the first women to join the Queen's Hall Orchestra, founded in 1895.

== Life ==
Jessie Grimson was born 26 November 1873 in Pimlico, London, the daughter of Maria Mary Anne Grimson (née Bonarius; 1848–1896) and her husband, the violinist and violin teacher Samuel Dean Grimson (1842-1922). All seven of the Grimson children grew up to become musicians and/or composers. Jessie was taught first by her father, and later by other tutors including August Wilhelmj, Henry Holmes, and Richard Gompertz at the Royal College of Music.

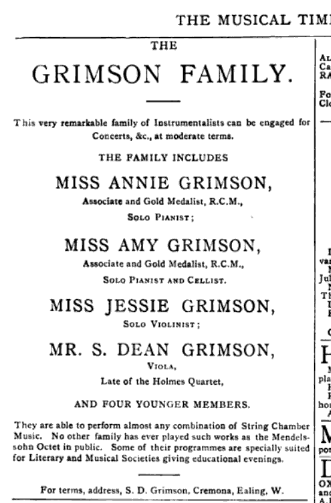
Advertisement from The Musical Times, 1895

As the Grimson Family, the Grimson siblings and their father gave public concerts.

In 1888, Jessie Grimson took part in the final examination for Open Scholarships at the Royal College of Music, and was later listed among the “proximè accesserunt" (closest to winning). The next year, she enrolled at the Hyde Park Academy of Music for Ladies. While a student there, she performed twice at Steinway Hall.

In February 1891, Grimson won one of the eleven Open Free Scholarships to the Royal College of Music, whose concerts she took part in up to seven times a year, solo and in ensembles.

From 1895, adverts for the Grimson Family appeared in publications. These stated:

They are able to perform almost any combination of string chamber music. No other family has ever played such works as the Mendelssohn Octet in public. Some of their programs are specially suited for Literary and Musical Societies giving educational evenings.

Their debut concert took place in January 1896. Sometimes appearing as an eight-piece, members of the family also performed as a quartet or trio, as well as with other musicians. Jessie Grimson also performed as a soloist, including at the South Place Sunday Concerts, and other venues across London. She was praised as an "intelligent and painstaking artist", who could perform with "suavity and fluency". Between 1887 and 1927, Grimson performed in the concerts at South Place 105 times.

Grimson went on to found her own ensemble, and the Jessie Grimson String Quartet made its debut in May 1902 at Bechstein Hall. Alongside her, it included Frank Bridge on violin, Ernest Tomlinson on viola, and Edward Mason on cello. Grimson married Edward Mason in 1905.

Between 1912 and 1917, Jessie Grimson was also involved in the Society of Women Musicians.

In 1913, Grimson became one of the first women accepted by conductor Henry Wood to join the Queen's Hall Orchestra. All six of the women selected had been students of the Royal College of Music. They were: Jessie Grimson, Elsie Dudding, Dora Garland, Jessie Stewart, Sybil Maturin, and Rebecca Clarke.

Edward Mason was killed in France during the First World War.

In 1928 Jessie Grimson was made an honorary member of the Royal College of Music. As a teacher, her students included Marjorie Hayward and Nona Liddell.

Grimson lived in London until her death, on 19 October 1954.
