= Conway Hall =

Concert hall in London, England

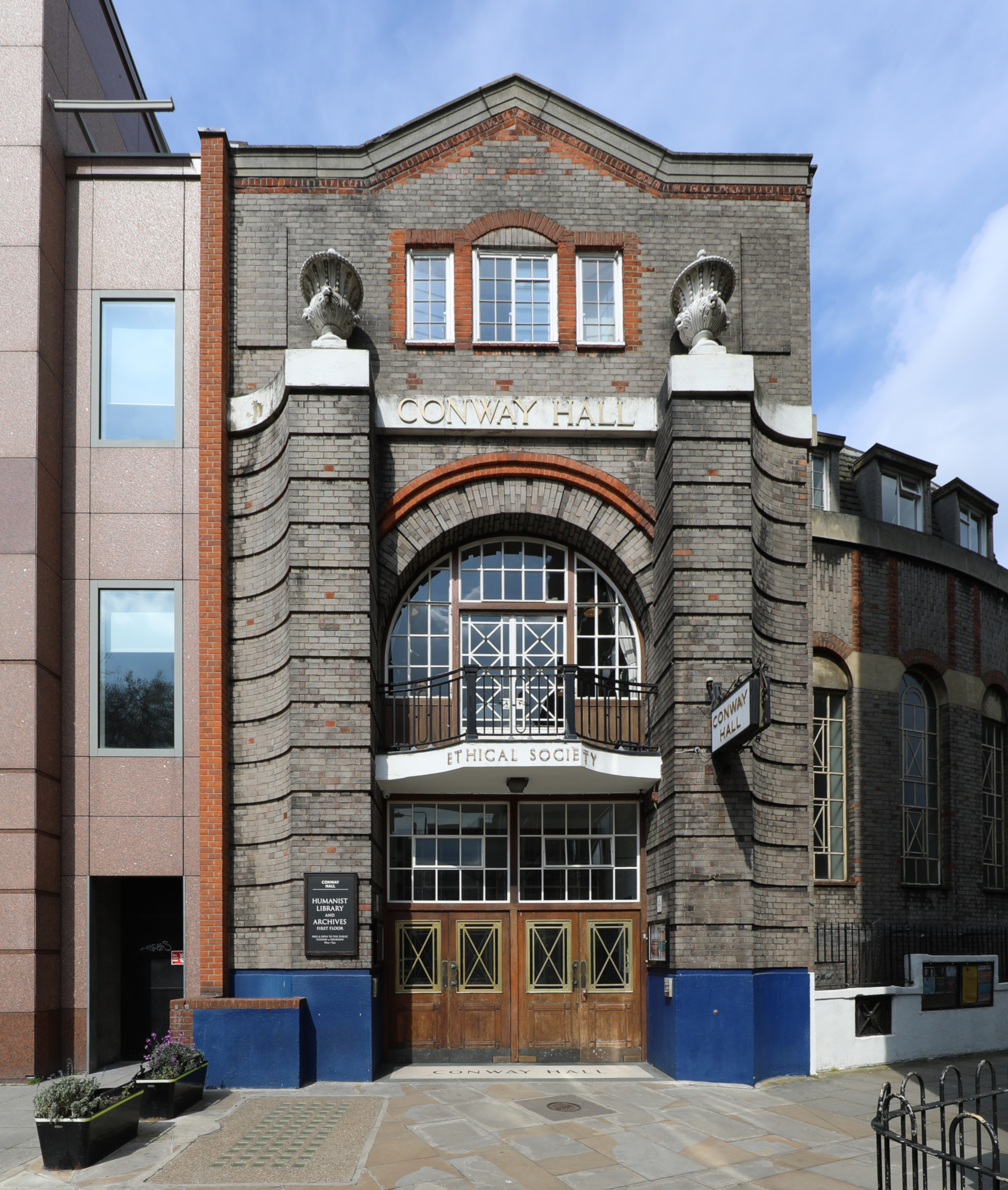
- Conway Hall, now numbered as 25 Red Lion Square, London, WC1R 4RL
- Interactive map of the Conway Hall area

General information
- Type: Concert Hall
- Architectural style: Art Deco
- Location: 25 Red Lion Square, London, WC1R 4RL, England, United Kingdom
- Coordinates: 51°31′11″N 00°07′06″W
- Construction started: February 1928
- Inaugurated: 23 September 1929
- Cost: GBP £28,485 (1928)
- Owner: Conway Hall Ethical Society

Design and construction
- Architect: Frederick Herbert Mansford
- Main contractor: John Greenwood Ltd

Website
- Official website

References
- Conway Hall History

Conway Hall in Red Lion Square, London, is the headquarters of the Conway Hall Ethical Society. It is a Grade II listed building.

== History ==
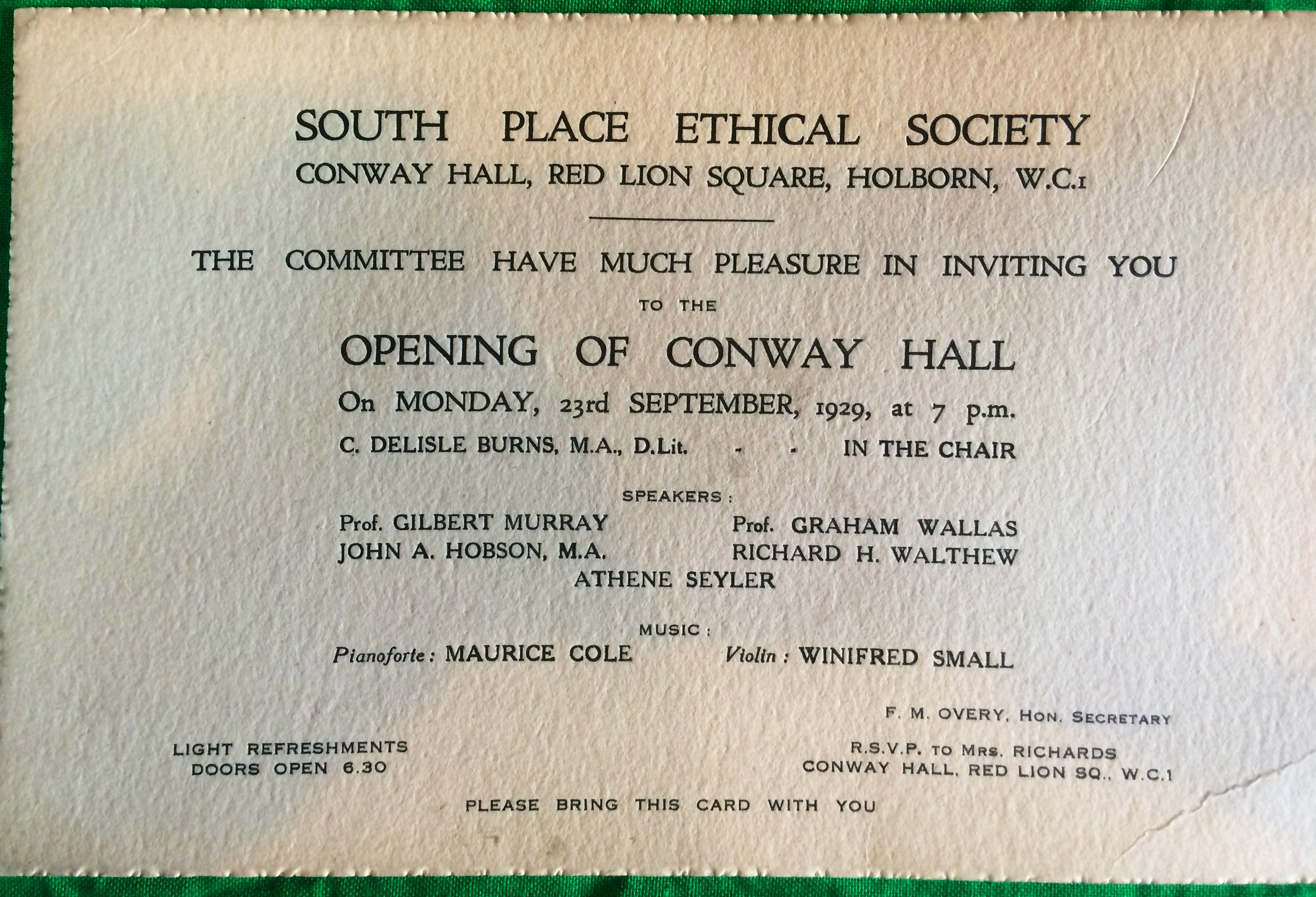
Invitation to the opening ceremony at Conway Hall, Red Lion Square. Monday 23 September 1929. Chaired by C. Delisle Burns. Speakers: Gilbert Murray, Graham Wallas, John A. Hobson, Richard H. Walthew, Athene Seyler. Music: Maurice Cole, Winifred Small.

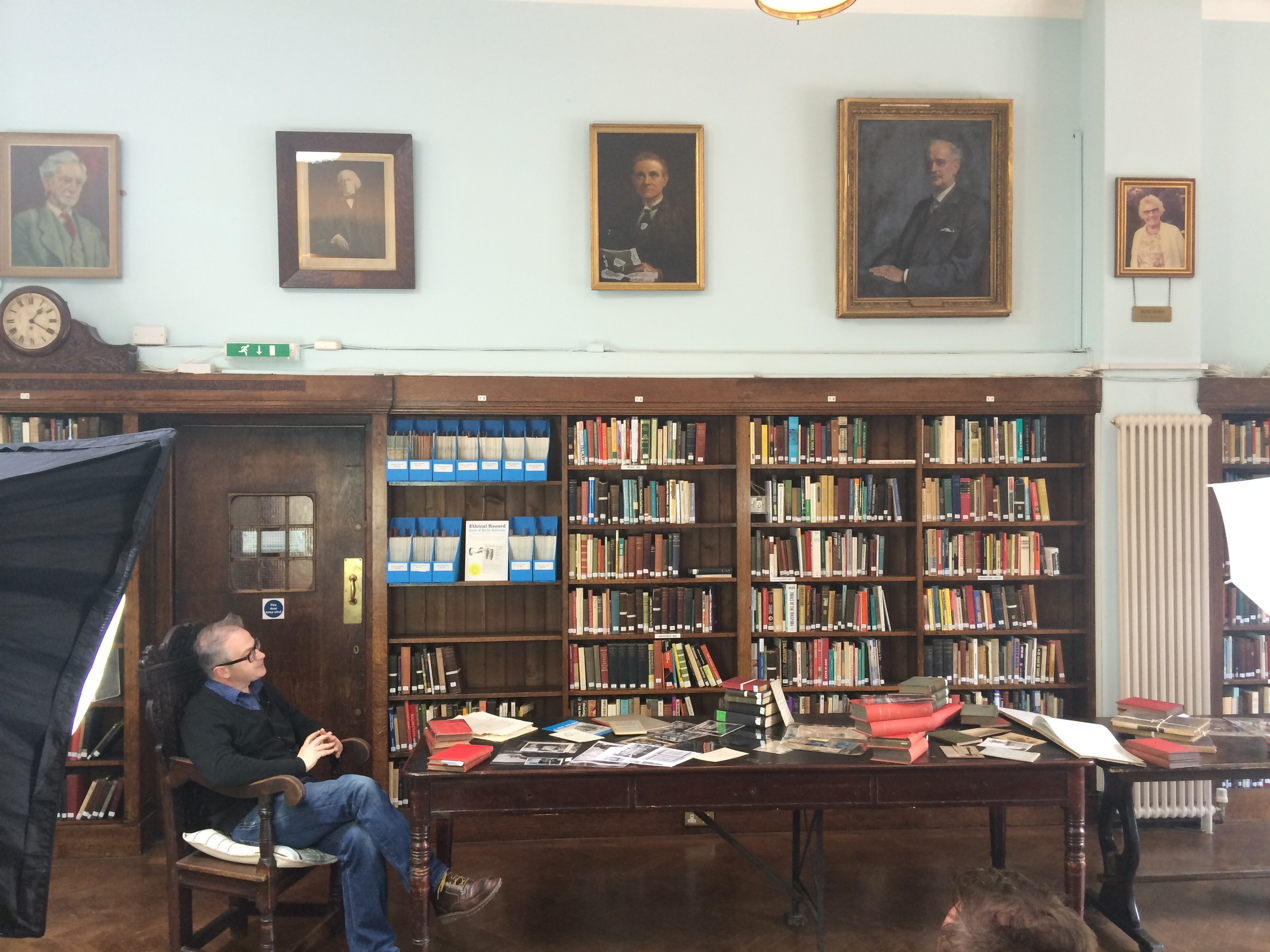
Photo of Conway Hall Library with comedian Robin Ince

The building was commissioned by the South Place Ethical Society, which had previously been accommodated in a chapel in South Place, near Finsbury Circus. The site they selected, in Red Lion Square, was a tenement, previously used as a factory belonging to James Perry, a pen and ink maker.

The new building was designed by Frederick Mansford in the Art Deco style, built in silver-grey brick with red brick detailing and was officially opened on 23 September 1929.

It was named after an American, Moncure D. Conway, who led the Society from 1864 to 1885 and from 1892 to 1897. Speakers at Conway Hall have included George Orwell, who took part in a demonstration demanding freedom of the press there in November 1945.

During a National Front meeting at the building in June 1974, there were clashes between the National Front, anti-fascists, and police stationed to keep the peace; 54 demonstrators were arrested, many were injured, and one anti-fascist, Kevin Gateley, was killed.

== Architecture ==
The new building was built on an L-shaped strip of land which the Society had acquired between Theobalds Road and Lamb's Conduit Passage. It was Mansford's largest project. The main entrance is located on an angle with a narrow arch rising to the top of the first floor. The arch is flanked by two columns in silver-grey brick while the rest of the building is varied with red-brick detailing. There is an opening with four doors on the ground floor, a Diocletian window on the first floor and a Venetian Window on the second floor. The glazing bars form a distinctive tiny criss-cross pattern reflected in Conway Hall's logo. The general feel is that of the Royal Shakespeare Theatre at Stratford-upon-Avon.

Mansford was aware that his design could appear incoherent and tried to make the elevation hang together by placing six stone urns, bought from a City bank, along roof level, two of them on top of the entrance columns.

The main auditorium can hold 300 plus 180 in a gallery, and in recent years has been used as a corporate events space for conferences and product launches. The use of wooden panelling nailed directly to the brickwork and of acoustic plaster gives the hall excellent acoustic qualities; this makes it very suitable for the performance of music, and there have been regular recordings and concerts there. The ceiling of the auditorium was glazed, and this made it very light and airy for the time. It opened in 1929 and has continued in use since.

Above the proscenium arch the words "To Thine Own Self Be True" (quoting Polonius in Shakespeare's Hamlet) can be seen. These words were originally inscribed on the back wall of the red mahogany panel at the original South Place Chapel.

== Library ==
The Conway Hall Library and Archives based on the first floor holds the largest and most comprehensive humanist research resource in the UK.

== Film location ==
The hall has been used as a location for various film and television productions. The building has appeared in Mr. Holmes and Hereafter.
