= String Quintet (Schubert) =

String quintet composition by Franz Schubert

- by Franz Schubert
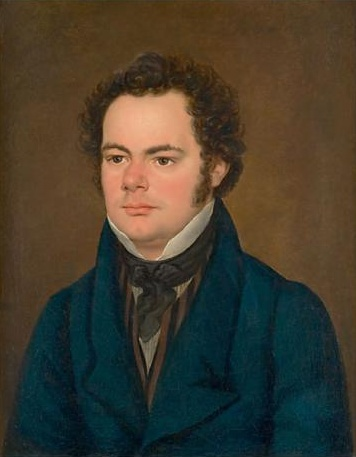
- Schubert in 1827 (oil on canvas, by Anton Depauly)
- Key: C major
- Catalogue: D. 956
- Opus: 163
- Commissioned by: Ferdinand Troyer
- Composed: 1828
- Performed: 1850
- Published: 1853
- Publisher: C. A. Spina
- Duration: c. 53 minutes
- Movements: 4

Franz Schubert's final chamber work, the String Quintet in C major (D. 956, Op. posth. 163) is sometimes called the "Cello Quintet" because it is scored for a standard string quartet with a second cello rather than a second viola, which is more usual.

The piece was composed in 1828 and completed just two months before the composer's death. The first public performance of the piece did not occur until 1850, and publication occurred three years later in 1853. Schubert's only full-fledged string quintet, it has been called "sublime" and "extraordinary", been said to possess "bottomless pathos", and is generally regarded as Schubert's finest chamber work as well as one of the greatest compositions in all chamber music.

A typical performance lasts no more than an hour.

== Composition and publication history ==
The quintet was composed in the summer or early autumn of 1828, at the same time as Schubert composed his last three piano sonatas and several of the Schwanengesang songs. Schubert completed it in late September or early October, just two months before his death.

He submitted it to one of his publishers, Heinrich Albert Probst, for consideration, saying, "finally I have written a quintet for 2 violins, 1 viola, and 2 violoncelli ... the quintet rehearsal will only begin in the next few days. Should any of these compositions by any chance commend themselves to you, please let me know." Probst replied, asking only to see some of Schubert's vocal works and requesting more popular piano music. Even at this very late stage in Schubert's career, he was regarded as a composer who mainly focused on songs and piano pieces and was not taken seriously as a chamber music composer.

The work remained unpublished at the time of Schubert's death in November 1828; the manuscript was sold to the Viennese publisher Diabelli by Schubert's brother Ferdinand shortly thereafter, but was neglected and waited 25 years to be published, in 1853. The manuscript and all sketches are now lost. The first known public performance occurred three years earlier, on 17 November 1850 at the Musikverein in Vienna.

== Instrumentation and genre ==
The work is the only full-fledged string quintet in Schubert's oeuvre. When he began composing it, Schubert had already written an impressive body of chamber music for strings, including at least 15 string quartets, most of which were composed for domestic performance by his family's string quartet.

Schubert selected the key of C major in a possible gesture to two composers he greatly admired, Mozart and Beethoven, both of whom wrote string quintets in that key, Mozart's String Quintet No. 3 in C major, K. 515 and Beethoven's String Quintet, Op. 29 in C major. According to Charles Rosen, the opening theme emulates many characteristics of the Mozart quintet's opening theme, such as decorative turns, irregular phrase lengths, and rising staccato arpeggios (the latter appear only in Schubert's recapitulation).

But whereas the string quintets of Mozart and Beethoven are composed for a string quartet augmented by a second viola, Schubert employs two cellos instead, creating richness in the lower register. Before Schubert, Luigi Boccherini had replaced the second viola with a second cello, but Schubert's use of the second cello is very different from that of Boccherini, who uses the additional cello to create an additional viola line. Alfred Einstein has proposed that Schubert's use of a second cello to enhance the lower strings may have been suggested by George Onslow, who used a double bass in some of his quintets.

== Analysis ==
The string quintet consists of four movements in the usual quick-slow-scherzo-quick pattern:

1. Allegro ma non troppo
2. Adagio
3. Scherzo. Presto – Trio. Andante sostenuto
4. Allegretto

=== I. Allegro ma non troppo ===
In common with other late Schubert works (notably, the symphony in C major, D. 944, the piano sonata in B♭ major, D. 960, and the string quartet in G major, D. 887), the quintet opens with an extremely expansive movement: an Allegro ma non troppo that accounts for more than a third of the piece's length (typically, 50 minutes). The movement is notable for its unexpected harmonic turns.

The exposition, lasting 154 bars, begins with an expansive C major chord: as in the G major quartet, D. 887, Schubert here "presents his harmonies—rather than a memorable, well-contoured melody—without a regular rhythmic pulse." This is followed by music of gradually increasing motion and tension, leading to a contrasting second subject in E♭, introduced as a duet for the celli. The exposition concludes with a dominant (G major) chord that leads naturally back to the opening tonic chord on the repeat. But after the repeat of the exposition, Schubert begins the development section with a daring modulation from the dominant to the submediant that "lift[s] the music magically" from G major to A major.

=== II. Adagio ===
The "sublime" second movement, one of Schubert's rare adagios, is in ABA (ternary) form. The outer sections, in E major, are of an otherworldly tranquility, while the central section is intensely turbulent and breaks suddenly into the distant key of F minor. When the opening music returns, there is a running 32nd-note passage in the second cello that seems to have been motivated by the turbulence that came before it. In the last three measures, Schubert ties the movement together harmonically with a modulation to the F minor of the middle section and an immediate return to E major.

The use of ternary structure to contrast tranquil outer sections with a turbulent central section resembles the second movement of Schubert's Piano Sonata in A major, D. 959, composed at the same time as the quintet.

The juxtaposition of E major and F minor, distantly related keys, establishes the importance of the "tonal relationship of lowered second degree" (or flat supertonic) "to the tonic", which is exploited in the third and fourth movements.

=== III. Scherzo ===
The Scherzo, in C major, is symphonic and large-scaled, with the open strings of the lower instruments exploited in an innovative manner that creates a volume of sound seemingly beyond the capabilities of five stringed instruments. The first section moves to A♭ major and then back to C major. The middle section moves to E♭ major, then B major, which is ♭VI of ♭III. The C-major theme returns at the end. The Trio is in D♭ major, creating another flat-supertonic relationship.

=== IV. Allegretto ===
The last movement is an exuberant sonata-rondo whose form resembles that of the finale of Mozart's C major quintet. The main theme has clear Hungarian influences. The movement is in C major but is built upon the interplay of the major and minor modes. It has unusual technical features, such as the final two notes: the flat supertonic (D♭) and the tonic (C), played forte in all parts. (Note: Use of the flat supertonic is normally associated with the Neapolitan chord; but in Schubert's late works especially, the first note in this progression is often combined with augmented sixth harmony built on the flat supertonic rather than on the usual flat submediant. That characteristic harmonization is indeed used for a sustained flat supertonic in the bass part in the fourth- and fifth-last measures of the work.)

== Legacy ==
After Schubert's string quintet was belatedly premiered and published in the 1850s, it gradually gained recognition as a masterpiece. The consensus is that the Quintet represents a high point in the entire chamber repertoire.

An early admirer was Brahms, whose Piano Quintet (1865) was inspired in part by the newly discovered work. In fact, Brahms originally wrote that work as a string quintet with two cellos and only later recast it as a piano quintet. The piano quintet is in F minor, the key of the central section of Schubert's Adagio, while the third movement recalls the C minor/major of Schubert's Quintet, and that movement ends in the same manner as Schubert's finale, with strong emphasis on the flat supertonic D♭, before the final tonic C.

Schubert's quintet was orchestrated by the Japanese conductor and composer Hidemaro Konoye.

There is no reason to believe Schubert expected to die so soon after composing the work, but the fact that it was completed just two months before his death has led some listeners to hear in it a valedictory or death-haunted quality. For John Reed, the quintet prefigures Schubert's death, ending as it does with D♭ followed by C, both in unison and octaves: "As Browning's Abt Vogler put it, 'Hark, I have dared and done, for my resting place is found, The C major of this life; so, and now I will try to sleep.'" The violinist John Saunders had the second theme of the first movement carved on his tombstone; Arthur Rubinstein wished to have the second movement played at his funeral.

The second movement has often been used as background music for pensive or nocturnal scenes in film. Examples include Nocturne Indien, Conspiracy, The Human Stain, and Jim Jarmusch's The Limits of Control. Episode 21 of the Inspector Morse television series (Dead on Time) draws extensively from this quintet, as do Episode 16 (Lazaretto) of its prequel Endeavour and certain episodes of Desmond Morris's BBC series The Human Animal.

== Notable recordings ==
Schubert's string quintet has often been recorded. The first recording was made by the Cobbett Quartet in 1925. Two recordings from the early 1950s are widely cited as legendary: a 1952 performance featuring Isaac Stern and Alexander Schneider, violins; Milton Katims, viola; and Pablo Casals and Paul Tortelier, cellos; and a 1951 performance by the Hollywood String Quartet with Kurt Reher on second cello (a 1994 CD reissue of this performance received a Gramophone Award).

Among modern recordings, that by Melos Quartet with Mstislav Rostropovich (1977) has been acclaimed, and is notable for the Adagio's exceptionally slow tempo. Rostropovich also recorded the quintet with the Emerson String Quartet in 1990, on the occasion of the gala concert celebrating the 125th anniversary of the BASF AG, Ludwigshafen. A few recordings of the quintet performed on period instruments exist, including a 1990 recording on the Vivarte label with Vera Beths and Lisa Rautenberg, violins; Steven Dann, viola; and Anner Bylsma and Kenneth Slowik, cellos.
