= John Saunders (musician) =

British musician (1867–1919)

- Born: 1867
- Died: 1919 (aged 51–52)
- Resting place: Norwood Cemetery
- Education: Guildhall School of Music
- Occupations: Musician, violinist
- Organization(s): Royal Philharmonic Society; South Place Ethical Society

John Saunders (1867 – 7 October 1919) was a British musician, who led the Royal Philharmonic Society's Orchestra, and performed in the South Place Sunday Concerts for 27 years. In his Cyclopedic Survey of Chamber Music, Walter Willson Cobbett described Saunders as "one of the most remarkable figures in the musical life of London from 1890 until his untimely death in 1919".

== Life ==
Saunders studied the violin under John Tiplady Carrodus at the Guildhall School of Music.

In 1891, he became Ieader of the quartet of the South Place Sunday Concerts. In the course of almost three decades there, Saunders played in 239 concerts - nearly a third of all of those given. These included classical and modern chamber music. He was described as "a most refined and gifted violinist who was an ideal ensemble player". Between 1894 and 1895, he also took part in a series of Concerts for Children in Hampstead and Kensington, presented by Annie Muirhead. These included explanatory talks alongside performances by well-respected musicians, intended to cultivate an enthusiasm for classical music among a younger audience.

Between 1904 and 1911, Saunders was the lead violinist for Symphony Concerts at The Old Vic.

Saunders also led the John Saunders Quartet, which gained a reputation throughout London and the provinces for the high standard of its performances. In 1910, Saunders was appointed leader of the Royal Philharmonic Society orchestra, described as "the highest position in orchestral music which this country [England] affords". He held it until his death.

In 1916, a group of fellow musicians presented Saunders with a Stradivarius violin at a dinner held in his honour.

During the summer before he died, Saunders led the orchestra of the Russian Ballet at the Alhambra Theatre.

He lived in Clapham, with his wife Charlotte Jane Saunders.

== Death and legacy ==
John Saunders died on 7 October 1919. This was felt, reported The Times, as a "severe loss to musical interests." He was buried in Norwood Cemetery, where his tombstone included some bars of Schubert’s String Quintet in C major.

After his death, the following tribute was printed on the South Place concert programme:

During half his life, and almost the whole of his artistic career, he devoted himself unsparingly to the South Place Concerts. How he helped them may be gathered to some extent from the fact that he played at 239, nearly a third of the 791 given... No artist has been more thorough and unselfish in fostering the love of chamber music, and a mere list of the works in which he played would be a very long one. All connected with the South Place Concerts will ever remember that to him, more than anyone else, is due the artistic success which has been achieved, and which it is hoped will be continued. To see that this standard is maintained, and to endeavour to reach his ideals, will surely be the best tribute to his memory.

In his Cyclopedic Survey of Chamber Music, Walter Willson Cobbett wrote: "It would be difficult to estimate the services and the influence of the [John Saunders] Quartet in promoting a love and better understanding of chamber music. It is certain that they did much to make the South Place concerts the most famous series of chamber music concerts in England since the days of the old St. James’s ‘Pops’".

Friends of Saunders raised money for a John Saunders Scholarship for the Violin at the Guildhall School of Music. A series of five concerts in aid of the scholarship were held at South Place 1919–1920, with performers including Landon Ronald, Joseph Holbrooke, Jessie Grimson, and Richard Henry Walthew. A subscription was also raised at the Old Vic, acknowledging Saunders' role there 1904–11. A portrait of Saunders hangs in Conway Hall, London.
