= Cecil Forsyth =

English composer and musicologist

Cecil Forsyth (30 November 1870, in Greenwich – 7 December 1941, New York City) was an English composer and musicologist.

== Career ==
He studied at the University of Edinburgh and at the Royal College of Music (with Charles Villiers Stanford and Hubert Parry), and played viola in various London orchestras (including the Queen's Hall Orchestra) while establishing himself as a composer. In 1914 he moved to the US and took up a position at the music publishers H.W. Gray, who also became his publisher. He continued to compose and secure performances in the US, though mostly with choral societies and glee clubs. He died in New York in 1941. Without the composer present to promote it, his music lost traction in the UK and was largely forgotten.

== Composer ==
As a composer he was best known for his G minor Viola Concerto, premiered at the Proms in 1903 with Émile Férir as soloist, and repeated in 1904 and 1906. According to Lewis Foreman, it is "possibly the first full blown concerto for viola by a British composer". (York Bowen's Viola Concerto followed in 1907). There is a modern recording by Lawrence Power and the BBC Scottish Symphony Orchestra. Chanson Celtique (1906) for viola and piano, also achieved some popularity and was later orchestrated.

The orchestral suite Four Studies from Victor Hugo also had its debut at the Proms in 1905. There were two comic operas, Westward Ho! and Cinderella, both produced in London at the Savoy Theatre, and a setting of Keats' Ode to a Nightingale, published in 1894.The unaccompanied choral variations on Old King Cole from 1912 gained some popularity because of its humour. There were also two sacred Masses and various songs, such as In Old Japan (setting W. E. Henley), The Return (setting Arthur Symons) and The Watcher, op. 74 (setting James Stephens).

Once in the US, Forsyth composed The Last Supper: a Lenten Meditation in 1916 for chorus and orchestra, and two choral ballads for soloists with orchestra, Tinker, Tailor (1919) and The Luck of Eden Hall (1922). Other works composed in America were The Dark Road for viola and strings (1922) and the six movement Alice in Wonderland orchestral suite (1927).

== Author ==
His most successful book was Orchestration, originally published in 1914 and revised in 1935. Dover published a reprint of this revision in 1983 with a new foreword by composer William Bolcom, who lauds especially Forsyth's insight into instrumental culture and his wit. Conductor Adrian Boult recalled how Forsyth advised Ralph Vaughan Williams about the orchestration of the latter's A London Symphony. Forsyth's other books include Music and Nationalism: A Study of English Opera (1911), Choral Orchestration (1920), A History of Music (1916, with Stanford), Modern Violin Playing (1920, with Samuel Dean Grimson), A Digest of Music History (1923) and a collection of essays, Clashpans (1933).
