= Godfrey Lushington =

British civil servant (1832–1907)

Sir Godfrey Lushington GCMG KCB (8 March 1832 – 5 February 1907) was a British civil servant. A promoter of prison reform, Lushington served as Permanent Under-Secretary of State at the Home Office of the United Kingdom from 1886 to 1895.

== Biography ==
Lushington was born in Westminster, on 8 March 1832, to Stephen and Sarah Grace (née Carr) Lushington; his twin brother was Vernon Lushington, Q.C., a county court judge. Educated at Rugby School and Balliol College, Oxford, he received his degree in 1854, and was President of the Oxford Union in 1853–1854 and was elected a fellow of All Souls in 1854. Two years later, in 1856, he wrote a "rather scathing essay on his Alma Mater" in The Oxford and Cambridge Magazine.

In 1865, he married Beatrice Anne Shore Smith (1835–1914), daughter of barrister Samuel Smith and granddaughter of William Smith. She was also a cousin of Florence Nightingale and of Barbara Bodichon.

With his brother Vernon, he advocated positivist philosophy, motivated by the ideas of Auguste Comte. A supporter of labour movements, he, and fellow positivist intellectuals A.J. Mundella, Edward Spencer Beesly, Henry Crompton, and Frederic Harrison, played a leading role in the acceptance of trades' union legitimacy.

Influenced by Frederick Denison Maurice, Lushington joined his brother, and Frederic Harrison, as a teacher at the Working Men's College, and became a benefactor and member of the College governing corporation.

He rose to Permanent Under-Secretary of State at the Home Office in 1885, and was knighted in 1892. During his Home Office tenure the Whitechapel Murders gripped attention and imagination; a Jewish and Anarchist connection was seriously considered. The chalked Goulston Street message was seen by Commissioner Charles Warren to have potential for increased religious tension; Warren explained to Lushington that reason for the immediate removal of the message.

He retired from the civil service in 1895 and became an alderman of London County Council, a position held until 1898 when he became one of the British Government delegates to the Rome Anti-Anarchist Congress, (24 November to 21 December 1898) with Sir Philip Currie and Sir C. Howard Vincent.

After retirement, Lushington gave evidence to the Gladstone Committee on prison reform: "I regard as unfavourable to reformation the status of a prisoner throughout his whole career; the crushing of self-respect, the starving of all moral instinct he may possess, the absence of all opportunity to do or receive a kindness, the continual association of none but criminals, the forced labour, and the denial of all liberty. I believe the true method of reforming a man, of restoring him to society, is exactly in the opposite direction to all these."
