= Josephine Troup =

English composer

Emily Josephine Troup
- Born: 7 July 1853; Woodberry Down, London
- Died: 11 April 1913 (aged 59); Saltwood, Kent, England
- Burial place: Kensal Green Cemetery
- Monuments: Josephine Troup Scholarship at the Royal Academy of Music
- Occupations: Pianist and composer

Emily Josephine Troup (7 July 1853, Woodberry Down, London – 11 April 1913, Saltwood, Kent) was an English composer of songs and works for piano and violin. She founded a scholarship for female students studying orchestral composition at the Royal Academy of Music, in London, in 1905.

== Family and early life ==
Josephine was the youngest daughter of Susanna and John Troup, a jeweller and watchmaker, of Essex Lodge, Clapton, England. According to her obituary,

Her early years were spent among Unitarian surroundings where it is thought she probably acquired the habit of industry that led her to develop so fully her exceptional musical and literary gifts, and the keen sense of duty that made her ever anxious to use them as a means of social service.

=== Career ===
Troup was an active member of the South Place Ethical Society, contributing to its newsletters and participating in fundraising activities, and among the earliest members of the West London Ethical Society. An obituary published in the Report of the Committee of South Place Ethical Society, May 1913, described her as the “Eliza Flower of our generation” making reference to the composer and prominent member of the Society during the early 19th century.

Between January 1889 and February 1902 she took part in 49 Sunday Evening Concerts at South Place, later joining the Society. She was known too for her financial largesse giving generously to societies in both the UK and America.

In addition to her Every-day Songs for children’s services, Josephine compiled and edited three Ethical Hymn Books, including Ethical Songs with Music (1892), and Hymns of Modern Thought (1912). Her contributions were so great that she veiled her identity under a variety of pseudonyms.

=== Death ===
Troup died on 11 April 1913 and was buried in Kensal Green Cemetery. At her memorial service, William Rawlings said of her: 'She was always overflowing with cheerfulness and vivacity, bearing with her an atmosphere of brightness and lightheartedness; and at the same time one of sincerity, earnestness, and depth of character.’

== Selected works ==
=== Orchestral ===
- 'March of the Workers' for soprano, bass solo, chorus and orchestra.

=== Chamber ===
- Romanza in C for string quartet Six sketches for violin and piano pub. by Ascherberg, Hopwood & Crew Ltd
- Kleines Wiegenlied (1909)
- Portuguese Love Song
- Spring Showers

=== Children's songs ===
Selected works include:

- The Daddy Longlegs (Text: Edward Lear)
- The Duck and the Kangaroo (Text: Edward Lear)
- The Jumblies (Text: Edward Lear)
- In love, if love be love (Text: Lord Alfred Tennyson)
- On a faded violet (Text: Percy Bysshe Shelley)
- Today (Text: Thomas Carlyle)
