= Richard Watson Dixon =

English poet and divine (1833–1900)

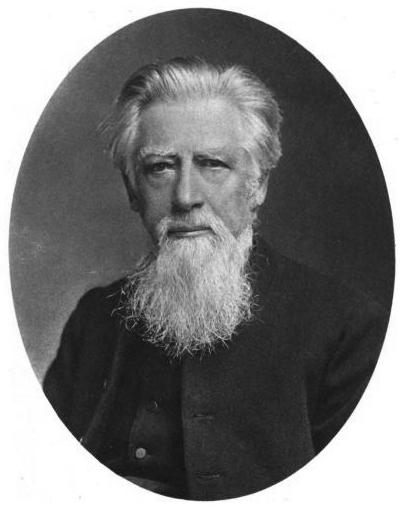
- from the Last Poems of Richard Watson Dixon 1905
- Born: 5 May 1833; Islington, England
- Died: 23 January 1900 (aged 66)
- Education: King Edward's School, Birmingham; Pembroke College, Oxford
- Writing career
- Genre: Poetry
- Movement: Pre-Raphaelite Brotherhood

Richard Watson Dixon (5 May 1833 – 23 January 1900), English poet and divine, son of Dr James Dixon, a Wesleyan minister.

== Biography ==
He was the eldest son of Dr. James Dixon, a distinguished Wesleyan preacher, by Mary, only daughter of the Rev. Richard Watson. In the biography he wrote of his father, Dixon describes his mother as 'an excellent Latin and Greek scholar, a perfect French and a sufficient Italian linguist, and an exquisite musician;' and of his grandmother, Mrs. Watson, who made a home with her daughter, he retained an affectionate recollection as of a very good and clever woman. Both the Watsons and Dixons belonged to the early school of Methodists, who did not renounce their membership in the church of England, so that there was no feeling that Dixon had been disloyal to their communion when he prepared for orders in the church.

He was born on 5 May 1833 at Islington, and educated, under Dr. Gifford, at King Edward's School, Birmingham, where he had for school friends Edwin Hatch and Edward Burne-Jones. In June 1851, he matriculated at Pembroke College, Oxford, and when in the Christmas term of the same year Edward Burne-Jones and William Morris came up to Exeter College, they, with William Fulford, Charles Faulkner, Cormell Price, and a few more, formed a close brotherhood. An excellent account of these Oxford days was contributed by Dixon to Mr. J. W. Mackail's Life of Morris. He says 'Jones and Morris were both meant for holy orders, and the same may be said of the rest of us except Faulkner; but the bond of alliance was poetry and indefinite artistic and literary aspirations. We all had the notion of doing great things for men according to our own will and bent.' With Morris, Dixon projected The Oxford and Cambridge Magazine, and had a hand, under Rossetti's direction, in the amateur distempering of the walls of Woodward's new debating hall at the Oxford Union with frescoes from the Arthurian Romances, now almost completely obliterated. Dixon did not in after life pursue painting as a study—a single canvas, a wedding-scene from Chaucer, is, it is believed, the only picture of his that survives —but he always retained his interest, and a visit to the old masters in the National Gallery was a regular incident of any visit to London. At Oxford Dixon read for the ordinary classical schools, and graduated B.A. in 1857. The next year he won the Arnold historical prize for an essay on 'The Close of the Tenth Century of the Christian Era,' and in 1863 Oxford's Sacred Poem Prize, the subject being 'St. John in Patmos.' The poem is in the heroic couplet, and is a very dignified and impressive piece of writing. His first published volume of poems, called 'Christ's Company,' had already appeared in 1861, and a second, 'Historical Odes,' followed in 1863. These early poems of Dixon were distinguished by not a little of the colour and imagination, and also by something of the eccentricity, that marked the early efforts of the Pre-Raphaelite school.

The poems of the first volume, though largely upon religious subjects, are not strictly religious poetry; they are works of picturesque imagination rather than of devotional feeling. The 'Historical Odes' show an advance in simplicity, and a power, that Dixon afterwards carried further, of ode construction. The odes upon Wellington and Marlborough contain much good writing, and deserve more attention than they have received.

After leaving Oxford, Dixon lodged for a time with Morris and Burne-Jones in Red Lion Square. In 1858, he was ordained to the curacy of St. Mary-the-Less, Lambeth, Mr. Gregory, the present dean of St. Paul's, giving him his title. In 1861, he moved to the curacy of St. Mary, Newington Butts, and became an assistant master at Highgate School, where his pupils included Gerard Manley Hopkins. From 1863 to 1868 he was second master at Carlisle High School, and from 1868 to 1875 minor canon and honorary librarian of Carlisle Cathedral. After that he was for eight years vicar of Hayton, in Cumberland, and was then presented by the bishop of Carlisle to the vicarage of Warkworth in Northumberland, which he held till his death. Besides these small livings, Dixon received no preferment in the church, although the best years of his life were devoted to writing a church history, which took rank from the first moment of its appearance as a standard authority. His friends would have greatly valued for him the increase of leisure and opportunities for study which a cathedral stall would have afforded; but it was not to be. The distinctions which he received after the appearance of the first volume of his history, in 1877, were such as to reduce the already scanty leisure of a hardworked parish clergyman.

In 1874, he had been made honorary canon of Carlisle; in 1879 he became rural dean of Brampton; in 1884 rural dean of Alnwick; and in 1891 examining chaplain to the bishop of Newcastle. He was chaplain to the high sheriff of Cumberland in 1883, and from 1890 to 1894 was a proctor in convocation. He was always singularly modest as to his claims upon recognition; but it gave him genuine pleasure when in the last year of his life his university conferred upon him an honorary doctor's degree in divinity, and his college made him an honorary fellow. In 1885, he stood for the professorship of poetry at Oxford, but withdrew his candidature before the election. The short preface to 'Eudocia and her Brothers' upon the use of the heroic couplet shows that he possessed keen critical powers and a faculty of lucid exposition.

Dixon was briefly considered for Poet Laureate when Alfred Tennyson died in 1892.

In December 1891 Dixon had a severe attack of influenza, which for some long time diminished his power of writing, but he ultimately recovered; a second attack in January 1900 carried him off after a few days' illness.

== Family ==
On 9 April 1861, he married the widow of William Thomson of Haddingtonshire (née Maria Sturgeon). His first wife having died in 1876, Dixon married in 1882 Matilda, eldest daughter of George Routledge. He had no children by either marriage; but he proved an affectionate step-father to the daughters of his first wife.

== Bibliography ==
- "The Rivals", "The Barrier Kingdoms", and "Prospects of Peace", entries in The Oxford and Cambridge Magazine (1856)
- The Close of the Tenth Century of the Christian Era (1858)
- Christ's Company and Other Poems (1861)
- Historical Odes and Other Poems (1864)
- The Life of James Dixon (1874)
- Essay on the Maintenance of the Church of England (1875)
- History of the Church of England from the Abolition of the Roman Jurisdiction (1877-1890)
- Mano: a Poetical History (1883)
- Odes and Eclogues (1884)
- Lyrical Poems (1885)

"The Bible Birthday Book (1887)

- The Story of Eudocia and Her Brothers, a Narrative Poem (1887)
- Songs and Odes (1896)
