= C. Delisle Burns =

English atheist and secularist writer and lecturer

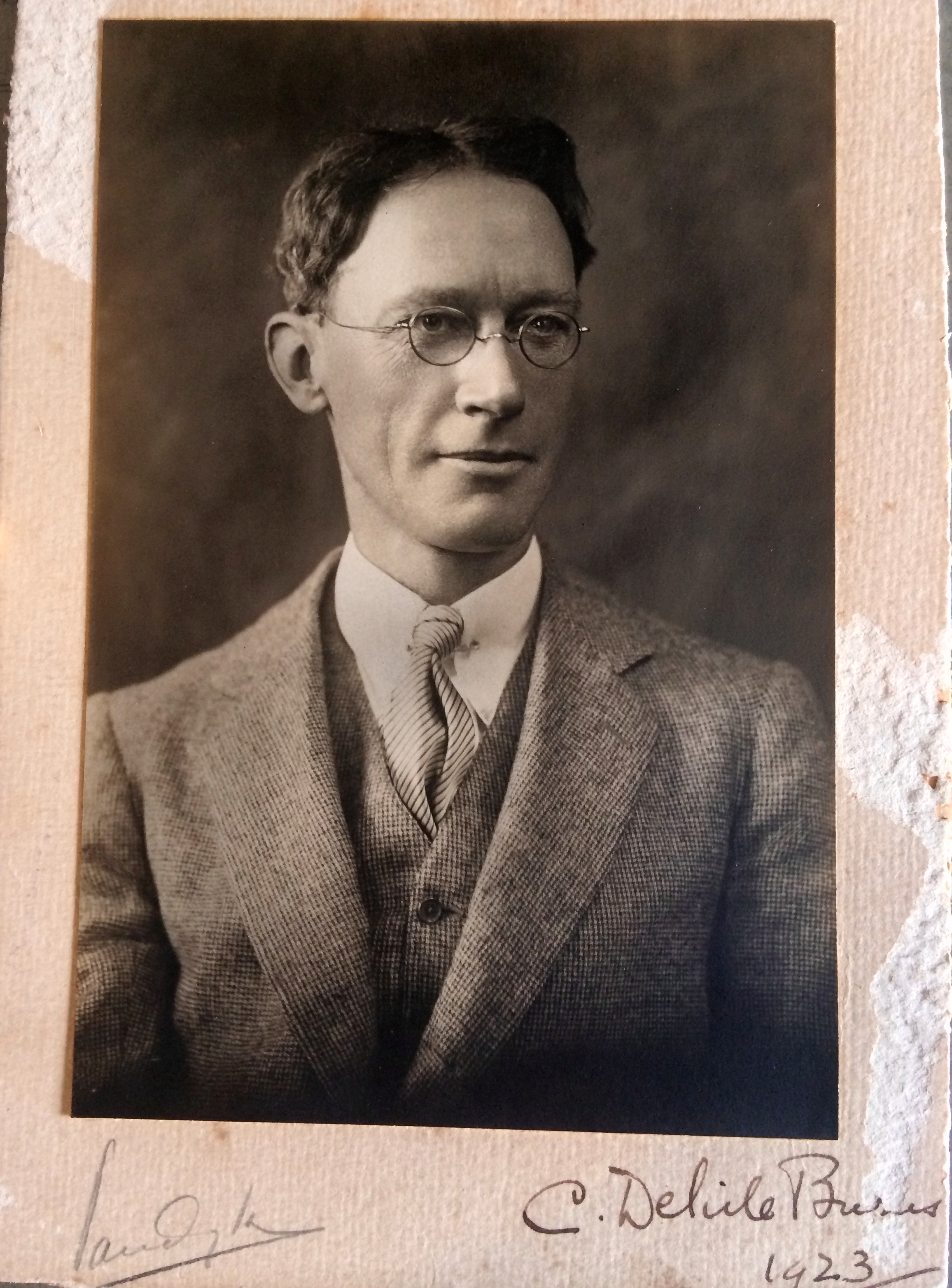
- Signed photo of C. Delisle Burns c. 1923. (taken at Conway Hall Ethical Society Library and Archives)
- Born: 26 January 1879; Saint Kitts and Nevis, West Indies
- Died: 22 January 1942 (aged 62); Dorking, England
- Education: Christ's College, Cambridge
- Occupations: Atheist and secularist writer and lecturer
- Spouse: Margaret Hanny
- Children: Two

Cecil Delisle Burns (26 January 1879 – 22 January 1942) was a leading English atheist and secularist writer and lecturer.

== Early life ==
Burns was born in Saint Kitts and Nevis, West Indies, where his father was treasurer of St. Christopher-Nevis in the Leeward Islands. After leaving Christ's College, Cambridge, he was trained in Rome for the priesthood, but left the Church in 1908 and devoted time to the study of social problems in a wider sense. In 1912, he married the painter Margaret Hannay: the sister of Alexander Howard Hannay, art critic of the famous "London Mercury".

He was appointed as a regular lecturer at South Place Ethical Society, at Conway Hall in London, in 1918 and continued to lecture there until his health deteriorated in September 1934.

He was a lecturer at Birkbeck College, University of London; the London School of Economics and as Stevenson Lecturer in Citizenship at the University of Glasgow.

== Bibliography ==
- The Devil. London, 1909.
- Old Creeds and the New Faith. London: Francis Griffiths, 1911.
- The Morality of Nations: an essay on the theory of politics. London: University of London Press, 1915.
- The World of States. London: Headley Bros., 1917.
- Greek Ideals: the study of social life. London: Bell, 1917.
- International Politics. London: Methuen, 1920.
- The Principles of Revolution: a study in ideals. London: George Allen & Unwin, 1920.
- The Contact Between Minds: a metaphysical hypothesis. London: Macmillan, 1923.
- A Short History of International Intercourse. London: George Allen & Unwin, 1924.
- The Philosophy of Labour. London: George Allen & Unwin, 1925.
- 1918-1928: a short history of the world. London: Victor Gollancz, 1928.
- An Introduction to the Social Sciences. London: George Allen & Unwin, 1930.
- Leisure in the Modern World. London: George Allen & Unwin, 1932.
- The Horizon of Experience: a study of the modern mind. London: George Allen & Unwin, 1933.
- War and a Changing Civilisation. London: John Lane, The Bodley Head, 1934.
- The Challenge to Democracy. London: George Allen & Unwin, 1934.
- Civilisation: the next step. London: Nicholson & Watson, 1938.
- The First Europe: a study of the establishment of medieval Christendom, A.D. 400-800 London: George Allen & Unwin, 1947.
