= Conway Hall Ethical Society =

Oldest surviving freethought and Ethical society in the UK and world

- Founded: 1787; 239 years ago
- Founders: Elhanan Winchester (The Philadelphian congregation), William Johnson Fox (South Place Chapel), Stanton Coit (Ethical Society)
- Type: Educational Charity
- Registration no.: 1156033
- Purpose: The advancement of study, research and education in humanist ethical principles.
- Location: Conway Hall, Holborn, London
- Coordinates: 51°31′11″N 0°07′06″W,
- Origins: South Place Chapel
- Region served: England & Wales
- Owner: Conway Hall Ethical Society
- Chief Executive Officer: Dr Jim Walsh
- Revenue: ▲GBP £917.69K (2022)
- Employees: 20
- Volunteers: 1
- Website: conwayhall.org.uk
- Formerly called: South Place Ethical Society; South Place Institute; South Place Chapel

The Conway Hall Ethical Society, formerly the South Place Ethical Society, based in London at Conway Hall, is thought to be the oldest surviving freethought organisation in the world and is the only remaining ethical society in the United Kingdom. It now advocates secular humanism and is a member of Humanists International.

== History ==
The Society's origins trace back to 1787, as a nonconformist congregation, led by Elhanan Winchester, rebelling against the doctrine of eternal damnation. The congregation, known as the Philadelphians or Universalists, secured their first home at Parliament Court Chapel on the eastern edge of London on 14 February 1793.

William Johnson Fox became minister of the congregation in 1817. By 1821 Fox's congregation had decided to build a new place of worship, and issued a call for "subscriptions for a new Unitarian chapel, South Place, Finsbury".

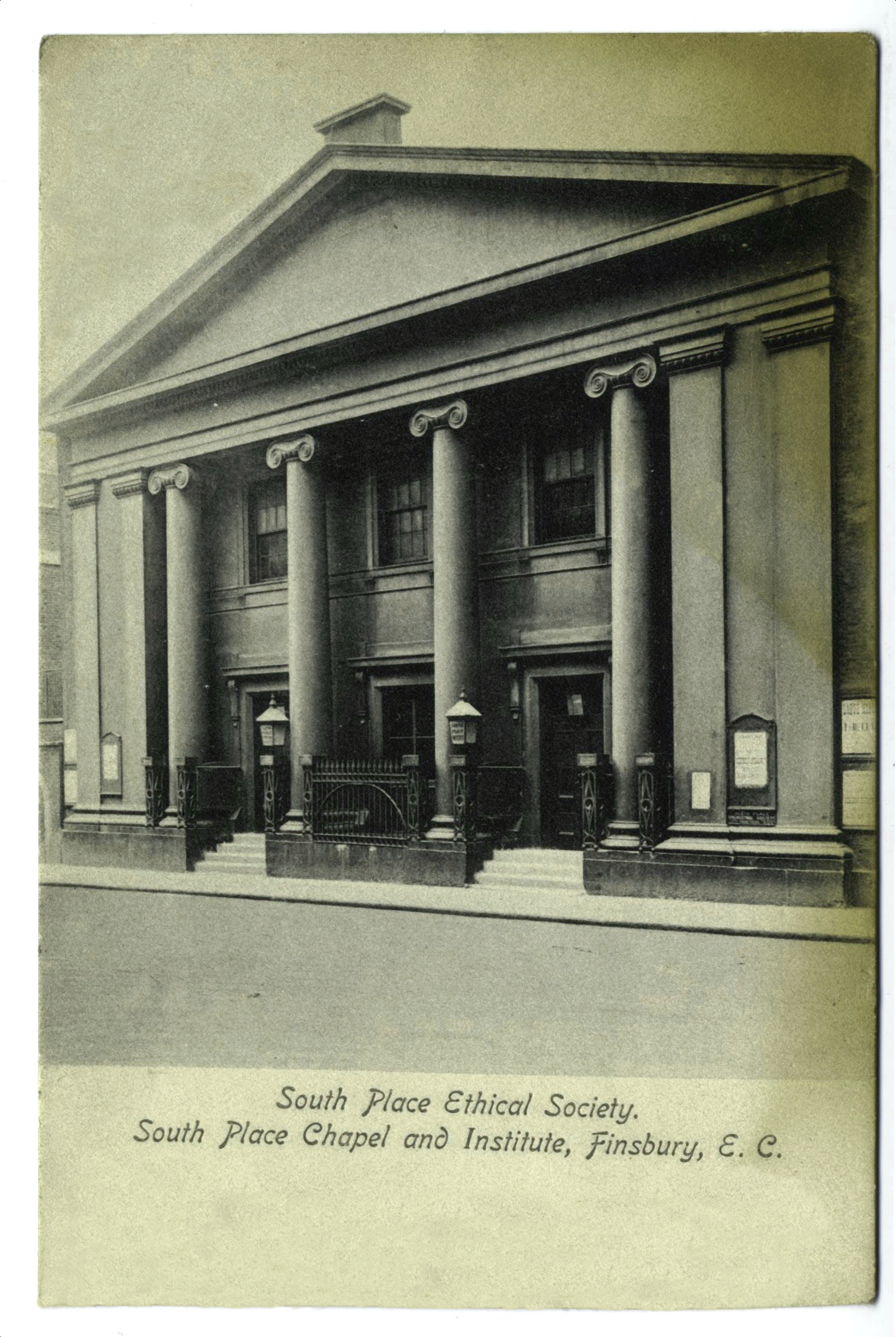
Postcard of South Place Chapel

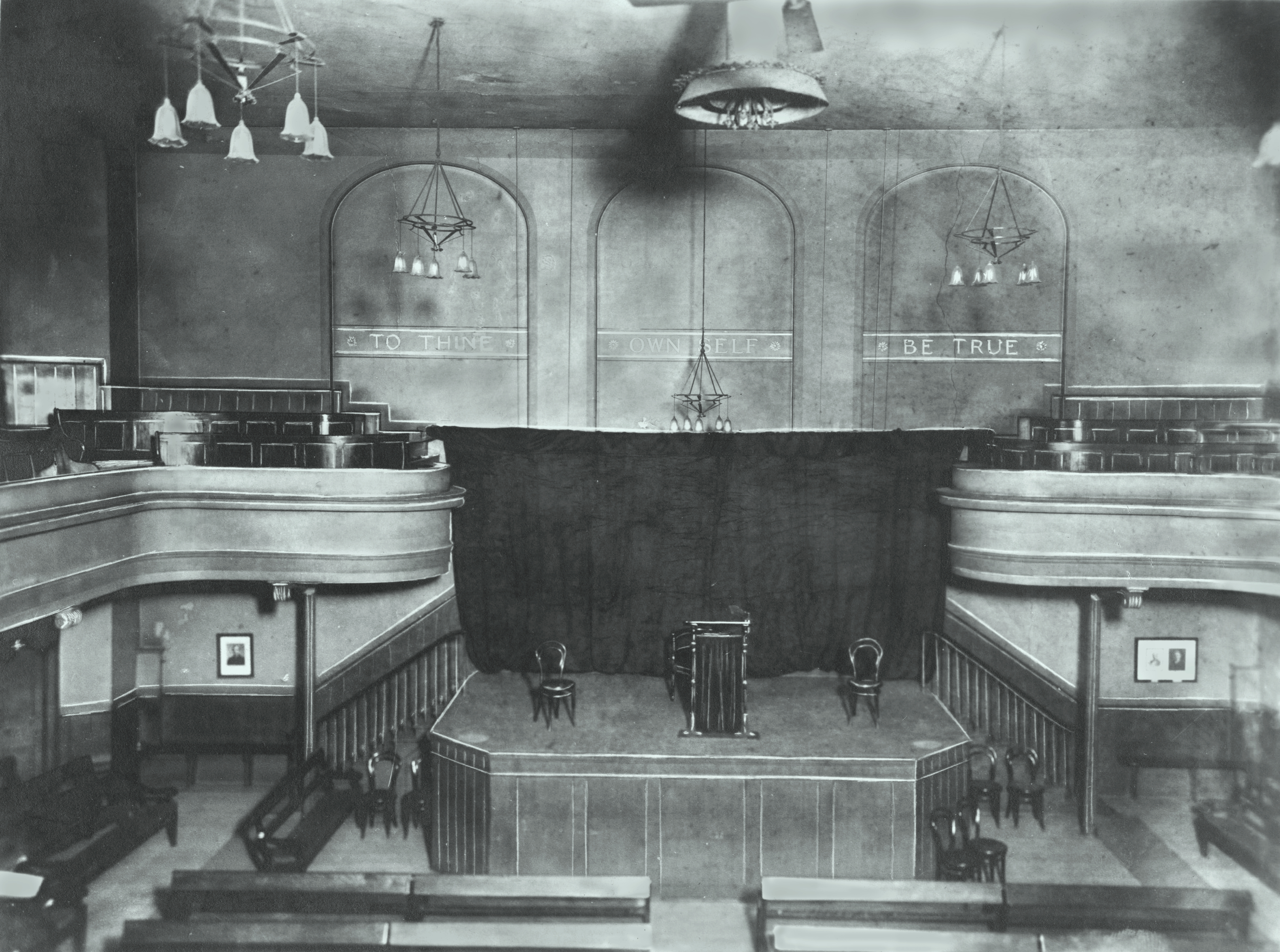
Front of interior of South Place Chapel.

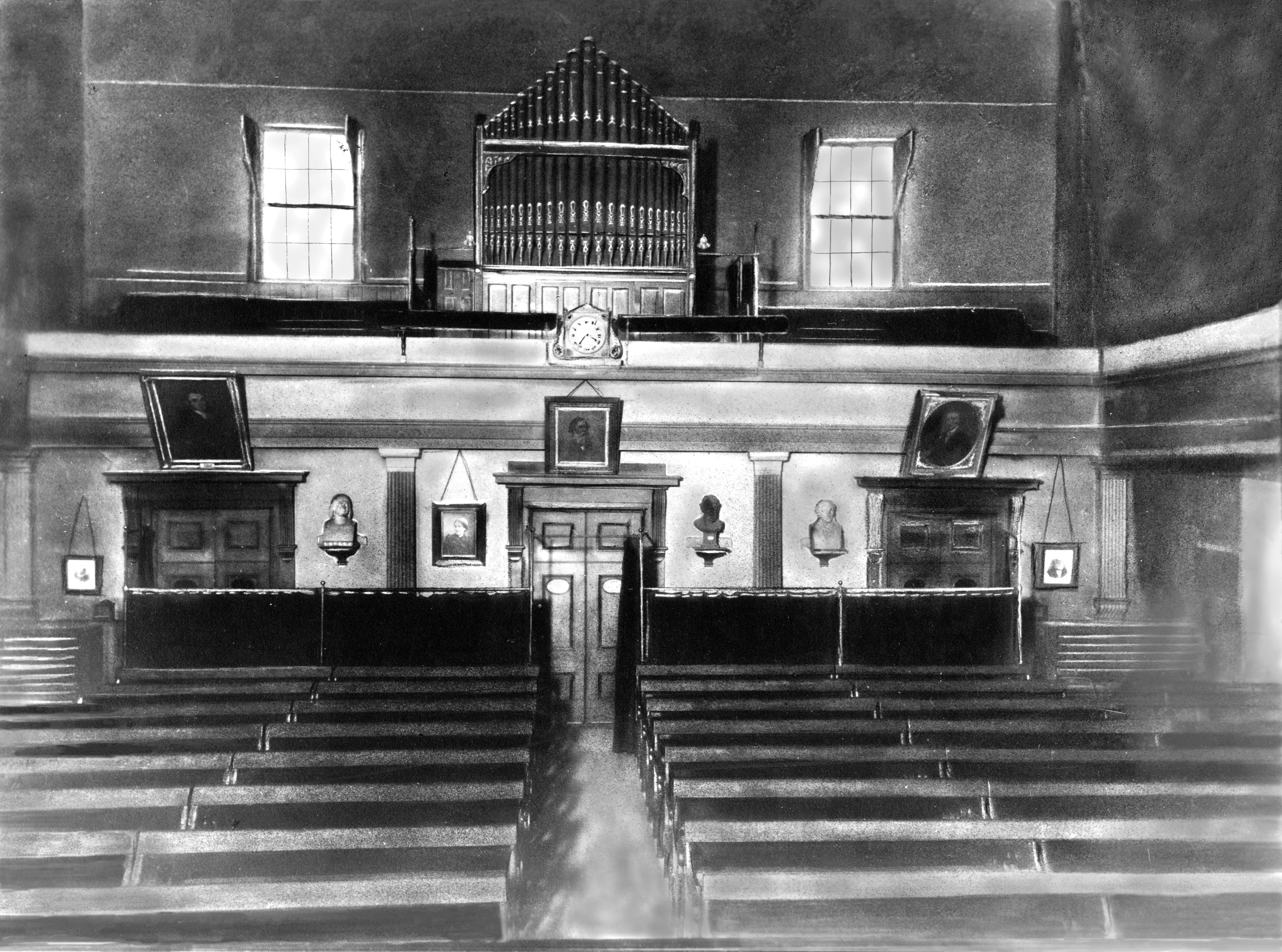
Rear of interior of South Place Chapel.

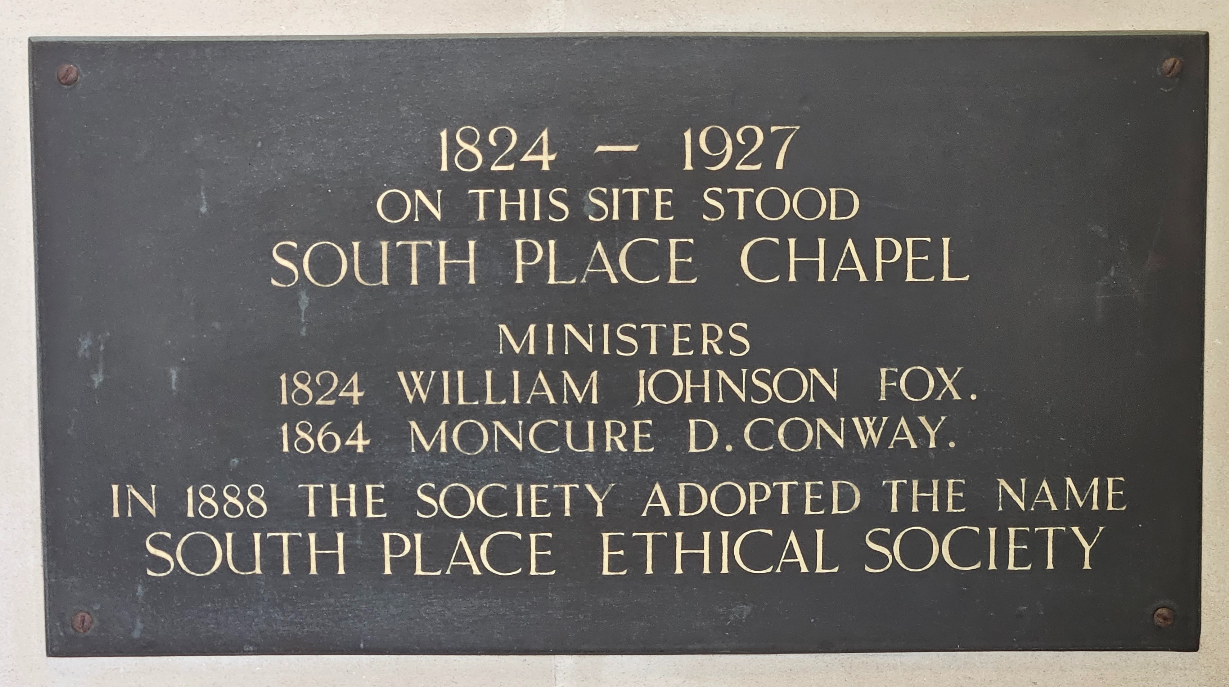
Commemorative plaque describing the South Place Chapel.

Subscribers (donors) included businessman and patron of the arts Elhanan Bicknell. In 1824 the congregation built a chapel at South Place, in the Finsbury district of central London. The chapel was repaired by John Wallen, of a family of London architects and builders. This chapel later became the home of South Place Ethical Society. The chapel stood on the site of what is now the office building known as 8 Finsbury Circus; the building has an entrance in South Place which bears a plaque commemorating the chapel.

In 1929 they built new premises, Conway Hall, at 37 (now numbered 25) Red Lion Square, in nearby Bloomsbury, on the site of a tenement, previously a factory belonging to James Perry, a pen and ink maker. Conway Hall is named after an American, Moncure D. Conway, who led the Society from 1864 to 1885 and from 1892 to 1897, during which time it moved further away from Unitarianism. Conway spent the break in his tenure in the United States, writing a biography of Thomas Paine. In 1888 the name of the Society was changed from South Place Religious Society to South Place Ethical Society (SPES) under Stanton Coit's leadership. In 1950 the SPES joined the Ethical Union. In 1969 another name change was mooted, to The South Place Humanist Society, a discussion that sociologist Colin Campbell suggests symbolized the death of the ethical movement in England.

The original name, South Place Ethical Society, was retained until 2012, when it changed to Conway Hall Ethical Society. In November 2013 Elizabeth Lutgendorff was elected Chair of the Conway Hall General Committee, becoming the youngest Chair in the society's history. On 1 August 2014 the society became a Charitable Incorporated Organisation with a new charitable object: "The advancement of study, research and education in humanist ethical principles". This replaced the previous object: "The study and dissemination of ethical principles and the cultivation of a rational religious sentiment."

== Humanist ceremonies ==
In 1935 twenty members of the Society signed a document stating that Conway Hall was their regular place of worship. It was therefore certified for marriages by the Registrar-General until 1977 when the Deputy Registrar-General ruled that the Hall could not be used for weddings under the terms of the Places of Worship Registration Act. This followed the report in the winter of 1975 of a marriage solemnised at Conway Hall. He was probably influenced by the 1970 ruling of Lord Denning, that marriages could only be solemnised in places whose principal use is for the "worship of God or [to do] reverence to a deity. Until the ruling the Society had an established tradition of performing secular funerals, memorial ceremonies and namings of children at Conway Hall.

== Sunday Concerts ==
The Sunday Concerts at Conway Hall can be traced back to 1878 when the Peoples Concert Society was formed for the purpose of "increasing the popularity of good music by means of cheap concerts". Many of these concerts were held at the South Place Institute, but in 1887 the Peoples Concert Society had to cut short its season through lack of funds. At that point the South Place Ethical Society undertook the task of organising concerts under the first Honorary Secretary Alfred J. Clements and Assistant Secretary George Hutchinson who continued to run them under the name 'South Place Sunday Concerts'. The thousandth concert was played on 20 February 1927, and the two-thousandth concert was held at the Queen Elizabeth Hall on 9 March 1969.

Clements was the Honorary Secretary for over 50 years, from 1887 to 1938. The Clements Memorial Prize for chamber music was set up in his name in 1938. Composer Richard Henry Walthew also had a long association with the Sunday Concerts, from the early 1900s until his death in 1951.

The concert series provided a rare platform for the work of women composers during its first few decades. The programming included a still small, but significant number of compositions by women compared to other concerts in London. Women composers featured in the first 1,000 concerts included Alice Verne-Bredt, sisters Amy, Annie and Jessie Grimson, Liza Lehmann, Ethel Smyth, Edith Swepstone, Josephine Troup and Maude Valérie White.

=== Hawkins Catalogue ===
Frank A. Hawkins served as Treasurer of the Sunday Concerts for 24 years from 1905 until his death in June 1929. He collected nearly 2,000 pieces of sheet music of principally classical and romantic chamber music, which were bequeathed to the Society. The collection has been catalogued by composer and instrument combination and is held on the Conway Hall premises.

== Conway Memorial Lecture ==
The Conway Memorial Lecture was inaugurated by the Society in 1910 to honour Moncure Conway who died in 1907. The decision to create the Lecture was made in 1908 and the first Lecture, The Task of Rationalism, was given by John Russell and is presumed to have been chaired by Edward Clodd.

Prominent lecturers have included Bertrand Russell, Lancelot Hogben, Stanton Coit, Joseph Needham, Edward John Thompson (1942), Jacob Bronowski, Fred Hoyle, Edmund Leach, Margaret Knight, Christopher Hill (1989), Gilbert Murray (1915), Hermann Bondi (1992), Harold Blackham, Laurens van der Post, Alex Comfort (1990), Fenner Brockway, Jonathan Miller, David Starkey, Bernard Crick, AC Grayling and Roger Penrose. No Lectures took place in 1958-1959 and between 1961-1966.

The 2014 Conway Memorial Lecture was given by Professor Lisa Jardine on 26 June 2014. It was titled "Things I Never Knew About My Father" and detailed the MI5 files kept on her father, Jacob Bronowski, who sixty years earlier had delivered that year's Conway Memorial Lecture.

== Prominent members (past and present) ==
- A. E. Heath
- Annie Besant
- Harold Blackham
- Fenner Brockway
- C. Delisle Burns
- Herbert Burrows
- Peter Cadogan
- Alfred J. Clements
- Stanton Coit
- Moncure Conway
- Andrew Copson
- Naomi Lewis
- Samuel Kerkham Ratcliffe, regular lecturer 1910s–1930s
- J. M. Robertson
- Donald Rooum
- John Saunders
- Athene Seyler
- Barbara Smoker
- Harry Snell
- Reginald Sorensen
- Dr Harry Stopes-Roe
- Nicolas Walter
- Richard Henry Walthew
- Elhanan Winchester

Samira Ahmed talks with Francesca Stavrakopoulou, Adam Rutherford and Giles Fraser at Conway Hall in 2015.

=== Other notable people associated with the Society ===
- Charles Bradlaugh, founder of the National Secular Society, and his daughter Hypatia Bradlaugh Bonner
- Sophia Dobson Collet, who contributed hymns; her brothers Charles, the Society's musical director, and Collet Dobson Collet
- Eliza Flower and her sister Sarah Fuller Flower Adams, who contributed hymns
- Peter Fribbins, C20 director of Sunday concerts formerly held at Conway Hall
- Philip Harwood, assistant minister to Fox in 1841
- Gerald Heard, lecturer from 1927
- James Hemming, in whose name the Society administers an annual prize since 2009
- Laurence Housman, C20 pacifist and socialist
- Harriet Law, C19 freethinker
- Harry Price, C20 psychic researcher, born on the site
- John Pye-Smith, C19 theologian, tutor to Fox
- Rosemary Rapaport, who launched what would become the Purcell School at the Hall in 1962
- Archibald Robertson, popular lecturer 1945–60
- Samuel Sharpe, who joined South Place Chapel in 1821
- Timothy West, C20 actor
- Anna Wheeler, 1820s speaker on women's rights

== Journal ==
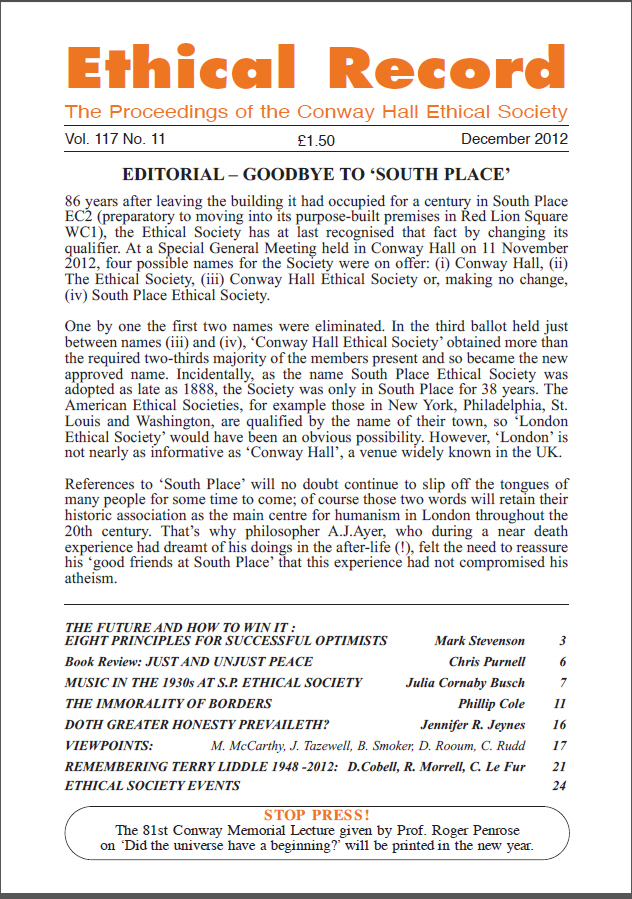
The front page of the December 2012 edition of the Ethical Record, the journal of the Conway Hall Ethical Society

The journal of the society, which records its proceedings, is the Ethical Record. The issue shown for December 2012 was volume 117, number 11. This edition outlines the procedure that took place for the historic change of name the previous month.

== Sunday Assembly ==
From 2014, Conway Hall was host to the Sunday Assembly, a popular secular service which took place on the first and third Sunday of every month until it moved to Bethnal Green in 2024.

== See also ==
- Humanists UK
- Ethical Movement
- International Humanist and Ethical Union
- National Secular Society
- Rationalist Association

== Sources ==
- Conway, Moncure Daniel. Centenary History of the South Place Society: based on four discourses given in the chapel in May and June, 1893. London/Edinburgh: Williams and Norgate, 1894
- MacKillop, Ian (1986). The British Ethical Societies. Cambridge: Cambridge University Press. ISBN 0-521-26672-6
