= Alfred Holmes (composer) =

English violinist, composer, and music educator

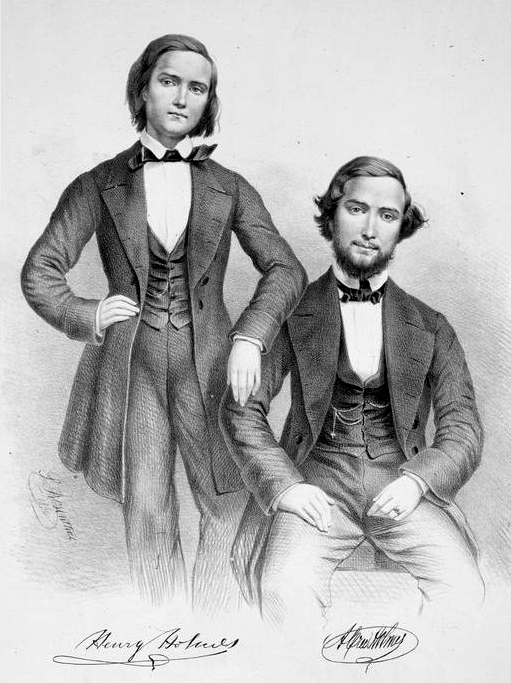
Alfred Holmes (right) and his brother Henry

Alfred Holmes (c. 1837 - 4 March 1876) was an English violinist, composer, and music educator. His compositional output includes orchestral works (including six symphonies, thought to be lost), chamber music, several works for solo violin, and some choral works.

Born in London, Holmes was the older brother of violinist and composer Henry Holmes. Both men studied the violin initially with their father and then at the Spohr's Violin School. The brothers made their professional debut together when Alfred was just 10 years old, performing in concert as duettists at the Haymarket Theatre on 13 July 1847. They then toured throughout Europe to much acclaim and violinist/composer Louis Spohr dedicated his three violin duos to them. The brothers parted ways in 1864 with Alfred settling in Paris and Henry remaining in London.

In Paris, Holmes was highly active as a composer and produced a large amount of music during his 12 years there. In April 1875 The Musical Times reported on a performance at the Crystal Palace of Jeanne d'Arc, a dramatic symphony with solo vocalists and chorus, first performed in St Peterburg. It was judged "a striking instance of mistaken ambition". His other symphonies were also given programmatic names, such as Robinhood, The Siege of Paris, Charles XII and Romeo and Juliet.

He was also active as a recitalist, chamber musician, and concert soloist; notably forming his own string quartet, and taught the violin privately. He died in Paris in 1876, in his late 30s.
