= Within and Without =

Poetic play by George MacDonald

Within and Without: A Dramatic Poem is an 1855 poetic play, the first published work of Scottish author George MacDonald. It is written mostly in unrhymed iambic pentameter, although portions are written in rhymed iambic pentameter, mixed iambic and anapestic tetrameter, and other forms. In its original printing, the piece is 183 pages long. It is prefaced with a dedicatory poem entitled "To Louisa Powell MacDonald" (MacDonald's wife).
