= Nona Liddell =

British violinist (1927–2017)

Nona Patricia Liddell MBE (9 June 1927 – 13 April 2017) was a British violinist. She was a soloist, leader of chamber music ensembles, and a teacher. For many years she was leader of the London Sinfonietta.

== Early life ==
She was born in Ealing, London in 1927, one of three sisters. Her mother had studied at the Royal College of Music. She started playing the violin aged five, and studied with Jessie Grimson, a well-known violinist in the 1890s. She attended Notting Hill High School, and was a student at the Royal Academy of Music, studying with Rowsby Woof; she performed concertos by Sibelius and Brahms with the Academy orchestra.

== Career ==
Nona Liddell's first solo appearance was in 1947 at the Proms, playing Vaughan Williams's The Lark Ascending with the BBC Symphony Orchestra under Adrian Boult. It was the first of six appearances at the Proms; in 1983 she gave the Proms premiere of Kurt Weill's Violin Concerto, with the London Sinfonietta, a work which they also recorded.

From 1957 to 1973 she was leader of the English String Quartet, and she later led the Richards Piano Quartet and London Piano Quartet. In the 1950s and 1960s she played with the English Chamber Orchestra, playing works by Benjamin Britten at the Aldeburgh Festival. She first worked with the London Sinfonietta in 1969, and was appointed leader in 1970, remaining until 1994; she often appeared with them as a soloist. She was leader of the Monteverdi Orchestra from 1973 to 1979, and appeared as guest leader of other orchestras.

She was a teacher at the Royal Academy of Music from 1978 to 1994, then at the Trinity College of Music, retiring in 2006. In 1993 she was appointed MBE, and in 1994 she was awarded the Cobbett Medal for services to chamber music.

In 1950 she married the violinist Ivor McMahon, and they had a daughter.

Nona Liddell died on 13 April 2017, aged 89.
