= Susan Lushington =

British musician and music promoter (1870–1953)

Susan Lushington MBE
- Born: 27 April 1870; Westminster, London, England
- Died: 16 February 1953 (aged 82); Petersfield, Hampshire, England
- Occupations: Musician, conductor, promoter of music
- Father: Vernon Lushington

Susan Lushington MBE (27 April 1870 – 16 February 1953) was a British musician and promoter of music. The Journal of the English Folk Dance and Song Society described her as "a woman of quite exceptional gifts, which she employed mainly in the cause of music," and as one whose "triumph was to make music alive, to show that it was not a thing apart, for the specialist only, but for the enjoyment of "as many as will"." She was made an MBE for her work with amateur musicians.

== Early life ==
Susan Lushington born on 27 April 1870, the youngest daughter of Vernon Lushington and Jane Lushington (née Mowatt). Her father Vernon Lushington was a distinguished lawyer and former member of the Cambridge Apostles. All three of Vernon and Jane's daughters were talented musicians, and received tutoring from Hubert Parry. The Lushington sisters performed not only in an intimate family setting and before small groups like the Positivists, but in public with, for example, the South Hampstead Orchestra.

After the death of their mother, the three girls were taken under the wing of Julia Stephen. Susan's sister, Kitty, was used by Virginia Woolf (Stephen's daughter) as the model for Mrs Dalloway.

== Musical activity ==
Lushington was a founding member of the Folk Song Society in 1898, which later became the English Folk Dance and Song Society. Her obituary in the group's journal noted that she had remained a supporter up to her death.

Following her father's death in 1912, she moved to Kingsley just over the Surrey border in Hampshire. There, she undertook the organizing and conducting of a choir, which she led in public performances around the district for over four decades. She also staged opera, including Fidelio in 1924 (which The Times described as "triumphant") and Handel's Theodora.

Lushington's obituary in the Journal of the English Folk Dance and Song Society stated that:

Had she wished she could no doubt have been an outstanding soloist or player of chamber music, of which she had wide knowledge and experience. Instead she devoted her talents, particularly in her middle and later years, to encouraging others to make music.

== Death and legacy ==
Lushington died on 16 February 1953, aged 82.

Her obituarist in The Journal of the English Folk Dance and Song Society described Lushington as:

a woman of leisure who lived the most strenuous of lives in pursuit of the things in which she believed, music her first but by no means her only interest.

The Musical Times wrote that hers had been a "long and persistent service in raising the standard of amateur musical performance." The Sphere credited Lushington with bringing "music and culture to those who once sat in darkness on the borders of Hampshire, Sussex and Surrey". It was "greatly due to her," they wrote, "that this pleasant part of rural England is now peculiarly music-minded and enlightened."
