= Henry Holmes (composer) =

British violinist, composer, and music educator

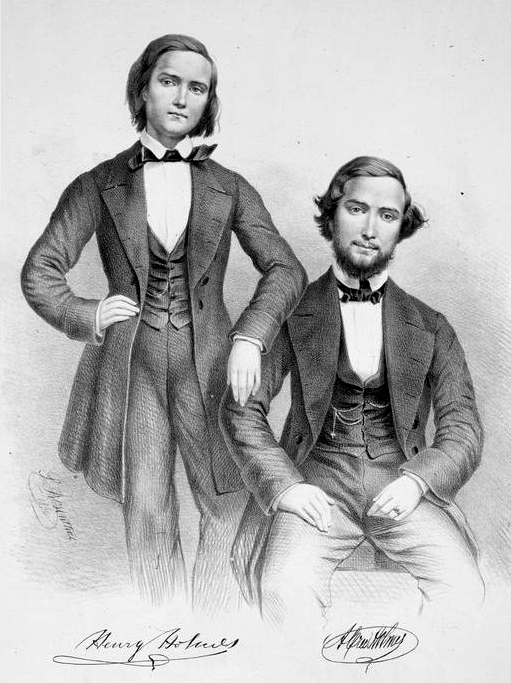
Henry Holmes (left) and his brother Alfred

Henry Holmes (7 November 1839 – 9 December 1905) was a British violinist, composer, and music educator. His compositional output includes a violin concerto, several works for solo violin, five symphonies, a concert overture, two sacred cantatas for solo voices, chorus, and orchestra, and other chamber and choral works.

== Biography ==
Born in London, Holmes was the 2 year younger brother of violinist and composer Alfred Holmes. Both men studied the violin initially with their father and then at the Spohr's Violin School. The brothers made their professional debut together when Henry was just eight years old, performing in concert as duettists at the Haymarket Theatre on 13 July 1847. They then toured throughout Europe to much acclaim and violinist/composer Louis Spohr dedicated his three violin duos to them. The brothers parted ways in 1864, with Alfred settling in Paris and Henry remaining in London.

In London, Holmes was active as a recitalist, chamber musician, and concert soloist. He taught the violin privately and at the Royal College of Music spent much of his time composing. Some of his notable pupils include Arnold Dolmetsch, Arthur Elwell Fisher, Jessie Grimson and Kathleen Parlow. In 1890 and again in 1893 a scandal relating to some female students emerged, and Holmes eventually left for San Francisco, California, where he taught the violin. He died there in 1905 at the age of 66. Some of his manuscripts were thought to have been destroyed in the 1906 earthquake.

== Composition ==
His works include two sacred cantatas – Praise Ye the Lord and Christmas Day (Gloucester, 1880), as well as O may I join the choir invisible for baritone solo, chorus and strings. Of the symphonies only the last two have survived. The first (in A, op. 32) was given at the Crystal Palace on 24 February 1872. Symphony No 4, Fraternity op. 48, dates from 1877 and No 5, Cumberland op. 57, from 1887. His Violin Concerto in F, op. 39, was first performed at Crystal Palace on 11 December 1875. Other works include two string quartets, a piano quintet op. 49, an octet for stings and two horns (1889), and songs.

== Critical reception ==
A critic in Gloucester was not impressed and made the following criticism in 1880:

The event at Gloucester was the daily appearances of Mr Henry Holmes – aesthetic, violinist, and the composer of a very mediocre cantata. The hair of this genius was crimped and his manners had been put in curl-papers. One day he was accompanied by Mrs Holmes, dressed in a tablecloth and a nimbus,

== See also ==
- Son-in-law, English novelist Edgar Jepson
