= Richard Henry Walthew =

English composer and pianist (1872–1951)

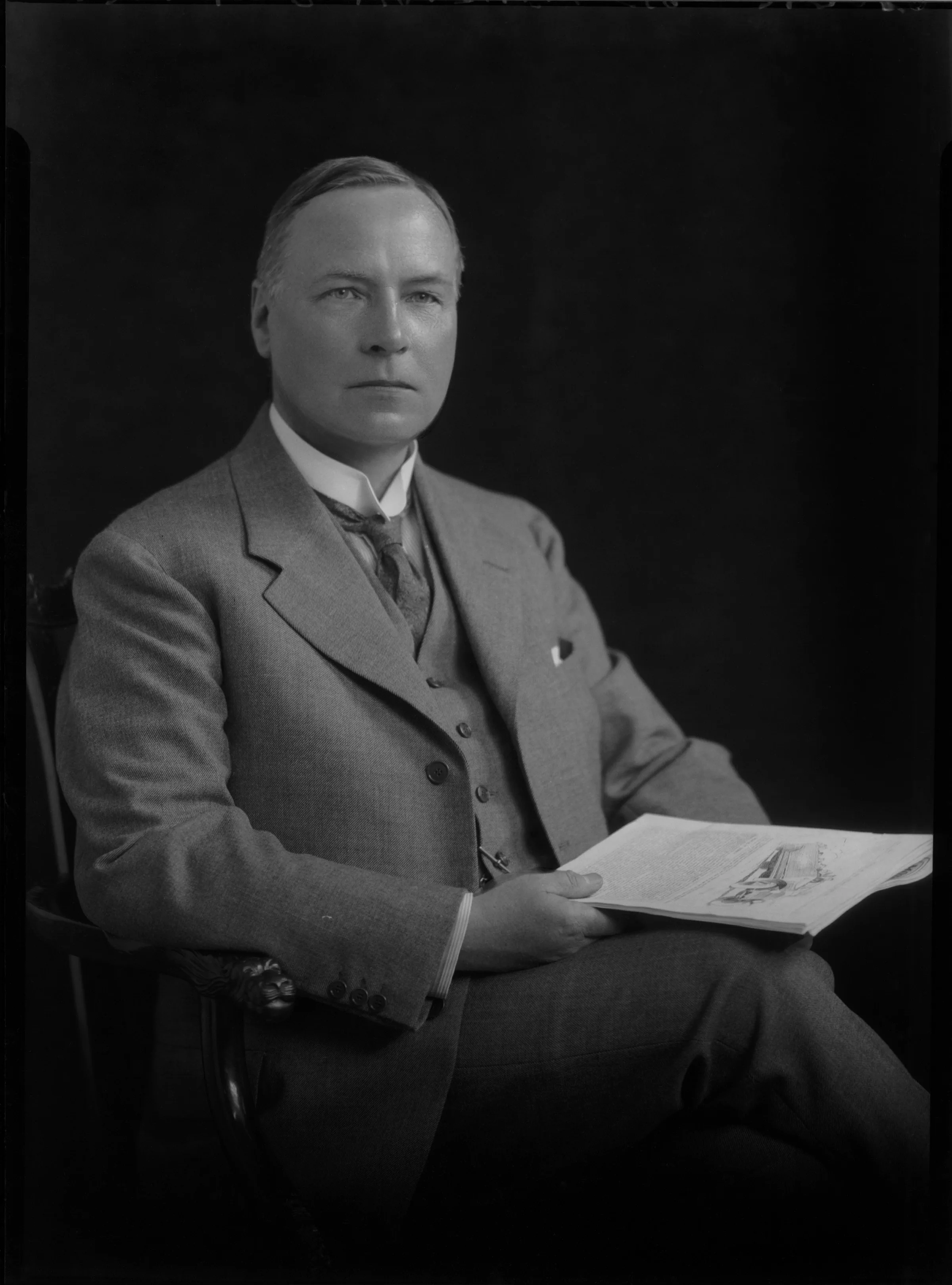
- Walthew in 1928
- Born: 4 November 1872; Islington, Middlesex, England
- Died: 14 November 1951 (aged 79); East Preston, Sussex, England
- Occupations: Composer, pianist, teacher
- Known for: Clarinet music
- Children: 1

Richard Henry Walthew, often known as Richard H. Walthew (4 November 1872 – 14 November 1951) was an English composer and pianist, and an important figure in English chamber music during the first half of the 20th century.

== Life ==
Richard Henry Walthew was born in Islington in Middlesex, the only son of Richard Frederick Walthew (1833-1910) and his wife Emily Jeffreys (1842-1930), and was educated at Islington Proprietary School. William Heath Robinson was also at the school and he remained a lifelong friend. Walthew was a pupil of Hubert Parry for four years at the Royal College of Music (1890–1894). A contemporary at the RCM was Ralph Vaughan Williams. Recognition as a composer came early, with the success of his cantata The Pied Piper (performed by the Highbury Philharmonic Society on March 20, 1893, and published by Novello) and the Piano Concerto (first performed at Queen's Hall on 3 May 1894 by the Strolling Players´ Amateur Orchestral Society with the composer as soloist).

From 1900 until 1904, Walthew was music director of Passmore Edwards Settlement. He taught the opera class at the Guildhall School of Music and was for a time conductor of the University of London Musical Society. From 1907 he was Professor of Music at The Queen's College, Harley Street.

He had a natural affinity for chamber music and a long association with the South Place Sunday Concert series for which he wrote programme notes. He conducted the orchestra there and it was where much of his chamber music was played. He also gave a series of lectures on the history and development of chamber music, which were published by Boosey and Co in 1909. Thomas Dunhill recorded his admiration for the refined, lyrical and unostentatious style of Walthew's writing, the suitability of his compositions for amateur performance, his special aptitude for writing for the piano and his energetic devotion to chamber music.

Walthew died, aged 79, in East Preston, Sussex, where he lived at 1 Clarence Drive. His son Richard Sidney Walthew also played the clarinet at many South Place concerts and went on to become principal clarinet of the City of Birmingham Orchestra in the 1930s, as well as principal clarinet of the BBC Midland Orchestra. His grandson John Walthew (1940–2017) was also a clarinettist.

== Music ==
Walthew's early works were larger scale choral and orchestral pieces such as the Clarinet and Piano Concertos and the Aladdin overture (1899). His "somewhat Gilbertian" one act operetta The Enchanted Island, loosely based on The Tempest, was composed in 1900 and received many performances, including a revival in the early 1930s with the BBC Theatre Orchestra conducted by John Ansell.

But it was with chamber music that he made the greatest impression. His String Quartet in E major, his Mosaic in Ten Pieces for clarinet and piano, and his Trio in C minor for clarinet, violin and piano were all played at a South Place concert on Sunday 25 November 1900. The Mosaic pieces were later taken up by Lionel Tertis, swapping clarinet for viola, and in 1943 Walthew provided an orchestrated version for Tertis, intended for (but in the end not played at) the 1943 Proms. (This version was recorded by Dutton Epoch in 2016).

His most successful chamber work was the single movement Phantasy Quintet for piano, violin, viola, cello and double bass, commissioned by the Worshipful Company of Musicians, dedicated to Walter Cobbett and published by Stainer and Bell in 1912. This was later revived by the composer at the marathon one thousandth South Place Sunday Concert in February 1927. There is a modern recording. Among his educational piano works, the short piece Sun and Shade was chosen as one of ten test pieces for the Daily Express national piano playing competition in 1928, and recorded as a demonstration by William Murdoch. The Prelude and Fugue (1945), originally written for strings, later transcribed for two clarinets and bassoon, has been reissued in recent times and recorded by The Trio Pleyel.

== Selected works ==
Orchestral

- Aladdin, overture and entr'actes (1899)
- Friend Fritz, overture
- The Masqueraders, orchestral suite
- Night Scenes
- Table-Music, suite in 4 movements for string orchestra
- Variations in B♭

Concertante

- Caprice Impromptu for violin and orchestra
- Concerto for clarinet and orchestra (1902)
- Concerto for piano and orchestra in E♭(1894)
- Fiammetta, concert piece for piano and orchestra
- A Mosaic in Ten Pieces for viola and orchestra (1900, orchestrated 1943)

Chamber music

- Five Diversions for violin, viola and cello
- Five Lyrical Pieces for string quartet
- Four Bagatelles for clarinet and piano (1890s)
- Four Meditations for clarinet and piano (two sets, 1897 and 1903)
- Idyll for flute and piano
- Introduction and Allegro for bassoon and piano (1900)
- Miniature Quartet for flute, oboe, clarinet and bassoon
- A Mosaic in Ten Pieces (with Dedication) for clarinet (or viola) and piano (1900)
- Phantasy-Quintet in E minor and major for violin, viola, cello, double bass and piano (1912)
- Piano Trio in G major
- Prelude and Fugue for two clarinets and bassoon
- Quartet for violin, viola, cello and piano
- Quintet for violin, viola, cello, double bass and piano
- Quintet for 2 violins, viola, cello and piano
- Serenade-Sonata in F minor for viola or violin and piano (1925)
- Short Quintet for clarinet and string quartet in Eb (1917-18)
- Sonata in D for viola and piano (1938)
- Sonata for cello and piano
- Sonata for violin and piano
- String Quartet No. 1 in E
- String Quartet No. 2 in B flat (1902)
- String Quartet No. 3 (in E flat (1917)
- String Trio No. 1
- String Trio No. 2
- Suite in F for clarinet (or viola) and piano (1899)
- Trio for two clarinets and bassoon (or bass clarinet)
- Trio in D for clarinet (or violin), horn (or bassoon) and piano (published Rosewood, 2000)
- Trio in C minor for violin, clarinet (or viola) and piano (1897)
- Triolet in E♭ for oboe, clarinet and bassoon
- Two Pieces: Regret and Conversation Galante for clarinet (or viola, or cello) and piano (1918)

Piano

- Aubade (1907)
- Sun and Shade (1928)

Choral

- The Fair Maids of February (words by May Gillington)
- John-a-Dreams, cantata (words by A Ross) (1911)
- Nocturn, for SATB choir (words by D. Donaldson)
- Ode to a Nightingale, cantata (1897)
- The Pied Piper of Hamlin, cantata for soloists, chorus and orchestra (1893)
- There sits a bird on yonder tree (words by Thomas Ingoldsby). Described as "a tasteful little anachronism".

Vocal

- Eight Songs of Richard Smekal, op 12
- Eldorado, song (setting Edgar Allan Poe) (performed at the Proms, 1902 and 1930)
- An Album of Twelve Songs (including Mistress Mine)
- The Gleaner's Slumber Song (performed at the Proms, 1896, 1899 and 1902)
- Hey Ho, the wind and the rain
- May Day
- St Agnes's Eve

Stage

- The Enchanted Island, operetta in one act (1900); libretto by R.H.U. Bloor
- The Gardeners, operetta (1906)

Literary

- Musical Amateurs, London: Musical opinion and music trade review (1904)
- The Development of Chamber Music, London: Boosey & Co. (1909)
- String Quartets London: Royal Musical Association (1915/16)
- [Beethoven's] Chamber Music, London: Music and Letters (1927)
