= Vernon Lushington =

British judge (1832–1912)

Vernon Lushington KC, (8 March 1832 – 24 January 1912), was a Positivist, Deputy Judge Advocate General, Second Secretary to the Admiralty, and was associated with the Pre-Raphaelites. He was a Cambridge Apostle.

== Biography ==
Lushington was born in Westminster, London, to Stephen and Sarah Grace (née Carr) Lushington; his twin brother was Godfrey Lushington, KCB GCMG, Permanent Under-Secretary of State of the Home Office. He was educated at East India College, Haileybury, Hertfordshire, and Trinity College, Cambridge. He became a QC, a county court judge, Secretary to the Admiralty in 1871, and Deputy Judge Advocate General from 1878 to 1912. He married Jane Mowatt, daughter of Francis Mowatt, on 28 February 1865. From 1877 to 1903 the Lushington family's country residence was Pyports, Cobham, Surrey.

With his brother Godfrey, he advocated positivist philosophy, motivated by the ideas of Auguste Comte, and was a follower of Frederic Harrison. Influenced by Frederick Denison Maurice, he joined the Working Men's College as a singing teacher, and promoter of art and music appreciation; he became part of the group that formed the first College governing Corporation in 1854. At the death of Maurice in 1872, he, with his brother, and Frederick James Furnivall, Thomas Hughes, and Richard Buckley Litchfield, became a unifying force at the College.

He was a friend to artists, authors and activists, particularly those of The Pre-Raphaelite Brotherhood and the Arts and Crafts Movement who gravitated to the Working Men's College. In 1856, it was he who first introduced Edward Burne-Jones to Dante Gabriel Rossetti in his college rooms. Rossetti used Lushington’s wife, Jane, as a model in 1865.

Lushington, a friend of William Morris, was a frequent visitor to Kelmscott Manor. He was a close friend of Leslie Stephen and his family; Stephen’s daughter Virginia (later Woolf) based her character Mrs. Dalloway on Lushington’s daughter Kitty. He was also a close friend of Working Men’s College founder Richard Buckley Litchfield and his wife Etty, daughter of Charles Darwin; the Lushingtons were regular visitors to Darwin’s Down House. As Thomas Carlyle’s friend, he edited Carlyle’s first Collected Works, (Chapman and Hall, 1858).

== Musical family ==
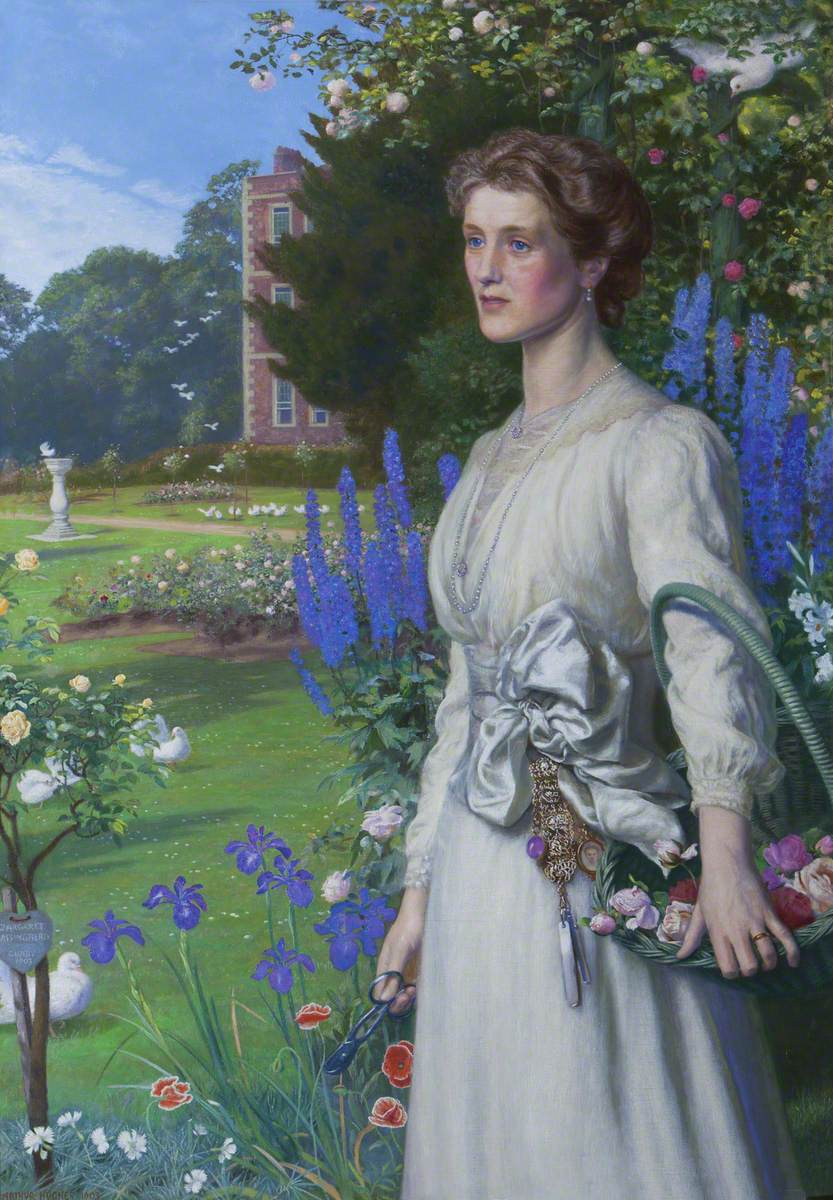
Arthur Hughes (1832-1915) - Margaret Lushington (d.1906), Mrs Stephen Langton Massingberd - 637629 - National Trust

Jane Lushington was a talented musician who sang in the Bach Choir and played the piano. Her playing was admired by Charles Darwin. She and her three daughters (Kitty, b. 1867, Margaret, b. 1869 and Susan, b. 1870) were the subject of a painting by Arthur Hughes. The Home Quartet: Mrs Vernon Lushington and her Children was first exhibited in 1883, and shows Mrs Lushington at the piano, two daughters with violins and a third with a cello. The three sisters all received tutoring from Hubert Parry and performed not only in an intimate family setting and before small groups like the Positivists, but in public with, for example, the South Hampstead Orchestra.

Jane Lushington died suddenly in 1884. Kitty married the journalist and amateur tennis player Leo Maxse in 1890 and became a well-known London society hostess: she was the model for her friend Virginia Woolf's character Mrs Dalloway. She died in 1922. Margaret married Stephen Massingberd in 1895 (who inherited Gunby Hall, Lincolnshire in 1897), and was painted again by Arthur Hughes in 1903. She died early in 1906 of peritonitis. Susan Lushington was a founding member of the Folk Song Society in 1898. She was awarded the MBE in 1943 and died in 1953.

== See also ==
List of musical families (classical music)
