= Symphony No. 2 (Brian) =

Symphony No.2 composed by Havergal Brian

- by Havergal Brian
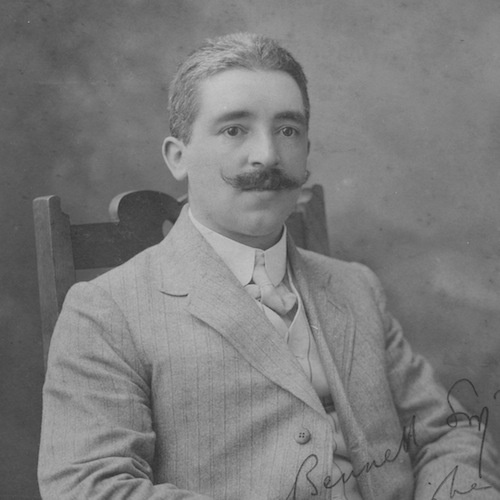
- Havergal Brian, c. 1900
- Key: E minor
- Period: Post-romanticism
- Composed: 1930–1931
- Dedication: Elfreda Brian
- Published: 1949
- Publisher: Schott and Co
- Duration: 48–53 minutes
- Movements: 4

Premiere
- Date: 19 May 1973
- Location: Brighton Dome, Brighton
- Conductor: Leslie Head
- Performers: Kensington Symphony Orchestra

The Symphony No. 2 in E minor is a symphony composed by Havergal Brian between 1930 and 1931. It was his third before he reorganized his catalogue in 1967. The work was inspired by Goethe's drama Götz von Berlichingen, each movement possibly depicting multiple aspects of the life of the character. It was premiered at the Brighton Dome in 19 May 1973, performed by the Kensington Symphony Orchestra conducted by Leslie Head. Divided in four movements linked in pairs of two and scored for large orchestra, the piece is characterized by its dissonant language based on the interval of the tritone, as well as Brian's own take on the German postromantic tradition.

== Composition ==
It was begun shortly after Brian finished editing the ambitious Gothic Symphony, as well as composing the burlesque opera The Tigers. The piece was sketched between June and September 1930, the full score being written and orchestrated between October 1930 and April 1931. It was actually his third symphony before Brian reorganized his catalogue in 1967. It was originally dedicated to Richard Strauss, (Note: Musicologist Malcolm MacDonald instead states that the work had originally no dedication) but in 1972 he changed it to his then recently deceased daughter Elfreda Brian.

In October 1931, the score was sent to Adrian Boult, who was then director of music at the BBC. After a rehearsal read-through, it was rejected on 4 November. The work was then shelved for over fifty years; Brian did not attempt new performance opportunities or stir further interest in the piece. The score was assigned for publication by Cranz and Co. in 1932, but it was cancelled the following year. The work was finally published in 1949 by Schott and Co. The symphony was not premiered until 19 May 1973 at the Dome in Brighton, six months after Brian's death. It was performed by the Kensington Symphony Orchestra under Leslie Head, reinforced with a large number of amateur musicians.

The first completely professional performance was realised on 9 March 1979, performed by the BBC Symphony Orchestra directed by Sir Charles Mackerras, played and recorded as part of a broadcast at the BBC Maida Vale Studios. This broadcast was the last in a series of radio performances of all Brian's 32 symphonies. Since then the piece has been performed a few times, being largely overshadowed by the Gothic. In a letter to BBC producer and composer Robert Simpson, Brian described the work as "in the orthodox four movements—but very unorthodox inside. The slow movement 'had' me and I thought I could never leave it. The finale is a slow Rondo—rather an Irish expression".

== Inspiration ==
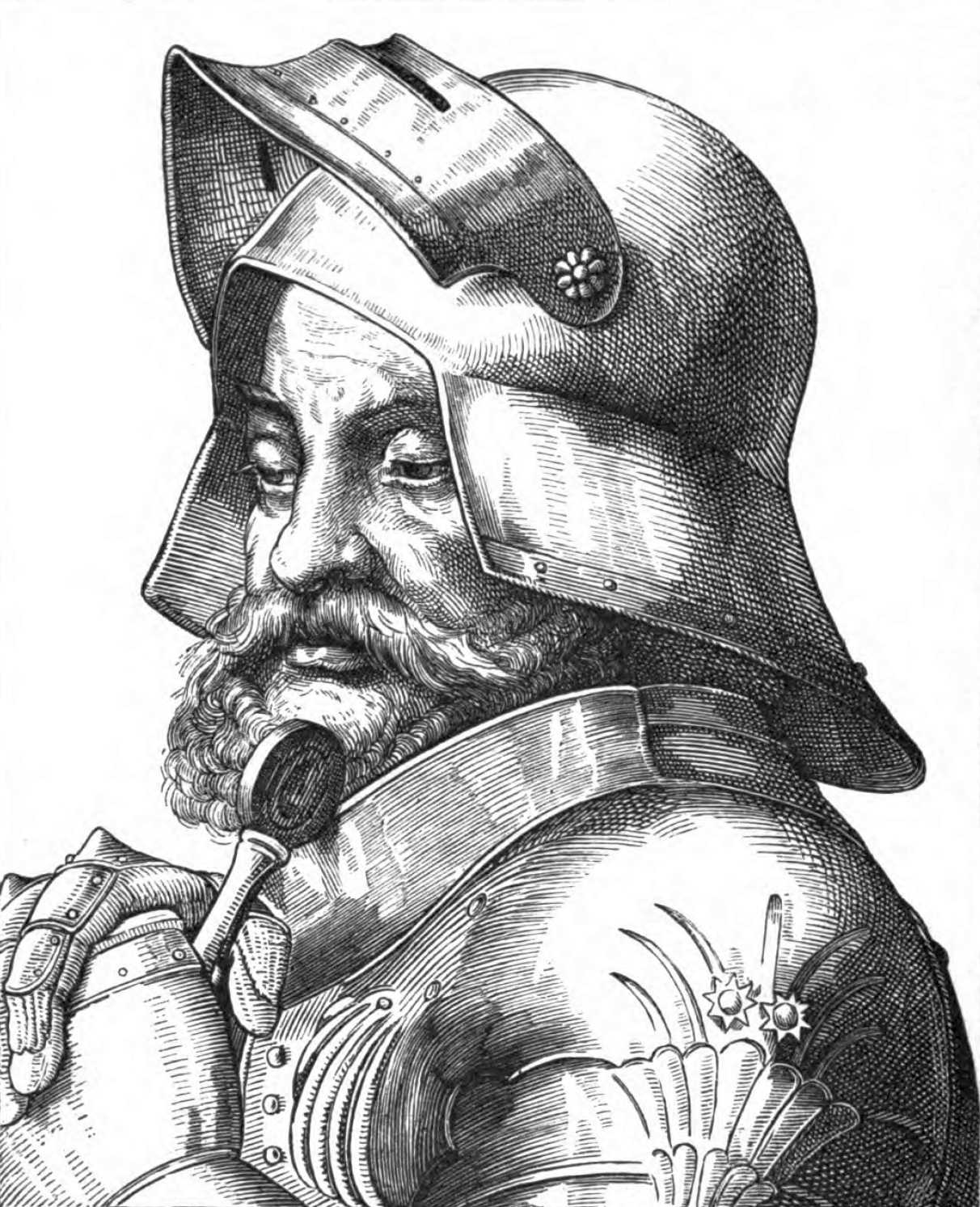
Engraving of Götz von Berlichingen by Emil Eugen Sachse (1854)

Throughout his life, Brian would hold contradicting views on his music and its supposedly extramusical content, and the second symphony reflects such opposing drives between programmatic music and absolute music. Initially, Brian conceived the symphony as almost programmatic in nature, reflecting multiple aspects of the life of the main character, Götz von Berlichingen. According to Brian's biographer Reginald Nettel, "the four movements are associated in the composer's mind with various aspects of the character of Götz. The first, his resolution; the second, his domestic piety and love of his children; the third, the smell of battle; and the fourth, his death".

From this initial conception, with close resemblances with Liszt's Faust Symphony or even Sibelius's Kullervo, Brian later on attempted to deny any extramusical programme associated with the work. However, he contradicted himself when he was interviewed by the CBC Radio in 1969, during which he referred to Symphony No. 2 as "the Götz von Berlichingen", and mentioned showing the finale to Ernest Newman and explaining that it depicted the end of the life of Götz. Brian also referred to the piece as his "Battle Symphony", as well as "Little Symphony" to distinguish it from the Gothic. The composer's last comment on the subject was contained in a letter written to Graham Hatton in 1972, the year of his death. In it, he claimed he had in mind "Man in his cosmic loneliness: ambition, loves, battles, death".

According to musicologist Malcolm MacDonald, Brian's reasons for denying this connection and for wishing his work to be viewed as "pure music" were based on fears that his compositions were misinterpreted by preconceived notions introduced by a programme. MacDonald classifies the work in a series of symphonies inspired by literature, with programmatic elements that gradually diluted over time during composition. In particular, Goethe's Faust was one of the main inspirations for the Gothic Symphony, and the writer's own life was the stimulus behind the Symphony No. 7 in C major. MacDonald also suggests an identification of the composer with heroic figures of both the past and mythology, especially those of a mature age such as Faust, Oedipus or Götz himself.

== Instrumentation ==
While not requiring forces as tremendously large as the Gothic Symphony, the instrumentation of the second is still very large and even augmented regarding the number of some instruments.

Woodwinds

4 flutes (2 doubling piccolos)
2 oboes (2 doubling cor anglaises)
4 clarinets (2 doubling bass clarinets)
4 bassoons (1 doubling contrabassoon)

Brass

16 horns (6 in movements I and II, 16 in III and 8 in IV)
4 trumpets
4 trombones
2 tubas

Percussion

3 sets of timpani
glockenspiel
xylophone
bass drum
3 snare drums
cymbals
tam-tam
bell in F

Keyboards

organ (only movements III and IV)
2 pianos (only movements III and IV)
celesta

Strings

2 harps
Violins I
Violins II
Violas
Violoncellos
Double basses

== Form ==
While it appears to be a traditional, four-movement symphony in the German postromantic tradition, Brian greatly deviates from convention, and his personal approach to the symphonic discourse only shares superficial elements with other composers. The symphony is divided in four movements linked in pairs of two, an unusual approach that has a precedent in Saint-Saëns' Organ Symphony. A similar comparison can be drawn with Brian's own Gothic Symphony, with its first three movements ending with attacca markings.

1. Adagio solenne – allegro assai – attacca
2. Andante sostenuto e espressivo molto
3. Scherzo. Allegro assai – attacca
4. Lento maestoso e mesto

The language of the symphony is described as "modern in sound" by composer Damian Rees. The harmonic scheme of the work is diffuse, and its tonal centres are unstable and distant. Overall, the harmonic language is reminiscent of Jean Sibelius, particularly his Symphony No. 4. Like Sibelius, Brian makes extensive use of the tritone, which is present in almost every major theme in the piece, and serves as a basis for the whole symphony. Rees also notes that other composers, such as Richard Wagner and Arnold Schoenberg had used the tritone as a form of "stable" harmony, such as in the latter's Chamber Symphony No. 1. Graham Saxby in turn highlights Brian's tendency to produce sudden changes in mood, often at climaxes, through the unexpected juxtaposition of material. Each movement also ends with a fade-out coda with which the music disintegrates, creating what Harold Truscott has called an "anti-symphony" rather than a "symphony".

=== I. Adagio solenne – allegro assai ===
External audio
- Performed by the Moscow Symphony Orchestra under Anthony Rowe
- I. Adagio solenne – allegro assai (section 1)
- I. Adagio solenne – allegro assai (section 2)
- I. Adagio solenne – allegro assai (section 3)
- I. Adagio solenne – allegro assai (section 4)

The first movement is broadly described as sonata form by both Saxby and MacDonald, although the latter notes its substantial deviations from the norm. It begins with a slow introduction, a pianissimo timpani roll is soon joined by woodwinds in a fifth chord in E. Underneath cellos and basses introduce a heavily chromatic theme through pizzicati, which contains several motives and ideas that will be developed later on. Most notably the aforementioned tritone contained in the notes B–A♯–F. This introduction then progresses as a kind of passacaglia, which grows more restless and tense as it leads to the main allegro.

The main subject is passionate and highly unstable, subdivided in three themes that near constantly modulate from the A minor starting point. Strings then expose the more lyrical second subject in E major, which is also subdivided in three themes. Fast string figures juxtaposed with slow woodwind chords lead to the next section.

The development of the material is short but complex, marked by the striking use of counterpoint and polytonality. It initially focuses on the main subject before being interrupted by an eerie passage, with the introduction theme reappearing on flute, oboe, glockenspiel and harp. This abrupt contrast leads into the development of the second subject, beginning with a solo from the cello. The material is then recapitulated with varied orchestrations. The music then reaches an intensely dissonant and dramatic polyphonic climax.

It ends with a slow fade-out coda that links with the next movement, with a permutation of the tritone appearing ominously on the brass. Saxby points out the influence of Edward Elgar in Brian's music, particularly of his Symphony No. 2.

=== II. Andante sostenuto e espressivo molto ===
External audio
- Performed by the Moscow Symphony Orchestra under Anthony Rowe
- II. Andante sostenuto e espressivo molto (section 1)
- II. Andante sostenuto e espressivo molto (section 2)
- II. Andante sostenuto e espressivo molto (section 3)
- II. Andante sostenuto e espressivo molto (section 4)
- II. Andante sostenuto e espressivo molto (section 5)

The second movement is described as the most free in form by MacDonald and by Saxby as a loose rondo in the A–B–A'–C–A"–Coda Scheme. It opens with an expressive, almost funereal main theme presented by solo cor anglais, which passes to oboe supported by a chromatic woodwind counterpoint, creating a haunting atmosphere that remains for the whole movement. This material is continuously transformed in a way reminiscent of Brahms's developing variation technique.

After reaching a dissonant climax, a second theme (or episode) appears on woodwinds. It is interrupted by a menacing march episode, in which the tritone motive appears on the basses. It abruptly ends with a recapitulation of the second theme on clarinet over a richly scored accompaniment. The third theme (or episode) starts with dramatic trumpets and tubas fanfares, which combines a variation of the opening's main theme with motives from the first movement. It is followed by cadenza-like violin solo that grows into a polyphonic climax.

A transition then leads to the biggest peak yet heard, in which fragments of all themes are combined. The main theme is then poignantly recapitulated by the cor anglais, leading to a fade-out coda. Saxby highlights the influence of Claude Debussy in the formal design of the andante, as well as Strauss and Schoenberg in the development procedures.

=== III. Scherzo. Allegro assai ===
External audio
- Performed by the Moscow Symphony Orchestra under Anthony Rowe
- III. Allegro assai (section 1)
- III. Allegro assai (section 2)

The third movement is also very free in form, described by MacDonald as an orchestral toccata and by Saxby as the very apotheosis of the ostinato. It begins with a figure on harp and muted violins and violas, followed by an ostinato on pianos and timpani. Horns then introduce a long-drawn hunting theme, tonally ambiguous and juxtaposed with the rhythmic ostinato figures that are gradually added. Unusually for a scherzo, we find no trio nor contrasting sections.

Brian employs sixteen horns divided in four separate groups, each having different material and timbral qualities. This antiphonal unravelling of the theme and ostinati becomes increasingly complex and virtuosic, reaching a massive polytonal climax of the whole orchestra reinforced by the organ. A slow coda features a recapitulation of the theme by solo horn before the music fragments. A dissonant transition chord from woodwinds leads to the finale. MacDonald notes that sixteen horns are also employed by Wagner in both Tannhäuser and Lohengrin, as well by Strauss in his Alpine Symphony. On the other hand, Saxby points to the scherzo of the Gothic Symphony as a precedent.

=== IV. Lento maestoso e mesto ===
External audio
- Performed by the Moscow Symphony Orchestra under Anthony Rowe
- IV. Lento maestoso e mesto (section 1)
- IV. Lento maestoso e mesto (section 2)
- IV. Lento maestoso e mesto (section 3)
- IV. Lento maestoso e mesto (section 4)

The fourth movement is generally described as a funeral march, structured as a slow rondo by both Brian and MacDonald, while Saxby suggests its form is closer to the sonata rondo as found in some of Mahler's symphonies.

It opens with a menacing gesture from violas and cellos, which signals the start of each section throughout the movement. An expressive and poignant main theme is introduced by both clarinet and bass clarinet, taking the rhythm of a slow march. As most of the material of the symphony, it is also derived from the tritone motive. The funeral march then unfolds until reaching the first episode, in which brass and timpani lead to a tremendous climax. The march then continues, slowly transforming as it goes on.

The second episode consists of an elegy for strings, full of an Elgarian nobility as it grows into a passionate climax. This in turn leads to the work's biggest climax yet, built on all this material. The main theme is then recapitulated by solo clarinet. A fade-out coda again fragments the music into an E minor cadence. The work then ends with nearly the same 5th chord in which it had begun. MacDonald mentions the movement's evocation of Siegfried's funeral march from Wagner's Götterdämmerung. Saxby also includes the funeral march from Beethoven's Eroica Symphony as a predecessor.

== Assessment ==
The symphony has been praised in multiple reviews found in publications such as MusicWeb International, Fanfare, Ritmo, and the 2010 edition of The Penguin Guide to Recorded Classical Music. The scherzo has been the most praised part of the symphony, as reflected in some of the aforementioned reviews, as well as in others found at Classics Today, Gramophone and MusicWeb International.

An Allmusic review by Blair Sanderson is more negative, remarking the difficult nature of the piece due to its "heavy textures, vagueness of purpose, and profoundly brooding character". The "dense harmonies, meandering melodies, subdued interludes, and inconsequential developmental sections" are also criticised.

== Recordings ==
Conductor	Orchestra	Recording Date	Formats	Labels	Catalogue ID	References
Sir Charles Mackerras (falsely credited as Ernest Weir)	BBC Symphony Orchestra (falsely credited as Dresden Symphony Orchestra)	1979, remastered 2012 and rereleased 2013	LP / CD / Digital	Aries Records (Bootleg recording) / Klassic Haus Restorations (2013)	Aries LP-1631 / KHCD-2013-001	
Anthony Rowe	Moscow Symphony Orchestra	1996, released in 1998, rereleased in 2007	CD / Digital	Marco Polo (1998) / Naxos Records (2007)	8.223790 / 8.570506	
Martyn Brabbins	Royal Scottish National Orchestra	2015, released 2016	CD / Digital	Dutton Epoch	CDLX 7330	
