= Unicorn-Kanchana =

- Founded: 1968
- Founder: John Goldsmith
- Distributor: Heritage Records
- Genre: Classical music, film soundtracks
- Country of origin: United Kingdom

Unicorn-Kanchana is a British independent record label founded by John Goldsmith (died 2020), a former London police officer. Originally known as Unicorn Records, the name Kanchana was added later. In Hindu and Buddhist mythology, the female name Kanchana means an Apsara, a spirit of the clouds and waters.

The label specialised mainly in classical music and film soundtracks. Artists signed to the label included Andrzej Panufnik, Jascha Horenstein, Jennifer Bate, Henry Herford and Peter Maxwell Davies. The label also released several recordings of lesser-known British composers, including Havergal Brian, George Dyson and Cipriani Potter. Additionally, under licence it released four discs of recordings made in London by the American composer Alan Hovhaness, thereby introducing the composer to a European audience.

The Leicestershire Schools Symphony Orchestra made the very first commercial recording of Havergal Brian's music. Symphonies Nos. 10 and 21, conducted by James Loughran and Eric Pinkett respectively, were recorded at the De Monfort Hall, Leicester in 1972. The producer was Robert Simpson and the LP was released by Unicorn Records to great critical acclaim in 1973. A special edition of the television programme Aquarius gave considerable coverage to the recording session (see video links below).

Bernard Herrmann was also a Unicorn artist and released several albums of his own film soundtracks as well as a symphony and his opera Wuthering Heights, based on the novel of the same name.

Horenstein's Mahler recordings (Symphonies 1, 3 and 6) were released by the label, as well as his readings of the music of Carl Nielsen, the recording of the last-named's 5th Symphony being the first recording of the new label.

In 1970, Unicorn recorded Andrzej Panufnik's Universal Prayer in Westminster Cathedral. Composed for four vocal soloists, a choir, three harps and organ, it was conducted by Leopold Stokowski in the presence of the composer.

The television composer Laurie Johnson recorded film scores on Unicorn-Kanchana, as well as an album of his own music from The Avengers, The New Avengers and The Professionals. Like Herrmann, he also released a symphony (for jazz orchestra, subtitled Synthesis) for the label.

Unicorn-Kanchana was one of the labels which released recordings using Ambisonic recording technology during the 1970s and 1980s. One of the most celebrated was Laurie Johnson's re-recording of Herrmann's North by Northwest score.

The label ceased producing its own CDs in the 1990s. Since then, much of its classical output has been re-released on the budget Regis label, the film music being licensed to several other small labels. In 2008 several long-unavailable Unicorn recordings started to re-emerge via music download sites.

In 2017 an agreement with intellectual rights company, Treasure Island Music, enabled Heritage Records to begin manufacture and distribution of Unicorn-Kanchana's catalogue once more.

== Videos ==
The Unknown Warrior A documentary featuring the LSSO recording session of symphonies Nos. 10 and 21 and an informal interview with the composer

- part 1
- part 2
- part 3

== See also ==
- List of record labels
