= James Loughran =

Scottish conductor (1931–2024)

James Loughran CBE
- Loughran conducting the Bamberg Symphony orchestra, Stadthalle Bayreuth, 1982
- Born: 30 June 1931
- Died: 19 June 2024 (aged 92)
- Education: St Aloysius' College, Glasgow
- Occupations: Conductor; répétiteur
- Years active: 1958–2000s
- Style: Classical
- Spouses: Nancy Coggan (m. 1961; div. 1983) Ludmila Navratil (m. 1985)
- Children: 2, including Angus Loughran

James Loughran CBE (30 June 1931 – 19 June 2024) was a Scottish conductor, the first British conductor to be appointed chief of a major German orchestra.

== Early life ==
Educated at St Aloysius' College, Glasgow, Loughran conducted at school and afterwards, while studying economics and law. When he sought the advice of one of the Scottish National Orchestra's conductors, Karl Rankl, on how to develop his musical career, Rankl suggested that he gain experience by working in the German opera house system. Loughran therefore obtained a position as a répétiteur with the Bonn Opera in 1958, where he came into contact with Peter Maag and subsequently worked in the same capacity with the Netherlands Opera and in Italy, in Milan.

Loughran began his conducting career with the Bournemouth Symphony Orchestra after winning the 1961 Philharmonia Orchestra's Conducting Competition judged by Otto Klemperer, Carlo Maria Giulini, Sir Adrian Boult and the orchestra. In Bournemouth, he worked alongside the orchestra's chief conductor, Constantin Silvestri. Loughran made his Covent Garden debut with Verdi's Aida in 1964, which led to Benjamin Britten inviting him to be music director of the English Opera Group.

== Career ==
Loughran was chief conductor of the BBC Scottish Symphony Orchestra (BBC SSO) from 1965 to 1971. He subsequently became principal conductor of The Hallé as of the 1971–72 season, succeeding Sir John Barbirolli. He held the post until 1983, and was conductor laureate of The Hallé from 1983 to 1991.

Other work in the UK included conducting the first concert of the newly formed Scottish Chamber Orchestra in 1974. He also led the Last Night of the Proms five times, between 1977 and 1984. He was principal guest conductor of the BBC National Orchestra of Wales from 1987 to 1990.

Outside of the UK, Loughran was principal conductor of the Bamberg Symphony orchestra from 1979 to 1983, the first British conductor to be appointed chief of a major German orchestra. In Denmark, he was chief conductor of the Aarhus Symphony Orchestra from 1996 to 2003. He made his American debut in 1972, conducting the New York Philharmonic. He was appointed Permanent Guest Conductor of the Japan Philharmonic Orchestra in 1980, and Honorary Conductor from 2006. Loughran was active as guest conductor with many of the world's major orchestras, including the Royal Liverpool Philharmonic Orchestra, Philharmonia, London Philharmonic, Royal Philharmonic, Los Angeles Philharmonic, Dallas Symphony, Munich Philharmonic, RSO Berlin, Vienna Symphony, Stockholm Philharmonic, Finnish Radio Symphony, Stuttgart Radio Symphony, and others.

He became a Freeman of the City of London in 1991, and in the 2010 New Year Honours he was appointed a Commander of the Order of the British Empire (CBE). He was also President of Edinburgh Youth Orchestra and a Fellow of the Royal Scottish Academy of Music & Drama.

== Recordings ==
Loughran's Hallé recording of Holst's The Planets won a Gold Disc from EMI, and there was universal praise for his Beethoven, Brahms and Elgar cycles of symphonies. Other recordings include the Brahms piano concertos with John Lill and Violin Concerto with Maurice Hasson, Saint-Saëns's piano concertos Nos. 2 and 4 with Idil Biret, Hector Berlioz's Symphonie fantastique and Sergei Rachmaninoff's Symphony No. 2, as well as notable readings of Walton's Belshazzar's Feast and works by the Strauss family. He also recorded the complete Beethoven symphonies with the London Symphony Orchestra as part of the European Broadcasting Union's Beethoven Bicentenary celebrations in 1970.

Loughran also conducted Havergal Brian's Symphony No. 10 for the very first commercial recording of any of Brian's music, with the Leicestershire Schools Symphony Orchestra. The recording was released on Unicorn Records in 1973, along with Brian's Symphony No. 21, conducted by Eric Pinkett. The recording session also received television coverage on the programme Aquarius, under the title "The Unknown Warrior".

== Personal life ==
Loughran was married twice. His first marriage was to Nancy Coggan in 1961, and there were two sons, including the sports commentator Angus Loughran. The marriage ended in divorce in 1983. He married, secondly, to Ludmila Navratil, in 1985. He died from complications of dementia on 19 June 2024, at the age of 92.

Cultural offices
Preceded by Norman Del Mar	Principal Conductor, BBC Scottish Symphony Orchestra; 1965–1971	Succeeded by Christopher Seaman
Preceded by István Kertész	Chief Conductor, Bamberg Symphony Orchestra; 1979–1983	Succeeded by Witold Rowicki
Preceded by Eri Klas	Principal Conductor, Aarhus Symfoniorkester; 1996–2003	Succeeded by Giancarlo Andretta
