= Eric Shilling =

English baritone and producer (1920–2006)

Eric Shilling (12 October 1920 – 15 February 2006) was an English opera singer and producer, long associated with English National Opera, whose career encompassed a wide variety of parts, bringing to each a mastery of stagecraft. He was married to the soprano Erica Johns, and they have two sons the oldest is George Shilling. He was born and died in London.

== Life and career ==
Shilling learnt about singing from his father, who sang music-hall songs at home. He was educated at Leyton Sixth Form College. He became hooked on opera after a conducted tour around Sadler's Wells followed by the evening performance of The Marriage of Figaro, the first opera he'd seen. He began work as an accounts clerk for Anglo-Iranian Oil, where a colleague who was a part-time student at the Guildhall School of Music and Drama suggested that he enrol there for vocal training.

After just one term of part-time lessons the outbreak of war resulted in Anglo-Iranian staff being evacuated to South Wales. When back in London, Shilling was drafted into rescue services digging out bombed buildings on 24-hour shifts, one on, one off. He managed to fit in lessons with Walter Hyde, who taught him the basis of baritone technique and interpretation. Three years later he won a scholarship to the Royal College of Music under Clive Carey. Shilling made his debut as Marullo in Rigoletto at Sadler's Wells Theatre in 1945, then Schaunard (La Boheme) and Dr Caius in Sir John in Love. Leaving the College in 1948, his first professional engagement was in the play This Way to the Tomb by Ronald Duncan with incidental music by Britten, the songs performed by Shilling. He followed this with several years touring the UK and abroad with a small company ‘Intimate Opera’, also producing their piano-accompanied repertoire. He learnt most of the craft of opera singing through Intimate Opera, and later said "There was nothing like it for teaching you the groundwork of craft", adding, "with no chorus or orchestral support a tremendous responsibility falls on the three singers, and you learn your craft in double-quick time".

In 1959 he joined Sadler's Wells Opera for an operetta season where he appeared as Colonel Frank in Die Fledermaus alternating with Frederick Sharp, with Vilém Tauský conducting; on tour he also played Frosch. The following year saw his first Jupiter in Orpheus in the Underworld notching up 150 performances in two years with 121 more in Australia in 1962. He sang many comic and dramatic roles, from Jupiter in Orpheus in the Underworld (notching up 150 performances in two years, with 121 more in Australia in 1962),) to Rostov in the British stage premiere of War and Peace in 1972. He created roles in Our Man in Havana (Hawthorne, 1963), The Violins of Saint-Jacques (1966), A Penny for a Song (1967), The Story of Vasco (1974) and Clarissa (1990). He appeared at the Proms in 1975 (Frank in Die Fledermaus) and 1976 (Colonel Calverley in Patience), and took part in the complete BBC broadcast of Havergal Brian's The Tigers in 1983. Shilling took the role of the lawyer Kolenaty in The Makropoulos Case from its first British performance in 1964 for 25 years.

After taking part in the SWO Iolanthe when Gilbert and Sullivan works came out of copyright he sang all that repertoire (apart from Princess Ida): on stage (including guest appearances in Dallas), on the radio, and on television (the Learned Judge in Trial by Jury). He appeared in a BBC studio recording of Offenbach's Un mari à la porte in 1971, and also in 1976 the musical Liza of Lambeth at the Shaftesbury Theatre.

He retired at the end of the 1993–94 season with Benoit and Alcindoro in La Boheme at the Coliseum after almost 50 years on the stage. Grove noted Shilling's impeccable diction and mastery of stagecraft. Later in his career he took lecture recitals of opera with his wife around Essex and taught at his alma mater, the Royal College of Music. He was the castaway on Desert Island Discs in 1981 where his choices ranged from Billy Williams, through Verdi and Strauss to Bach's St Matthew Passion and Schubert's String Quintet, with the favourite 'Deh vieni non tardar' from The Marriage of Figaro by Mozart. His chosen book was the Albatross Book of Living Verse compiled by Louis Untermeyer (published by William Collins).

== Recordings and television ==
Shilling took part in recordings of Béatrice et Bénédict (Somarone), La Vie parisienne (Gondremarck), Orpheus in the Underworld (Jupiter), Irmelin (the Old Knight), The Tigers (Regimental Sergeant Major), Nelson (Lord Minto) and Iolanthe (Lord Chancellor). He was the narrator in the Supraphon recording of Peter and the Wolf with the Czech Philharmonic Orchestra conducted by Karel Ančerl. He also appeared in several Gilbert and Sullivan productions on radio and television.

Appearances on BBC television included The Telephone (Ben) by Menotti in 1951, Three's Company (Mr Three) and Christmas Story (Tiger Tim) both by Antony Hopkins in 1954, The Barber of Seville (Figaro) by Rossini for Children's Television in 1956, The Two Shy People (Victor) by Rota in 1961, Iolanthe (Lord Chancellor) by Sullivan in 1964, Die Fledermaus (Colonel Frank) by Strauss in 1966 and 1971, The Count of Luxembourg (Grand Duke Basil) by Lehar in 1967, an Omnibus programme about a Victorian musical evening at home (1970), The Visitation (Held) by Schuller in 1971, and The Merry Widow (Baron Zeta) in 1980. For ITV he appeared in Trial by Jury (Judge) in 1974.
