= LSSO =

LSSO may refer to:

- Leicestershire Schools Symphony Orchestra, youth orchestra based in Leicester
- London Schools Symphony Orchestra, youth orchestra based in London
