= Pinkett =

Pinkett is a surname. Notable people with the surname include:

- Allen Pinkett (born 1964), former professional American football player
- Eric Pinkett (1911–1979), the founder of the Leicestershire Schools Symphony Orchestra
- Harold T. Pinkett (1914–2001), the first African-American archivist employed at the National Archives of the United States
- Jada Pinkett Smith (born 1971), American actress, producer, director, author, singer-songwriter, and businesswoman
- Mary Pinkett (1962–2003), the first black New York City councilwoman
- Randal Pinkett (born 1971), business consultant who was 2005 winner of The Apprentice
- Ward Pinkett (1906–1937), American jazz trumpeter
