= Angus Loughran =

British sports commentator and pundit

Angus Loughran (born 24 November 1965, Glasgow) is a British sports commentator and pundit. He appears regularly on television, newspapers and websites, usually concentrating on horse racing and football, such as The Daily Telegraph and online bookmaker Easyodds, writing tipping sections every day. He has also provided English language football commentary for Eurosport and ESPN. He is currently a commentator for BT Sport on their coverage of the Bundesliga, UEFA Champions League and UEFA Europa League.

He first worked for Ladbrokes, providing racing commentary into their betting shops, but rose to fame as "Statto", the resident statistician on the BBC Two television show Fantasy Football League. Clad in a dressing gown and pyjamas, he would stand in the corner of the set and provide facts and figures on each of the guests' fantasy football teams, while being made fun of by hosts Frank Skinner and David Baddiel. He also appeared in the Rowan Atkinson comedy film Bean in 1997 and the Mel Smith directed Blackball in 2003.

He is the son of conductor James Loughran and was educated at St. Ambrose College in Hale Barns and Ampleforth College. He is a fan of Manchester United F.C.

As a 15-year-old, Loughran was involved in an elaborate prank on Chris Tavaré during a cricket Test match:

"The crowd of just 1,444 showed their disgust, crying "boring, boring, boring" repeatedly as Tavaré and England continued to bat on and on. Before too long, a 15-year-old boy appeared at the wicket holding a stool, apparently indicating to the batsman that he must need a rest after batting for such a long time.

The boy in question was the young Angus Loughran, or Fantasy Football's Statto as he would later become known. The interruption entertained the agitated fans, and even amused officials so much that Loughran was offered life membership to the Oval. And he also made a profit during his one-man protest.

His friends, thinking reasonably that he wouldn't be able to pull off such a stunt, invested in Loughran's bet, meaning that there was £300 riding on the wager. "I figured I'd probably be arrested but the fine would only be £100, so I'd still be £200 up," Loughran later revealed, showing a nose for a money-making scheme even from an early age."

He was declared bankrupt at a hearing at Manchester County Court on 4 February 2008 due to large debts owed to Sporting Index. The bankruptcy was annulled in April 2008 when he presented an IVA to his creditors.
