= Alexander Walker (conductor) =

British conductor (born 1973)

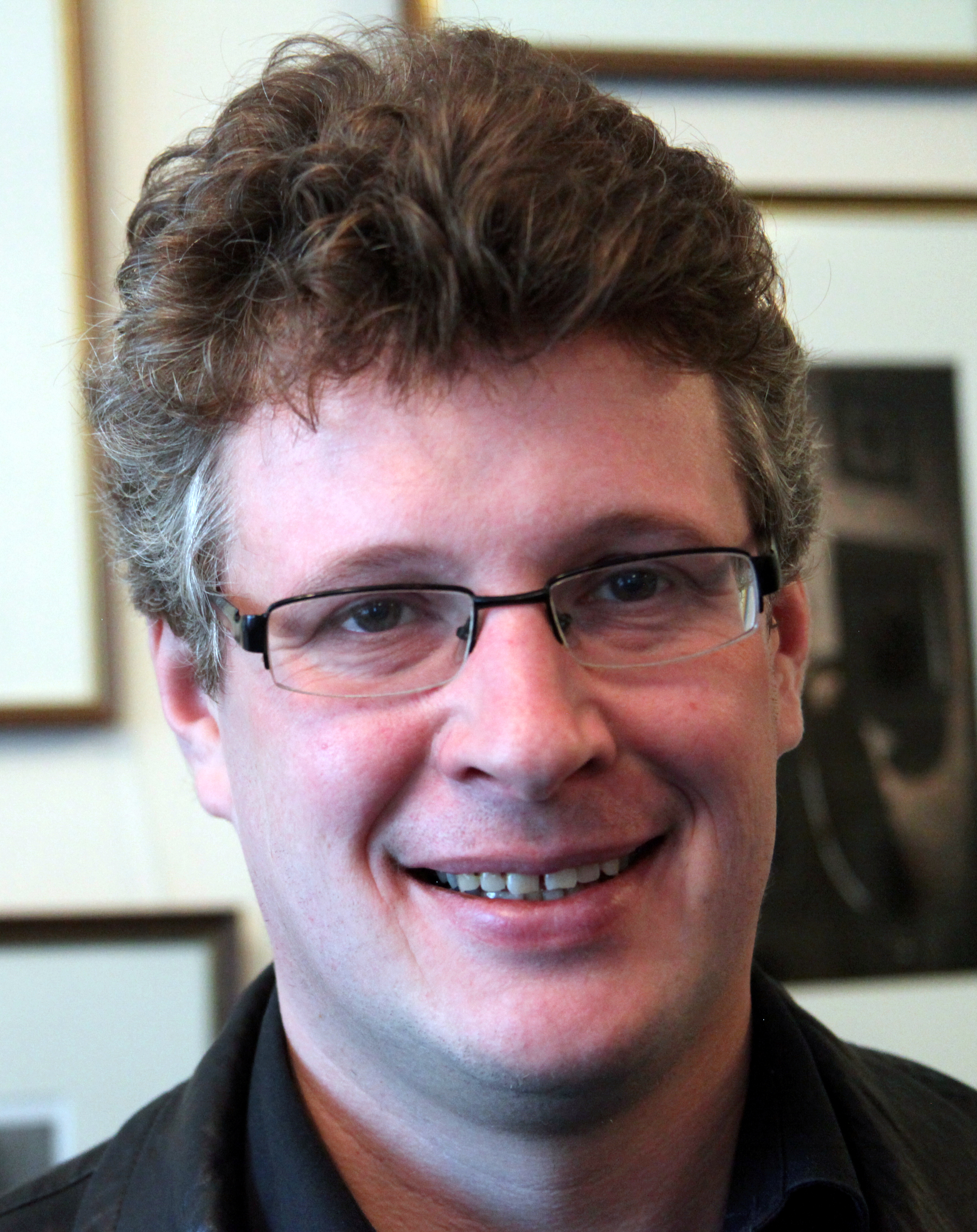
Alexander Walker

Alexander Walker (born 1973) is a British conductor.

== Biography ==
=== Education ===
Walker studied at Bristol University, the Guildhall School of Music and Drama, London and at St Petersburg Conservatoire with Ilya Musin.

=== Career ===
In 2000/01 Walker conducted the English Touring Opera's production of the Magic Flute, and on 27 November 2004 the Chelsea Opera Group (UK) in Glinka's A Life for the Tsar at the Queen Elizabeth Hall. In November 2005 he conducted the Prague Philharmonia, and in the winter season 2005/6 Walker conducted three performances of The Nutcracker for the Royal Opera House, Covent Garden, and Swan Lake in 2009 for the Finnish National Ballet. On 4 July 2010 he conducted the BBC Philharmonic Orchestra, and in 2011 a concert with the Royal Philharmonic Orchestra. He appeared at the Oundle International Festival in 2011 where he conducted the premiere of Prophet and Loss by Julian Grant. In October 2011 he conducted a Gershwin Gala with the Russian Philharmonic. In 2012 Walker conducted the English Chamber Orchestra. and a production of the Nutcracker at the Norwegian National Opera and Ballet. On 19 April 2015 he conducted the New Russia State Symphony Orchestra. In 2017 he was awarded the Elgar Medal by the Elgar Society for championing the composer's music internationally in countries including Belarus, Russia, Poland, Turkey and Romania.

Walker has been Music Director of the Berkshire Youth Orchestra, The Purcell School Symphony Orchestra, The Norfolk Symphony Orchestra, the Northampton Symphony Orchestra, and is conductor for Musica Viva in Moscow. He is Music Director of the Abingdon and District Musical Society. Walker teaches conducting at Trinity Laban Conservatoire of Music and Dance and conducts the Sinfonia and Symphony Orchestra at the Junior Academy of the Royal Academy of Music, as well as teaching conducting at the Royal Academy of Music. He conducts the Surrey County Youth Orchestra.

== Discography ==
- Ignatz Waghalter.: Violin Concerto / Rhapsody / Violin Sonata (RPO, Trynkos, Latsabidze, A. Walker) Naxos 2012
- Havergal Brian: Symphonies Nos. 22, 23, 24 / English Suite No. 1 (New Russia State Symphony, A. Walker) Naxos 2013
- Havergal Brian: Symphonies Nos. 6, 28, 29 and 31 (New Russia State Symphony, A. Walker) Naxos 2015
- Ignatz Waghalter: New World Suite / Mandragola: Overture and Intermezzo / Masaryk's Peace March (New Russia State Symphony, A. Walker) Naxos 2015
- Robin Walker: Great Rock is Dead / Odysseus on Ogygia: Prelude / The Stone King / The Stone Maker (Novaya Rossiya Symphony Orchestra, A. Walker) Toccata Classics 2016
- Arnold Griller: Ensemble Seventeen / Distant Villages / Concerto for Clarinet and Strings, Vol. 1 (Musica Viva, A. Walker) Toccata Classics 2017
- Havergal Brian: Symphonies Nos. 8, 21, 26, (New Russia State Symphony, A. Walker) Naxos 2017
- Arnold Griller: Scherzoid / Symphony / Introduction, Cakewalk and Allegro for piano and orchestra / Rhapsody Concertante, Vol. 2 (Musica Viva, Martirosian, A. Walker) Toccata Classics 2018
- Havergal Brian: The Tinker's Wedding: Overture / Symphonies Nos. 7, 16, (New Russia State Symphony, A. Walker) Naxos 2019
