= Bryan Fairfax =

Australian music conductor (1925–2014)

Lancelot Beresford Bryan Fairfax (8 February 1925 – 11 January 2014) was an Australian conductor based in the United Kingdom, who was known for his championing of little known or neglected works.

He was strongly associated with the works of Havergal Brian, and he conducted the world premiere of Brian's Symphony No. 1, Gothic in 1961. Brian's Symphony No. 18 was written especially for Fairfax and the semi-professional Polyphonia Orchestra he founded. His UK premieres include major works by Gustav Mahler, Dmitri Shostakovich, Carl Nielsen, Sergei Rachmaninoff, Franz Schmidt and Percy Grainger. His conducting style has been likened to that of Sir Adrian Boult and Vernon Handley.

== Biography ==
Fairfax was born in St Kilda, Victoria in 1925. He studied at the New South Wales Conservatorium of Music and later in London under Max Rostal, and then became a violinist with the Hallé Orchestra in 1954 for two years. He continued his conducting studies in Vienna with Hans Swarowsky in 1956–57.

In 1961 he founded the Polyphonia Orchestra, a semi-professional ensemble, as a vehicle for the performance of rarely heard or new music. On 28 February of that year, he directed the Polyphonia in the first live public performance in Britain of Gustav Mahler's massive Symphony No. 3, at St Pancras Town Hall (it had earlier been heard in the UK only on BBC Radio broadcasts). The performance received highly complimentary reviews.

On 24 June 1961, Fairfax led the Polyphonia in the premiere of Havergal Brian's gargantuan Gothic Symphony, which had been completed 34 years earlier in 1927, but previous efforts to perform the work had stalled numerous times due to the colossal forces it requires. This premiere was held in the Central Hall, Westminster, and it was a precursor to the first fully professional performance, on 30 October 1966 at the Royal Albert Hall, under Sir Adrian Boult, which the composer attended. Although Havergal Brian did not attend Bryan Fairfax's earlier performance, to express his gratitude he wrote his Symphony No. 18 especially for the Polyphonia Orchestra's forces and dedicated the work to Fairfax. Bryan Fairfax conducted the Polyphonia Orchestra in the world premiere of the 18th Symphony in February 1962, at St. Pancras Town Hall. In June 1975 he directed the first professional performance, a BBC studio recording broadcast.

In 1962 he directed the first performances in Britain of Dmitri Shostakovich's Symphony No. 3, The First of May and Percy Grainger's ballet The Warriors, and the first public performance in Britain of Carl Nielsen's Sinfonia espansiva.

On 22 November 1963, the composer's 50th birthday, he conducted a concert performance of Benjamin Britten's opera Gloriana, which was the opera's first performance in any form since its inaugural production in 1953.

On 2 January 1964, Fairfax led the Polyphonia Orchestra in the first British performance of Sergei Rachmaninoff's Symphony No. 1 in D minor.

On 24 May 1966, he led the Polyphonia and other forces in the UK premiere of the work Franz Schmidt considered his masterpiece, The Book with Seven Seals.

Fairfax was the organiser of the Percy Grainger Festival held in London in 1970, and along with William McKie successfully lobbied the Australian government for financial assistance.

On 21 May 1971 at Queen Elizabeth Hall, London, he conducted the premiere performance of the Hourglass Suite by Cyril Scott.

In February 1972 at the Royal Festival Hall, Fairfax conducted the only professional production of Sir Arthur Bliss's opera The Olympians since its 1949 premiere, which is now available on CD.

In 1977 he became the conductor of the Harrow Choral Society.

His students include Garry Humphreys.

He died on 11 January 2014, aged 88.
