= The Tigers (opera) =

Opera by Havergal Brian

The Tigers is a burlesque opera in a prologue and three acts by Havergal Brian. Written in 1917–1919 and 1927–1929, it was lost, then recovered in 1977, and premiered in 1983 when it was recorded on 3–8 January 1983 at BBC Maida Vale Studios. It was broadcast on BBC Radio 3 on 3 May 1983. The plot concerns a regiment nicknamed The Tigers.

== Instrumentation ==
The Tigers is scored for a large orchestra,

=== Offstage ===
The score includes an ensemble of offstage instruments used only in act 2.

- 2 Piccolos
- 4 Flutes
- 3 Snare Drums
- Bass Drum

=== Woodwind ===
- 1 Harmonica
- 3 Flutes (one doubling piccolo)
- 3 Oboes (one doubling English Horn)
- 3 B♭ Clarinets (one doubling E♭ Clarinet, one doubling Bass Clarinet)
- 3 Bassoons (one doubling Contrabassoon)

=== Brass ===
- 6 French Horns
- 1 Bugle in C
- 4 B♭ Trumpets
- 4 Trombones
- 1 Euphonium
- 5 Tubas (only one is used in acts I and III)

=== Keyboards ===
- Pipe organ
- Celesta

=== Percussion ===
timpani, cymbal, bass drum, snare drum, long drum, triangle, tambourine, tam-tam, thunder machine, whip, sleigh bells, town crier's bell, police bell, ship's siren, telephone bell, police whistle, motor horn, fire bells, tubular bells in Bb, C, D, Eb, xylophone, glockenspiel, 2 vibraphones and a tubaphone

=== Strings ===
- 2 harps
- I Violin
- II Violin
- Viola
- Cellos
- Double basses

This is the first time the vibraphone is used in an orchestral score.

== Premiere and recording ==
- Teresa Cahill (soprano); Alison Hargan (soprano); Marilyn Hill Smith (soprano); Ameral Gunson (mezzo); Anne-Marie Owens (contralto); Paul Crook (tenor); Harry Nicoll (tenor); John Winfield (tenor); Kenneth Woollam (tenor); Ian Caddy (baritone); Malcolm Donnelly (baritone); Henry Herford (baritone); Alan Opie (baritone); Alan Watt (baritone); Norman Welsby (baritone); Richard Angas (bass-baritone); Eric Shilling (bass–baritone); Dennis Wicks (bass) BBC Singers; BBC Symphony Orchestra conducted Lionel Friend
