= Fantasy Football League (TV series) =

British television comedy programme

- Genre: Comedy
- Presented by: David Baddiel; Frank Skinner; Elis James; Matt Lucas
- Starring: Angus Loughran; Jeff Astle; Lee Trundle; Andrew Mensah
- Country of origin: United Kingdom
- Original language: English
- No. of series: 7
- No. of episodes: 105

Production
- Producer: Avalon Television
- Production location: Riverside Studios
- Running time: 30 minutes

Original release
- Network: BBC2; ITV (specials)
- Release: 14 January 1994 – 10 May 1996
- Network: Sky Max
- Release: 29 September 2022 – 22 March 2024

Related
- Baddiel and Skinner Unplanned

Fantasy Football League is an English television comedy programme originally hosted by David Baddiel and Frank Skinner. It was inspired by the Fantasy Football phenomenon which started in the early 1990s and followed on from a BBC Radio 5 programme hosted by Dominik Diamond, although the radio and TV versions overlapped by several months. Three series were broadcast from 14 January 1994 to 10 May 1996 (followed by episodes during Euro 96). The show then moved to ITV for live specials on alternate nights throughout the 1998 World Cup and then again through Euro 2004.

After the show ended, Baddiel and Skinner went on to produce a series of podcasts for The Times, documenting their experiences while travelling across Germany at the 2006 World Cup. The success of these led to the duo being signed by Absolute Radio, where they hosted a similar show from South Africa during the 2010 World Cup.

In 2022, a revival of the show was commissioned to be broadcast on Sky Max with new hosts Elis James and Matt Lucas. This ended in 2024, after two series consisting of 24 episodes.

== Format ==
The format was originally heavily reliant on an actual fantasy football league, made up of teams picked by regular guest celebrities at the point that the game became popular in the mid-1990s.

In the 'kitchen' area stood the third regular on the show, Angus Loughran, referred to only as "Statto". Clad only in a dressing gown and pyjamas, he would dispense footballing facts and statistics on demand, particularly in the early shows when the fantasy league element was strongest. He was the butt of many of Frank and David's jokes, and was often made fun of for being apparently dull and naive, but quickly became an audience favourite (with chants of "Statto! Statto!" becoming common later in the run). In the Sky era, comedian and BT Sport presenter Andrew Mensah takes Loughran's former role.

The Sky series featured celebrity guests including Keir Starmer, Michael Sheen, Brian Cox, Trevor McDonald, Maisie Adam and Jennifer Saunders.

== Controversy ==
Skinner and Baddiel performed a sketch with toys, using a Mr. Potato Head to portray Nottingham Forest manager Frank Clark and a toy footballer with a (genuine) pineapple on top to portray Forest striker Jason Lee and his unusual hairstyle. This led to Lee suffering torrents of abuse from fans at actual matches, including chants like "He's got a pineapple, on his head, he's got a big pineapple, on his head!" (to the tune of "He's Got the Whole World in His Hands" by Laurie London). Some sketches also featured Baddiel in blackface.

In response to the racism, Lee said: "I'd ask them if they realised the significance of what they were doing. It was, looking back, a form of bullying. I work in equalities now, and it can affect different people in different ways. I don't think people appreciate the possible harm it can cause. Not everyone has the make-up to deal with that, and they shouldn't have to." Baddiel has since admitted that his portrayal of Lee was "part of a very bad racist tradition". In an interview with The Guardian in July 2022, Skinner said "When Dave walked out from makeup that night, I still don’t know why one or both of us or someone there didn’t say what the fuck is happening?" He also added, "Looking back, it was a bullying campaign. And it's awful. And yeah, I'm ashamed of it." Baddiel finally apologised to Lee to his face later that year, though Lee questioned why it had taken Baddiel so long to do so.

In 2022, Sky apologised for a sketch in which Elis James portrayed Nottingham Forest manager Steve Cooper with a wonky eye, apparently mocking his appearance.
