= Leicestershire Schools Symphony Orchestra =

The Leicestershire Schools Symphony Orchestra (LSSO) is a youth orchestra based in Leicester, England. It was founded by Timothy Mason. The players, aged between 15 and 18, are all drawn from secondary schools in the county of Leicestershire and the City of Leicester.

== History ==
The Leicestershire County School of Music was the first of its kind, founded in 1948 by the county's first Music Adviser, Eric Pinkett O.B.E., with the backing of the Leicestershire education committee headed up by the visionary Director of Education, Stuart Mason.

By the mid 1960s, Eric Pinkett – supported by the patronage of Sir Michael Tippett – had managed to put the LSSO on the UK musical map. The orchestra also established an international reputation due to its regular concert tours of major European cities, an annual tradition that started with visits to Essen in 1953, The Hague in 1954, Aarhus in 1955 and Oslo in 1956.

== Repertoire ==
Over the years the orchestra's repertoire has included a number of specially commissioned works by composers such as Michael Tippett (The Shires Suite), David Bedford (Alleluia Timpanis), Bryan Kelly (Sancho Panza, Sinfonia Concertante), Anthony Milner (Te Deum), Alan Ridout (Concertante Music, Symphony No.2, Funeral Games for a Greek Warrior), Brian Bonsor (The Pied Piper of Hamelin), William Mathias (Sinfonietta), Herbert Baumann (Variations on an Old English Folk Song), and Herbert Chappell (Overture Panache).

== Conductors ==
Since the late 1950s, many illustrious musicians have conducted the orchestra and these have included Michael Tippett, Alan Ridout, Arthur Bliss, Adrian Boult, Malcolm Arnold, Charles Groves, Norman Del Mar, George Weldon, Rudolf Schwarz, James Loughran, László Heltay, Herbert Chappell, Bryan Kelly, Alan Ridout, Herbert Baumann, Douglas Cameron, Lesley Woodgate, Stanford Robinson, Oivin Fjelstad, Bernard Keeffe, Alexander Goehr, Russell Burgess, Uri Segal, Havelock Nelson, Willy Gohl, Dan Vogel, Maurice Handford, Pierre Cao, Myung-whun Chung, Douglas Young, William Mathias, Martyn Brabbins, Stuart Johnson and André Previn.

== Broadcasts ==
The orchestra has broadcast regularly on radio and television both at home and abroad, including an appearance in the BBC Omnibus programme The Other LSO with André Previn rehearsing them in works by Glinka, Beethoven and Rachmaninov and a series of programmes for BBC television in the mid 1980s called Music Time (see video links below). Several television programmes have featured Sir Michael Tippett and the orchestra and in 1968 a chamber group drawn from the LSSO appeared in the television series Sounds Exciting to perform Herbert Chappell's Dead in Tune with the composer conducting and Robin Ray narrating. In 1970 a studio recording of Dead in Tune was also released by Argo. Other commercial recordings by the LSSO have been issued on Pye, Argo, CBS, Unicorn, Cameo Classics, Virgin and Performance labels.

== Concerts ==
The orchestra has given concerts in some of Europe's major concert halls including the Musikverein in Vienna, the Mozarteum concert hall in Salzburg, the Beethovenhalle in Bonn, the Haydnsaal in Schloss Esterházy (Eisenstadt, Austria), the Palais des Beaux Arts in Brussels, the Berliner Philharmonie, the Robert-Schumann-Saal at the Museum Kunstpalast in Düsseldorf, the Hans-Sachs-Haus in Gelsenkirchen, the Fairfield Halls in Croydon, and London's Royal Festival Hall. In a press review of one of the concerts given by the orchestra during their 1969 tour of Germany with Sir Michael Tippett and Richard Rodney Bennett, the LSSO was hailed as "Britain's best cultural export".

Review

The famous, well-travelled Leicestershire Schools Symphony Orchestra – an orchestra of schoolchildren under the direction of the internationally known composer Sir Michael Tippett – in the Philharmonie, played difficult pieces with such precision that we could only wonder at their technical boldness. Many professional orchestras of ours might envy the stark clarity of the brass as it was displayed in Hindemith's Metamorphoses and Gershwin's Rhapsody in Blue. The trumpeter alone was worth the visit. Great applause from the young people of Berlin.

— Berliner Zeitschrift, 15 September 1969

== Havergal Brian recordings ==
The LSSO made the very first commercial recording of Havergal Brian's music for the Unicorn and CBS labels in 1972 and 1974 respectively.

== After Eric Pinkett's retirement ==
Eric Pinkett retired from his post in 1976 and died in 1979. His memorial concert, held at the De Montfort Hall, Leicester in 1980, was conducted by Norman Del Mar, who had worked regularly with the orchestra since 1966 at home and abroad, notably their concert in the Vienna Musikverein in 1968. Eric Pinkett was followed by Peter G. Fletcher (1976–84), Stuart Johnson (1984–93), Don Blakeson (1993–97), Russell Parry (1997–2009), Andrew Bound (2009-2013), Peter Dunkley (2013-2015) and Richard Laing (2015–2017). The orchestra is currently conducted by Dan Watson.

== See also ==
- List of youth orchestras
