= Ignatz Waghalter =

Polish-German composer and conductor

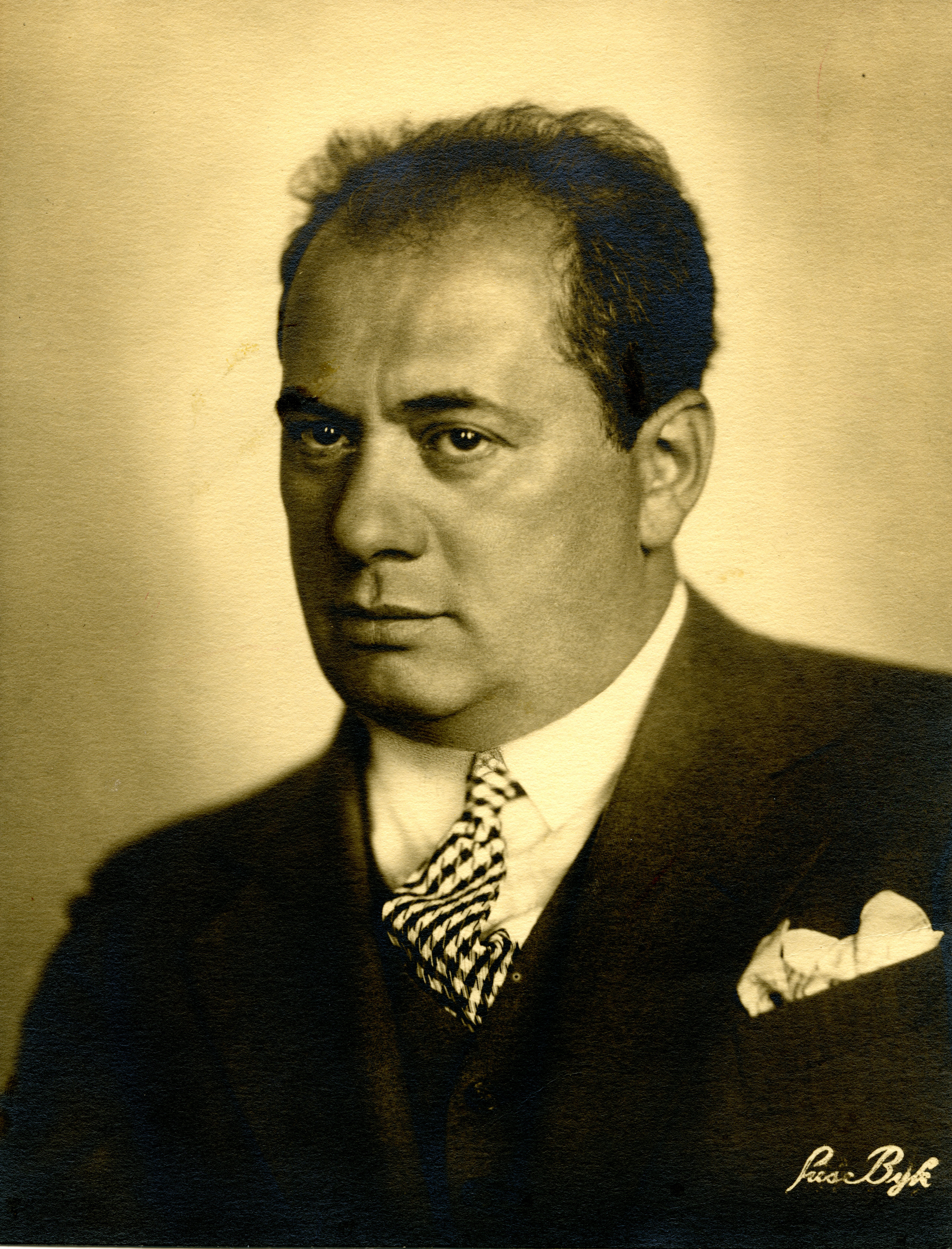
Ignatz Waghalter in 1925

Ignatz Waghalter (15 March 1881 – 7 April 1949) (Note: Although Encyclopaedia Judaica (2007) and the Oesterreichisches Musiklexikon give his birth year as 1882, the 1881 date is supported by Waghalter's autobiography and New York Times obituary, as well as by Deutschlandfunk Kultur.) was a Polish-German composer and conductor.

== Family and early life ==
Waghalter was born into a poor but musically accomplished Jewish family in Warsaw. His eldest brother, Henryk Waghalter (1869-1961), became a renowned cellist at the Warsaw Conservatory. Another older brother, Józef (1875/1880-1942), played second violin in the Warsaw Philharmonic Orchestra. Władysław (1885-1940), the youngest Waghalter brother, became a noted violinist. He also had a sister named Regina, who became the mother of notable poet Edmund Polak. At some point he married Toni, his wife, and had two daughters.

Ignatz made his way to Berlin at 17. There, he first studied with Philipp Scharwenka and then came to the attention of Joseph Joachim, the great violinist and close friend of Johannes Brahms. With the support of Joachim, Waghalter was admitted into the Prussian Academy of Arts in Berlin, where he studied composition and conducting under the direction of Friedrich Gernsheim.

== Career ==
Waghalter's String Quartet in D Major, Third Movement - Performed by the Polish String Quartet Berlin

In 1907, Waghalter secured a post as conductor at the Komische Oper in Berlin, assisting Arthur Nikisch, where his reputation grew rapidly. That was followed by a brief tenure at the Grillo-Theater, the Stadttheater Essen in Essen (1911–12). Waghalter was appointed as principal conductor at the new Deutsches Opernhaus in Berlin, where he conducted, on 7 November 1912, a performance of Fidelio. Three of Waghalter's own operas received their premiere at the Deutsches Opernhaus: Mandragola, based on a Renaissance comedy by Machiavelli, in January 1914.

=== Initial prominence ===
He championed the music of Giacomo Puccini, whose operas had previously met with little success in Germany. The first performance of Puccini's La Fanciulla del West in Germany was conducted by Waghalter in March 1913 at the Deutsches Opernhaus. Its positive reception was followed in December 1913 by the success of Puccini's Manon Lescaut, again under Waghalter's direction. The twin successes of La Fanciulla del West and Manon Lescaut secured for Puccini's operas a permanent place in the repertoires of Germany's opera houses. Waghalter also conducted the German debut performances of Tosca and La Bohème and also of Ralph Vaughan Williams' second symphony in 1923. Plans for a European tour were aborted by the outbreak of the First World War. Jugend, based on the tragic naturalist work by the German dramatist Max Halbe, in February 1917; and Sataniel, inspired by a Polish fantasy tale, in May 1923.

Traveling to the United States, he made his American debut as a conductor at a concert held in New York's Carnegie Hall on December 7, 1923. The New York Times gave a positive review, stating that Waghalter "showed himself a leader of force and fire, not a poseur." In 1924 he reportedly signed a contract with the English Grand Opera Company to conduct at Carnegie. The success of his debut and subsequent concerts as a guest conductor led to his appointment as the successor of Joseph Stransky as musical director of the New York State Symphony, a position he held during the 1925 season. Finding the purely commercial orientation of American musical life distasteful, Waghalter turned down an offer to remain at the State Symphony and returned to Germany.

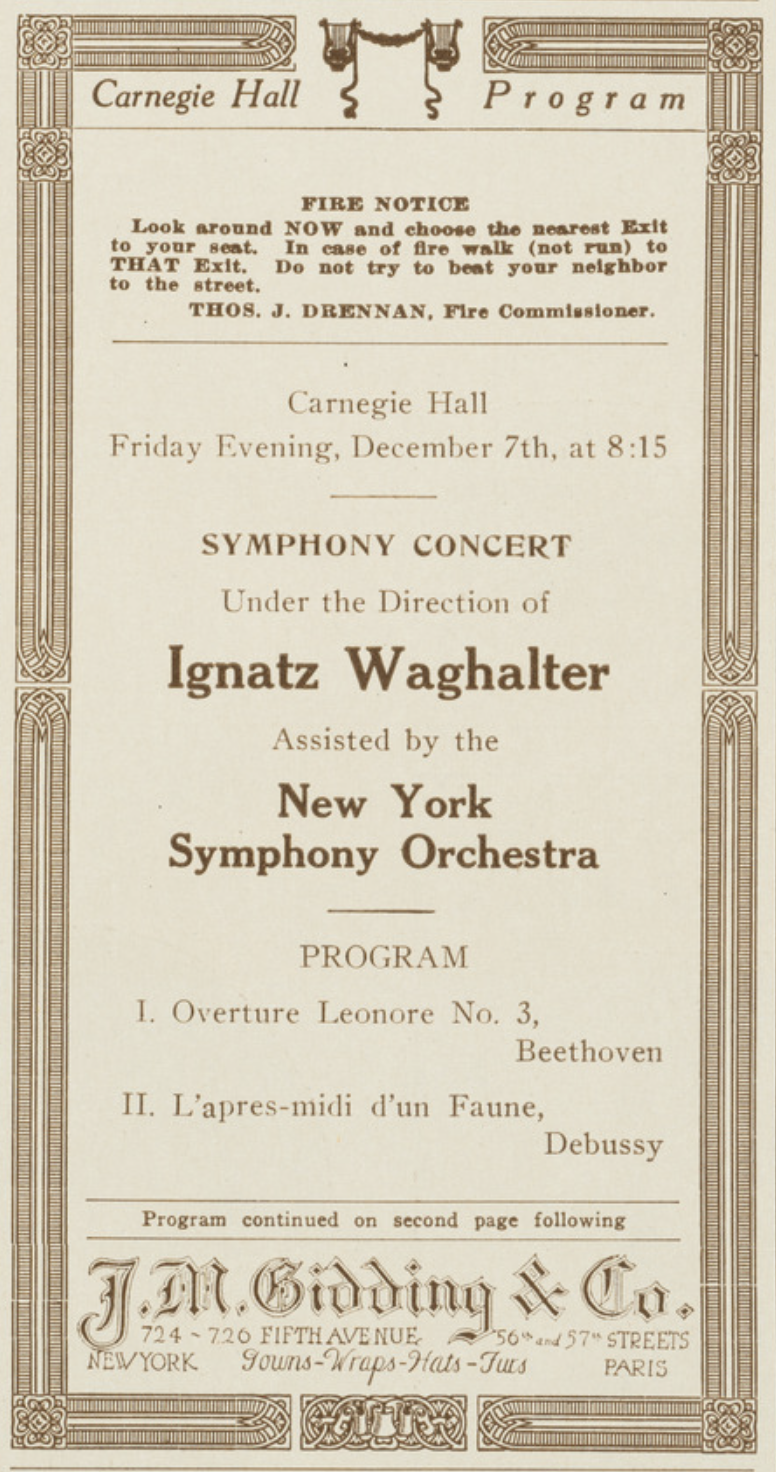
The Program of Waghalter's Carnegie Hall concert with the New York State Symphony Orchestra on December 7, 1923.

He was active as a guest conductor and also worked for German film productioncompany UFA GmbH, as its Generalmusikmeister . For UFA, Waghalter composed the original musical score for one of the most notable German films of the Weimar era, Hanns Walter Kornblum's Wunder der Schöpfung, which attempted to present in a popular cinematic form the greatest discoveries of modern astronomy. He composed several operettas, and was appointed musical director at the National Opera in Riga, Latvia, for the 1931–32 season.

=== Refuge from Nazi Germany ===
Shortly after his return to Berlin, the Nazis came to power. In 1934, he went into exile, moving first to Czechoslovakia and then to Austria, where he composed his last opera, Ahasuerus und Ester, of which a recording survives. Less than one year before the Anschluss, when Austria was annexed by Germany, he and his wife fled to the United States. In the notorious Lexicon Der Juden In Der Musik (The Lexicon of Jews in Music) published in Nazi Germany in 1940 for the purpose of identifying prominent Jewish musicians and eradicating their cultural influence, Ignatz and his daughter Beatrice, a singer, were specifically identified. The list of proscribed Jewish musicians included four other prominent musicians in the Waghalter family, including Ignatz's deceased father Abraham, brother Wladyslaw, and two nieces Jolantha and Ruth. Władysław died on October 20, 1940, hours after being summoned to Gestapo headquarters. Ruth was murdered in Auschwitz on February 11, 1943. Yolanda escaped to Peru and joined the National Symphony Orchestra in Lima as a violinist.

The brochure circulated by the Negro Symphony Orchestra to build support for the project.

Shortly after arriving in New York City in May 1937, Waghalter initiated a campaign to establish a classical orchestra of African-American musicians. He secured the interest and support of militant New York trade unions, the noted African-American musician Alfred Jack Thomas, and such prominent representatives of the Harlem Renaissance as James Weldon Johnson. (Note: Source incorrectly states Waghalter died in 1938) The orchestra performed publicly under Waghalter's direction in 1938. Waghalter composed an orchestral work for the Negro Symphony Orchestra, titled New World Suite, in 1938-39. However, it was not performed by the NSO because of the demise of the orchestra due to insufficient funding. The newspaper Baltimore Afro-American placed the establishment of the Negro Symphony Orchestra in the context of the Waghalter's own experience with racial persecution in Nazi Germany. In an interview with the newspaper in January 1939, Waghalter declared that "music, the strongest citadel of universal democracy, knows neither color, creed, nor nationality."

A notable event was the live radio performance of Ahasuerus und Ester on February 10, 1941, which was broadcast by New York City's historic classical music station, WQXR, Waghalter himself directed the performance from the piano. The role of Ester was sung by his daughter, Beatrice Waghalter (1913-2001), who, prior to fleeing Nazi Germany, had achieved renown as a singer performing on behalf of the Jüdischer Kulturbund. A partitur of Ahasuerus und Ester in Waghalter's handwriting was discovered in 2013, raising the possibility of its performance in the future. Waghalter's final work was an operetta, Ting-Ling, which was performed in the summer of 1948 at the Olgonquit Playhouse. The composer died in New York City on April 7, 1949, at the age of 68.

== Reception ==
=== Contemporary ===
Contemporary reviews of Waghalter's compositions repeatedly emphasized his melodic inventiveness, orchestral skill, and ability to communicate dramatic emotion. These qualities were particularly evident in the reception of his operas and orchestral works.

In his autobiography, Waghalter writes that his early String Quartet in D Major, Opus 3, was highly praised by Joachim. Another early work, Waghalter's Sonata for Violin and Pianoforte in F Minor, Opus 5, received the Mendelssohn-Preis in 1902, when the composer was 21. Of Manon Lescaut, the Signale für die musikalische Welt reported that "...the orchestra played with a verve, a passion, at the same time with a sensual beauty of tone, as if its salvation depended on it. One cannot help but hold the conductor Ignaz Waghalter responsible for this inspiration, in whom the Institute really seems to possess an extraordinary power."

In its review of Mandragola, the Signale wrote that "the crucial thing is that Waghalter really has genuine melodic and rhythmic ideas. And since he is not stingy with them, he seems to be able to rely on a large supply." The Berliner Tageblatt reviewed Jugend, noting "Waghalter has always written brilliantly for the orchestra" and praised the composer's "ability to express his feelings in a natural melodic flow without becoming banal or uninteresting." The review reported that the audience "repeatedly called Ignatz Waghalter, who conducted his work himself, onto the stage to rapturous applause, leaving no doubt that he was to be congratulated on a highly favorable reception."

=== Modern ===
Waghalter's early chamber music revealed an intense melodic imagination that was to remain a distinctive characteristic of his compositional work. In a review of a 2020 recording of the quartet, performed by the Polish String Quartet Berlin, Lutz Lesle wrote in the Neue Zeitschrift für Music that: "It is almost impossible to believe that the String Quartet in D Major, Opus 3 is the work of a twenty-year old. Here, a finely-honed natural talent surges through the youthful style and character landscape of the genre." His music in the film Wunder der Schöpfung was described by one critic as a "sensation." The December 2012 issue of Pizzicato Magazine awarded the Naxos release of the Violin Concerto a coveted Supersonic designation. In his review, editor-in-chief Remy Franck wrote: "What a discovery: The Violin Concerto of composer Ignatz Waghalter was, with its romantic characteristics, somewhat 'out of fashion' at the time of its composition in 1911 – but the wealth of ideas in this composition is fascinating. And that goes as well for the other works in this CD."

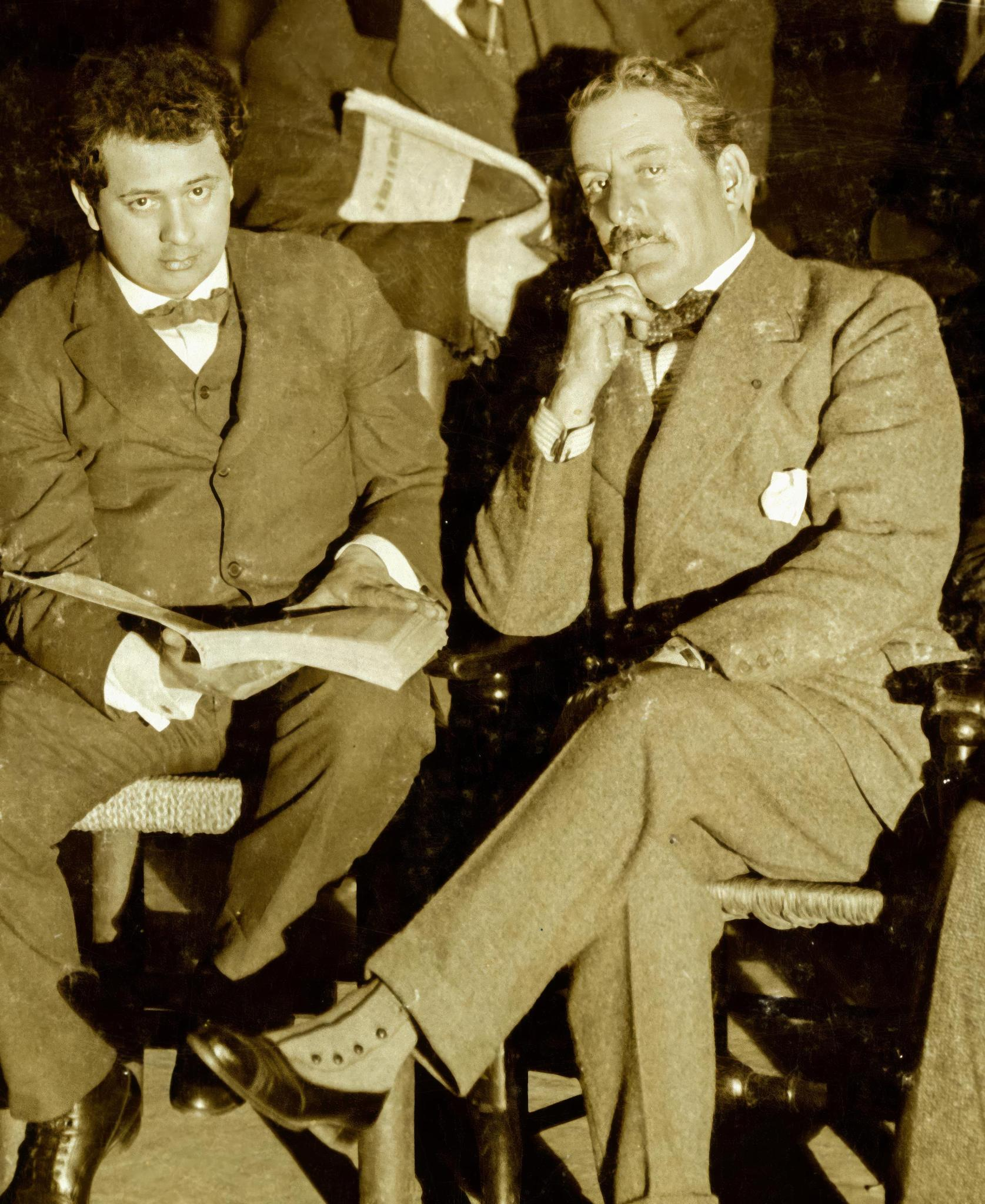
Giacomo Puccini and Waghalter in Berlin in 1913

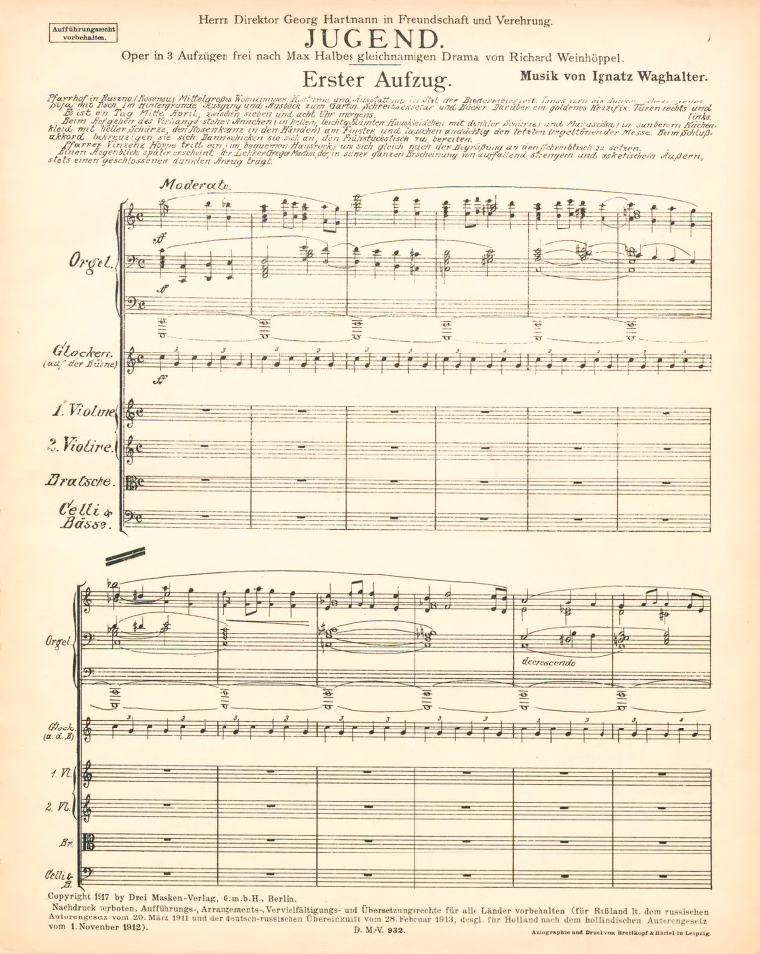
First page of the orchestral partitur of Waghalter's Jugend.

A 1925 recording of Waghalter conducting the orchestra of the Berlin State Opera in a performance of the overture to Mozart's opera, The Marriage of Figaro.

According to historian and musicologist David Goldfarb, Waghalter's "sense of universal democracy included women." Mildred Franklin Howard, a Black violinist, was appointed as the orchestra's concertmaster in what Goldfarb considered a testament to Waghalter's "egalitarianism." In the liner notes accompanying the CD of the Concerto for Violin, Michael Haas - director of Research at the Jewish Music institute's ‘International Centre of Suppressed Music’ at Royal Holloway, describes Waghalter as "one of the most unjustly forgotten musicians of pre-1933 Europe," whose remarkable work compels the listener to wonder "how was it possible that this music went missing for a century?"

Segment from the 1941 live New York City radio broadcast of Waghalter's "Ahasuerus und Ester." The soprano is the composer's daughter, Beatrice Waghalter. Beatrice Waghalter c. 1940

== Legacy ==
Even though he was one of many Central European musicians whose lives and careers were shattered by the Nazi catastrophe, his subsequent and protracted obscurity, when contrasted to the scale of his pre-1933 prominence, is striking. His fate may be explained, to a large extent, by the radical shift in musical aesthetics in the aftermath of World War II. Waghalter's inexhaustible melodic imagination and seriousness of his thematic ideas had led to his being described as the "German Puccini." He did not experiment with atonality and serialism, and his commitment to melodicism placed him well outside the precincts of what was then considered the musical avant-garde. However, more recent critical questioning of atonalism and a corresponding revival of interest in composers who worked in a melodic idiom have encouraged a reconsideration of Waghalter. The Deutsche Oper, the successor of the Deutsches Opernhaus, staged a concert performance of Waghalter's Jugend in 1989, and a new recording of his early chamber music was released in March 2006.

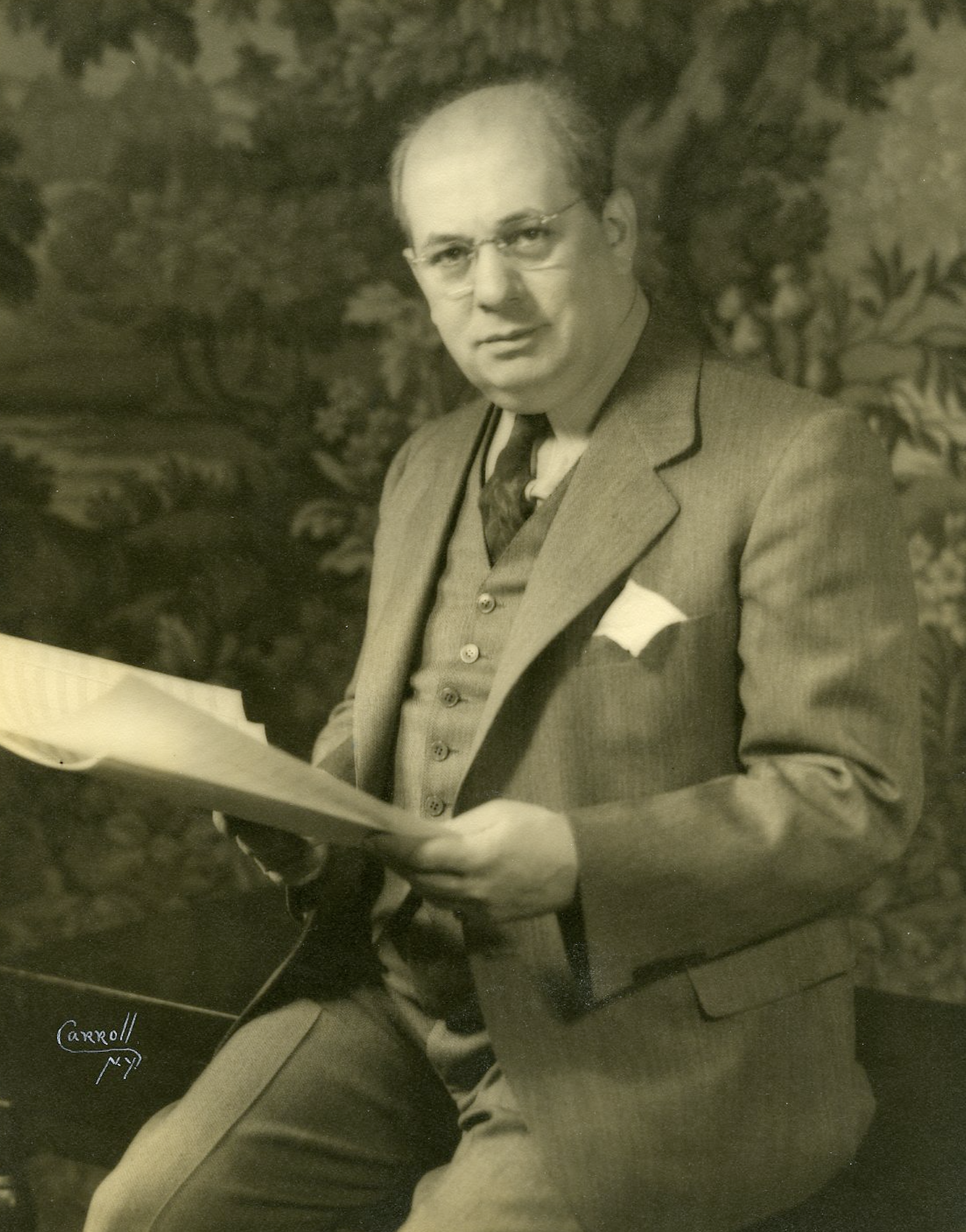
Ignatz Waghalter in New York, 1945

Waghalter, closed his autobiography Aus dem Ghetto in die Freiheit (From the Ghetto into Freedom), written in Czechoslovakia in 1936 after fleeing Nazi Germany, with a statement of his artistic ethos. "I want to serve my art and humanity, according to the words of Moses: 'You have been sent out to serve your brothers.'” His grandson David Waghalter Green believed he would have been "one of the great film composers" of Hollywood if he had arrived at the United States West Coast instead.

=== Renewed attention ===
Interest in Waghalter's compositions has been renewed in recent years through new recordings, performances, and the rediscovery of previously unpublished works.

In March 2011 Waghalter's Rhapsody for Violin and Orchestra and Concerto for Violin and Orchestra were recorded by the Royal Philharmonic Orchestra in London, with conductor Alexander Walker and soloist Irmina Trynkos. The CD was released, under the Naxos label, in October 2012.

The handwritten score of New World Suite was discovered by British conductor Alexander Walker among Waghalter's unpublished papers in 2013. A recording of the work, conducted by Walker, was released by Naxos in 2015. The New World Suite received its world premiere by the Poznań Philharmonic Orchestra in Poland in May 2019.

"Remembrance", composed by Waghalter in 1941 in New York, evokes the sadness of his final years as an exile compelled to flee Europe by the Nazis. Performed by [Giorgi Latso]

A performance of his Concerto for Violin by the Poznań Philharmonic Orchestra was broadcast in Germany by the Deutschlandradio Kultur in commemoration of the 135th anniversary of the composer's birth, in March 2016. On September 1, 2023, at an official commemorative meeting in Berlin marking the 84th anniversary of Nazi Germany's invasion of Poland, Waghalter's String Quartet was performed.

== Selected works ==
- String Quartet in D Major, Opus 3
- Sonata for Violin and Piano in F Minor, Opus 5
- Rhapsody for Violin and Orchestra, Opus 9
- Concerto for Violin and Orchestra, Opus 15
- New World Suite for Orchestra (1939)
- Operas: Der Teufelsweg, Mandragola, Jugend, Sataniel and Ahasverus und Ester
- Operettas: Der späte Gast, Wem gehört Helena, Bärbel, Lord Tommy, Der Weiberkrieg, and Ting-Ling
- Piano Works: Zwölf Skizzen für Klavier, Opus 17, Drei Klavierstuecke Opus 8, Trois Morceaux, Opus 13
- Works for piano and violin: Idyll, Opus 14a, Gestaendnis, Opus 14b
- Several Song Cycles
- I Saw Her (Reitiha)

Waghalter's Autobiography, Aus dem Ghetto in die Freiheit, was published in Czechoslovakia in 1936.

Preceded by Joseph Stransky	Musical Directors, New York Philharmonic; 1924–1925	Succeeded by Willem Mengelberg
