= Symphony No. 1 (Brian) =

Symphony composed by Havergal Brian

- The Gothic
- by Havergal Brian
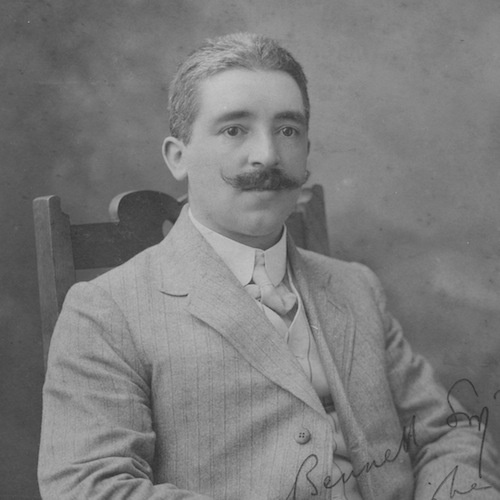
- Havergal Brian c. 1900
- Key: D minor/E major
- Text: Te Deum
- Composed: 1919–1927
- Dedication: Richard Strauss
- Published: 1932
- Publisher: Cranz & Co.
- Duration: 2 hours
- Movements: 6
- Scoring: Large orchestra, plus offstage brass players
- Vocal: 4 SATB choirs, children's choir, four soloists

Premiere
- Date: 24 June 1961
- Location: Central Hall Westminster, London
- Conductor: Bryan Fairfax
- Performers: Multiple Ensembles (see performances)

The Symphony No. 1 in D minor (The Gothic) is a symphony composed by Havergal Brian between 1919 and 1927. It is one of the longest symphonies ever composed. Along with choral symphonies such as Beethoven's Ninth Symphony or Mahler's Eighth Symphony, it is one of a few works attempting to use the musically gigantic to address the spiritual concerns of humanity. Beginning in D minor and closing in E major, the work is an example of progressive tonality.

== History ==
The genesis of the work stems from many sources, including a conversation Brian had with Henry Wood about writing a suite that would revive the older instruments that had fallen out of use in the modern symphony orchestra, such as the oboe d'amore or basset horn. This idea was repudiated by Brian's close friend Granville Bantock, but returned when Brian turned to writing symphonies after the end of the First World War.

The Gothic element refers to the vision of the Gothic age (from about 1150 to 1500) as representing a huge (almost unlimited) expansion in humanity's artistic and intellectual development, but particularly manifest in the architecture of the great European cathedrals. The scale of the choral finale, which took several years to write, appears to be an attempt to evoke the scale and detail of this architecture in sound; Brian had to paste blank pages of score together to be able to write the work on gigantic sheets with 54 staves to the page.

Brian also seems to have identified with the character of Faust, particularly in attempting to write such affirmative music in the post-war atmosphere when many composers had turned from pre-war giganticism, and the finale bears an apposite quote from Goethe's Faust Part Two Act V, which translates as, "The man who ever strives may earn redemption." Brian dedicated the work to Richard Strauss, who in a letter of acknowledgement described it as "grossartig" (magnificent).

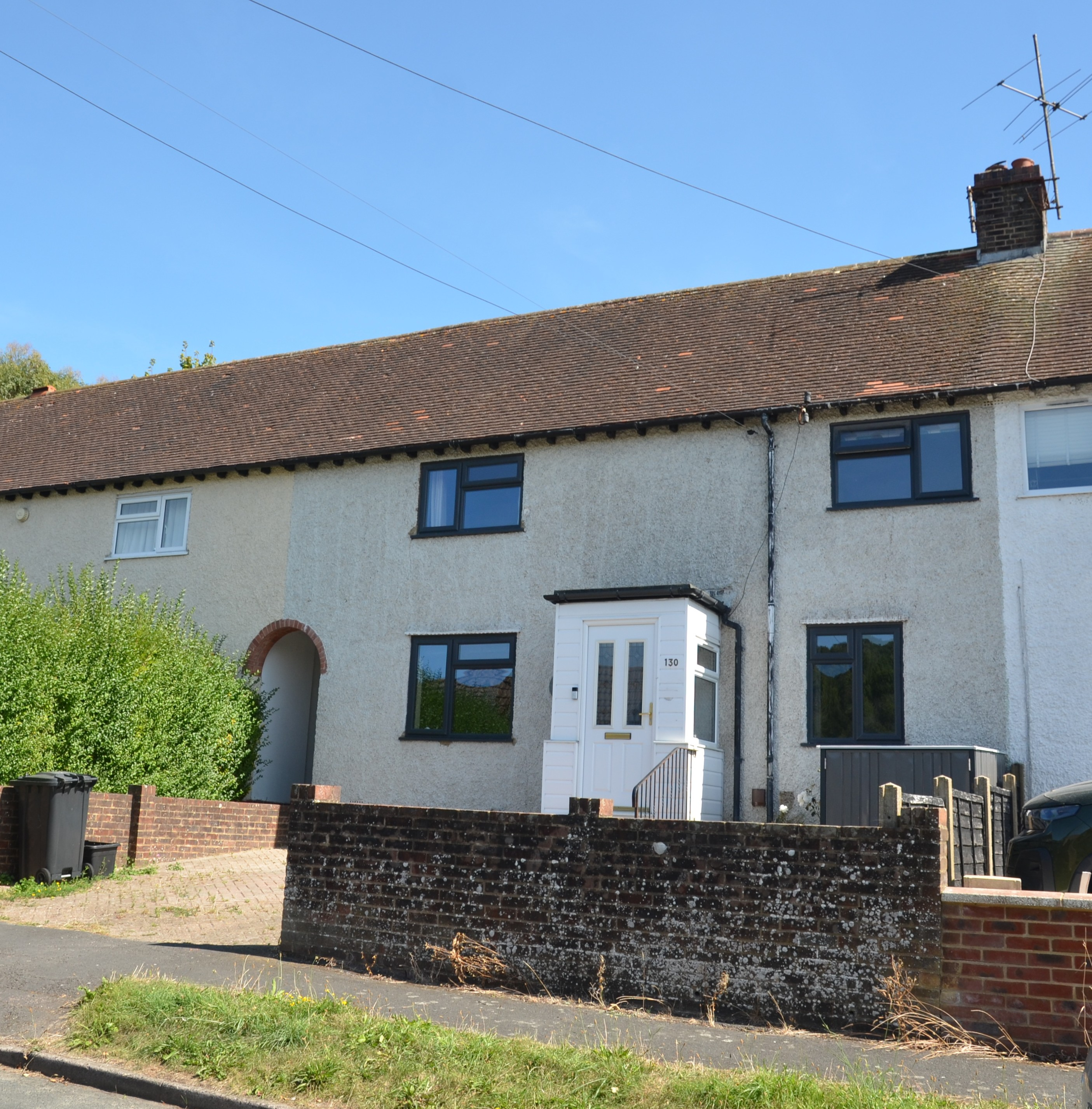
130 Hillside, Moulsecoomb, Brighton, Brian's home during the years the Gothic Symphony was completed.

The work (more specifically the first three orchestral movements) was submitted in 1928 as an entry for the 1928 International Columbia Graphophone Competition in memory of Schubert and won second prize in the 'English Zone' of that contest; in the final international judging in Vienna it was one of a number of works – others were by Czesław Marek, Franz Schmidt and Charles Haubiel – that lost out to the Sixth Symphony of Kurt Atterberg.

It was however published in 1932 by the Leipzig-based Cranz & Co. (in an edition beset with printing errors) as "Symphony No. 2" — the number it bore until Brian renumbered his early symphonies in 1967, eliminating the long-defunct A Fantastic Symphony of 1907 and inserting the previously-unnumbered Sinfonia Tragica of 1948 as the new No. 6. A photographically reduced study score of the Cranz edition was published by United Music Publishers in 1976, though with little effort to correct the copious errors, and still bearing the incorrect No. 2.

== Instrumentation ==
The orchestral forces for this symphony are commonly thought to be the largest employed in the symphonic repertoire. In practice, some small reductions can be made without discernible loss (e.g. cutting two of the orchestral trumpets and the doubling to 2nd contrabass trombone).

=== Part One ===
Woodwinds

2 piccolos (1 doubling 4th flute)
3 flutes (1 doubling alto flute)
2 oboes
oboe d'amore
cor anglais
bass oboe
E♭ clarinet
2 B♭ clarinets
basset horn
bass clarinet
3 bassoons
contrabassoon

Brass

6 horns
E♭ cornet
4 trumpets
bass trumpet
3 tenor trombones
2 tubas

Percussion

2 sets of timpani
glockenspiel
xylophone
bass drums
snare drum
tambourine
cymbals
tam-tam
triangle

Keyboards

organ
celesta

Strings

2 harps
16 violin Is
16 violin IIs
12 violas
10 cellos
8 double basses

=== Part Two ===
Woodwinds

2 piccolos (1 doubling 7th flute)
6 flutes (1 doubling alto flute)
6 oboes (1 doubling oboe d'amore, 1 doubling bass oboe)
2 cors anglais
2 E♭ clarinets (1 doubling 5th B♭ clarinet)
4 B♭ clarinets
2 basset horns
2 bass clarinets
contrabass clarinet
3 bassoons
2 contrabassoons

Brass

8 horns
2 E♭ cornets
4 trumpets
bass trumpet
3 tenor trombones
bass trombone
contrabass trombone
2 euphoniums
2 tubas

Percussion

2 sets of timpani
glockenspiel
xylophone
2 bass drums
2 (preferably 3) snare drums
long drum
2 tambourines
6 sets of cymbals
tam-tam
thunder machine
tubular bells
chimes
chains
2 triangles
bird scarer

Keyboards

organ
celesta

Offstage

8 horns
8 trumpets
8 tenor trombones
8 tubas
4 sets of timpani

Voices

soprano soloist
alto soloist
tenor soloist
baritone soloist
4 SATB choirs
1 children's choir

Strings

2 harps
20 violin Is
20 violin IIs
16 violas
14 cellos
12 double basses

The off-stage brass and timpani are organised into four "Brass Orchestras", each consisting of 2 trumpets, 2 horns, 2 tenor trombones, 2 tubas and 3 timpani (one player)

== Form ==
The symphony consists of six movements, organised into two parts with each part containing three movements, marked as follows:

Part One

1. Allegro assai – attacca:
2. Lento espressivo e solenne – attacca:
3. Vivace – attacca:

Part Two

4. Te Deum laudamus. Allegro moderato
5. Judex crederis esse venturus. Adagio solenne e religioso
6. Te ergo quaesumus. Moderato e molto sostenuto

=== Part One ===
Part one is exclusively orchestral; part two requires the full ensemble, with choral parts set to the words of the Latin religious hymn, the Te Deum. The three movements in Part One play for about forty minutes uninterrupted, and set the stage for the choir-dominated Part Two, which is over an hour in duration and contains a huge range of styles of music, daringly welded together in an attempt to solve the "finale problem" which Brian had set himself. It is written for an extremely large symphony orchestra, four additional brass orchestras, four vocal soloists, four adult choirs, and children's choir.

The work begins with a brilliant flourish given by the full orchestra (which in Part One number approximately one hundred players). The first movement appears to feature two extremely contrasted ideas in the style of sonata form, one a vigorous leaping figure in D minor, the other a suave melody first stated on solo violin in the remote key of D♭ major, though the working out of the music involves a process of ongoing development within the exposition, and avoids the expected re-capitulation by reversing the order of musical events, with the return of the first idea effectively starting the coda.

The second movement begins with a stately and solemn march, almost as for a funeral cortege, which builds to a grim and powerful conclusion. The third movement starts with an ostinato in the style of Bruckner that gives way to a recurring idea based on the opening leaping figure of the first movement, initially stated on horns. After various developments culminating in a bizarre polytonal passage with a virtuoso xylophone cadenza, the theme is transformed into a climactic march which eventually throws the movement into the home key of D minor, and subsides quietly with the original statement of the music for horns followed by a harp arpeggio and a final chord of D major.

=== Part Two ===
At this point, the choirs and soloists strike in unaccompanied with the opening stanza of the Te Deum, followed immediately by a fanfare for the enlarged orchestra for Part Two (which is supposed to be about 150-strong, besides the extra 40 or so players comprising the four extra brass orchestras). The eclecticism of Brian's music here borrows references as diverse as mediaeval fauxbourdon, Renaissance multiple polyphony on the scale of Tallis's Spem in alium all the way through to twentieth century tone clusters, polytonality and the use of percussion and brass in a Varèse-like outburst of extreme dissonance. The text is treated episodically with sections for full orchestra and choir frequently alternating with unaccompanied passages for the choir alone.

The fourth movement moves away from tonalities centered around D and establishes E as a new tonal centre, which is strenuously challenged in the following movements. The start of the fifth movement involves only the choirs in a fearsomely chromatic un-accompanied polyphonic passage, after which the soprano soloist gently sings a wordless vocalise "like an indefinite intonation". A fanfare for eight trumpets and a lengthy orchestral passage then introduces each of the four separate brass orchestras paired with one of the four corresponding choirs. A second orchestral development then culminates in a huge climax for the full forces. Thereafter the sixth and final movement continues with even more contrasted and episodic treatment of the text as the music seems to struggle to reach a conclusion. At the final words "non confundar in aeternum" the music violently flares up with two dissonant outbursts answered by the choirs, followed by a despairing orchestral coda, but the work is finally clinched with a murmuring from the choir, which finally confirms the tonality of E major where the words "non confundar in aeternum" are repeated.

== Duration ==
At around 110 minutes it is one of the longest symphonies ever composed. Others include Mahler's Symphony No. 3 at 90 to 105 minutes (the only symphony of this length to be regularly performed and recorded), Derek Bourgeois's Symphony No 42: Life, the Universe, and Everything at 155 minutes, Sorabji's Organ Symphony No. 2 at nine hours, and Dimitrie Cuclin's unperformed Symphony No. 12 at about six hours.

== Performances ==
Attempts to perform the symphony have frequently met with failure, beginning with the efforts of Hamilton Harty and Eugene Goossens in the depression-affected 1930s and enduring to the current day, usually owing to the extreme logistics of the work. The work was eventually premiered in 1961, and has been followed by a mere handful of performances, often by partly or wholly amateur forces; the 1978 performance for example was an ad hoc amateur orchestra specially assembled for the occasion, in Brian's home county of Staffordshire. The first professional performance in 1966 was enthusiastically received by the audience in the Royal Albert Hall when the composer himself, aged 90, was in attendance to take a bow at the work's conclusion; this performance was also broadcast live by the BBC.

The alto Shirley Minty sang in the 1966 and 1980 performances, and appears to be the only person who has played a prominent role in more than one performance of the work.

| Date | Venue | Ensembles | Soloists | Conductor | Notes |
|---|---|---|---|---|---|
| 24 June 1961 | Central Hall Westminster, London | Polyphonia Symphony Orchestra, Royal Military School of Music, London Philharmonic Choir, Kingsway Choral Society, London Orpheus Choir, Hendon Grammar School Choir | Noelle Barker (soprano), Jean Evans (alto), Kenneth Bowen (tenor), John Shirley-Quirk (baritone) | Bryan Fairfax | First performance of the symphony. |
| 30 October 1966 | Royal Albert Hall, London | BBC Symphony Orchestra, BBC Choral Society, City of London Choir, Hampstead Choral Society, Emanuel School Choir, Orpington Junior Singers | Honor Sheppard (soprano), Shirley Minty (alto), Ronald Dowd (tenor), Roger Stalman (bass) | Adrian Boult | First professional performance of the symphony. |
| 10 October 1976 | Royal Albert Hall, London | New Philharmonia Orchestra | None (only orchestral movements were performed) | Charles Groves | Only Part One (movements I, II, and III) of the symphony was performed. |
| 21 May 1978 | Victoria Hall, Hanley | The Stoke Gothic Symphony Orchestra, Leicester Philharmonic Society, Keele Chamber Choir, Margaret Wharam Choir, Nantwich and District Choral Society, Oriana Choir, Potteries Choral Society, Stone Choral Society, Ashborne Parish Church Boys' Choir, Goudhurst Girls School Choir, Nantwich Parish Church Boys' Choir, Parish Church of St. Peter Choir | Margaret Tapley (soprano), Jean Reavley (alto), Eric Baskeyfield (tenor), Phillip Ravenscroft (bass) | Trevor Stokes | The orchestra was assembled ad hoc and the performance took place in Brian's home country. |
| 25 May 1980 | Royal Albert Hall, London | London Symphony Orchestra, London Symphony Chorus, London Philharmonic Choir, BBC Singers, BBC Club Choir, Hampstead Choral Society, Bach Choir, English Chamber Choir | Jane Manning (soprano), Shirley Minty (alto), John Mitchinson (tenor), David Thomas (bass) | Ole Schmidt | First performance of corrected edition. |
| 22 December 2010 | QPAC Concert Hall | The Gothic Symphony Orchestra, The Gothic Symphony Chorus, The Gothic Symphony Children's Chorus; Queensland Festival Chorus | Melissa Gill (soprano), Kathleen Lamont (alto), Luke Venables (tenor), Dimitri Kopanakis (bass) | John Curro | First performance of the symphony in Australia, and first performance outside England. |
| 17 July 2011 | Royal Albert Hall, London | BBC Concert Orchestra, BBC National Orchestra of Wales, City of Birmingham Symphony Orchestra Youth Chorus, Eltham College Boys' Choir, Southend Boys' and Girls' Choirs, The Bach Choir, BBC National Chorus of Wales, Brighton Festival Chorus, Côr Caerdydd, Huddersfield Choral Society, London Symphony Chorus | Susan Gritton (soprano), Christine Rice (mezzo-soprano), Peter Auty (tenor), Alastair Miles (bass) | Martyn Brabbins | The symphony was performed as part of the programme for the 2011 season of the Proms. |

== Recordings ==
| Conductor | Main Orchestra | Recording Date | Formats | Labels |
|---|---|---|---|---|
| Sir Adrian Boult | BBC Symphony Orchestra | 1966, released 2009 in Testament | LP / CD / Digital | Aries Records (bootleg recording) / Testament Records |
| Sir Charles Groves | New Philharmonia Orchestra | 1976, released 2020 | CD / Digital | Heritage Records |
| Ole Schmidt | London Symphony Orchestra | 1980, released 2026 | CD / Digital | Heritage Records |
| Ondrej Lenárd | CSR Symphony Orchestra Bratislava and Slovak Philharmonic Orchestra | 1989, released 1991, rereleased 2004 | CD / Digital | Marco Polo (1991) / Naxos Records (2004) |
| John Curro | The Gothic Symphony Orchestra | Recorded and released in 2010 | DVD | 4MBS |
| Martyn Brabbins | BBC Concert Orchestra and BBC National Orchestra of Wales | Recorded and released in 2011 | CD / Digital | Hyperion Records |
