= Malcolm MacDonald (music critic) =

British music critic (1948-2014)

Malcolm MacDonald (26 February 1948 – 27 May 2014), also known by the alias Calum MacDonald, was a British author, mainly about music.

== Biography ==
MacDonald was born in Nairn, Scotland and educated at the Royal High School, Edinburgh, and Downing College, Cambridge. He lived in England from 1971 until his death, first in London and from 1992 in Gloucestershire. He died at Leckhampton Hospice.

He wrote several books, notably volumes on Brahms, Schoenberg, John Foulds, Edgard Varèse, the Scottish composer-pianist Ronald Stevenson and a three-volume study of the 32 symphonies of Havergal Brian. Other books include a tourist guidebook to the city of Edinburgh and a multi-volume edition of the musical journalism of Havergal Brian. He contributed chapters to symposia on Brahms, Alan Bush, Erik Bergman, Shostakovich, Bernard Stevens, Ronald Stevenson, Varèse, an essay on Czesław Marek to a symposium on Swiss Composers, and another on Scottish composers to a symposium on musical nationalism in Great Britain and Finland. He also compiled catalogues of the works of John Foulds, Shostakovich, Luigi Dallapiccola and Antal Doráti and contributed articles to many musical encyclopaedias such as the New Grove.

He was editor of the modern-music journal Tempo, which he joined in 1972 as assistant to the then editor David Drew, until December 2013, and was a copious contributor to other English-language music-journals and magazines. For these and other journalistic purposes he used the nom-de-plume "Calum MacDonald" because at the outset of his writing career, which began with record reviewing for the journal Records & Recording, confusion arose between him and the composer Malcolm MacDonald, who was a long-established record reviewer for The Gramophone. As Calum MacDonald he also reviewed regularly for BBC Music Magazine and International Record Review.

In 1996 he edited for performance, and orchestrated the final portions of, the ballet Soirées de Barcelone by Roberto Gerhard, which was broadcast that year, performed by the BBC Philharmonic Orchestra, in a concert to mark the fiftieth anniversary of the BBC Third Programme. MacDonald was a prime mover in the revival of interest in the music of John Foulds, publishing his book on Foulds in 1975 and working with Lewis Foreman on the four volumes of his light music recorded by Dutton Epoch between 2010 and 2013. He also composed a number of works, mainly piano pieces and songs.

== Writings (selected list) ==
=== Books ===
- MacDonald, Malcolm (1972). Havergal Brian – perspective on the music. London: Triad Press. (limited edition)
- MacDonald, Malcolm (1974). The Symphonies of Havergal Brian: Volume One, Symphonies 1 to 12. London: Kahn & Averill. ISBN 0-900707-28-3.
- MacDonald, Malcolm (1975). John Foulds : his life in music : with a detailed catalogue of his works, a discography, a bibliographical note, and with music examples and illustrations. Rickmansworth: Triad Press. ISBN 0-902070-15-0.
- MacDonald, Malcolm (1977). Dmitri Shostakovich, A Complete Catalogue. London: Boosey and Hawkes. OCLC 4210867.
- MacDonald, Malcolm (1978). Luigi Dallapiccola, A Complete Catalogue. London: Boosey and Hawkes. OCLC 8283492.
- MacDonald, Malcolm (1983). The Symphonies of Havergal Brian: Volume Three, Symphonies 30 to 32, Survey and Summing-Up. London: Kahn & Averill. ISBN 0-900707-64-X.
- MacDonald, Calum (1983). Antal Doráti. A Catalogue of his Works. London: Boosey and Hawkes. No ISBN. 'Reprinted from Tempo 143 '
- Brian, Havergal (1986). Macdonald, Malcolm (ed.). Havergal Brian on Music. Volume 1: British Music. London: Toccata Press. ISBN 0-907689-19-1.
- MacDonald, Malcolm (1987) [1976]. Schoenberg (The Master Musicians Series). London: Dent. ISBN 0-460-03143-0.
- MacDonald, Malcolm (1989). John Foulds and his music : an introduction; with a catalog of the composer's works and a brief miscellany of his writings. White Plains, New York: Pro/Am Music Resources. ISBN 0-912483-02-4.
- MacDonald, Malcolm (1989). Ronald Stevenson: A Musical Biography. Edinburgh: National Library of Scotland. ISBN 0-902220-97-7.
- MacDonald, Malcolm (1990). Brahms (The Master Musicians Series). New York: Schirmer Books. ISBN 0-02-871393-1.
- MacDonald, Malcolm (1991) [1978]. The Symphonies of Havergal Brian: Volume Two, Symphonies 13 to 29. London: Kahn & Averill. ISBN 0-900707-43-7.
- MacDonald, Malcolm (2003). Varèse: Astronomer in Sound. London: Kahn & Averill. ISBN 1-871082-79-X.
- MacDonald, Malcolm (2008). Schoenberg. New York: Oxford University Press Inc. ISBN 978-0-19-517201-0. Revised edition of the 1976 Master Musicians volume.
- Brian, Havergal (2009). Macdonald, Malcolm (ed.). Havergal Brian on Music. Volume 2: European an American Music in his Time. London: Toccata Press. ISBN 978-0-907689-48-5.

=== Articles in symposia ===
- 'David Blake'; 'Postlude – a note on Christopher Shaw' in Lewis Foreman (ed), British Music Now: A Guide to the Work of Younger Composers (London,1975)
- 'Three Works by Erik Bergman' in J. Parsons (ed), Erik Bergman, A Seventieth Birthday Tribute (Helsinki, 1981)
- 'Words and Music in Late Shostakovich' in C. Norris (ed), Shostakovich: the Man and his Music (London, 1982)
- 'Aspects of Scottish Musical Nationalism in the 20th Century, with special reference to the Music of F.G. Scott, Ronald Center and Ronald Stevenson' in T. Mäkelä (ed), Music and Nationalism in 20th-century Great Britain and Finland (Hamburg, 1997)
- '"Dear Crusoe ... Always your Freitag": the Brian letters at McMaster University'; 'Havergal Brian's Letter to Herbert Thompson: some implications'; ' The Gothic: music and meaning'; 'Brian as Faust'; 'Psalm 23 – early Brian or late?'; 'Let the Roar of the Tigers be heard in the Land', all in J. Schaarwächter (ed), HB: Aspects of Havergal Brian (Aldershot, 1997)
- 'A Plaited Music: Ronald Stevenson at 70' in 'Meeting Ronald Stevenson', symposium in Chapman 89–90 ed. Joy Hendry (Edinburgh, 1998) ISBN 0-906772-85-0
- 'Czesław Marek and his Sinfonia' in Walton & Baldassare (eds), Musik im exil: Die Schweiz und das Ausland 1918–1945 (Berne, 2005)
- 'The Orchestral Music' in Colin Scott-Sutherland (ed), Ronald Stevenson: The Man and his Music, A Symposium (London, Toccata Press, 2005) ISBN 0-907689-40-X
- ' "I took a simple little theme and developed it": Shostakovich's string concertos and sonatas' in Pauline Fairclough and David Fanning (eds), The Cambridge Companion to Shostakovich (Cambridge, Cambridge University Press, 2008) ISBN 978-0-521-84220-4

=== Articles ===
- Many articles in the Newsletter of The Havergal Brian Society (see Articles in Symposia for those republished in 1997)
- 'Havergal Brian' (The Listener, 15 July 1971)
- 'Sense and Sound: Gerhard's Fourth Symphony' (Tempo No.100, 1972)
- 'Ronald Stevenson' (Musical Events, 1972)
- 'Visionary and Craftsman: Scriabin and Enescu' (The Listener, 8 September 1983)
- 'Visionary Ecstasy: Szymanowski's Third Symphony' (The Listener, 15 September 1983)
- 'Unreconciled Spirit: Franz Liszt 100 Years On' (The Listener, 24 July 1986)
- 'Sombre Tragedy: Karl Amadeus Hartmann's Symphonies' (The Listener, 4 September 1986)
- 'Spinner's Violin Sonata – Why Op.1?' (Tempo No.161/162, 1987)
- 'Key Changes: Henze's Third Period?' (The Listener, 1 September 1988)
- 'John Foulds (1880–1939). The Cello Sonata and its Context' (British Music Vol.20, 1998)
- 'Statements and Connotations: Copland the Symphonist' (Tempo No.213, 2000)
- 'Thoughts on Siegfried Wagner's Music' (International Record Review Volume 8 issue 10, July/August 2008)
- 'Où l'on retrouve les ailes ...' (Tempo Vol. 64 No. 252, April 2010)

== Sources ==
Mainly from the flyleaves of his books, and an autobiographical article, 'Too Many Records' in International Record Review (June 2002 edition)
