= Havergal Brian =

English composer (1876–1972)

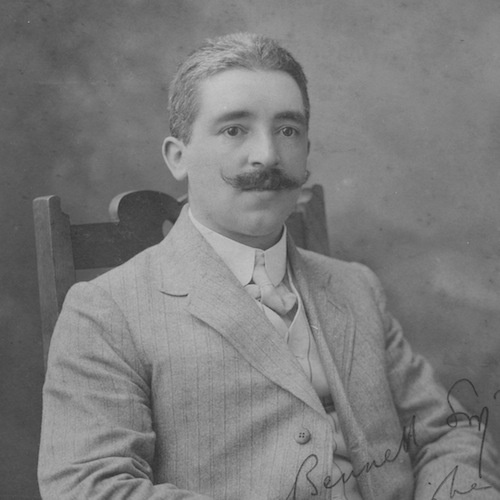
- Havergal Brian, c. 1900
- Born: William Havergal Brian; 29 January 1876; Dresden, Staffordshire, England
- Died: 28 November 1972 (aged 96); Shoreham-by-Sea, Sussex, England
- Notable work: Symphony No. 1, The Gothic; The Tigers

William Havergal Brian (29 January 1876 – 28 November 1972) was an English composer, librettist, critic, and church organist.

He is best known for having composed 32 symphonies – an unusually high number amongst his contemporaries – 25 of them after the age of 70. His best-known work is his Symphony No. 1, The Gothic, which calls for some of the largest orchestral forces demanded by a conventionally structured concert work.

He also composed five operas and a number of other orchestral works, as well as songs, choral music and a small amount of chamber music. Brian enjoyed a period of popularity earlier in his career and rediscovery in the 1950s, but public performances of his music have remained rare and he has been described as a cult composer. He continued to be extremely productive late into his career, composing large works even into his nineties, most of which remained unperformed during his lifetime.

== Life ==
=== Early life ===
William Havergal Brian was born on 29 January 1876 in Dresden, in the Potteries district of Staffordshire, near the Stoke-on-Trent suburb of Longton. He was one of a very small number of composers to originate from the English working class. Brian's middle name Havergal, by which he went beginning at a young age, was for Frances Ridley Havergal of the prominent Havergal hymn-writing family.

Brian's earliest musical education appears to have been as a choirboy; he sang in the choir at St James' church in Longton. In 1887 he and other choristers from his home town participated in a concert in Lichfield Cathedral marking the Jubilee of Queen Victoria. This experience gave the boy an interest in large-scale musical effects. At the age of 12, after leaving the elementary school attached to the church, he started work; he tried a variety of trades. In his spare time, he continued to study music including the organ for which he showed talent at a young age; as a composer he was virtually self-taught. From 1896 he was organist of All Saints', a Gothic Revival church in Odd Rode, just across the county border in Cheshire. The post involved playing at Sunday services; his main job at this time was with a timber company.

Around the time he started at All Saints', he was influenced by hearing King Olaf, a composition for soloists, choir and orchestra by Edward Elgar. Now one of the composer's lesser-known works, King Olaf was commissioned for the North Staffordshire Music Festival of 1896, where it was well received. Brian sent a sample composition to Elgar who gave him encouragement. Brian became a fervent enthusiast of the new music being produced by Richard Strauss and the British composers of the day. Through attending music festivals he began a lifelong friendship with composer Granville Bantock (1868–1946).

In 1898, Brian married Isabel Priestley, by whom he had five children. One of his sons was named Sterndale after the English composer Sir William Sterndale Bennett.

=== Full-time composer ===
In 1907 Brian was offered a yearly income of £500 (then a respectable lower-middle-class salary) by a local wealthy businessman, Herbert Minton Robinson, to enable him to devote all his time to composition. It seems Robinson expected Brian soon to become successful and financially independent on the strength of his compositions, and initially Brian indeed found success: his first English Suite attracted the attention of Henry J. Wood, who performed it at the London Proms in 1907. The work proved popular and Brian obtained a publisher and performances for his next few orchestral works, although this initial success was not maintained. For a while Brian worked on a number of ambitious large-scale choral and orchestral works, but felt no urgency to finish them, and began to indulge in pleasures such as expensive foods and a trip to Italy.

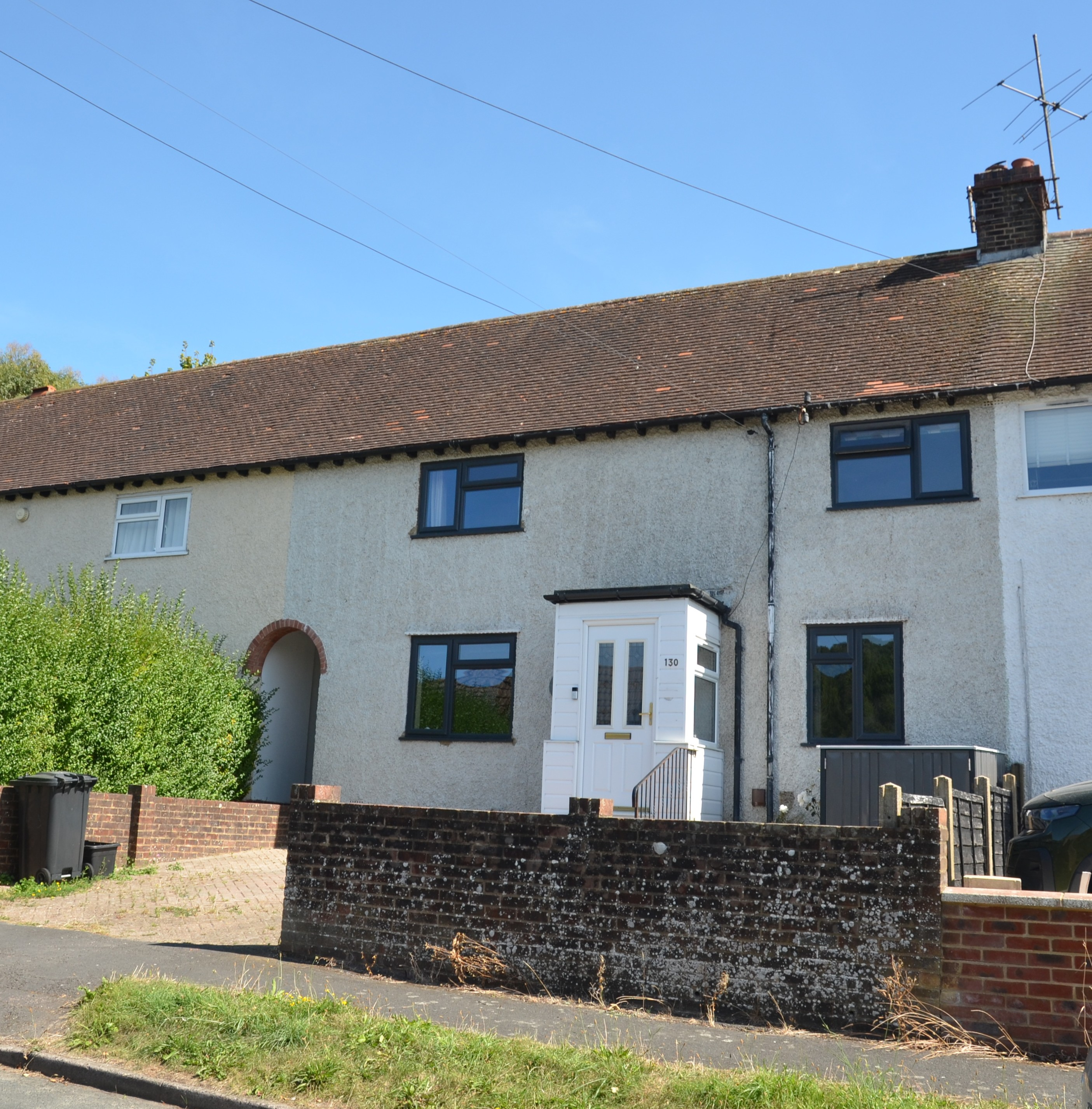
130 Hillside, Moulsecoomb, Brighton was Brian's home from 1922 to 1927.

Arguments over the money and an affair with a young servant, Hilda Mary Hayward (1894-1980), led to the collapse of his first marriage in 1913. Brian fled to London and, although Robinson (who disapproved of the incident) continued to provide him with money until his own death, most of the allowance went to Brian's estranged wife after 1913. The affair with Hilda turned into a lifelong relationship: Brian and she began living together as man and wife, and after Isabel's death in 1933 they were married, by which point Hilda had already borne him another five children. No longer able to rely on Robinson's support, in London Brian began composing copiously while living in poverty. On the outbreak of World War I he volunteered for the Honourable Artillery Company but saw no service before he was invalided out with a hand injury. He subsequently worked at the Audit Office of the Canadian Expeditionary Force until December 1915. The family then moved to Erdington, near Birmingham, Warwickshire, until May 1919 and then spent several years in various locations in Sussex. His brief war service gave him the material for his first opera The Tigers. In the 1920s he turned to composing symphonies, though he had written more than ten before one of them was first performed in the early 1950s. Brian eventually obtained work of a musical kind, copying and arranging, and writing for the journal The British Bandsman. In 1927, he became assistant editor of the journal Musical Opinion and moved back to London.

In 1940 he retired, living first in London, and then in Shoreham-by-Sea, Sussex. Freed from the requirement to work to make a living, he was able to devote all of his time to composition, and the bulk of his compositional output belongs to the last three decades of his life, including four of the five operas (composed between 1951 and 1957) and twenty-seven of the thirty-two symphonies (composed from 1948 onwards). Through most of the 1960s, Brian composed two or three symphonies each year.

This late flurry of activity coincided with something of a rediscovery, in part due to the efforts of Robert Simpson, himself a significant composer and BBC Music Producer, who asked Sir Adrian Boult to programme the Eighth Symphony in 1954. A number of Brian works received their public premieres during this time, including the Gothic Symphony. Written decades earlier between 1919 and 1927, it was premiered in a partly amateur performance in 1961 at Westminster Central Hall, conducted by Bryan Fairfax. A fully professional performance followed in 1966 at the Royal Albert Hall, conducted by Boult. The latter performance was broadcast live, encouraging considerable interest, and by his death six years later several of his works had been performed, along with the first commercial recordings of Brian's music. For a few years after Brian's death there was a revival of interest in Brian with a number of further recordings and performances; two biographies and a three-volume study of his symphonies appeared.

After having heard the Sinfonia Tragica (No. 6), the conductor Leopold Stokowski expressed his interest in conducting Brian's music. The result was the world premiere in 1973 of the 28th Symphony, in a BBC broadcast produced by Robert Simpson in Maida Vale Studio 1, and played by the New Philharmonia Orchestra. Anthony Payne in his Daily Telegraph review wrote: "It was fascinating to contemplate the uniqueness of the event – a 91-year-old conductor learning a new work by a 91-year-old composer."

== Music ==
Stylistically, Brian's music could broadly be described as being in a late romantic idiom, exhibiting the influence of Gustav Mahler in his ambitious orchestration and progressive tonality. A Germanophile – the text of the Psalms in his fourth symphony is sung in German – Brian's main musical influences are primarily Germanic composers like Wagner, Bruckner, Strauss, Mahler and Bach, as well as Elgar. Brian's music is fundamentally tonal rather than atonal and shows little or no influence of dodecaphony; however, it is often punctuated with violent and occasionally dissonant passages.

Brian's music has several recognisable hallmarks: the liking of extreme dotted rhythms, deep brass notes, and various uncharacteristic harp, piano and percussion timbres, and other unusual orchestral sounds and textures. Also typical are moments of stillness, such as the slow harp arpeggio that is heard near the beginning and ending of the Eighth Symphony. Arguably, his music's most notable characteristic however is its restlessness: rarely does one mood persist for long before it is contrasted, often abruptly, with another. Even in Brian's slow movements, lyrical meditation does not often structure the music for long before restless thoughts intrude. Although the fragmentary nature of his music militates against classical thematic unity, he often employs structural blocks of sound, where similar rhythms and thematic material allude to previous passages (as opposed to classical statement and recapitulation). However fragmentary Brian's music is, he maintains symphonic cohesion by long-term tonal processes (similar to Carl Nielsen's "progressive tonality"), where the music is aiming towards a key, rather than being in a home key and returning to it.

Like Bach and Bruckner, Brian was an organist, and the organ repertoire influenced his musical habits (and the organ appears in several of his symphonies). Other sources of influence are late Victorian street music, and particularly brass and military bands: although he composed little dedicated music for brass band, brass instruments are often prominent in Brian's orchestral music, as are marches.

Although he wrote music in a range of forms, Brian is best known for his 32 symphonies. His first canonical symphony – an earlier Fantastic Symphony was withdrawn – is the colossal Gothic Symphony, a performance of which last almost two hours and requires enormous orchestral and choral forces. It was completed in 1927. Although the Gothic is by far Brian's best-known work, and perhaps the work by which he has come to be defined, it is not representative of his symphonies as a whole. Few of Brian's symphonies call for larger forces than a typical 20th-century symphony orchestra – although No. 4 (Das Siegeslied) calls for a large choir and soprano soloist – and a typical Brian symphony lasts approximately 20 minutes in performance. Brian usually alludes to the classical four-movement structure of the symphony, even in single-movement works. His sixth symphony was composed at the age of 72, and the majority of Brian's symphonies were composed in rapid succession in the last two decades of his life, in his 80s and even into his 90s. Most were unperformed during Brian's own life, although all 32 have since been recorded.

In addition to symphonies, Brian also composed several large operas in the 1950s. In 1997, Brian's 1951 opera in eight scenes The Cenci, based on the 1819 play by Percy Bysshe Shelley, was premiered in a concert performance by the Millennium Sinfonia, conducted by James Kelleher, at the Queen Elizabeth Hall, London.

== Reception and legacy ==
Brian's musical influence was limited by the fact that so little of his music was performed or recorded until after his death, by which time his stylistic idiom could be considered anachronistic. Nonetheless, he was held in high regard by composers such as Robert Simpson and some of his contemporaries, such as Granville Bantock. His music has generally been championed by a small number of enthusiasts rather than enjoying a more general popularity, and continues to divide opinion. To Mark Morris, writing in his Guide to Twentieth Century Composers, in the Gothic Symphony Brian achieved "one of the world's artistic masterpieces, in vision, grandeur, and in the combination of complexity and luminosity worthy to stand alongside the great cathedrals of the age that inspired it... [it] is arguably, more than any other late-Romantic work, the climax of the Romantic age.". Writing in The Spectator in 2016, Damian Thompson claimed that if Brian's 30th symphony were premiered today as the work of a 25-year-old composer, it "might even be hailed as the triumphant reinvention of tonality".

Others have been more critical, however. Reviewing the 2011 performance of the Gothic Symphony at the BBC Proms David Nice of The Arts Desk described the work as a "terrible, inchoate mess" and "Big, long, and very short on great ideas"; writing in The Guardian, Andrew Clements described it as featuring "moments of striking originality, particularly the sparer, more spectral ideas, but much more is either entirely unmemorable or simply grotesquely odd, and often hopelessly over-scored. Ideas come and go; for a work that lasts nearly two hours, the music is surprisingly short-winded."

In 2022 Brian's Legend for violin and piano was featured in the BBC Proms.

== Works ==
These lists follow the Havergal Brian Society's Extant Works (ordered by type):

=== Operas ===
- The Tigers (1917–29)
- Turandot, Prinzessin von China (1951)
- The Cenci (1951–52)
- Faust (1955–56)
- Agamemnon (1957)

=== Symphonies ===
- Symphony No. 1 in D minor (The Gothic) (1919–27), for SATB soli, children's choir, two double choirs & orchestra
- Symphony No. 2 in E minor (1930–31)
- Symphony No. 3 in C♯ minor (1931–32)
- Symphony No. 4, "Das Siegeslied" (1932–33), for soprano, double choir & orchestra
- Symphony No. 5, "Wine of Summer" (1937), for baritone & orchestra
- Symphony No. 6, "Sinfonia Tragica" (1948)
- Symphony No. 7 in C major (1948)
- Symphony No. 8 in B♭ minor (1949)
- Symphony No. 9 in A minor (1951)
- Symphony No. 10 in C minor (1953–54)
- Symphony No. 11 in B♭ minor (1954)
- Symphony No. 12 (1957)
- Symphony No. 13 in C major (1959)
- Symphony No. 14 in F minor (1959–60)
- Symphony No. 15 in A major (1960)
- Symphony No. 16 in C♯ minor (1960)
- Symphony No. 17 (1960–61)
- Symphony No. 18 (1961)

- Dedicated to Bryan Fairfax, who in 1961 had conducted the first performance of Havergal Brian's Gothic Symphony. Fairfax conducted the Polyphonia Orchestra in the world premiere of the 18th Symphony in 1962.

- Symphony No. 19 in E minor (1961)
- Symphony No. 20 in C♯ minor (1962)
- Symphony No. 21 in E♭ major (1963)
- Symphony No. 22, "Symphonia Brevis" (1964–65)
- Symphony No. 23 (1965)
- Symphony No. 24 in D major (1965)
- Symphony No. 25 in A minor (1965–66)
- Symphony No. 26 (1966)
- Symphony No. 27 in C major (1966)
- Symphony No. 28 in C minor (1967)
- Symphony No. 29 in E♭ major (1967)
- Symphony No. 30 in B♭ minor (1967)
- Symphony No. 31 (1968)
- Symphony No. 32 in A♭ (1968)

=== Concerti ===
- Violin Concerto (1935)
- Cello Concerto (1964)

=== Other orchestral music ===
- English Suite No. 1 (1902–04)
- For Valour, Overture (1902, rev 1906)
- Burlesque Variations on an Original Theme (1903)
- Fantastic Variations on an Old Rhyme (1907) – Derived from the withdrawn Fantastic Symphony (Note: The "Old Rhyme" is "Three Blind Mice".)
- Festal Dance (1908) – Also derived from the withdrawn Fantastic Symphony
- In Memoriam, Symphonic Poem (1910)
- Doctor Merryheart, Comedy Overture No. 1 (1911–12)
- English Suite No. 3 (1919–21)
- Symphonic Variations on "Has anybody here seen Kelly?", from "The Tigers" (1921–22) - Arrangement by Ronald Stevenson
- Gargoyles, from "The Tigers" (1921–22)
- Green Pastures, from "The Tigers" (1921–22)
- Lacryma, from "The Tigers" (1921–22)
- Shadow Dance, from "The Tigers" (1921–22)
- Wild Horsemen, from "The Tigers" (1921–22)
- English Suite 4 "Kindergarten" (circa 1924)
- The Battle Song, Symphonic Poem (1930–31) – Completed by John Pickard in 1997
- The Tinker's Wedding, Comedy Overture No. 2 (1948)
- Three Pieces from Turandot, Act I (1950–51)
- Turandot Suite, from "Turandot" Acts II & III (1950–51) – Arrangement by Malcolm MacDonald
- Preludio Tragico, Overture to "The Cenci" (1951–52)
- Flourish, from "The Cenci" (1951–52)
- Fanfare, from "The Cenci", Banqueting Scene (1951–52) – Arrangement by Malcolm MacDonald
- Fanfare, from "The Cenci", Scene 7 (1951–52) – Arrangement by Malcolm MacDonald
- English Suite No. 5 "Rustic Scenes" (1953)
- Elegy, Symphonic Poem (1954)
- Abend, from "Faust" (1955–56)
- Night Ride of Faust and Mephistopheles, from "Faust" (1955–56)
- Prelude, from Faust Act 2 (1955–56)
- The Jolly Miller, Comedy Overture No. 3 (1962)
- Concerto for Orchestra (1964)
- Festival Fanfare (1967), for Brass Ensemble
- Legend "Ave atque vale" (1968)

=== Chorus, with or without piano ===
- Introit (1924), unaccompanied
- 27 unaccompanied partsongs
- 36 accompanied partsongs, with piano, one with flute & harp; seven of which are unison songs

=== Voice and orchestra ===
- Cathedral scene, from "Faust" Act 3 (1956), soprano, bass, choir & orchestra
- Gretchen songs, from "Faust" (1956), soprano & orchestra
- Herrick songs (1912), soprano, alto & orchestra
- Psalm 23 (1901, reconstructed 1945), tenor, choir & orchestra

=== Voice and piano ===
- 32 Songs

=== Chamber ensemble ===
- Legend (circa 1919–24), violin & piano

=== Piano ===
- Double Fugue in E♭ (1924)
- Three Illuminations (1916), with speaker
- Four Miniatures (1919–20)
- Prelude "John Dowland's Fancy" (1934)
- Prelude and Fugue in C minor (1924)
- Prelude and Fugue in D minor/major (1924)

=== Transcriptions ===
- Various on works by Arne, J.C. Bach, J.S. Bach, Berlioz, Elgar, Glinka, Gluck, Handel, Basil Maine, Spontini and Wagner.

== Recordings ==
The first commercial recording of Havergal Brian's music was made by the Leicestershire Schools Symphony Orchestra in 1972, when Symphonies Nos. 10 and 21, conducted by James Loughran and Eric Pinkett respectively, were recorded at the De Montfort Hall, Leicester. The producer was Robert Simpson. The LP was released by Unicorn Records in 1973. A special edition of the television programme Aquarius called The Unknown Warrior gave considerable coverage to the recording session and a camera crew joined members of the orchestra during a visit they made to the composer's home in Shoreham.

During the 1970s a number of unofficial releases of Brian symphonies were made. These generally were of BBC recordings, and the recordings were released under fictitious names. Several have now had official releases.

In 1979, Cameo Classics embarked on a project to record all of Brian's orchestral music in collaboration with the Havergal Brian Society. It started with the English Suite No. 1, Doctor Merryheart, and Fantastic Variations on an Old Rhyme. In 1980 came the second LP containing In Memoriam, For Valour, and Festal Dance. The project was completed in 1981 with the recordings of Burlesque Variations on an Original Theme, and Two Herrick Songs, Requiem for the Rose and The Hag. The recordings were produced by David Kent-Watson with the Hull Youth Orchestra conducted by Geoffrey Heald-Smith. For the recording of Brian's complete piano music, Cameo Classics employed digital technology. Peter Hill's performances on a Bösendorfer Imperial at the Northern College of Music earned high praise from John Ogdon in his review for Tempo.

More of Brian's works have been published since the 1980s and '90s, and the scarcity of well-rehearsed performances or mature interpretations that had previously made the quality of his music difficult to assess has been partially corrected through the series of professional recordings of many of Brian's symphonies that have been issued by the Marco Polo record label on CD. Many of the original recordings on various labels are being reissued, and by the end of 2018 all of Brian's symphonies had at least one official recording, although not necessarily in print.

In August 2010, the Dutton CD label issued three works taken from 1959 BBC broadcasts: the Comedy Overture Doctor Merryheart and 11th Symphony (with Harry Newstone conducting the London Symphony Orchestra) and the 9th Symphony (Norman del Mar and the LSO). This release followed on from Testament's reissue of the live recording of the 1966 Boult performance in the Royal Albert Hall of Brian's Gothic Symphony. In the 2011 Proms concert season the symphony was conducted by Martyn Brabbins in the Royal Albert Hall; the performance is now available on a commercial recording.

In July 2012, a documentary film, "The Curse of the Gothic Symphony" was released in Australian cinemas. Directed by Randall Wood, it is a dramatised documentary of the trials and tribulations of staging Brian's Gothic Symphony in Brisbane, Queensland. Filmed over five years, the task of gathering 200 musicians and 400 choristers came to fruition in 2010 in a performance and standing ovation in Brisbane's Performing Arts centre.

=== Symphonies ===
Here is a partial list of known recordings for Havergal Brian's symphonies; many are out of print, others have never been released commercially; some have been released in bootleg format or exist in BBC archives:

No.	Key/name	Conductor	Orchestra	Recording Date	CD version
1	D minor, "The Gothic"	Adrian Boult	BBCSO	1966	Yes
1	D minor, "The Gothic"	Ondrej Lenárd	Slovak Philharmonic Orchestra, Slovak Radio Symphony Orchestra	1989	Yes
1	D minor, "The Gothic"	Martyn Brabbins	BBC National Chorus of Wales, BBC Concert Orchestra	2010	Yes
2	E minor	Anthony Rowe	Moscow Symphony Orchestra	2007	Yes
2	E minor	Martyn Brabbins	Royal Scottish National Orchestra	2016	Yes
3	C♯ minor	Stanley Pope	New Philharmonic Orchestra	1974	Yes
3	C♯ minor	Lionel Friend	BBCSO	1988	Yes
4	"Das Siegeslied" (Psalm of Victory)	Adrian Leaper	Slovak Radio Symphony Orchestra	2007	Yes
5	"The Wine of Summer"	Martyn Brabbins	Royal Scottish National Orchestra	2015	Yes
6	"Sinfonia Tragica"	Myer Fredman	London Philharmonic Orchestra	1975	Yes
6	"Sinfonia Tragica"	Alexander Walker	New Russia State Symphony Orchestra	2014	Yes
6	"Sinfonia Tragica"	Martyn Brabbins	English National Opera Orchestra	2024	Yes
7	C major	Charles Mackerras	Royal Liverpool Philharmonic Orchestra	1978	Yes
7	C major	Alexander Walker	New Russia State Symphony Orchestra	2018	Yes
8	B♭ minor	Charles Groves	RLPO	1978	Yes
8	B♭ minor	Alexander Walker	New Russia State Symphony Orchestra	2017	Yes
8	B♭ minor	Rudolf Schwarz	BBCSO	1958	Web(e)
8	B♭ minor	Myer Fredman	Royal Philharmonic Orchestra	1971	Yes
9	A minor	Norman Del Mar	LSO	1959	Yes
9	A minor	Charles Groves	RLPO	1978	Yes
9	A minor	Myer Fredman	Royal Philharmonic Orchestra	1971	Yes
10	C minor	Stanley Pope	Philharmonia Orchestra	1958	Web(e)
10	C minor	Martyn Brabbins	Royal Scottish National Orchestra	2010	Yes
10	C minor	James Loughran	Leicestershire Schools Symphony Orchestra	1973	Yes
11	untitled	Harry Newstone	LSO	1959	Yes
11	untitled	Adrian Leaper	National Symphony Orchestra of Ireland	1993	Yes
12	untitled	Adrian Leaper	CSR Symphony Orchestra (Bratislava)	1992	Yes
12	untitled	Harry Newstone	LSO	1959	Web (e)
12	untitled	Martyn Brabbins	English National Opera Orchestra	2024	Yes
13	C major	Martyn Brabbins	Royal Scottish National Orchestra	2012	Yes
14	F minor	Edward Downes	LSO^{&}	1969	
14	F minor	Anthony Rowe	National Symphony Orchestra of Ireland	1997	Yes
14	F minor	Martyn Brabbins	Royal Scottish National Orchestra	2016	Yes
15	untitled	Anthony Rowe	RTÉ National Symphony Orchestra	1997	Yes
16	untitled	Myer Fredman	London Philharmonic Orchestra	1973	Yes
16	untitled	Alexander Walker	New Russia State Symphony Orchestra	2018	Yes
17	untitled	Stanley Pope	New Philharmonic Orchestra	1976	Yes
17	untitled	Adrian Leaper	National Symphony Orchestra of Ireland	1992	Yes
18	untitled	Lionel Friend	BBC Scottish Symphony Orchestra	1993	Yes
19	E minor	John Canarina	BBC Scottish Symphony Orchestra^{&}	1976	
19	E minor	Martyn Brabbins	Royal Scottish National Orchestra	2015	Yes
20	C♯ minor	Andrew Penny	National Symphony Orchestra of Ukraine	1994	Yes
21	E♭	Eric Pinkett	Leicestershire Schools Symphony Orchestra	1973	Yes
21	E♭	Alexander Walker	New Russia State Symphony Orchestra	2017	Yes
22	"Symphonia Brevis"	László Heltay	Leicestershire Schools Symphony Orchestra ^{&}	1974	Yes (d)
22	"Symphonia Brevis"	Alexander Walker	New Russia State Symphony Orchestra	2012	Yes
22	"Symphonia Brevis"	Myer Fredman	Royal Philharmonic Orchestra	1971	Yes
23	untitled	Alexander Walker	New Russia State Symphony Orchestra	2012	Yes
24	D major	Myer Fredman	LPO ^{&&}	1975	
24	D major	Alexander Walker	New Russia State Symphony Orchestra	2012	Yes
25	A minor	Andrew Penny	NSO Ukraine	1994	Yes
26	untitled	Vernon Handley	New Philharmonia Orchestra ^{&&&}	1976	
26	untitled	Alexander Walker	New Russia State Symphony Orchestra	2017	Yes
27	C minor	Charles Mackerras	Philharmonia Orchestra^{&&&&}	1979	
27	C minor	Martyn Brabbins	Royal Scottish National Orchestra	2015	Yes
28	C minor	Alexander Walker	New Russia State Symphony Orchestra	2014	Yes
29	E♭	Nicholas Smith	North Staffordshire Symphony Orchestra^{&&&&}	1976	
29	E♭	Myer Fredman	Philharmonia Orchestra	1979	Yes
29	E♭	Alexander Walker	New Russia State Symphony Orchestra	2014	Yes
30	B♭ minor	Martyn Brabbins	RSNO	2010	Yes
30	B♭ minor	Lionel Friend	BBC Symphony Orchestra	1991	Yes
31	untitled	Charles Mackerras	RLPO	1987	Yes
31	untitled	Sir Charles Mackerras	Philharmonia Orchestra	1979	Yes
31	untitled	Alexander Walker	New Russia State Symphony Orchestra	2014	Yes
32	untitled	Adrian Leaper	National Symphony Orchestra of Ireland	1992	Yes
32	untitled	Myer Fredman	Philharmonia Orchestra	1979	Yes

&=out of print LP
&&=released on a pirated LP with apocryphal attributions to Horst Werner (conductor)/ Hamburg Philharmonic
&&&= released in a (pirated) LP box-set with (presumed) apocryphal attributions to John Freedman (conductor)/ Edinburgh Youth Symphony Orchestras
&&&&=recording from original BBC broadcast exists, not commercially released
&&&&&=recording from BBC radio 3 exists, not commercially released; a pirated LP (Aries LP-1607) with apocryphal attributions to Horst Werner (conductor)/ Hamburg Philharmonic is reported and refers to this Stokowski performance
d=cd was made, but is now deleted from catalogue
e=recording is in the public domain and is available from the Havergal Brian Society webpage
Both the Leicestershire Schools Symphony Orchestra recordings have been remastered and rereleased.
Many of the BBC recordings are freely available for download with registration.

== Books ==
- Eastaugh, Kenneth. Havergal Brian, the making of a composer. London: Harrap. c 1976. ISBN 0-245-52748-6
- MacDonald, Malcolm. The Symphonies of Havergal Brian (Discussion in 3 volumes—volume 1: Symphonies 1–12; volume 2: Symphonies 13–29; volume 3: Symphonies 30–32, Survey, and Summing-up.) London: Kahn & Averill, 1974–1983. ISBN 0-900707-28-3.
- MacDonald, Malcolm, ed. Havergal Brian on music: selections from his journalism. London: Toccata Press, c 1986. ISBN 0-907689-19-1 (v.1), c 2009 ISBN 0-907689-48-5 (v.2).
- Nettel, Reginald. Ordeal by Music: The Strange Experience of Havergal Brian. London and New York: Oxford University Press. c 1945.
- Nettel, Reginald (also Foreman, Lewis). Havergal Brian and his music. London: Dobson. c 1976. ISBN 0-234-77861-X.
- Matthew-Walker, Robert. Havergal Brian: Reminiscences and Observations. DGR Books 1995. ISBN 1-898343-04-7.
- Schaarwächter, Jürgen, ed. HB: Aspects of Havergal Brian. Aldershot, Brookfield, Singapore & Sydney: Ashgate. c. 1997. ISBN 1-84014-238-3.
