= Henry Herford =

Scottish baritone singer (1947–2026)

- Born: Richard Henry Herford; 24 February 1947; Edinburgh, Scotland
- Died: 31 July 2026 (aged 79)
- Education: Cambridge University; Royal Northern College of Music

Richard Henry Herford (24 February 1947 – 31 July 2026) was a Scottish baritone singer.

== Life and career ==
Born in Edinburgh on 24 February 1947, he grew up in Glasgow. He read Classics and English at Cambridge University, and studied singing at the Royal Northern College of Music in Manchester where he was awarded the Curtis Gold Medal. As of 2010 he was the RNCM's Tutor in French Song. He also taught at the Birmingham Conservatoire and the Royal College of Music in London, and founded the Abingdon Summer School for Solo Singers. He joined the Glyndebourne Opera Chorus for 1977 and 1978, singing leading roles on tour, and since then performed over seventy roles with opera companies throughout the UK and Europe, including at Covent Garden, Glyndebourne and Scottish Opera.

Notable among his roles were the Count (The Marriage of Figaro), Guglielmo and Alfonso (Così fan tutte), the title role in Don Giovanni, Germont (La Traviata), Silvio (I Pagliacci), Dr Falke (Die Fledermaus), the Forester (The Cunning Little Vixen), Smirnov (William Walton's The Bear), and Demetrius (A Midsummer Night's Dream), which he recorded for Virgin Records.

Herford's other recordings include two volumes of songs by Charles Ives; a disc of songs by John Corigliano, Arthur Shepherd, Ben Weber and Conrad Susa; a disc of Dylan Thomas settings by Peter Dickinson; a two-CD set of the songs of Arthur Bliss; and a recording of Vaughan Williams's Five Mystical Songs with the Philharmonia Orchestra under Hilary Davan Wetton. He was also featured on recordings of Handel's Dixit Dominus and Israel in Egypt with the King's College Choir under Stephen Cleobury.

Barry MIllington of The Guardian considered Herford's affecting performances in lesser-known repertory to be his most notable contribution to opera in Britain. These roles included Hercules in Gluck's Alceste, Artaxerxes in Cesti's La Dori, Orpheus in Milhaud's Les malheurs d’Orphée, Roderick in a reconstruction of Debussy's unfinished La chute de la Maison Usher, Creon in Haydn's L'anima del filosofo, and the Duke in Stephen Storace's Gli equivoci.

Herford died on 31 July 2026, aged 79.
