= Martyn Brabbins =

British conductor

Martyn Charles Brabbins (born 13 August 1959) is a British conductor, who has held posts in the UK and beyond and has an extensive discography.

== Biography ==
The fourth of five children in his family, he learned to play the euphonium, and then the trombone during his youth at Towcester Studio Brass Band. He later studied composition at Goldsmiths, University of London. He subsequently studied conducting for two years with Ilya Musin at the Leningrad Conservatory.

Brabbins first came to international attention when he was awarded first prize at the Leeds Conductors Competition in 1988. Between 1994 and 2005, Brabbins was Associate Principal Conductor of the BBC Scottish Symphony Orchestra. He became principal conductor of 'Sinfonia 21' in 1994. He was artistic director of the Cheltenham Music Festival from 2005 to 2007. During his Cheltenham tenure, he established a new ensemble, the Festival Players. In Leeds, he created a new chamber music series called "Music in Transition". On 17 July 2011, Brabbins conducted the 6th live performance of Havergal Brian's Symphony No. 1 "The Gothic", at The Proms, which was later released on a Hyperion commercial recording. Brabbins was subsequently named president of the Havergal Brian Society. Brabbins is also conductor laureate of the Huddersfield Choral Society, with which he recorded Elgar's Dream of Gerontius in April 2025. In 2002, Brabbins founded a training course for aspiring conductors at the St Magnus International Festival in Orkney, which he continues to co-direct. He is currently honorary president of the Edinburgh Royal Choral Union.

Outside of the UK, Brabbins became principal guest conductor of deFilharmonie (Royal Flemish Philharmonic) in 2009. He held the position of chief conductor of the Nagoya Philharmonic Orchestra from 2012 to 2016.

Brabbins first guest-conducted at English National Opera (ENO) in 2001, in a production of David Sawer's From Morning to Midnight. On 21 October 2016, ENO named Brabbins its next music director; among operas he conducted there were Pilgrim's Progress, The Cunning Little Vixen, and Gloriana. On 15 October 2023, Brabbins resigned from ENO, with immediate effect, in protest at proposed reductions to the company's music staff, stating "Although making cuts has been necessitated by Arts Council England’s interference in the company’s future, the proposed changes would drive a coach and horses through the artistic integrity of the whole of ENO as a performing company, while also singularly failing to protect our musicians’ livelihoods. This is a plan of managed decline, rather than an attempt to rebuild the company and maintain the world-class artistic output for which ENO is rightly famed."

In June 2024, the Malmö Symphony Orchestra announced the appointment of Brabbins as its next chief conductor, effective with the 2025-2026 season, with an initial contract of three seasons.

== Recordings ==
Brabbins has conducted commercial recordings of music for such labels as Warner, Chandos, Hyperion, NMC, Nimbus, and Deutsche Grammophon. His commercial recordings include the official first recording of Michael Tippett's opera New Year.

== Personal life ==
Brabbins and his wife Karen (née Evans) met at Goldsmiths. The couple married in 1985, and have three children. In January 2013, the University of Bristol awarded Brabbins an honorary degree, of Doctor of Music honoris causa.

Cultural offices
Preceded by Michael Berkeley	Artistic Director, Cheltenham Music Festival; 2005–2007	Succeeded by Meurig Bowen
Preceded by Thierry Fischer	Chief Conductor, Nagoya Philharmonic Orchestra; 2012–2016	Succeeded by Kazuhiro Koizumi
Preceded by Mark Wigglesworth	Music Director, English National Opera; 2016–2023	Succeeded by André de Ridder (designate, effective 2027)
Preceded by Robert Treviño	Chief Conductor, Malmö Symphony Orchestra; 2025–present	Succeeded by incumbent
