= Eric Pinkett =

British music promoter and conductor (1910–1979)

- Born: 1910
- Died: 1979 (aged 68–69)
- Occupation: Conductor

Eric Pinkett O.B.E. (1910–1979), was the founder of the internationally famous Leicestershire Schools Symphony Orchestra. He established the Leicestershire County School of Music in 1948 and continued to conduct the orchestra (as well as being the county's principal music advisor) until his retirement in 1976.

His memoirs were published in 1969 by way of a 21st anniversary tribute to the LSSO in a book called Time to Remember.

A regular visitor to the recording studio, Eric Pinkett conducted works by Havergal Brian, Malcolm Arnold, Bryan Kelly and David Bedford with the LSSO for the CBS, Unicorn, Pye, Argo and Virgin record labels.

During his involvement with musical education in Leicestershire, he was known as "Mr Music".

In April 2007, a new housing development by Rippon Homes was opened in Thurmaston on the site of Eric Pinkett's family home. The new development has been named Symphony Gardens in his honour.
