= List of compositions by Robert Simpson =

This list of compositions by Robert Simpson is a list of the musical compositions of Robert Simpson sorted by genre.

== Symphonies ==
Robert Simpson is said to have written and destroyed four Symphonies (one of which even used serial procedures) before his first published Symphony. He submitted his official

- Symphony No. 1 (1951), doctorate thesis for the University of Durham
- Symphony No. 2 (1955–1956), dedicated to Anthony Bernard
- Symphony No. 3 (1962), dedicated to Havergal Brian
- Symphony No. 4 (1970–1972), commissioned by the Hallé Orchestra
- Symphony No. 5 (1972), dedicated to the London Symphony Orchestra
- Symphony No. 6 (1977), dedicated to the renowned gynecologist Ian Craft
- Symphony No. 7 (1977), dedicated to Hans Keller and his wife, the artist Milein Cosman
- Symphony No. 8 (1981), dedicated to the painter Anthony Dorrell
- Symphony No. 9 (1985–1987), dedicated to his wife, Angela
- Symphony No. 10 (1988), dedicated to Vernon Handley
- Symphony No. 11 (1990), dedicated to Matthew Taylor

== String quartets ==
Simpson composed 15 numbered string quartets; a quartet preceding this sequence was written as part of his course at Durham University and may still exist there. He regarded Quartets No. s 1 - 3 as forming a natural sequence, and No. s 4 - 6 are a clearly distinct group related to three Beethoven quartets, though they can all be performed as entirely independent compositions.

- String Quartet No. 1 (1951–1952)
- String Quartet No. 2 (1953)
- String Quartet No. 3 (1953–1954)
- String Quartet No. 4 (1973), dedicated to Basil Lam
- String Quartet No. 5 (1974), dedicated to Angela Musgrave
- String Quartet No. 6 (1975), dedicated to the film-maker Barrie Gavin and his wife Jamila
- String Quartet No. 7 (1977), dedicated to the organist Susi Jeans and written in celebration of the birth-centenary of her husband, the astronomer Sir James Jeans
- String Quartet No. 8 (1979), dedicated to the biologist and entomologist J.D. Gillett and his wife
- String Quartet No. 9 (1982) is subtitled 32 Variations and Fugue on a Theme of Haydn and was dedicated to the Delmé Quartet, who commissioned it, on their 20th anniversary, which was also the 250th anniversary of the birth of Haydn
- String Quartet No. 10 (1983) bears the title For Peace and was composed for the tenth anniversary of the Coull Quartet
- String Quartet No. 11 (1984), also written for the Coull Quartet
- String Quartet No. 12 (1987) was commissioned for the 1988 Nottingham Festival
- String Quartet No. 13 (1989) was commissioned for the 1990 Cardiff Festival and was premiered there by the Delmé Quartet. It is dedicated to the BBC producer Graham Melville-Mason and his wife Alex.
- String Quartet No. 14 (1990)
- String Quartet No. 15 (1991)

== Concerti ==
- Violin Concerto (1959)
- Piano Concerto (1967)
- Flute Concerto (1989)
- Cello Concerto (1991)

== Other orchestral music ==
- Allegro Deciso for Strings (1954)
- Variations on a Theme of Carl Nielsen for Orchestra (1983)
- Variations and Fugue on a theme by Bach for strings (Saraband) (1991)
- Variations on Happy Birthday (for William Walton's Birthday)(Date Unknown)

== Other chamber music ==
- Variations and Fugue for Recorder and String Quartet (1959) - thought to be lost but reconstructed in 2000 from parts by John B. Turner.
- Trio for Clarinet, Cello and Piano (1967)
- Quintet for Clarinet and String Quartet (1968)
- Quartet for Horn, Violin, Cello and Piano (1975)
- Quintet for Clarinet, Bass Clarinet and String Trio (1981)
- Trio for Horn, Violin and Piano (1984)
- Sonata for Violin and Piano (1984)
- String Trio (1987)
- String Quintet No. 1 (1987)
- Trio for Violin, Cello and Piano (1988–89)
- Brass Quintet (1989)
- String Quintet No. 2 (1995)

== Incidental music ==
- Incidental music to Ibsen's play The Pretenders (1965)
- Incidental music to Milton's play Samson Agonistes (1974)
- Entr'acte (Date Unknown)

== Vocal ==
- Media morte in vita sumus (1975) (for chorus, brass and timpani)
- Tempi, for full mixed voice chorus a capella (1987)

== Compositions for brass band ==
- Canzona for Brass (1958)
- Energy (1971), Test Piece, Brass Band World Championships
- Volcano (1979), Test Piece, National Brass Band Championships of Britain
- The Four Temperaments, Suite for Brass Band (1983)
- Introduction and Allegro on a Bass of Max Reger (1987)
- Vortex (1989)

== Compositions for keyboard instruments ==
- Piano Sonata (1946)
- Variations and Finale on a Theme of Haydn for solo piano (1948)
- Sonata for two pianos (1979)
- Michael Tippett, His Mystery for solo piano (1984)
- Eppur si muove, Ricercar and Passacaglia for organ (1985)
- Variations and Finale on a Theme by Beethoven for solo piano (1990)

== Arrangements ==
- Arrangement of Die Kunst der Fuge - Contrapunctus No's 1-13 (Bach/Simpson) (Date Unknown)
- Transcription of Comotio (for piano, four hands) (Nielsen/Simpson) (Date Unknown)
