= Symphony No. 76 (Haydn) =

Symphony in four movements by Joseph Haydn

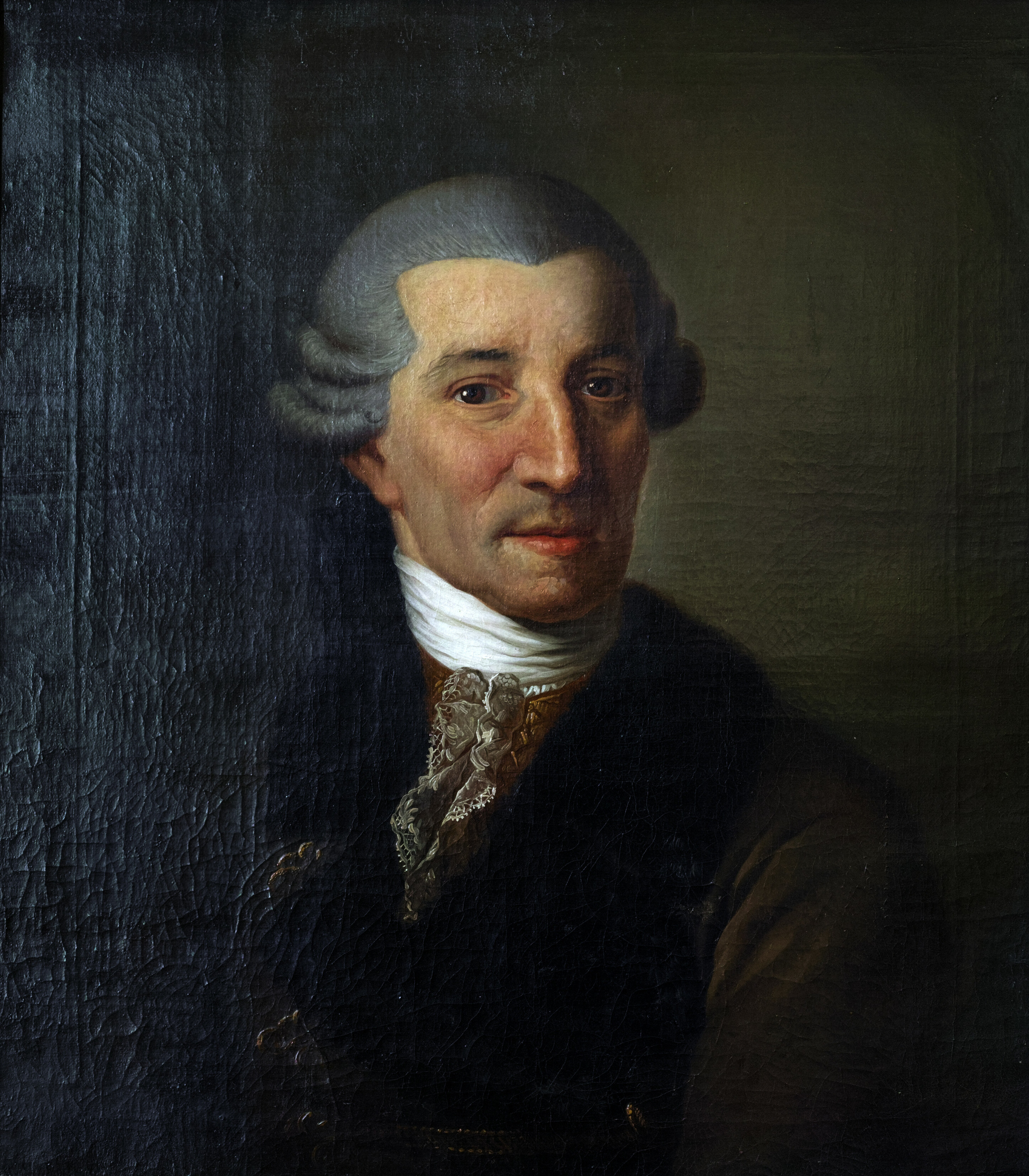
Portrait of Joseph Haydn by Christian Ludwig Seehas, 1785

Symphony No. 76 in E♭ major (Hoboken 1/76) is a symphony by Joseph Haydn completed in 1782.

== Early set of symphonies for London ==
In 1782, almost a decade before Haydn composed the first of his famous London symphonies, he composed a trio of symphonies – 76, 77 and 78 – for a trip to London which fell through. Haydn wrote the following to his Paris music publisher Boyer on 15 July 1783:

Last year I composed 3 beautiful, magnificent and by no means over-lengthy Symphonies, scored for 2 violins, viola, basso, 2 horns, 2 oboes, 1 flute and 1 bassoon – but they are all very easy, and without too much concertante – for the English gentlemen, and I intended to bring them over myself and produce them there: but a certain circumstance hindered that plan, and so I am willing to hand over these 3 Symphonies.

It is not known how much Haydn knew of the tastes of English audiences, but the three symphonies do possess a polish and style typical of London composers such as Johann Christian Bach and Carl Friedrich Abel. As noted in the letter, the winds have very few measures where they do not support the strings, they are used primarily to add color.

== Music ==
The symphony is scored for flute, two oboes, two bassoons, two horns, and strings.

There are four movements:

1. Allegro, 3/4
2. Adagio, ma non troppo
3. Menuetto & Trio: Allegretto, 3/4
4. Finale: Allegro ma non troppo, 2/2

The slow movement is a rondo with two episodes. The first two instances of the refrain are scored for strings only while the episodes and the final refrain are scored for the full orchestra. The first episode is in the minor and features the winds softly playing over the low strings while the second episode is much more agitated and features the full tutti. Each recurrence of the refrain is enhanced with improvisatory variation, so that when the final refrain settles on a cadential chord and breaks into a cadenza, the listener is not surprised.

== Use in Robert Simpson's Fourth Symphony ==
English composer Robert Simpson, a great admirer of Haydn's music, used a theme from the second group of the first movement of this symphony in his Symphony No.4 of 1792. Here the theme is used in the Scherzo second movement to signify imperturbability; the main scherzo theme batters against it in vain, and after it disappears from the music the scherzo theme is even more enraged than it was before.
