= Gerald Drucker =

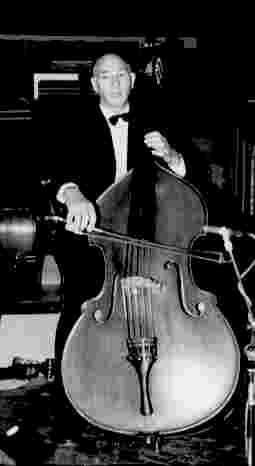

Background information
- Born: 5 August 1925; London, United Kingdom
- Died: 19 March 2010 (aged 84)
- Genres: Classical
- Occupations: Double-bassist, photographer
- Instrument: Double-bass
- Years active: ca. 1940–1995

Gerald Drucker (5 August 1925 – 19 March 2010) was a British classical double bass player, photographer and double bass teacher. Principal Double Bass at the Yorkshire Symphony Orchestra, BBC Symphony Orchestra, New Philharmonia Orchestra, and finally the Philharmonia Orchestra of London. He formed the London Double Bass Ensemble in the 1980s.

== Biography ==
Drucker was offered the position of principal double bass with the Yorkshire Symphony Orchestra at the age of 20. He learned the violin as a child and switched to the double bass at 16. In 1953 came to London to lead the section in the BBC Symphony Orchestra under Sir Malcolm Sargent. He was appointed Principal Double Bass of the New Philharmonia Orchestra (later the Philharmonia Orchestra) in 1964, under Otto Klemperer, and subsequently with Lorin Maazel who held the post of associate principal conductor. Riccardo Muti was principal conductor from 1973 to 1982. Giuseppe Sinopoli succeeded Muti. After he left the Philharmonia, Gerald continued in music as artist director promoting amongst others Vanessa-Mae and later of Min Jin (Violin) and Min Jung (Piano).

He started his career as a violinist with the Boyd Neel String Orchestra at the age of 16, and was soon also playing with the Jacques Orchestra which was founded by Reginald Jacques five years previously. At the Guildhall School of Music he studied violin, viola, French horn (with Dennis Brain) and tuba in addition to the double bass. Poor eyesight prevented a wartime call-up in 1939–1940, so he earned pocket money playing in dance bands (often with the American bandleader Xavier Cugat at the Waldorf-Astoria hotel in New York. His first professional engagement in London during the war had been playing the organ at St Mary Magdalene church, Holloway Road, subsequently working as a violinist or violist with both the leading chamber orchestras of the time, the Boyd Neel Orchestra and the Jacques String Orchestra.and his first encounter with the double bass was when he was invited to fill in for double bassist Gordon Pearce at an ENSA concert for Canadian Troops on the south coast prior to D-day in 1944. Asked to join the BBC Symphony Orchestra under Sir Malcolm Sargent in 1953, when the principal Stuart Knussen moved to the London Symphony Orchestra, Drucker relocated to London and stayed at the BBC until 1964, once deputising on the tuba at short notice in Walton's First Symphony. That year he was invited to join Walter Legge's Philharmonia Orchestra under Otto Klemperer, at the time one of the finest recording orchestras in the world. He has appeared as soloist in concerto performances, including performances of work by Bottesini and Virgilio Mortari (including in "Bottesini's Grand Duo for violin and Double Bass and Mortari's double bass concerto) with the Philharmonia under Riccardo Muti at the Royal Festival Hall on 16 February 1978. Drucker was involved in many freelance sessions over the years including at Abbey Road Studios where amongst others he and fellow Philharmonia double bass player Gordon Pearce were involved in the recording of the Beatles Sgt. Pepper's Lonely Hearts Club Band album. He thoroughly enjoyed playing music and exploring the TARDIS set in the Doctor Who cult science fiction BBC TV series during his involvement in the 1960s–1970s including with Tom Baker in The Ribos Operation. Other session examples notably include his involvement in over 13 James Bond 007 films with composer John Barry amongst others as the John Barry Orchestra between 1963 and 1990, and included working closely with Paul McCartney on "Live and Let Die" which is the main theme song of the 1973 James Bond film Live and Let Die, written by Paul and Linda McCartney and performed by Paul's band Wings. Drucker was solo bass player in the Anton Chekhov film Romance with a Double Bass released in 1974 with John Cleese as the main character. In 1980 he formed a unique group, the London Double Bass Ensemble, comprising a nucleus of four double basses, to perform original works in concert with other instruments. Drucker commissioned a new piece of work by the English composer Robert Simpson in 1981, Quintet for Clarinet, Bass Clarinet and String Trio (Simpson) which was performed by the London Double Bass Ensemble at Wigmore Hall that year. Gerald was succeeded by Neil Tarlton as Principal Bass at the Philharmonia Orchestra.

Gerald Drucker mentioned in "Philharmonia Orchestra: a record of achievement 1945–1985"

In the 1990s he taught Double Bass at the National Centre for Orchestral Studies Goldsmiths' College. After 50 years as a concert artist he retired in 1990 as Principal Bass and Principal Photographer of the Philharmonia Orchestra of London, to the suburbs of London. Following retirement however, he continued to play an active role in music establishing the Covent Garden Soloists Ltd, organising the anniversary Far East tour of the London Mozart Players, and mentoring violinists Vanessa Mae and Min Jin Kym and the pianist Hiromi Okada.

Legendary Maestro Riccardo Muti, discusses conducting the Philharmonia Orchestra, as he prepares for the Orchestra's 65th Birthday Gala Concert at the Royal Festival Hall in London where he recollects Gerald Drucker the day before his funeral.

A memorial concert was held in Gerald Drucker's honour on 28 July 2010 by his family, friends, colleagues and former students at the Henry Wood Hall, a venue where he played many times over the years.

== Discography ==
Solo examples online

- Romance with a Double Bass(Movie sound track. Leon Cohen composer (1974).Romance of a Double Bass

Example Orchestral record, CD and DVD recordings credited online

- Bach Mass in B Minor. New Philharmonia Orchestra (1968))
- The Golden Echo: Concertos for Horn (1985). Philharmonia Orchestra directed by Christopher Warren-Green. Composed by Antonio Rosetti, Antonio Vivaldi, Franz Joseph Haydn, Leopold Mozart. Nimbus, 1985. http://www.alibris.com/The-Golden-Echo-Concertos-for-Horn/classical/700155274?matches=3 Gerald Drucker discography.
- Dvorak. Serenade for strings. Op. 22. Serenade for wind. Op. 44. Philharmonia Orchestra directed by Christopher Warren-Green. Chandos Records. 1986. Gerald Drucker discography.
- Classical Horn Concertos. Philharmonia Orchestra. 2012. Nimbus Records.ASIN: B0072RY2RG )

=== Example Films and film sound tracks credited online ===
- Romance with a Double Bass(Movie sound track. Leon Cohen composer (1974).Romance of a Double Bass
- Lawrence of Arabia, film score by Maurice Jarre (1962)
- Les Misérables (date)
- Big Country (date)

=== Example Radio broadcasts credited online ===
- Park Lane Ensemble Conducted by Jacques-Louis Monod. Broadcast by the BBC Radio 3. Sunday 6 Match 1966. )
- Biber Sonata Sancti Polycarpi a 9 BENGT EKLUND 'S BAROQUE ENSEMBLE/ 1 March 1987. BBC Radio 3.

=== Examples of Television broadcasts credited online ===
1965 Stravinsky, The Firebird, Suite No. 3 9. Lullaby (excerpt. ) New Philharmonia Orchestra. Igor Stravinsky, conductor. Excerpt from an archive footage recorded in 1965 at the Royal Festival Hall – London, Great Britain.

1965 – Mozart's Symphony n°40 in G minor, conducted by Carlo-Maria Giulini and recorded in England in 1965 with the New Philharmonia Orchestra. Gerald Drucker and bass section viewed in the clip at 1.10 and 1.32 mins. Wolfgang Amadeus Mozart: Symphony No. 40 in G minor, KV 550; Manuel de Falla: El Sombrero de Tres Picos (The Three-cornered Hat), Suite No. 2; Giuseppe Verdi: I Vespri Siciliani (Sicilian Vespers), Overture.

1960s–1970s * Dr Who first series (1960s)

1970 Beethoven Symphony No.7-Mov.4. New Philharmonia Orchestra. Conducted by Otto Klemperer. Live broadcast at the Royal Festival Hall, London – 1970 Gerald Drucker (extreme left) and Bass section cleally seen on TV at 3.54 mins. and 7.31 mins on this YouTube clip

1970 Beethoven Symphony No.7 in A, Op.92. New Philharmonia Orchestra. Conducted by Otto Klemperer. Live broadcast at the Royal Festival Hall, London – 1970 Gerald Drucker (extreme left) and Bass section close up camera shot on TV at 1.14 mins., 23.01 and 34.26 and 41.09 the latter with close up of Gordon Pearce and his double bass playing, and 42.54 mins. on this YouTube clip

1970 Beethoven Symphony No.6 (Pastoral) OTTO KLEMPERER. New Philharmonia Orchestra. Conducted by Otto Klemperer. Live broadcast at the Royal Festival Hall, London – 1970 Gerald Drucker (extreme left) and Bass section close up camera shot on TV at 32.14 mins. on this YouTube clip

ca 1970. Espansiva: a Portrait of Carl Nielsen BBCTV "Workshop" presentation Producer and Director: Barrie Gavin (1970 ca.) Script by Robert Simpson. New Philharmonia Orchestra. Leader: Emanuel Hurwitz. Solo clarinet: Jack McCaw, Sidedrum: Alfred Dukes. cond. Jascha Horenstein.

== Photography ==
He specialised in photographing orchestras and classical musicians from the early 1960s, being honoured with the unique title of 'Principal Photographer' whilst at the Philharmonia Orchestra. Photographs have been printed all round the world, in newspapers, journals, magazines and books. Notable photographs include those of Otto Klemperer, Riccardo Muti, Douglas Fairbanks, Jr., Ansel Adams and Lillian Gish. He collaborated with Pamela Weston to provide the photography in the book Clarinet virtuosi of today.

Examples of photography by Gerald Drucker include:

×1985 Haydn: Trumpet and Horn Concertos. Christopher Warren-Green. Gerald Drucker album photographer ×1988 Hindemith, Janáček, Vackár: Music for Brass, Piano and Percussion. Radoslav Kvapil / Wallace Collection / John Wallace. Gerald Drucker album photographer ×1989 Rule Brittania John Wallace. Gerald Drucker album photographer ×1989 Venetian Oboe Concertos. Gerald Drucker album photographer ×1991 Tausch: Double Clarinet Concertos, Opp. 26, 27; Süssmayr: Concerto Mouvement in D. Thea King. Gerald Drucker album photographer ×1992 Respighi: The Ballad of Gnomes; Adagio with Variations; Botticelli Pictures; Suite in G. Geoffrey Simon. Gerald Drucker album photographer ×1999 Arias for Soprano & Trumpet. Helen Field / John Wallace. Gerald Drucker album photographer ×1999 Berlioz and the French Revolution. John Wallace. Gerald Drucker album photographer ×1999 Haydn: Trumpet & Horn Concertos. Christopher Warren-Green. Gerald Drucker album photographer ×1999 Man: The Measure of All Things Christopher Warren-Green. Gerald Drucker album photographer ×1999 Origin of the Species, Gerald Drucker album photographer ×1999 T for Trumpeter. John Wallace. Gerald Drucker album photographer ×1999 Telemann: Trumpet Concertos. John Wallace. Gerald Drucker album photographer ×1999 The Stars & Stripes Forever. John Wallace. Gerald Drucker album photographer 1999 Venetian Brass Music. Wallace Collection. Photography 1999 Virtuoso Trumpet Concertos. John Wallace. Gerald Drucker album photography 1999 Windows. John Wallace. Gerald Drucker album photography

== See also ==
- Giovanni Bottesini
- Domenico Dragonetti
- Philharmonia Orchestra of London
- Riccardo Muti
