= String Quartet No. 15 =

String Quartet No. 15 may refer to:

- String Quartet No. 15 (Beethoven) by Ludwig van Beethoven
- String Quartet No. 15 (Hill) by Alfred Hill
- String Quartet No. 15 (Milhaud), Op. 291, No. 2, by Darius Milhaud
- String Quartet No. 15 (Mozart) by Wolfgang Amadeus Mozart
- String Quartet No. 15 (Schubert) by Franz Schubert
- String Quartet No. 15 (Shostakovich) by Dmitri Shostakovich
- String Quartet No. 15 (Simpson) by Robert Simpson
- String Quartet No. 15 (Spohr) by Louis Spohr
- String Quartet No. 15 (Villa-Lobos) by Heitor Villa-Lobos
