= London Double Bass Ensemble =

- Genres: Classical
- Occupation: Double-bassist,
- Instrument: Double-bass
- Years active: ca. 1981–1995

The London Double Bass Ensemble (6 members) was established by members of the Philharmonia Orchestra of London in 1981. The ensemble has performed on television and radio and at venues including the South Bank and Wigmore Hall, giving many first performances of double-bass repertoire, including Quintet for Clarinet, Bass Clarinet and String Trio (Simpson)(1981) by the composer Robert Simpson. Film music by the London Double Bass Ensemble includes Carl Davis's Home Sweet Home, a score for a Play for Today first screened on BBC television 16 March 1982. Albums include the LP Music Interludes

Founded by Gerald Drucker, the then Principal Double Bass at the Philharmonia Orchestra, along with the double bassists Ian Hall, Robin McGee and Neil Tarlton.
