= Symphony No. 5 (Simpson) =

The Symphony No. 5 by Robert Simpson was written in 1972 and "dedicated in admiration" to the London Symphony Orchestra, who gave the premiere on May 3, 1973, conducted by Andrew Davis. The second performance in England did not take place until 1984.

The orchestra used is of a similar size to Symphony No. 4.

== Structure ==
The symphony has five movements:

1. Allegro -
2. Canone 1: Tranquillo -
3. Scherzino -
4. Canone 2: Largo -
5. Allegro con molto fuoco

The work's shape is broadly symmetrical: two raucous, violent allegro parts enclose two slow "canone" parts which in turn enclose a central scherzino.

== Composition ==
The work is dominated by a six-note chord, spread out over five octaves. It contains five of the six-notes that make up an octave of the whole-tone scale, with the note C repeated high in the strings at the top. The missing note, B♭, becomes the focus of a tonal tug of war that begins later on in the symphony against the key of C, which is the tonal flavour of what may be referred to as The Chord. It begins the symphony, seemingly motionless and set at a barely audible ppp in the strings.

The deserted musical landscape of the opening remains disturbed only by distant timpani rolls and faint glimmers of light from the woodwinds. Without warning, the first section Allegro bursts on to the scene at fff – thundering timpani, biting rhythms from the trumpets and piccolos and rushing semiquavers in the strings in the background as the trombones announce a theme, characterised by an upward movement and, at its height, a downward slur of a semitone followed by repeated notes a major third lower. This theme acts as the first subject of a telegraphically argued sonata form, but will also make a reappearance in the final section, although in a new form. This leads to a dramatic appearance of another thematic element, beginning with a twice repeated downward hammering of a minor third which shares a close similarity with the first theme. Immediately following the announcement of this second thematic element which will reappear at various stages later on in the part is the second subject – the only part of the movement offering any respite at all and played in an oboe solo. It is an elaboration of elements of the first subject, but will not appear again. The development section follows, and the music becomes increasingly tense, building up to a devastating climax which consists of a dramatic restatement of the second thematic element in the first subject. Following this sort of climax is an angry and intense fugato, gradually building up to a varied recapitulation of the opening storm before being dramatically cut off at the point where the second subject would reappear – here The Chord is revealed, in exactly the same sound that opened the symphony, ppp in the strings. The rest of the orchestra attempts to stir the music back into motion, but The Chord quietly persists, unperturbed. This sets the scene for the second section, the first Canone.

Undoubtedly the most tranquil of the five sections, the first Canone begins with a piccolo theme, acting as the first canonic entry, on the topmost note of The Chord, C. Subsequent canonic entries begin on the next note down on The Chord – on clarinet, oboe, bassoon, bass clarinet and cellos and basses respectively. By this series of canonic entries, The Chord has gradually been dismantled, and the atmosphere is not unlike that of birds, breaking the silence of night at the glimmers of dawn.

The Canone is interrupted by the opening of the short, central Scherzino, in which four elements dominate: a side drum rhythm, an acciaccatura flick, an upward moving two voice which drops downwards at its peak, and a sliding-down thematic fragment in the bass. This section describes an arch structurally, climbing to an aggressive climax. At this point the key of B♭ puts forward its challenge, setting forth the work’s tonal conflict, but the key shifts to C as quickly as the climax retreats, and C paves its way for the second Canone.

Unlike in the first Canone, the mood of the second Canone is directly disturbed and foreboding, as though pre-empting a catastrophe. In the first Canone, The Chord was dismantled but here the reverse will occur – The Chord will be rebuilt, starting on C, the lowest note, and gradually going upwards. Each entry consists of a long, arch-like melody. As each entry occurs, the central note of the previous entry becomes the basis of a bizarre, tapping ostinato underneath it, meaning that the note of the ostinato is a step on the chord behind the central note of the corresponding entry. By the end of this Canone, the chord has been rebuilt, ticking away on pizzicato strings and woodwinds as though imitative of a time-bomb, threatening to explode. Suddenly some of the brass and remaining woodwind enter with The Chord a minor third higher, and now no fewer than ten of the twelve semitones of the chromatic scale are being sounded at once. As the tension and volume increases to near unbearable level, the trumpets and trombones together sound the two remaining notes, B♭ and D♭, which lead into the final section of the work, the finale, beginning with these two notes sounding and thundering timpani.

The last and longest section is arguably the most violent music Simpson ever wrote, its nearly constantly loud dynamic being complemented by its volcanic and obstreperous character. Brass and percussion interject powerful ostinatos, which are built up quietly in the strings. After multiple explosive episodes, the six-note chord recurs in the strings; following a final series of outbursts from the rest of the orchestra, the symphony closes as it opened with the six-note chord held motionlessly.

== Discography ==
A recording of the premiere is available from Lyrita Records. Another commercially available CD is a Hyperion Records release which also includes Symphony No. 3, both performed by the Royal Philharmonic Orchestra conducted by Vernon Handley.
