= Symphony No. 6 (Simpson) =

The Symphony No. 6 by Robert Simpson was completed in 1977 and dedicated to the renowned gynaecologist Ian Craft. It was commissioned by the London Philharmonic Orchestra who gave the premiere under Sir Charles Groves in a performance broadcast 8 April 1980.

Ian Craft, the symphony dedicatee, suggested that the emergence of life from a fertilized cell could be paralleled in symphonic form, with motives developing by thematic metamorphosis. This idea appealed to Simpson who took it even further by dividing the one-movement work into two parts: the first a steady build up to a large climax which symbolises birth, the second representing the rapid growth of the newborn individual.

At the beginning, two germinal elements are exposed; static and mobile. These include triadic shapes in the violins, and a chord which has potential to open out into a chain of fifths which Simpson likened to a DNA molecule. The material is always growing and proliferating into polyphonic lines, canons, inversions and retrogrades which representing cells dividing, multiplying and grouping. Eventually a central climax is reached after graphical ‘contractions’ from the orchestra; this represents the moment of birth and brings about a sense of release.

The second half of the work symbolises the rapid development of the newborn and suggests the sequence of an intermezzo, scherzo and finale. After a long oboe melody, there is a quiet fugue before a triumphant and energetic conclusion. The work ends triadically (an unusual occurrence in Simpson’s music) on a resounding D major chord.

== Discography ==
Currently, the only commercially available CD is a Hyperion Records release which also includes Symphony No. 7, both performed by the Royal Liverpool Philharmonic Orchestra conducted by Vernon Handley.
