= Symphony No. 11 (Simpson) =

Robert Simpson composed his Symphony No. 11 in 1990, dedicating the work to the conductor and composer Matthew Taylor, who was scheduled to give the premiere at Cheltenham Town Hall with the City of London Sinfonia on 15 July 1991. However, this event never took place, and the actual premiere was given at the Malvern Festival in 1992, by the same performers.

== Form ==
The symphony is approximately 28 minutes in length and is divided into two movements of approximately equal length:

1. Andante
2. Allegro vivace

The symphony opens with a lyrical line given out by the first violins, which rises up from the note D before descending through widely-leaping intervals. The musical material for the entire symphony grows out of this line. Passages of quietly intense string writing alternate with moments of reflection, where there is often only two or three lines moving at any one time. There is much lyrical writing for divided cellos in the middle of the movement, before a tightening of note values that gives the illusion of an increase in tempo. The movement gradually accelerates in this way, eventually climaxing on the note C from the entire orchestra before fading out into a quiet coda, which ends mysteriously and unresolved.

The second movement begins softly with quiet colouristic effects that seem to bubble from the texture: brooding sustained brass resonances and flickering woodwind and string pizzicati. Eventually the music becomes louder and more intense, with a great sense of Beethovenian dynamic energy. After a primary climax, the middle of the movement is dominated by mysterious threads of contrapuntal lines that gradually increase in dynamic. The climax of the work is built up, where gestures from the first movement are returned, now having undergone a different experience. This climax fades out on a timpani roll, which leaves a short, witty coda where fragments of the music are broken up and disappear into thin air.

== Instrumentation ==
The work is scored for a chamber orchestra: two flutes, two oboes, two clarinets, two bassoons, four horns, two trumpets, timpani, and strings.

== Discography ==
Currently, the only commercially available CD is a Hyperion Records performed by the City of London Sinfonia conducted by Matthew Taylor. The work is coupled with a performance of Simpson's Variations on a Theme of Carl Nielsen for Orchestra.
