= Symphony No. 9 (Arnold) =

Symphony by Malcolm Arnold

The Symphony No. 9, Op. 128 by Malcolm Arnold was finished in 1986. The symphony is dedicated to Anthony Day, who looked after Malcolm Arnold from 1984 to 2006.

It was first performed in 1988 in a private run-through by the now defunct Orchestra of the National Centre for Orchestral Studies conducted by Charles Groves in Greenwich. The first professional and public performance was given on Monday 20 January 1992 by the BBC Philharmonic Orchestra in Manchester also conducted by Charles Groves.

It is in four movements:

1. Vivace
2. Allegretto
3. Giubiloso
4. Lento

The last movement is as long as the previous three together, uses a theme similar to the last movement of Mahler's Ninth Symphony, and is very sparsely scored and bleak.

The symphony is scored for two flutes, piccolo, two oboes, two clarinets, two bassoons, four horns, three trumpets, three trombones, tuba, timpani, two percussionists, harp and strings.

== Commercial recordings ==
- 1996 Andrew Penny and the RTÉ National Symphony Orchestra on Naxos Records 8.553540 (recorded 11–12 September 1995, in the presence of the composer)
- 1996 Vernon Handley and the Bournemouth Symphony Orchestra on Conifer Records 75605-51273-2
- 2001 Rumon Gamba and the BBC Philharmonic Orchestra on Chandos Records CHAN 9967
- 2021 John Gibbons and the Liepāja Symphony Orchestra on Toccata Classics TOCC0613
