= Symphony No. 77 (Haydn) =

Symphony in four movements by Joseph Haydn

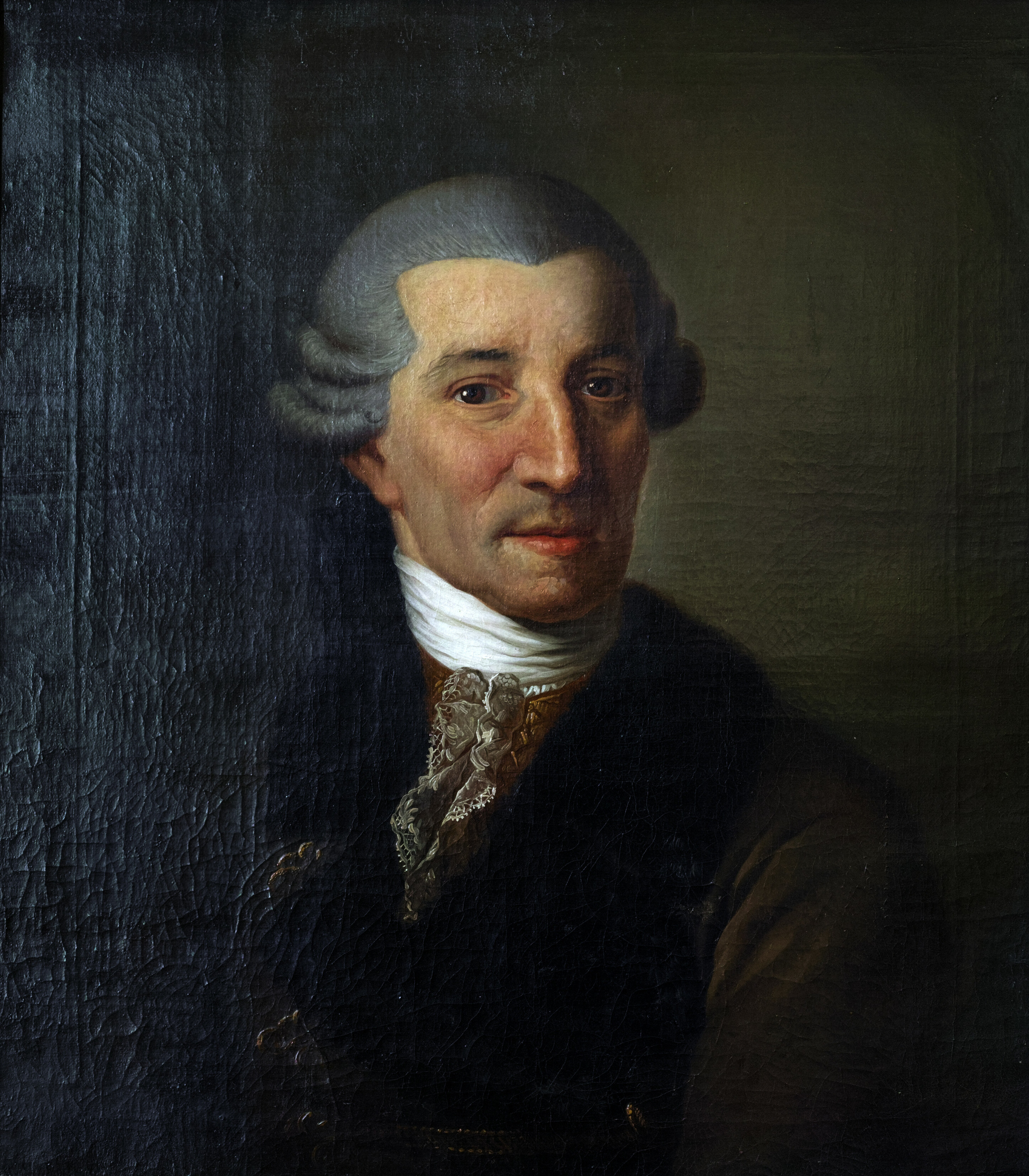
Portrait of Joseph Haydn by Christian Ludwig Seehas, 1785

Symphony No. 77 in B♭ major, Hoboken I/77, is a symphony by Joseph Haydn completed in 1782.

== Early set of symphonies for London ==
In 1782, almost a decade before Haydn composed the first of his famous London symphonies, he composed a trio of symphonies – 76, 77 and 78 – for a trip to London which fell through. Haydn wrote the following to his Paris music publisher Boyer on 15 July 1783:

Last year I composed 3 beautiful, magnificent and by no means over-lengthy Symphonies, scored for 2 violins, viola, basso, 2 horns, 2 oboes, 1 flute and 1 bassoon – but they are all very easy, and without too much concertante – for the English gentlemen, and I intended to bring them over myself and produce them there: but a certain circumstance hindered that plan, and so I am willing to hand over these 3 Symphonies.

Boyer wanted exclusive rights, but Haydn refused.

It is not known how much Haydn knew of the tastes of English audiences, but the three symphonies do possess a polish and style typical of London composers such as Johann Christian Bach and Carl Friedrich Abel. As noted in the letter, the winds have very few measures where they do not support the strings, they are used primarily to add colour.

== Music ==
The symphony is scored for flute, two oboes, two bassoons, two horns and strings.

There are four movements:

1. Vivace, 2/2
2. Andante sostenuto, 3/8
3. Menuetto & Trio: Allegro, 3/4
4. Finale: Allegro spiritoso, 2/4
