= Symphony No. 8 (Simpson) =

Symphony by Robert Simpson

The Symphony No. 8 by Robert Simpson was completed in 1981 and commissioned by the Royal Philharmonic Society. The first performance was given at the Royal Festival Hall on 10 November 1982 by the Royal Danish Orchestra conducted by Jerzy Semkow. The work employs a large orchestra which includes two sets of timpani. It one of Simpson’s largest, richest and most complex scores.

Prior to composing this work, Simpson had in mind to write a symphony for one particular listener and decided asked a close friend, painter Anthony Dorrell, to describe the kind of symphony he would like to hear. The resulting work was this large-scale four-movement symphony in two halves, each half containing two movements that are played without a break in between each other.

The first movement, titled Poco animato, begins with a relatively peaceful, quiet introduction that slowly develops and becomes increasingly agitated throughout the remainder of the movement. It is full of violent, stark and almost feral brass outbursts in the midst of suppressed violence. Just as the first movement reaches its climactic point, it collapses into the second movement, a threateningly sinister Scherzo that gradually builds up to a terrifying, volcanic climax which eventually declines into the depths of the orchestra.

After a break, the third movement begins the second half of the work with a passionate Adagio. It opens with a slow fugue, and as the movement progresses the aim of calm and serenity following the horrific first part comes closer to vision. This movement gives way to a vigorous finale, full of the energy that is typical of a Simpson finale. The main subject is derived from the fugue from the third movement, gradually developing to give a sense of harmonic fluidity. The work ends decisively with a biting cadence.

== Discography ==
Currently, the only commercially available CD is a Hyperion Records release which also includes Symphony No. 1, both performed by the Royal Philharmonic Orchestra conducted by Vernon Handley.
