= Symphony No. 2 (Simpson) =

The Symphony No. 2 by Robert Simpson was completed in 1956 and dedicated to Anthony Bernard, conductor of the London Chamber Orchestra, though the first performance was in fact given by the Hallé Orchestra conducted by Sir John Barbirolli on 16 July 1957 at the Cheltenham Festival.

This is one of Simpson's most accessible works. He used similar orchestration to that used by Ludwig van Beethoven in his early symphonies, with the exception of high D trumpets being used instead of the standard B♭ trumpets.

The work is in three movements:

1. Allegro grazioso
2. Largo cantabile
3. Non troppo allegro, ma con brio

The first movement opens with mysterious muted string lines in simple triple time which gracefully develops in a similar way to classical form. The tonal conflict in this Symphony centers on B and the tonalities a major third above and below it (G and E♭).

The second movement is remarkable in that it is a palindrome (the same backwards as forwards) if one removes the last few bars. In all, there are thirteen variations on the viola theme which opens the movement, and many of the motives within the movement are palindromic to ensure formal cohesion.

The finale makes an ironic end to the symphony, with its themes and brass/timpani interjections creating a sort of Beethovenian hilarity. Even so, this movement has its fair share of dissonance which is always a distinctive feature in Simpson's writing.

== Discography ==
Currently, the only commercially available CD is a Hyperion Records release which also includes Symphony No. 4, both performed by the Bournemouth Symphony Orchestra conducted by Vernon Handley.
