= Symphony No. 1 (Simpson) =

Symphony by Robert Simpson

The Symphony No. 1 by Robert Simpson was completed in 1951 and submitted as his doctorate thesis for the University of Durham. Simpson was only 30 years old at the time of submission.

It is scored with a fairly standard orchestra with the exception that high D trumpets are used instead of the standard B♭ or C trumpets.

The work is in three connected movements, all in one basic pulse so that tempo changes are all proportionally related. The work pits the tonalities of A and E♭ against each other. It begins with a fanfare-like introduction from the brass and which then resides for several moments into a quieter section dominated by the strings which develops the main motives.

The second part is half the basic pulse of the opening and is almost completely diatonic, dominated mostly by strings and introducing a theme which was metamorphosed from the opening section. It is very peaceful, and evokes timeless purity in which its restrained melancholy conveys a meditative atmosphere.

Both themes of the opening are combined to form a Part 3 which acts like a finale. The piece ends triumphantly in A major.

"The impression created is of a monolithic unity as though conceived in a single breath."

The premiere was played by the Danish State Radio Orchestra under Launy Grøndahl in Copenhagen on 11 June 1953 and it was recorded by HMV under the auspices of the British Council in 1956, with the London Philharmonic Orchestra conducted by Sir Adrian Boult. The symphony is dedicated to Boult.

== Discography ==
There are two commercially available CDs: one is a Hyperion Records release which also includes Symphony No. 8, both performed by the Royal Philharmonic Orchestra conducted by Vernon Handley, the other is a remastering of Boult's HMV LP of 1956, which also includes Racine Fricker's Symphony No. 2 and Robin Orr's Symphony in One Movement.
