= Symphony No. 7 (Simpson) =

1977 composition by Robert Simpson

Robert Simpson composed his Seventh Symphony in 1977, the same year he completed his Sixth Symphony. Composition was begun 26 September and concluded 23 October in Chearsley. The work is dedicated to Hans Keller and his wife, Milein Keller, and was first performed by the Royal Liverpool Philharmonic Orchestra, conducted by Brian Wright at the Philharmonic Hall, Liverpool on 30 October 1984. It is a one-movement work of approximately 28 minutes duration, and since its first performance it has become one of Simpson's most frequently heard symphonies.

== Structure ==
The work is structured in one continuous movement, albeit in three distinct sections. The first of these takes up over half the symphony in duration and begins ‘Sostenuto, marcato’, gradually quickening in tempo until a fugato marked ‘Intensivo’ is reached. The second section is a tranquil adagio, which gives way to the third and final part: a tempestuous Allegro finale.

== Instrumentation ==
Simpson scored his Seventh Symphony for a chamber-sized orchestra of two flutes, two oboes, two clarinets, two bassoons, two horns, two trumpets, timpani and strings. However, because of the forcible wind and timpani writing, a greater weight of strings is needed.

== Composition ==
Throughout the work the composer explores resonances inherent in a ‘cluster’ harmony which is introduced in horizontal form at the very outset of the work – a very dramatic opening from the bassoons, cellos and double basses, characterised by a heavy, accented dotted rhythm and the upward leap of a fifth and descent by a sixth. The notes of this theme, if spaced out in a single octave, contained every semitone from A up to D. The top three notes (C, C sharp, and D) are of great importance to the work, and each dominates in turn – C at the beginning, D in the middle, and C sharp at the end. The cluster is unravelled and explored in various ways, and a characteristic sonority results: spaced out over several octaves through the orchestra, a major third glitters over the top of a dissonant cluster. The careful scoring and conflicting registers of the sonority presented near the opening including a major third high in the winds (B flat-D) which holds within its span a whole tone (B natural-C sharp) presented low in the basses and cellos. Central to both these elements is the note C, which is scored in the middle range between these two extreme registers of the orchestra, giving the note a magnetic quality. Throughout the work, the cluster moves to a variety of pitches, always with its central note having a magnetic quality. The opening fifth leap of the work is productive in many ways. One of these ways is to cause doublings at the fifth of various harmonies and even melodic lines.

After the initial dramatic opening, marked ‘Sostenuto, marcato’, swells of unusual sonorities derived from the characteristic harmony outlined above are presented, the music fades out to reveal the note G, sustained in the strings and clarinets in the same octave over a gradual diminuendo. This is an allusion to the ending of the work, discussed below. This gives way to a section of calm, ethereal string writing against a quietly sustained woodwind background, marked ‘Meno Mosso’, which introduces the more lyrical material, based on the flow of thirds, foreshadowing the tranquillity of the central Adagio. A cyclical rhythm figure is presented in the cellos and basses, based on the notes G, F#, E which are formed into a repeating pattern. The calm atmosphere is short-lived however, and dissonances begin to be piled up as the dynamic increases. A huge dissonant cluster chord miraculously resolves into an ethereal D major chord from the strings. This is the first sign that the note D will supplant C in the tonal battle. The calmness temporarily returns, and a brief trumpet chorale passage is sounded, also an idea to be presented again later.

A large crescendo is built up and the music quickly gains intensity, culminating at the beginning of a section marked ‘Piu mosso’. The music proceeds with considerable violence for several minutes in this passage where the conflict is presented in a most dramatic manner. A fury of violin demisemiquavers, sharp dotted rhythms in the basses and violent interjections from the trumpets and timpani propel the music dissonantly through an increasingly complex texture until the tempo marking doubles to ‘Allegro’. A climax is reached where a dissonant cluster chord (containing the notes reading upwards, spread over several octaves from the entire orchestra: C natural, D, E, C#, E sharp) is sounded. At length, the dynamic suddenly softens to pianissimo and a new mood is created, where small motivic fragments are quietly passed between instruments in the orchestra above low string pizzicato – the effect is of mysterious, pulsating energy (the tempo remains Allegro). Intensity and urgency is gradually built up again, though the dynamic feels suppressed. A crescendo is built up until a new passage of energy is released, where a fast motive based on the note D is obsessively repeated, initially in the first violins and later passed to the woodwinds, above a dramatic tremolo from the violas and cellos. The woodwinds and brass play harmonic fragments, often juxtaposing major thirds in a high register above the darkly dissonant harmonic texture.

All this energy culminates in a huge fugato (based on material already present), marked ‘Intensivo’, which breaks away from the harmonic field. The texture is now more contrapuntal and polyphonic, and a fortissimo dynamic is maintained for several minutes, after reaching a final crushing dissonance, the music fades away to a single mysterious line doubled in the cellos and basses, which acts a transition into Part Two of the symphony, a central Adagio.

The Adagio is the central heart of the whole work, and acts as reflective contemplation in the midst of violence and unrest. After a sonority presented in pianissimo in the woodwinds and cellos, the first and second violins enter, marked ppp in the high register. The effect is like that of the sun breaking through the midst – the midst here being the softly sustained tranquil dissonance in the background and the sun represented by the tender violin line. After some moments a lyrical trumpet chorale, marked ‘tranquillo’, enters above the texture. The violin line is taken up by the horns and the repeating cyclic figure from the Meno mosso in part 1 enters the texture. Tension is built up briefly, but fades out to reveal the most deeply contemplative music in the entire work – sustained sounds in the background as the strings pass lyrical fragments between one another. The music moves virtually unnoticed into the final part of the work, an Allegro.

The Allegro begins very softly, with the cellos and basses attempting to consolidate the note C, but being conflicted by a sustained C# and D in the trumpets. A growing sense of expectancy is built up as violent interjections from the woodwind become more frequent and the dynamic gradually increases, culminating in a huge dissonance which sets off the mood for the remainder of the finale. The music proceeds with considerable violence, with relentlessly clashing dissonances in the woodwind and a plethora of racing string semiquavers. After a storm has been built up, a ritardando leads into the final, crushing dissonance of the work, where all three notes (C, C# and D) are dominant. The dissonance is cut off to reveal the note C#, which from then on to the end is sustained at a moderate dynamic, never moving. Small fragments of the storm are blow around but gradually disappear into the atmosphere of overwhelming gloom presented in the note C#, sustained in the mid range strings for several minutes. The effect of this eventual ending is baleful and profoundly cold.

== Discography ==
Currently, the only commercially available CD is a Hyperion Records release which also includes Symphony No. 6, both performed by the Royal Liverpool Philharmonic Orchestra conducted by Vernon Handley.
