= Symphony No. 9 (Simpson) =

The Symphony No. 9 by Robert Simpson was composed between 1985 and 1987 and commissioned by the Bournemouth Symphony Orchestra who gave the premiere under Vernon Handley at the Poole Arts Centre on 8 April 1987. The work was dedicated to his second wife, Angela. It has been called ‘the largest piece of music written in one tempo’ and, more than any other Simpson symphony, met with immediate critical acclaim. Some music critics and admirers of Simpson’s music consider this symphony to be his finest.

The work is in one, vast movement in a three-part form; a chorale-prelude style opening section which goes headlong into a giant scherzo before a slow, fugal third part which is followed by a theme and variations. The scherzo second part is often treated as an extended climax of the symphony, meaning that the structure of the whole work could be seen to be in two halves, each divided into two sections.

(first statement of chorale in opening span).

The symphony opens with a set of variations on a theme that is constructed of a succession of intervals that form an irregular wedge-shape. In fanning out, the wedge shape moves up or down by a fourth, an interval which becomes important to the construction of the symphony throughout. This section then turns into a chorale-style prelude, an allusion to a musical procedure used by JS Bach. The chorale is the wedge shape, with each entry of the chorale being a fourth higher than the previous one, decorated by a contrapuntal theme that also derives from the wedge.

The first section then goes headlong into a giant, Beethovenian scherzo that has a genuine sense of propelled, forward motion; a rare occurrence in modern music. The scherzo eventually climaxes before fading away, but not before first quoting from letter F of the first movement of Bruckner's Third Symphony (Simpson says so in a taped talk about the piece).

Following the scherzo is a grand, slow third part which is roughly the length of the rest of the symphony. It opens with a slow fugue, but now the wedge shape is reversed so that the intervals narrow. This mysterious fugue is interrupted three times by a very sinister palindromic subject, again built out of the wedge shape. This palindromic subject is then used to form a basis for the variations that follow. These variations gradually build up in intensity to an enormous climax, which suddenly subsides to leave the note D♯ (which is used as a centre point rather than the tonality of the symphony) hanging in the air. Following this is a calm, peaceful coda in which the wedge shape is transformed into rising scales which give one the feeling of gazing into the infinite distances of space.

== Discography ==
Currently, the only commercially available CD is a Hyperion Records performed by the Bournemouth Symphony Orchestra conducted by Vernon Handley. The disc includes a 20-minute talk by Simpson about the symphony illustrated with excerpts from Handley's recording.
