= Symphony No. 3 (Simpson) =

The Symphony No. 3 by Robert Simpson was written in 1962 and dedicated to veteran composer Havergal Brian. The premiere was given by the City of Birmingham Symphony Orchestra on 14 March 1963 under the conductor Hugo Rignold. Its BBC Proms premiere was given by the Royal Philharmonic Orchestra on 21 August 1967 under the conductor Charles Groves. The US premiere was given by the Oklahoma City Symphony Orchestra on 8 December 1974 under its then music director, Ainslee Cox.

The orchestration is fairly standard, except Simpson required all three flutes to double on piccolos.

The work lasts about 31 minutes in performance (both recorded performances time in at a few seconds under that figure) and is in two movements:

1. Allegro ma non troppo
2. Adagio - Presto

In two movements, this Symphony conflicts C major and B♭. The first movement is a dissonant, craggy sonata-allegro in B♭ which strays into the orbit of C. The model of this movement has some parallels with the first movement of Symphony No. 9 by Ludwig van Beethoven, but it is still highly individual.

Simpson described the second movement as 'a huge composed accelerando, but with the dynamics repressed'. It is really a slow movement and finale, and the tempo is always increasing. The movement takes a good while to climax. There is a sort of scherzo section in the middle, and the music is always developing, with motives evolving and increasing in familiarity. The movement eventually climaxes, and at this point a great fortissimo blaze on the dominant seventh of C major is played from the orchestra. The climax subsides to a quiet close in C major (the key which eventually prevailed), although B♭ can still be heard.

== Discography ==
The symphony was first recorded on 5 June 1970 by the London Symphony Orchestra conducted by Jascha Horenstein for the Unicorn (later Unicorn-Kanchana) label and was issued on LP in September 1970. It was reissued on CD, coupled with Simpson's Clarinet Quintet, in the 'Unicorn-Kanchana Souvenir Series' in June 1990. The recording was released again on the NMC label in 2006.

A Hyperion Records release which also includes Symphony No. 5, both performed by the Royal Philharmonic Orchestra conducted by Vernon Handley, was recorded on 24 May 1994 and released later that year; in 2006 it was re-released as part of a Hyperion boxed set of Simpson's complete symphonies.

A pirated recording of Jascha Horenstein rehearsing this Symphony with the Royal Philharmonic Orchestra on 5 May 1966 was issued on CD in 1992 by the Italian record company Intaglio, coupled with a performance of Anton Bruckner's Symphony No. 8.
