= Leger des Heils =

Dutch arm of the Salvation Army

The Leger des Heils is the name of the Dutch arm of The Salvation Army.

The Leger des Heils was largely established by a Dutch teacher, Gerrit Govaars, who together with the English officers Captain and Mrs Joseph K. Tyler, commenced Army work in the Gerard Doustraat, Amsterdam, on 8 May 1887.

The organisation spread rapidly through Holland and into the various Dutch-speaking territories. Operations soon spread throughout the country and reached the 'Dutch East Indies' (present day Indonesia) in 1894. Further advances were made in 1926 in Surinam and in 1927 in Curaçao.

== Gerrit Govaars ==
Gerrit Jurriaan Govaars (19 April 1866 in Amsterdam – 22 October 1954 in Soest) was a Dutch teacher who was instrumental in setting up Leger des Heils.

Govaars (as 'Lieutenant Gerrit J. Govaars'), together with the English officer Major J. F. Tyler, commenced Army work in the Gerard Doustraat, Amsterdam, on 8 May 1887. Operations soon spread throughout the country and reached Indonesia (then the 'Dutch East Indies') in 1894. Further advances were made in 1926 in Surinam and in 1927 in Curaçao.

As 'Colonel Gerrit J. Govaars', he was a recipient of the Salvation Army's 'Order Of The Founder' in 1947. Govaars composed a number of hymns that the 'Leger des Heils' employed in their activities. His grandson Robert Simpson was a noted English composer.
