= String Quartet No. 8 (Simpson) =

The String Quartet No. 8 by Robert Simpson was composed in 1979 in response to a commission by the Brunel Philharmonic Society with funds made available from the Greater London Arts Association. The work is dedicated to Professor Gillett, who was the director of Biological Sciences at Brunel University in 1980, and his wife. The Quartet was first performed on 21 June 1980 by the Delme String Quartet at Brunel University.

== Movements ==
The work is composed of four movements:

1. Grave, molto intensivo
2. Molto vivace (Eretmapodites gilletti)
3. Allegretto grazioso
4. Risoluto e concentrato

== Overview ==
The quartet opens with an austere melody from the first violin which comprises the main subject of the predominantly fugal first movement. In turn, the melody is taken up by all four instruments and then developed by metamorphosis throughout the rest of the movement. This subject also forms an integral part of the rest of the quartet. The interval of a perfect fifth in particular plays a vital role of the concentrated construction of the entire work. The intensity of the fugue is mitigated at times by more reflective material. As the fugue develops, power and energy is gained until a climax is reached with scurrying motion of the viola and cello. Hereafter the music becomes calmer and the movement ends peacefully.

The second movement is a very short scherzo, illustrating a mosquito (hence the title of the movement, Eretmapodites gilletti, a species discovered by and named after the work’s dedicatee). This scherzo is in A-B-A form.

The third movement too is muted strings and consisting entirely of elusive half-shades. It is cast in a very small-scale sonata form, and the dynamic seldom rises from a soft pp (a musical term meaning "very soft").

The tumultuous and intense finale balances out the extended opening movement. It is the same length as the opening movement, but the texture is not fugal. Pungency rather than speed creates the intensity, and throughout there is a very deliberate quality to the writing which quite unique. Unlike the first movement where the calmer, reserved music prevailed, in the finale the concentrated energy prevails, with scales of all kinds evolving from the texture as the movement closes vigorously.

A typical performance of this work lasts approximately 30 minutes.

== Discography ==
Currently, the only commercially available CD is a Hyperion Records release which also includes String Quartet No. 7, both performed by the Delme Quartet.

== See also ==
- List of compositions by Robert Simpson
- String quartet
- Composer
