= 1782 in music =

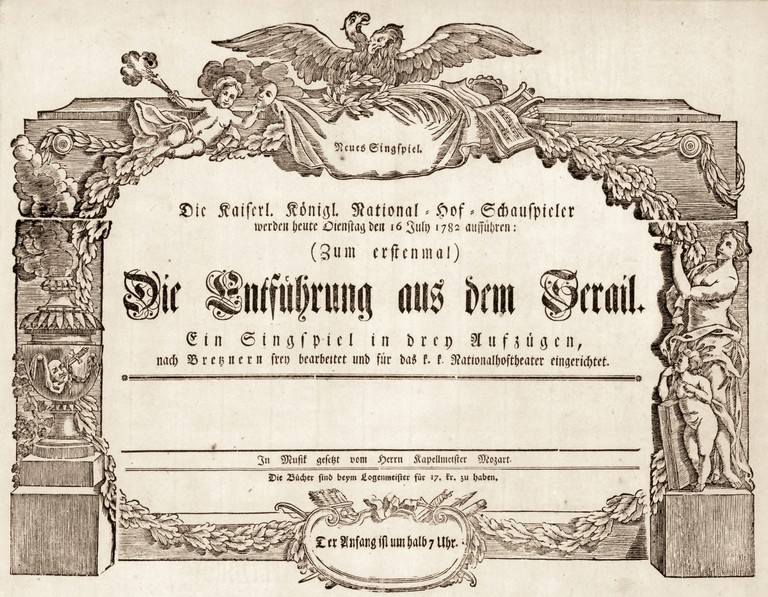
The theater program for the premiere of the singing play “Die Entführung aus dem Serail” by Mozart, commissioned by Emperor Joseph II, was presented at the Burgtheater in Vienna on July 16, 1782.

== Events ==
- March 17 – Violinist Giovanni Battista Viotti makes his début at the Concert Spirituel in Paris.
- August 4 – Wolfgang Amadeus Mozart marries Constanze Weber in Vienna.
- September 30 – The Royal Swedish Opera in Stockholm is inaugurated with a performance of Johann Gottlieb Naumann's Cora och Alonzo.
- William Shield is appointed resident composer to Covent Garden.
- Antoine Bournonville and his sister Julie Alix de la Fay join the Royal Swedish Ballet at Stockholm.

== Published popular music ==
- James Aird (compiled and edited) – A Selection of Scotch, English, Irish and Foreign Airs (including "The Miners of Wicklow", possibly the first published version of "Yankee Doodle")
- Robert Burns – John Barleycorn (original version from 16th century)

== Classical music ==
- Ludwig van Beethoven
  - 9 Variations on a March by Dressler, WoO 63
  - Schilderung eines Mädchen, WoO 107
- Friedrich Wilhelm Heinrich Benda – 3 Flute Concertos, Op. 4
- Luigi Boccherini
  - Symphony in D major, Op. 35 no 1/G 509
  - Symphony in E-flat major, Op 35 no 2/G 510
  - Symphony in A major, Op. 35 no 3/G 511
  - Symphony in F major, Op. 35 no 4/G 512
  - Symphony in E-flat major, Op. 35 no 5/G 513
- Giuseppe Maria Cambini – Seconde et nouvelle suite de simphonies concertantes à plusieurs instruments
- Muzio Clementi
  - 3 Piano Sonatas, Op. 7
  - 3 Piano Sonatas, Op. 8
- François Joseph Gossec – Hymne à la Liberté, RH 628
- Joseph Haydn
  - Symphony No. 73 in D "La chasse"
  - Symphony No. 77 in B-flat major, Hob.I:77
  - Symphony No.78 in C minor, Hob.I:78
  - Divertimento in B-flat major, Hob.II:46 (authorship is disputed)
  - Keyboard Concerto in G major, Hob.XVIII:4
  - Keyboard Concerto in D major, Hob.XVIII:11
  - Mass in C major, Hob.XXII:8 "Mariazellermesse"
- Michael Haydn – Divertimento in D major, MH 319
- Wolfgang Amadeus Mozart
  - Symphony No. 35 in D "Haffner", K. 385
  - String Quartet in G, K. 387, No. 14
  - Fantasia in D minor, K.397/385g
  - Suite in C major, K.399/385i
  - Violin Sonata in C major, K.403/385c
  - Adagio in F major, K.410/484d
- Emanuel Johann Gottfried Pässler – Sechs Sonaten für das Klavier oder die Harfe
- Dieudonné-Pascal Pieltain – Violin Concerto No.3 in B-flat major
- Johann Friedrich Reichardt – Klavierstück über eine Petrarchische Ode
- Antonio Rosetti – 6 Symphonies, Op. 3
- Johann Abraham Peter Schulz – Lieder im Volkston
- Johannes Matthias Sperger – String Symphony in C
- Giovanni Battista Viotti
  - Concerto for Violin No. 2 in E major, G 44
  - Violin Concerto No.4 in D major
  - Violin Concerto No.5 in C major
- Ernst Wilhelm Wolf – Osterkantate

== Opera ==
- Giuseppe Maria Cambini – Alcide
- Domenico Cimarosa
  - L'amor costante
  - La ballerina amante
  - Circe
  - Il convito
  - L'eroe cinese
- François-Joseph Gossec – Thésée
- Joseph Haydn – Orlando paladino
- Wolfgang Amadeus Mozart – Die Entführung aus dem Serail, 16 July, Burgtheater in Vienna.
- Giovanni Paisiello – Il barbiere di Siviglia
- Giuseppe Sarti – Fra i due litiganti il terzo gode

== Methods and theory writings ==
- Anton Bemetzrieder – Abstract of a New Method of Teaching the Principles of Music
- Heinrich Philipp Bossler – Elementarbuch der Tonkunst zum Unterricht beim Klavier
- Michel Corrette – L’art de se perfectionner dans le violon
- Johann Kirnberger – Gedanken über die verschiedenen Lehrarten in der Komposition
- Louis-Toussaint Milandre – Méthode facile pour la viole d'amour, Op.5
- Johann Friedrich Reichardt – Musikalisches Kunstmagazin

== Births ==
- January 29 – Daniel Auber, composer (died 1871)
- April 14 – Carlo Coccia, composer (died 1873)
- May 1 – Christopher Meineke, composer, organist (died 1850)
- July 19 – Jonathan Blewitt, composer and son of Jonas Blewitt (died 1853)
- July 26 – John Field, pianist and composer (died 1837)
- September 23 – Jacques Féréol Mazas, composer and musician (died 1849)
- October 27 – Niccolò Paganini, composer, violinist (died 1840)
- December 21 – Benoit Tranquille Berbiguier, flautist (died 1835)

== Deaths ==
- January 1 – Johann Christian Bach, composer (b. 1735)
- April 12 – Metastasio, poet and lyricist (b. 1698)
- April 22 – Josef Ferdinand Norbert Seger, composer (b. 1716)
- May – Joseph Kelway, composer and organist (born c. 1702)
- May 6 – Herman Friedrich Voltmar, Danish composer (born 1707)
- June 17 – Kane O'Hara, Irish composer (b. 1711)
- July 15 – Robert Wainwright, composer
- August – Jean-Baptiste Forqueray, viol player and composer (b. 1699)
- August 6 – Nicolas Chédeville, composer (b. 1705)
- September 16 – Farinelli, castrato singer (b. 1702)
- October – John Parry, blind harpist (b. c. 1710)
- October 23 – Joseph Riepel, German composer (born 1709)
- December 28 – Maria Carolina of Savoy, composer and princess (born 1764)
- date unknown
  - Pedro António Avondano, Portuguese composer (b. 1714)
  - Jacob Raphael Saraval, writer and musician (b. c. 1707)
  - Giovannini, composer and violinist (birth year unknown)
