= Symphony No. 78 (Haydn) =

Symphony in four movements by Joseph Haydn

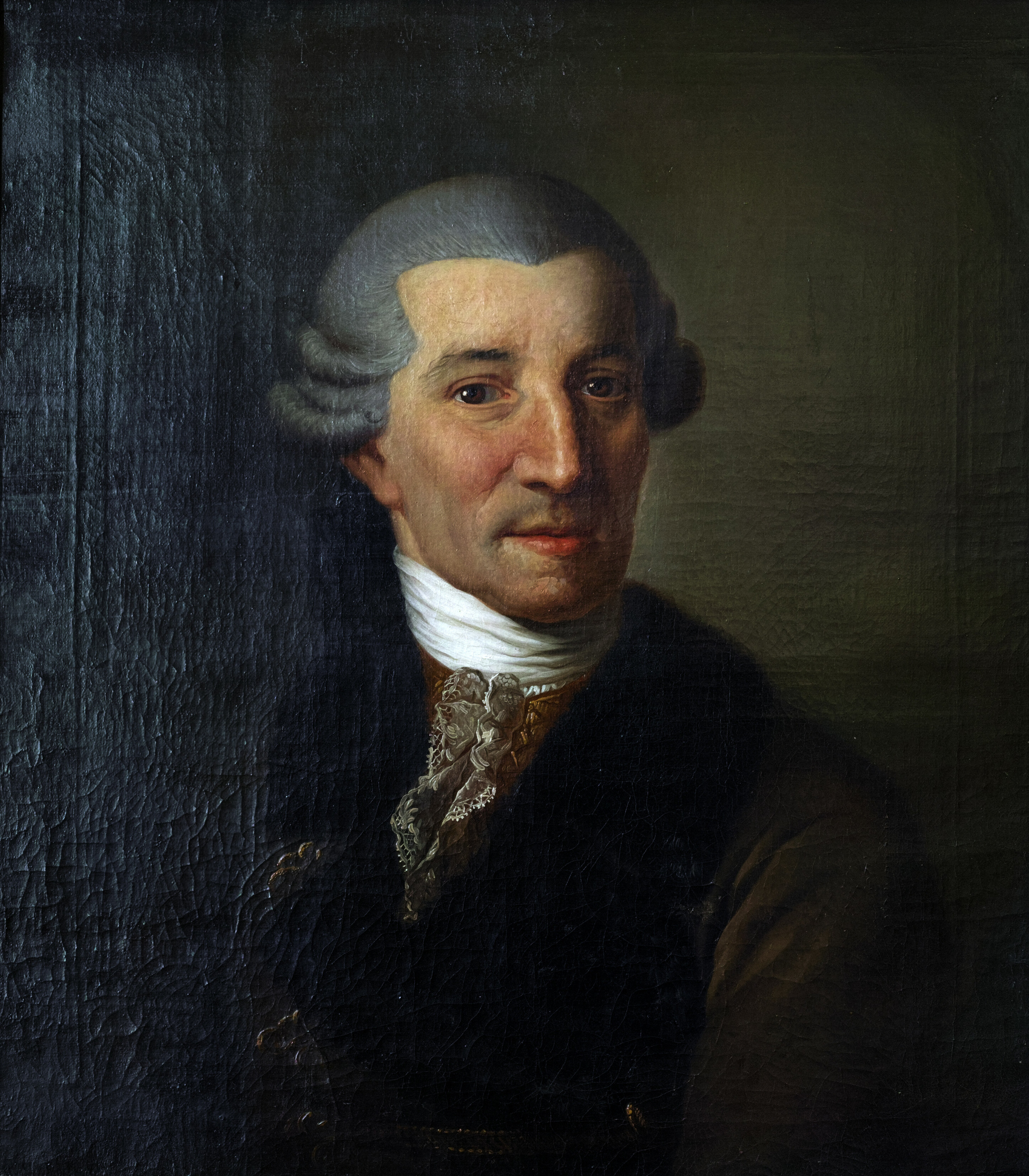
Portrait of Joseph Haydn by Christian Ludwig Seehas, 1785

The Symphony No. 78 in C minor, Hoboken 1/78, is a symphony by Joseph Haydn completed in 1782.

== Early set of symphonies for London ==
In 1782, almost a decade before Haydn composed the first of his famous London symphonies, he composed a trio of symphonies – 76, 77 and 78 – for a trip to London which fell through. Haydn wrote the following to his Paris music publisher Boyer on July 15, 1783:

Last year I composed 3 beautiful, magnificent and by no means over-lengthy Symphonies, scored for 2 violins, viola, basso, 2 horns, 2 oboes, 1 flute and 1 bassoon – but they are all very easy, and without too much concertante – for the English gentlemen, and I intended to bring them over myself and produce them there: but a certain circumstance hindered that plan, and so I am willing to hand over these 3 Symphonies.

It is not known how much Haydn knew of the tastes of English audiences, but the three symphonies do possess a polish and style typical of London composers such as Johann Christian Bach and Carl Friedrich Abel. As noted in the letter, the winds have very few measures where they do not support the strings: they are used primarily to add color.

== Music ==
The symphony is scored for flute, two oboes, two bassoons, two horns and strings.

The work is in four movements:

1. Vivace, 3/4
2. Adagio
3. Menuetto & Trio: Allegretto, 3/4
4. Finale: Presto, 2/4

The galant character that Haydn used for the previous two symphonies for London is still present in the inner two movements, but Sturm und Drang rules the outer two.

The first movement defines C minor in the first bar, but then destabilizes it with awkward leaps at odd intervals:

== Influence ==
This symphony may have served as one of the models for Mozart's Piano Concerto in C minor of 1786, which employs a variant of the opening statement of Haydn's symphony. However, this claim has been questioned, since Mozart already had a similar expression of minor seventh leaps in the Act III interlude from Thamos, King of Egypt, K. 345/336a, which predates this Haydn symphony in date of composition.
