= Flute Concerto (Simpson) =

1989 Concerto by Robert Simpson

The Flute Concerto by Robert Simpson was composed in 1989 and dedicated to Susan Milan, the flautist who commissioned the work and gave its premiere in May 1992 at the Malvern Festival with the City of London Sinfonia conducted by Richard Hickox.

== Form ==
The work is in one movement with a running time of approximately twenty-five minutes. The orchestra used by Simpson is a small one, with seven woodwind players, two horns, timpani and strings. The work can broadly be divided into three distinct parts:

=== Allegretto ===
In a 6/8 meter, the work begins with a phrase from muted first violins that forms the basis of the entire work. The shape given out by the sequence of intervals present in A - B - C♯ - D♯ - D - D♯ - B - C - D is developed throughout the entire one movement structure. The flute enters several bars later with a variation on this phrase with light accompaniment from the orchestra, often consisting of just a single line with the dynamic level remaining at pianissimo for a considerable period of time. After several minutes a climax is reached, leading into a brief secondary part of the Allegretto where the tempo remains the same but the meter is changed to common time. Gradually the music becomes more agitated before breaking away into the following section, Allegro non troppo.

=== Allegro non troppo ===
A one-in-a-bar scherzo, it begins softly with strings before the flute enters, accompanied by chamber-like subdued textures from the orchestra. The soloist has dialogue with both the woodwinds and the timpani during this section, giving the impression of dry wit. This section too climaxes near its end, before ending softly and mysteriously, leading into the final Adagio.

=== Adagio ===
The strings introduce the Adagio, its mood contemplative and introspective (reminiscent of some of the slow string writing in Simpson's Ninth Symphony and later string quartets). The flute and woodwinds take over this theme in turn. After a passage accompanied by divided cellos, the work reaches its final, extended climax as the flautist is instructed to sit with the string soloists for the very final part of the piece where the conductor is required to sit out. The last five minutes are essentially chamber music - the flute and string soloists forming a quintet, closing peacefully.
