= Giovannini (composer) =

Giovannini, sometimes given as de Giovannini, (fl. 1740 – c. 1782) was an Italian composer and violinist of the Classical period. His first name is unknown.

== Biography ==
By 1740, he was living in Berlin, Germany, where he worked during his known lifetime. His best-known work is his "Aria di Giovannini", which was included in a republication of the larger of Anna Magdalena Bach's music anthology books. These were originally published in 1725 and originally did not include Giovannini's piece. It was later added, most likely by C.P.E. Bach. Breitkopf & Härtel published eight of his violin sonatas in 1762. He died in 1782.
