= Quintet for clarinet, bass clarinet and string trio (Simpson) =

The Quintet for clarinet, bass clarinet and string trio by Robert Simpson was completed in 1981 and commissioned by Gerald Drucker principal double bass at the Philharmonia Orchestra of London. The first performance was given at the Wigmore Hall in 1981 by the London Double Bass Ensemble and led by Gerald Drucker.

Robert Simpson was attracted to the idea of a quintet for the somewhat unusual combination of three double basses, clarinet and bass clarinet, beginning with a passage where the bass trio is actually introduced in harmonics, so that the two clarinets enter below.

== Discography ==
Currently, the only commercially available CD is a Hyperion Records release. The Quintet is also recorded with the string quartets Nos. 14 and 15.
