= String Quartet No. 15 (Simpson) =

The String Quartet No. 15 by Robert Simpson was composed quickly in the summer of 1991 and dedicated to the Vanbrugh Quartet who had developed growing association with Simpson's later chamber music.

This work is cast in one continuous movement and is relatively short. The overall mood is tough and turbulent and, as with much of Simpson's later work, the chief roots are a collection of intervals - a minor seventh (both ascending and descending) and a sequence of falling minor seconds dominating. Another feature of this work is that most of the phrases proceed in contrary motion to another instrument (one voice moving up whilst the other moves down).

The opening Adagio acts as an austere and brief introduction, moments of extreme tension contrasting with gently flowing counterpoint, with minor sevenths being particularly prominent.

The opening goes headlong into the extended part of the work, a large scale Severo based on a variant of the quartet's opening theme. The intensity and severity is sustained for a considerable period of time until a hushed section emerges, building up to a harsh passage of sevenths piled on top of each other before subsiding to another buildup that gradually increases in volume. A climax is eventually reached, and a modified recapitulation of the opening of the Severo section is heard before it quickly dissipates into fragments, leaving a high C sustained on the first violin.

The final part of the work is a somewhat calmer but uneasy allegretto that is still based on the strict structure of the work. There is tenderness and delicacy here but the listener is briefly reminded of the Severo section once again before the work fades away into silence, unresolved.

A typical performance of this work lasts approximately 18 minutes.

== Discography ==
Currently, the only commercially available CD is a Hyperion Records release which also includes String Quartet No. 14 and the Quintet for Clarinet, Bass Clarinet and String Trio, all performed by the Vanbrugh Quartet with relevant additions for the two clarinet work.
