= Symphony No. 4 (Simpson) =

The Symphony No. 4 by Robert Simpson was written between 1970 and 1972 and commissioned by The Hallé who gave the premiere, conducted by James Loughran, at the Free Trade Hall, Manchester, on 6 April 1973.

The work was begun 3 October 1970, and composition was concluded 13 February 1972, with some revision of the cello part in 1988.

The symphony was Simpson's largest work to date and uses a reasonably large orchestra. This was Simpson's first 'orthodox' four movement symphony and is the only one consciously 'classical' in layout. The overall tonality is E♭, and the work contains many musical references to Ludwig van Beethoven and Joseph Haydn.

== Movements ==
The four movements are:

1. Allegro moderato
2. Presto (Scherzo and Trio)
3. Andante
4. Allegro vivace

In this work, Simpson began to make use of a characteristic harmonic device that resounds through his later music: he sometimes places chords that are identical in structure a fifth apart, usually in widely spaced registers, so that the higher chord sounds like harmonics of the lower one.

The first movement of the work, like the last, is continuously developing rather than duplicating classical sonata-forms, and introduces many of the main themes which return in the last movement. The second movement is a big Beethovenian scherzo which uses, in its trio, a literal quotation of the first movement's second subject group from Joseph Haydn's Symphony No. 76 and confronts it with a plethora of dissonances which cannot shake it from serenely going about its own business.

The third movement is one of Simpson's most lyrical slow movements, substituted for an original movement with which Simpson was unsatisfied after the first few performances as he felt it did not convey a level of expression consistent with the rest of the symphony. There is a prominent part for cello solo in its opening pages which is deeply expressive in character.

The last movement continues to develop material from the first and is one of the most frankly optimistic closes to any symphony by the composer.

== Discography ==
The first commercially available recording was a Hyperion Records release which also includes Symphony No. 2, both performed by the Bournemouth Symphony Orchestra conducted by Vernon Handley.

A recording by the Kensington Symphony Orchestra conducted by Russell Keable was recorded and released by Dunelm Records in 1995. This also includes music by William Walton and Dmitri Shostakovich.

== Recent performances ==
The work's documented (?) recent performance history is brief, and consists of approximately three recordings: a 1989 studio recording by Bryden Thomson and the BBC Welsh Symphony Orchestra, the 1995 recording with Russell Keable conducting the Kensington Symphony Orchestra (above noted), and (later broadcast) performance by the BBC Symphony Orchestra under Nicholas Kok in May 2001. The 2001 performance was broadcast in 2007 as part of a complete Simpson Symphony cycle over BBC Radio 3.
