= Symphony No. 10 (Simpson) =

Robert Simpson composed his Symphony No. 10 in 1988 and dedicated it to the conductor Vernon Handley who gave the premiere of the work in the Philharmonic Hall, Liverpool, on 16 January 1991 with the Royal Liverpool Philharmonic Orchestra. This is Simpson's largest and longest symphony, being one of his most contrapuntal works and in four substantial movements.

== Form ==
The symphony is approximately 51 minutes in length and is divided into four movements which broadly resemble a classical symphony structure:

1. Allegro
2. Allegro leggiero
3. Andante con moto
4. Largo – Allegro con brio

The symphony opens wrathfully and, like all the movements of the symphony, projects the leap of a minor third through three octaves from the orchestra, a motive that is used to provide much of the thematic and melodic material of the whole work. It develops without much affinity with a typical, classical sonata form, culminating in a massive coda in which the tempo broadens out.

The second movement is a relatively brief scherzo, played entirely ppp and seemingly evoking shimmering moths around a light at night, shifting rapidly in tonality. Throughout, there are hints of a vast tidal force just below the musical surface.

The third movement is a broad, calm movement in a three part section that includes a middle section whose overall tempo feel is double of the outer sections. Throughout there are hints of the very opening gesture of the work in the brass and woodwinds.

The work culminates in an enormous, 20 minute finale which was apparently inspired by the finale of the Beethoven Hammerklavier Sonata. It opens with a slow, mysterious introduction that gives way to a spirited, fiery fugal subject which becomes increasingly polyphonic and explores a wide range of orchestrational colours. It culminates in a furious battle from the two timpanists which closes with two sharp chords from the orchestra that recall the opening gesture, suggesting the argument has come full circle.

== Discography ==
Currently, the only commercially available CD is a Hyperion Records performed by the Royal Liverpool Philharmonic Orchestra conducted by Vernon Handley.
