= String Quartet No. 7 (Simpson) =

The String Quartet No. 7 by Robert Simpson was composed during 1977 and was dedicated to Lady Jeans (Susi Jeans, the organist) who requested the work. The Gabrieli String Quartet gave the first performance at a concert in Jeans’ home, Cleveland Lodge, Dorking, during a concert celebrating the centenary of her husband, the astronomer and mathematician Sir James Jeans. Simpson, himself a keen astronomer, draws parallels between this work and the universe – quiet and mysterious yet pulsating with energy. This quartet has become one of the most frequently heard of Simpson’s quartets.

The work falls into three distinct sections albeit in one movement. The opening section is marked Tranquillo, and begins quietly with the first violin sounding the note D which is joined by an upward moving line. By this means the vastness of space is evoked, and this whole first section develops slowly but purposefully in an organic way. Simpson likened the control of the music throughout this quartet to gravitation in space, particularly in regards to the open strings of the instruments, all of which are tuned in fifths.

The second section is a Vivace of around the same length, and from this point onwards the music becomes steadily more vigorous and energetic, with running triplet lines and further development of the material of the opening section. This Vivace culminates in a huge, intense climax which is the climax of the whole work – this restates the opening idea in a very different context and heralds the beginning of the final section, marked Tempo Primo.

Eventually the climax subsides, and the tranquillity of the opening is returned, now with the addition of rising scales among the counterpoint which give the effect of the music floating into space as it fades into silence.

A typical performance of this work lasts 18 to 20 minutes.

== Discography ==
Currently, the only commercially available CD is a Hyperion Records release which also includes String Quartet No. 8, both performed by the Delme Quartet .
