= Delmé Quartet =

- Origin: London, England
- Genre: Classical music
- Years active: 1962-2005
- Labels: Chandos Records, Hyperion Records
- Members: Granville Delmé Jones (1922-1968); Jürgen Hess; John Underwood; Joy Hall; Galina Solodchin; John Trusler; Jonathan Williams; Jeremy Painter; Stephen Orton; Jeremy Williams

The Delmé Quartet, aka The Delmé String Quartet, was a String quartet, founded in London in 1962. In 1967, it became the first string quartet to be attached to a British university as Artist-in-residence—in this case, the University of Sussex. The quartet also spent four years as performing Fellows at Lancaster University, and taught the art of quartet performance at the Guildhall School of Music and Drama. They toured extensively and released 30 albums.

== History ==
The Delmé Quartet was founded by former London Symphony Orchestra lead violinist Granville Delmé Jones, former English Chamber Orchestra violinist Jürgen Hess (violins), John Underwood (viola) and Joy Hall (cello), who came up with the idea during a cab ride over London Bridge. Their plan was to play for their own pleasure but when the BBC asked them to play in a concert series of international chamber music at Royal Festival Hall, they were 'discovered' and were immediately booked into a concert schedule. Jones died in 1968; he was replaced by Galina Solodchin. John Trusler and Jonathan Williams replaced Hess and Hall in the 1970s; Hess left to become Leader of the London Bach Orchestra. Painter joined the quartet in 1981.

The quartet collaborated with many notable composers, particularly with Robert Simpson—they recorded ten of his quartets, one of which (No. 9) they commissioned, plus his String Trio, the Clarinet Quintet (with Thea King), and the two-cello Quintet (with Christopher van Kampen). They also worked with John McCabe, Christopher Headington, Wilfred Josephs and Daniel Jones, whose quartets they performed regularly at Jones’s Gower Festival.

Members of the Delmé Quartet played on several recordings by The Beatles. Hall can be heard on "Strawberry Fields Forever"; Hess played on three Beatles albums: Revolver, Sgt. Pepper's Lonely Hearts Club Band and Yellow Submarine. On the latter album, Hall, Hess and Underwood are the notable strings performance on "Eleanor Rigby", and on "She's Leaving Home" from Sgt Pepper (among other songs). Solodchin played on three solo albums by Paul McCartney: Tug Of War (1992), Pipes Of Peace (1983) and Off The Ground (1993).

The Delmé Quartet performed internationally, including at the Salzburg Festival and, in 1993, at Dvořák in Prague: A Celebration. In Britain, they played the Edinburgh International Festival, the Cheltenham Music Festival, the Swaledale Festival, the Kings Lynn Festival and the Three Choirs Festival.

== Discography ==
- Six String Quartettos, Op. 1, Joseph Gehot (1965), Music in America, The Society For The Preservation Of The American Musical Heritage
- Ravel/Bax/Debussy, with the Robles Trio (1970), Argo Records
- Smetana / Brahms (1976), Audio Fidelity Records
- James Dawson, Soprano Saxophone, with James Dawson (1982), Crystal Records
- Daniel Jones, Three String Quartets (1982), Chandos Records
- Frank Bridge, Music for String Quartet (1983), Chandos Records
- David Wynne, String Quartet No. 5 / Music For Keyboards & Percussion, with Martin Jones, Richard McMahon, Tristan Fry and Michael Skinner (1983), Arts Council of Wales, Oriel Records
- Robert Simpson, String Quartet No. 9 (1984), Hyperion Records
- Robert Simpson, String Quartet No. 7 / String Quartet No. 8 (1984), Hyperion Records
- Journeys, Pete King (1984), New Southern Library
- Bliss String Quartets (1985), Hyperion Records
- Brahms / Dvořák with Keith Puddy (1987), IMP Classics
- Favourite Encores For String Quartet (1989), Helios Records
- Verdi / Strauss, String Quartets (1989), Hyperion Records
- Beethoven, String Quartets (1989), Helios Records
- Souvenir, with Tony Kinsey (1989), Ivy Leaf Records
- Robert Simpson String Quartet No. 1 / String Quartet No. 4 (1990), Hyperion Records
- A Shropshire Lad - Three Song Cycles To Poems By A. E. Housman (1990), Hyperion Records
- Robert Simpson String Quartet No. 2 / String Quartet No. 5 (1990), Hyperion Records
- Robert Simpson String Quartet No. 3 / String Quartet No. 6 (1990), Hyperion Records
- Haydn, The Seven Last Words Of Our Saviour On The Cross (1990), Hyperion Records
- Hummel, Three String Quartets Op 30 (1992), Hyperion Records
- Britten, Music For Oboe, Music For Piano, with Sarah Francis & Michael Dussek (1995), Hyperion Records
- Daniel Jones, Complete String Quartets (1996), Chandos Records
- Robert Simpson String Quartet No. 13 / String Quartet No. 2, with Thea King & Christopher van Kampen (1997), Hyperion Records
- Bach, Robert Simpson, The Art of Fugue (2000), Hyperion Records
- Bernard Stevens, Theme & Variations for String Quartet (2001), Albany Records
- Cypresses by Antonín Dvořák with Timothy Robinson and Graham Johnson (2004), Somm Recordings
- The Music Of Peter Wishart: A 25th Anniversary Celebration, compilation (2010), Priory Records
- Dvořák, String Quartets (2014), Somm Recordings
- String Quartets: Wind for Strings, compilation, various artists (2021), GTUK

== Soundtrack appearances ==
- Music on 2, Episode: Berg (1972)
- The Lively Arts, Episode: Bogey-Man - Prophet - Guardian 1 (1977)
- The Lively Arts, Episode: Bogey-Man - Prophet - Guardian 2 (1977)
- The Lively Arts, Episode: Berg (1977)
- Screen Two, Episode: 102 Boulevard Haussmann (1990)
- Simpatico (1999)
- Mom's Got a Date with a Vampire (2000)
