= String Quartet No. 9 (Simpson) =

String quartet

The String Quartet No. 9 by Robert Simpson was written in response to a commission by the Delme Quartet in 1982 to mark their 20th anniversary, one which coincided with the 250th anniversary of the birth of Joseph Haydn. Simpson was among five British composers to write works to mark this dual occasion, producing a very large set of variations on a Haydn theme, a work of some fifty-seven minutes in duration. Its first performance was given in the Wigmore Hall in London on 6 October 1982.

== Structure ==
The String Quartet No. 9 consists of thirty-two variations on a theme from the minuet from Joseph Haydn's Symphony No. 47 in G, followed by a large scale fugue. An aspect of this theme worth noting is that it is a palindrome – the second half of it is the first half played backwards. Each of Simpson's thirty-two variations on this theme is also palindromic.

There is also an overall tonal plan – the theme is in G, and so are the first fourteen variations. Variations XV to XIX descend in pitch by tones – F, E♭, D♭, B, A – regaining the original G for variations XX to XXII. From XXIII onwards the keys rise by tones from the semitone above G – A♭, B♭, C, D, E, F♯ - until G is regaining at XXIX and for the fugue. By this means all twelve tonalities are traversed.

== Composition ==
Simpson's variations I, II and III on Haydn's theme are all taken from a set in an earlier work from 1948, Variations on a Theme of Haydn, for solo piano. Variation I is at the same tempo as the theme, generally lyrical and in character with occasional chromatic swells to disturb the generally sunny atmosphere. Variation II is marked Meno mosso, poco espress. and is relaxed, the dynamic level pp throughout as the music flows lyrically through gentle counterpoint. Variation III strongly contrasts with the previous variation, each of the string instruments playing short, bouncy fragments that alternate between arco and pizzicato.

Variation IV is quicker still than the previous variation, all the strings in octave unison throughout playing semiquavers, with a crescendo to the middle point of the palindrome and a decrescendo to the end. Variation V, marked Molto allegro, is more dissonant and contrapuntal, built largely on triplet motives, and the tonality is more difficult to sense.

Variation VI is largely built up of contrapuntal lines divided by the interval of a fifth, giving a great impression of overall tonal progress, as does Variation VII which covers a similar procedure but has a different overall rhythmic character and lighter texture. Variation VIII is the harshest variation so far, built on dissonant clashes of the theme placed in parallel inversions. Variation IX is hardly less relieved, following a similar structure but different texture and rhythmic character (as did the pair of variations VI and VII).

The texture rapidly changes for Variations X, XI, XII and XIII, all of which are each only twelve bars in length. They form a group, each of the four variations become gradually louder and more urgent than the previous one. They all assume a similar character of rustling semiquavers and an expectant mood. A climax is reached with Variation XIV, rhythmically austere and at an intense ff. The variations up to this point can be seen to have made up a "fast movement".

This gives way to a slow movement which is made up by the broad Variations XV and XVI. The mood is contemplative and enigmatic, with a defining feature being a mysterious rise and fall of a semitone in the accompaniment of the viola melody in XV and the first violin melody in XVI.

This slow movement then gives way to what may be termed a little scherzo, made up by Variations XVII, XVIII and XIX. The dynamic level is ppp or pp throughout, the texture subdued and buzzing like insects. After a chromatic and ferocious Variation XX, there is another slow, mysterious Variation XXI in which the theme is distributed strangely around the instruments – this can be seen to act as a kind of trio that interrupts the fast scherzo movement. The fast music returns in Variations XXII and XXIII. In Variation XXIV there is a shifting of beats and parts, where the reverse part of the palindrome actually overlaps with its original, to peculiar effect. Variation XXV is another fast variation, marked Allegro molto vivace.

The mood changes again for Variations XXVI and XXVII which are both tuneful and relaxed, in particular XXVII which is in the ethereal key of E major. Two more contrasting variations follow, including the prestissimo Variation XXVIII and the intense Variation XXIX.

They give way to another slow movement that is made up by Variations XXX, XXXI, XXXII and the start of the fugue. Each of these three variations gradually builds in emotion – XXX is mysterious and dark, XXXI appears to be moving towards greater light. The final variation, XXXII, is the emotional highpoint of the three, a reflective adagissimo. This moves straight into the fugue without pause.

The Fuga, lasting approximately thirteen minutes, begins with a second violin solo, announcing a sad, lyrical subject that rises and falls gently. It is then joined by the viola which plays the theme in inversion, giving the music a modal texture. For several minutes the fugue progresses with a sorrowful mood, flowing with gentle counterpoint, before building to a climax. After the climax subsides the music becomes more fragmented and there is an overall feeling of expectancy for further developments. Here, the harmonic colour changes. Although the meter does not change throughout the fugue, the overall effect is an accelerando because note values are gradually shortened. Within several minutes a more intense allegro is reached. Towards the end the two types of harmonic colour are presented simultaneously as mirror images, yet neither triumphs over the other since the images hold each other in balance. The music is eventually called home by the first violin's insistence on the open G string – acting like the vortex of a whirlpool, irresistibly drawing all the other instruments from the musical maelstrom into itself.

== Critical reception ==
The overall critical reception of this work has been very favourable. The composer and musicologist Lionel Pike described it as a "remarkable tour de force...[Simpson] has explored thoroughly every facet of Haydn's theme in a way which for fertile imagination, invention, and contrapuntal skill challenges comparison with the variations J S Bach wrote for Goldberg to play to the insomniac Count Kayserling." Reviewing in Tempo, David J. Brown commented that "Simpson's ideas are so characterful that their reverses almost always are not only fascinating in themselves but throw more and different light on the original forms. What might to some composers have been an intolerable strait-jacket is to him a liberating tool" and described the final "slow movement" of the quartet – Variations XXX to the first half of the fugue – as having "an intensity and wholly unsentimental depth of feeling that matches anything in the quartets of Shostakovich, to look no further." A concluding remark was made - "However, perhaps the most remarkable thing about this remarkable work is that Simpson's response to his self-imposed intellectual challenge is full of emotional power as well-mind serving heart and vice versa in a rare way."

== Discography ==
Currently, the only commercially available CD is a Hyperion Records release performed by the Delme Quartet.
