= Basil Lam =

English musicologist (1914–1984)

Basil Raymond Lam (1914 - 4 March 1984) was an English early music scholar and harpsichordist. He was educated at Reading School and at St John's College, Oxford, where he studied English Literature.

A producer for the Third Programme of the BBC from its inception in September 1946, Lam eventually became head of the classical musical division in the 1960s. His contemporaries at the BBC included Deryck Cooke, William Glock, Hans Keller, Humphrey Searle, Robert Simpson and Leo Black. Simpson's String Quartet No. 4 is dedicated to Lam. He was best known for his contributions as a commentator on early and baroque music on BBC Radio 3, particularly the 28 episode series "Plainsong and the Rise of European Music" (1978–1979).

He also played harpsichord in several musical ensembles, including the Basil Lam Sonata Ensemble (1946-1954). Lam published many articles and books, specializing on Bach, Handel and Beethoven, and edited various musical scores, including editions of Rameau, Handel's Messiah and the lute music of Dowland.

== Selected publications ==
- Beethoven String Quartets, BBC Music Guides, Vols 32–33 (1975)
- 'Beethoven Symphonies', in Robert Simpson (ed.): The Symphony: Haydn to Dvořák (Penguin, 1967), pp. 104-174
- The Collected lute Music of John Dowland, with lute tablature and keyboard notation (with Diana Poulton) (Faber, 1974, 1978 and 1981)
- Handel: A Symposium (Oxford University Press, 1954), chapters on church and orchestral music.
- Of German Music: A Symposium (Oswald Wolf, 1976), chapter on the Classical Symphony
- 'The Ascendancy of Plainsong', The Listener, 15 December 1977, pp. 20-22
- 'Authenticity and the St John Passion', Early Music, Vol. 5, 1977, pp. 45–49
