= Matthew Taylor (composer) =

English composer and conductor

Matthew Taylor (born 6 December 1964) is an English composer and conductor.

== Biography ==
Taylor was born in London and attended the Junior Royal Academy of Music. He first studied composition with Robin Holloway at Queens' College, Cambridge University and later at Guildhall School of Music and Drama and at the Royal Academy of Music. He later continued his composition training with Robert Simpson and Sir Malcolm Arnold. As a conductor he trained with Robin Page, Vilém Tauský, and with Leonard Bernstein at the Schleswig-Holstein Musik festival.

Taylor appeared as Guest Conductor with the English Chamber Orchestra, Bournemouth Symphony Orchestra, City of London Sinfonia, Royal Ballet Sinfonia, European Community Chamber Orchestra and St Petersburg State Academic Orchestra and has recorded for Hyperion Records and Dutton. Matthew Taylor has conducted first performances of pieces by Robert Simpson, Vagn Holmboe, David Matthews and James Francis Brown.

Taylor's compositions, which include six symphonies, eight string quartets and a considerable body of other chamber music, have been performed by the BBC Symphony Orchestra, BBC Scottish Symphony Orchestra, John McCabe, Martyn Brabbins, George Hurst, Richard Watkins, Raphael Wallfisch and Kenneth Woods. He has been Artistic Director of the Malvern Festival, Composer in Residence at the Blackheath Halls, Associate Composer of ensemble Sound Collective, Artistic Director of the Royal Tunbridge Wells International Music Festival and Artistic Director of the St Petersburg British Music Festival.

Taylor was a lecturer in composition at the Royal Academy of Music and currently teaches composition at the Junior Academy.

== Works ==
Matthew Taylor's works are published by Edition Peters.

=== Orchestral ===
- Symphonies
  - Symphony No. 1 Sinfonia Brevis, Op. 2 (1985)
  - Symphony No. 2, Op. 10 (1991, revised 1997 and 2008)
  - Symphony No. 3, Op. 33 (2004)
  - Symphony No. 4, Op. 54 (2015-16)
  - Symphony No. 5, Op. 59 (2017-19)
  - Symphony No. 6 (2021)
- Lento for string orchestra, Op. 3 (1988, revised 1992)
- In Spring, Op. 4 (1989)
- Adagio for string orchestra (1998)
- The Needles, Op. 26 (2000)
- Romanza for string orchestra, op. 36b (2006)
- Storr, Op. 43 (2011)
- Lovely Joan, Op.57 for string orchestra (2018)

=== Concertante ===
- Piano Concerto, Op. 13 (1992)
- Clarinet Concerto, Op. 20 (1996)
- Horn Concerto, Op. 23 (1999, revised 2004)
- Double Bass Concerto, Op. 31 (2003)
- Viola Concerto "Humoreskes", Op. 41 (2010)
- Violin Concerto, Op. 42 (2011)
- Violin Concertino, Op. 52 (2016)
- Oboe Concerto, Op. 60 (2020-21) (fp. Presteigne Festival, 2021)
- Clarinet Concertino, Op. 63 (2020-21)

=== Band ===
- Blasket Dances for symphonic wind ensemble, Op. 24 (2001)

=== Chamber ===
- String Quartets
  - String Quartet No. 1, Op. 1 (1984)
  - String Quartet No. 2, Op. 8 (1990)
  - String Quartet No. 3, Op. 18 (1995)
  - String Quartet No. 4, Op. 22 (1999)
  - String Quartet No. 5, Op. 35 (2007)
  - String Quartet No. 6, Op. 36 (2008)
  - String Quartet No. 7, Op. 37 (2009)
  - String Quartet No. 8 Salutations and Celebrations, Op. 56 (2017)
- Introduction and Capriccio for wind octet (2 oboes, 2 clarinets, 2 bassoons, 2 horns), Op. 7 (1990)
- Night Visions for clarinet, violin, cello and piano, Op. 14 (1993)
- The Third Vision for oboe, horn, violin, cello and piano, Op. 14 No.3a (1997)
- Piano Trio, Op. 17 (1994)
- Conflict and Consolation for 4 horns, 3 trumpets, 3 trombones, tuba, timpani and percussion, Op. 19 (1996)
- Trio – In Memoriam V.H. for flute (alto flute), viola and cello, Op. 21 (1997)
- Four Lullabies for violin, viola, cello and piano, Op. 27 (2001)
- Adagio – Tribute to R.S. for string quartet, Op. 28 (1998)
- Skal for wind quintet (2004)
- Serenata Trionfale for wind octet (2 oboes, 2 clarinets, 2 bassoons, 2 horns), Op. 34 (2006)
- Trombone Quartet, Op. 38 (2009)

=== Instrumental ===
- Three Humoreskes for clarinet and piano, Op. 5 (1989)
- Prelude, Meditation and Toccata for marimba (1991)
- Violin Sonata, Op. 12 (1992, revised 1994)
- A July Pastoral for horn solo (1992) or for English horn (1993)
- Images in Spring for flute (piccolo) and piano, Op. 16 (1993)
- A June Cantilena for clarinet solo (1995)
- Romanza for cello and piano (1997)
- Cello Sonata, Op. 29 (2002)
- Fantasy Pieces for cello (or viola) and piano, Op. 30 (2002)
- Pastorals for violin and piano, Op. 32 (2003)
- Reflections for violin and piano, Op. 58 (2019)

=== Piano ===
- Anniversaries and Intermezzos (1990–1998, revised 1999)
- Four Bagatellas, Op. 6 (1989)
- Wassail for 4-hands, Op. 15 (1993)

=== Vocal/Choral ===
- Three Rupert Brooke Songs for mezzo-soprano and piano or orchestra (1995)
- A Christmas Blessing for mixed chorus (1998)
- Four Pope Epigrams for soprano, counter-tenor, cello and harpsichord, Op. 25 (1999)
- Bright is the Ring of Words for high voice and piano (2001)
