= Ian Craft =

British physician (1937–2019)

Ian Craft (11 July 1937 – 3 June 2019) was a British physician and pioneer of fertility treatment. He produced the first test-tube twins and the first triplets.

Craft died on 3 June 2019, aged 81.

Apart from his distinguished medical career, he built up a major collection of English watercolours.
