= Robert Simpson (composer) =

English composer

Robert Wilfred Levick Simpson (2 March 1921 – 21 November 1997) was an English composer, as well as a long-serving BBC producer and broadcaster.

He is best known for his orchestral and chamber music (particularly those in the key classical forms: 11 symphonies and 15 string quartets), and for his writings on the music of Beethoven, Bruckner, Nielsen and Sibelius. He studied composition under Herbert Howells. Remarkably for a living contemporary composer, a Robert Simpson Society was formed in 1980 by individuals concerned that Simpson's music had been unfairly neglected. The society aims to bring Simpson's music to a wider public by sponsoring recordings and live performances of his work, by issuing a journal and other publications, and by maintaining an archive of material relating to the composer. In 2021, he was featured as Composer of the Week on BBC Radio 3.

== Biography ==
Simpson was born in Leamington, Warwickshire. His father, Robert Warren Simpson, was a descendant of Sir James Young Simpson, the Scottish pioneer of anaesthetics; his mother, Helena Hendrika Govaars, was the daughter of Gerrit Govaars, founder of the Leger des Heils, the Dutch arm of the Salvation Army. Simpson studied at Westminster City School. He was intended for a medical career and studied in London for two years before his determination to be a musician gained the upper hand. A conscientious objector in World War II, he served with an ARP mobile surgical unit during the London Blitz, while taking lessons from Herbert Howells. Howells persuaded him to take the Durham University Bachelor of Music degree, and in 1952 he gained the further degree of Doctor of Music from that university, the submitted work being his First Symphony. After the war Simpson lectured extensively and founded the Exploratory Concerts Society; in 1951 he joined the music staff of the BBC and became one of its best-known and most respected music producers, remaining with the corporation for nearly three decades. Simpson was a great champion of Havergal Brian's music, and under the BBC's auspices he produced many broadcasts featuring Brian's works. These included the mammoth "Gothic" Symphony in 1966 under Sir Adrian Boult, and in 1973 the 28th Symphony under Leopold Stokowski who, at the age of 91, was premiering a work by a 91-year-old composer.

In the latter part of his career as a BBC producer Simpson frequently clashed with the management of the organisation. In the 1970s he was one of those – Hans Keller and Deryck Cooke were others – who started the (unsuccessful) revolt against the report Broadcasting in the Seventies and its plan for "generic broadcasting" (i.e. separate networks for pop, classical and speech). A decade later Simpson was energetic in his opposition to a cost-cutting reorganisation that ultimately proposed the decommissioning of five of the eleven BBC orchestras. During the ensuing musicians' strike (which caused the cancellation of the first several weeks of the 1980 BBC Promenade Concerts) Simpson chose to disregard BBC staff regulations and discuss the matter with a national newspaper; he then resigned from the corporation, publicly alleging a "degeneration of traditional BBC values in the scramble for ratings". (Hans Keller later described these criticisms as "demonstrable fact".) Had Simpson remained silent for a few more months he would have been able to retire with a full pension, but his feeling was that such a course would have compromised his principles. Abominating the ethos of Thatcherite Britain, in 1986 he moved to the Republic of Ireland, settling on Tralee Bay in County Kerry. In 1991, he suffered a severe stroke during an English lecture tour, which caused damage to the thalamus and left him in debilitating pain for the remaining six years of his life. He died in Tralee in 1997, aged 76.

Simpson married Bessie Fraser in 1946; she died in 1981, and the following year he married Angela Musgrave, a fellow BBC employee and relative of composer Thea Musgrave. His other great passions, outside music, were astronomy (he was a member of the British Astronomical Association and – unusually for an amateur – was made a Fellow of the Royal Astronomical Society) and pacifism, specifically addressed in the title of his Tenth String Quartet, For Peace. He was awarded many honours, including the Carl Nielsen Gold Medal, 1956 (for his book Carl Nielsen, Symphonist, published in 1952), and the Medal of Honor of the Bruckner Society of America, 1962. He refused appointment as a Commander of the Order of the British Empire in 1980. In his letter of rejection, he wrote: "While I am most appreciative of the intended honour, it could not properly be accepted by a determined republican in whom memory of the British Empire arouses no nostalgia." Politically, he was a lifelong socialist.

== Music ==
Dedicated as he was to renewing the classical tradition of a dynamic musical architecture built on the gravitational power of tonality, Simpson wrote very few small or occasional works and concentrated on large-scale genres. He wrote 11 symphonies as well as concertos for violin, piano, flute and cello. (The Violin Concerto was subsequently withdrawn.) His extensive output of chamber music comprised 15 string quartets, two string quintets, a clarinet quintet, piano trio, clarinet trio, horn trio, violin sonata and a number of non-standard chamber ensemble works as well as works for piano, a sonata for two pianos, and a major organ work entitled Eppur si muove (after the famous remark attributed to Galileo). He tended to avoid vocal music but his output includes two motets. Variation form was important to him, and in addition to variation-movements on his own themes he composed orchestral variations on themes of Nielsen and Johann Sebastian Bach, as well as a set of piano variations on a palindromic theme by Haydn to which he returned in his large-scale String Quartet No. 9, which is a series of 32 variations and a fugue on the same Haydn theme. String Quartets Nos. 4–6 can be regarded as variations upon the compositional processes, rather than the themes, of Beethoven's three Rasumovsky Quartets, Op. 59.

Two significant features of Simpson's oeuvre are his ability to write long works entirely based on a single basic pulse, with faster or slower tempi being suggested by smaller or larger note-values, and the establishment of a dynamic tension between competing tonalities or intervals.

=== Symphonies ===
"People who write symphonies do it because they feel able to: a lot of those who don't tell everyone else the symphony is dead ... The trouble is that the symphony as an abstraction does not exist: there may be exhausted symphonies and exhausted composers, but the response to a challenge to one's capacity for large-scale organisation and development – that can be exhausted only in individuals."

Robert Simpson is said to have written and destroyed four symphonies (one of which even used serial procedures) before his first published symphony. The official, published symphonies include the following:

- Symphony No. 1 (1951), doctorate thesis for the University of Durham
- Symphony No. 2 (1955–1956), dedicated to Anthony Bernard
- Symphony No. 3 (1962), dedicated to Havergal Brian
- Symphony No. 4 (1970–1972), commissioned by the Hallé Orchestra
- Symphony No. 5 (1972), dedicated to the London Symphony Orchestra
- Symphony No. 6 (1977), dedicated to the renowned gynaecologist Ian Craft
- Symphony No. 7 (1977), dedicated to Hans Keller and his wife, the artist Milein Cosman
- Symphony No. 8 (1981), dedicated to the painter Anthony Dorrell
- Symphony No. 9 (1985–1987), dedicated to his wife, Angela
- Symphony No. 10 (1988), dedicated to Vernon Handley
- Symphony No. 11 (1990), dedicated to Matthew Taylor

From 1987 to 1996 Vernon Handley recorded all but one of the symphonies for Hyperion Records, with the Royal Philharmonic Orchestra (in 1, 3, 5 and 8), the Bournemouth Symphony Orchestra (2, 4 and 9) and the Royal Liverpool Philharmonic Orchestra (6, 7 and 10). The cycle was completed in 2003 when No. 11 was recorded by its dedicatee, Matthew Taylor, conducting the City of London Sinfonia.

=== Concertos ===
Violin Concerto (1959)
A work of some forty minutes, dedicated to the violinist Ernest Element, withdrawn by the composer late in his life. Simpson had considered revising the work, and Matthew Taylor has reworked the composition to fulfil Simpson's original intentions.
Piano Concerto (1967)
A one-movement twenty-minute work, falling into several sections and written for the pianist John Ogdon. The concerto is one of his most big-hearted and instantly accessible scores.
Flute Concerto (1989)
A one movement work of twenty-five minutes duration, commissioned by and dedicated to the flautist Susan Milan. The work embraces a calmness in the manner of Symphony No. 11.
Cello Concerto (1991)
A one-movement variation-form work of twenty-three minutes duration, commissioned by and dedicated to the cellist Raphael Wallfisch. The work begins vigorously and ends in an atmosphere of contemplative mystery.

=== Quartets ===
Simpson composed 15 numbered string quartets; a quartet preceding this sequence was written as part of his course at Durham University and still exists there. He regarded Quartets Nos. 1–3 as forming a natural sequence, and Nos. 4–6 are a clearly distinct group related to three Beethoven quartets, though they can all be performed as entirely independent compositions. The second movement of No. 8 has the label Eretmapodites gilletti, and the quartet is dedicated to two people including the discoverer of the mosquito with that scientific name; the ninth quartet, from 1982, is a one-movement (but subdivided, with slow and scherzando sections) palindromic 32 Variations and Fugue on a Theme by Haydn; Number 10 is entitled "For Peace". (See the article by Malcolm MacDonald in the External Links.)

In programme notes for a recital consisting of quartets nos. 1–3 at the Arts Council of Great Britain building in London SW1 on 11 February 1955, Simpson wrote that "although they were not consciously designed as a group, they nevertheless seem to fall into a natural sequence". In construction and tonality there are elements of an overall symmetry encompassing the three works.

String Quartet No. 1 (1951–52)
is in two movements, quick and slow; the second movement is a set of variations on a palindromic theme stated by the viola. There is a power-struggle by the opposed tonal centres of E flat and A: E flat is the focus of the first movement and beats off the challenge of A, the second movement theme starts and ends in E flat with a central climax in A; the variations work round to A major, in which key the work ends. The quartet is dedicated to George Enescu.
String Quartet No. 2 (1953)
is the shortest of all Simpson's quartets, playing for about 15 minutes. It is cast in a single movement and a single metronome mark, within which three themes (and three tempi) contest for dominance.
String Quartet No. 3 (1953–54)
is in two movements, slow and quick: an Adagio in C major and a pulsing Allegro deciso that works round to an affirmative E major. (Simpson made a transcription of this movement as an independent piece for full string orchestra.)

Simpson stated that String Quartets Nos. 4–6, which are on a much larger scale than Nos. 1–3, constituted "a close study of Beethoven's three Rasumovsky quartets, Op. 59; that is to say, the attempt to understand those great works resulted in, not a verbal analysis, but music". The three Simpson quartets offer, in his own idiom, "musical analogies" to the procedures of Beethoven's three quartets, but they can be performed without reference to the Beethoven and indeed without reference to each other.

String Quartet No. 4 (1973)
is dedicated to Basil Lam. The four movements – an Allegro, a Presto scherzo, an Andante sostenuto slow movement joining on without a break to an Assai vivace finale – correspond to the layout of Beethoven's op.59 no.1.
String Quartet No. 5 (1974)
is dedicated to Angela Musgrave, who became the composer's second wife. The four movements – an Allegro molto with a written-out literal repeat of the exposition, an Adagio, sempre semplice, an Allegretto vivace and a whirlwind Prestissimo finale – correspond to the layout of Beethoven's Op. 59, No. 2.
String Quartet No. 6 (1975)
is dedicated to the film-maker Barrie Gavin and his wife Jamila. Of the four movements, the first begins with an Adagio introduction exploring an enigmatic harmony, prefacing a large-scale Vivacissimo; the second is an intermezzo-like Con moto; grazioso ed intensivo, the third a complex Canon marked Molto tranquillo with an Allegretto grazioso middle section, and the finale is marked Molto rapido – these correspond to the layout of Beethoven's op.59 no.3, which begins with a slow introduction exploring a particular harmony and includes an archaic form (a Minuet) as its third movement.

Quartets Nos. 7 and 8 both explore the possibilities of the perfect fifth in shaping their themes, harmonies and tonalities.

String Quartet No. 7 (1977)
is dedicated to the organist Susi Jeans and written in celebration of the birth-centenary of her husband, the astronomer Sir James Jeans. The work is in a single movement and makes much use of the open strings of the instruments, whose tuning Simpson likened to the forces of gravitation. This leads the work to revolve around the circle of fifths. The slow opening Tranquillo and closing Tempo primo enclose a fast section, Vivace, intended to represent the pulsing energy of the universe.
String Quartet No. 8 (1979)
is dedicated to the biologist and entomologist J.D. Gillett and his wife. There are four movements, the tonality of each being a fifth higher than that of its predecessor. The first is a large-scale fugue, Grave, molto intensivo, the second is a brief scherzo (Molto vivace), 'suggesting the formidable delicacy' of the mosquito Eretmapodites Gilletti. The third is an intermezzo, Allegretto grazioso, played with mutes. The finale is a strenuous Risoluto e concentrato to balance the first movement.
String Quartet No. 9 (1982)
is subtitled 32 Variations and Fugue on a Theme of Haydn and was dedicated to the Delmé Quartet, who commissioned it, on their 20th anniversary, which was also the 250th anniversary of the birth of Haydn. At about 57 minutes' duration, it is one of the longest continuous movements for string quartet ever written. The theme is the palindromic minuet which Haydn used in his Symphony No. 47 and Piano Sonata No.26. Simpson had already composed a set of piano variations on this minuet in 1948, and three of those variations are transcribed as variations I-III of the quartet. The 32 quartet variations take Simpson's fascination with formal symmetry to a new extreme, though they are grouped to correspond to first movement, scherzo and slow movement. The free-form fugue forms the finale, gaining energy and speed as it proceeds.
String Quartet No. 10 (1983)
bears the title For Peace and was composed for the tenth anniversary of the Coull Quartet. Simpson said that the title "refers to its generally pacific character ... The music ... tries to define the condition of peace. This excludes aggression but not strong feeling." The three movements are a serene Allegretto, a very short Prestissimo scherzo and a concluding Molto adagio, longer than the other two movements combined, which climaxes in a fugue and ends in a peaceful epilogue.
String Quartet No. 11 (1984)
was also written for the Coull Quartet and shares some material with No. 10, but is much more turbulent and intense in character: Simpson said he was conscious of the influence of Beethoven's F minor Quartet, Op.95 in this work. Quartet No. 11 is in a single large movement and is concerned with salient intervals including the tritone and the major third. An opening Allegro molto is followed by a polyphonic Adagio, a large-scale Scherzo (Presto) and a concluding Molto adagio played pianissimo throughout.
String Quartet No. 12 (1987)
was commissioned for the 1988 Nottingham Festival. This work is in two large movements, a meditative and polyphonic Adagio and a Molto vivace combining the characters of scherzo and finale.
String Quartet No. 13 (1989)
was commissioned for the 1990 Cardiff Festival and was premiered there by the Delmé Quartet. It is dedicated to the BBC producer Graham Melville-Mason and his wife Alex. This is the shortest of Simpson's later quartets (only No. 2 is shorter) and is in four concise movements, played without any break, in a fast-slow-fast-slow pattern.
String Quartet No. 14 (1990)
is a large-scale work in the traditional four movements. The slow movement has been particularly praised for its meditative beauty.
String Quartet No. 15 (1991)
is a shorter work in one movement with three contrasting sections, an Adagio introduction and an Allegretto finale framing a large central scherzo, marked Severo. The character of this quartet is turbulent and granitic, rather in the manner of String Quartet No. 11.

=== Other chamber music ===
Clarinet Quintet (1968)
This is a large-scale work in five movements forming an arch shape – a central scherzo of some 800 bars is framed by two slow movements, which themselves are framed by two outer fast movements. The arch shape is completed by a slow introduction and a slow coda. The entire basis of the material for the work is outlined in the opening introduction, with the main theme having some sort of parallel with Beethoven's C sharp minor quartet. It is one of Simpson's more subtle and enigmatic scores, with an epilogue of almost naive, diatonic fluidity and rising scales.
Violin Sonata (1984)
This is a two movement structure, the first movement a vigorous Allegro, and the second combining the characters of a slow movement, scherzo and finale. Throughout there is a conflict between G major and G minor – particularly guided by the intervals of a major third and a minor third, which are often combined and pushed against each other to create strange resonances – for example G to B flat in the low register of the piano, and B natural to D in the upper register.
String Trio (1987)
A three movement work. An opening Prelude (Presto) and a concluding Fugue (Volante) are separated by a central Adagio. It is dedicated to Jillian White of BBC Bristol.
String Quintet No. 1 (1987)
A long one-movement work alternating slow and fast sections. It contains some of the most peaceful music the composer ever wrote.
String Quintet No. 2 (1995)
This was Simpson's final work. Most of it was completed in 1991, before Simpson was paralysed with a stroke that left him in permanent pain, but the final coda was dictated to his wife several years later. It is one of Simpson's most severe and dark scores, its structure is built on a minimal amount of material and there is an alternation between two tempo types – an austere, lyrical moderato and a knotty allegro. The slow, final coda is one of the darkest endings in all string chamber music literature.

=== Compositions for brass band ===
- Energy (1971), Test Piece, Brass Band World Championships
- Volcano (1979), Test Piece, National Brass Band Championships of Britain
- The Four Temperaments, Suite for Brass Band (1983). The composer also re-orchestrated this work for orchestral brass.
- Introduction and Allegro on a Bass of Max Reger (1987)
- Vortex (1989)

=== Compositions for keyboard instruments ===
- Piano Sonata (1946)
- Variations and Finale on a Theme of Haydn for solo piano (1948)
- Michael Tippett, His Mystery for solo piano (1984)
- Eppur si muove, Ricercar and Passacaglia for organ (1985)
- Variations and Finale on a Theme by Beethoven for solo piano (1990)
- Sonata for Two Pianos (1980 rev. 1990)

== Books and articles ==
As a writer on music (he would have disavowed the title 'musicologist'), Simpson was guided by his deep admiration for Tovey's ability to discuss a composer's sophisticated treatment of forms and keys in a manner that was accurate and incisive without ever alienating the non-specialist reader. His earliest published writings were as a reviewer and critic; but before long his focus had shifted towards being an advocate for widely unappreciated or misunderstood composers like Anton Bruckner, Carl Nielsen and Jean Sibelius, as well as to the analysis of better-known figures (such as Beethoven) whenever he felt able to illuminate their work from a composer's perspective. His writings can usefully be divided into five categories: (i) books written by Simpson; (ii) books edited by Simpson; (iii) contributions to other books and collections; (iv) posthumous collections of articles; (v) individual articles, programme- and sleeve-notes, etc.

=== Authored by Simpson ===
- Carl Nielsen: Symphonist (1952, rev. 1979).
- Bruckner and the Symphony (1963).
- Sibelius and Nielsen: a Centenary Essay (1965).
- The Essence of Bruckner: An Essay Towards the Understanding of his Music (1966; revised edition, 1992).
- Beethoven Symphonies (1970).
- The Proms and Natural Justice: A Plan for Renewal (with foreword by Sir Adrian Boult; 1980).
- Simpson on Beethoven: Essays, Lectures and Talks by R. Simpson, Selected and Edited by Lionel Pike (1996)

=== Edited by Simpson ===
- The Symphony (2 Vols; Ed. R. Simpson; 1966). Besides writing the 'Introduction' to the first volume and the preliminary essay 'Stravinsky, Hindemith and Others' of the second, Simpson added several pithy editorial footnotes to the chapters of his contributors. In addition, he wrote the essay on Rachmaninoff found in Volume 2. The chapters on Mendelssohn, Schumann, Brahms, and Dvořák were written by composer and conductor Julius Harrison, and the two-volume work is dedicated to Harrison's name.

=== Contributions ===
- 'Ianus Germinus: Music in Scandinavia' (1960), in Twentieth Century Music – an International Symposium of Essays on Current Trends in Music, Ed. R. Meyers. (1960; reissued 1968).
- Foreword to: Beethoven, Sibelius and the 'Profound Logic': Studies in Symphonic Analysis", by Lionel Pike (1978).
- 'Beethoven Concertos', in A Guide to the Concerto, Ed. Robert Layton (1988)
- 'Carl Nielsen Now: A Personal View', in The Nielsen Companion, Ed. Mina F. Miller (1995).
- Foreword to: Experiencing Music (Musicians on Music, No. 5), by Vagn Holmboe, Ed. and Trans. Paul Rapoport (1991).

=== Various pieces ===
- 'The Seventh Symphony of Bruckner: An Analysis' Music Review (1947): 178–187.
- 'More Reflections (After Composition)', Tempo No 144 (1983).
- Programme note for British premiere of original 1873 edition of Bruckner's Symphony No 3, Royal Philharmonic Society (9 December 1987).
- Program Notes for the Vanbrugh Quartet's Beethoven String Quartet cycle (19??).
- Sleeve notes for the Delme Quartet's recording of Bach's 'Die Kunst der Fuge' arr. R. Simpson (19??).
- 'Fiftieth Birthday Essays': A Tribute to Robert Simpson, with articles by Jascha Horenstein, Robert Layton, Hans Keller, Hugh Ottoway, Peter Dobson and Ainslee Cox. Edited by Edward Johnson for Triad Press (1971).

== Work as record producer ==
Robert Simpson was also the producer for the first commercially available recordings of Havergal Brian’s music. Symphonies Nos. 10 and 21, conducted by James Loughran and Eric Pinkett respectively, were recorded at the De Montfort Hall, Leicester in 1972. The music was performed by the Leicestershire Schools Symphony Orchestra and the LP was released by Unicorn Records to great critical acclaim in 1973. A special edition of the television programme Aquarius called The Unknown Warrior gave considerable coverage to the recording session and a camera crew also joined Robert Simpson and members of the orchestra during a visit they made to the composer's home in Shoreham (see video links below). Following the success of the Unicorn issue, a second Brian album, also produced by Robert Simpson, was recorded by the LSSO in 1974 at Hove Town Hall and Leicester De Montfort Hall with the conducting being shared by László Heltay and Eric Pinkett. This CBS release included the 22nd Symphony, Brian's setting of the 23rd Psalm (which clearly belongs to the mainstream British choral tradition of Vaughan Williams and Parry) and the English Suite Rustic Scenes which contains some highly original music.

== Writings ==
- Simpson, Robert (1979) [1st ed. 1952]. Carl Nielsen: Symphonist (2nd revised and expanded ed.). London: Kahn & Averill. ISBN 978-0-900707-96-4.
