= Vernon Handley =

British conductor (1930–2008)

Vernon George "Tod" Handley CBE (11 November 1930 – 10 September 2008) was a British conductor, known in particular for his support of British composers.

== Early life and education ==
He was born of a Welsh father and an Irish mother into a musical family in Enfield, Middlesex. He acquired the nickname "Tod" because his feet were turned in at his birth, which his father simply summarised: "They toddle". Handley preferred the use of the name "Tod" throughout his life over his given names.

Handley attended Enfield Grammar School. While in school, he watched the BBC Symphony Orchestra in its studio in Maida Vale, where by his own account he learned some of his conducting technique by observing Sir Adrian Boult. Later the two corresponded in the early 1950s and met around 1958. He spent a period in the Armed Forces and then attended Balliol College, Oxford, where he read English philology and became musical director of the University Dramatic Society. He also studied at the Guildhall School of Music in London, where his performing instrument was the double bass (in addition to the trombone and violin). After graduating he worked as a nursery gardener, bricklayer and petrol pump attendant during the day, studying and conducting amateur orchestras and choirs in the evening. He then became Sir Adrian Boult's pupil. During their first meeting he "was put through the worst two hours of counterpoint and harmony that I've ever faced" and was then asked how he would conduct a page of a score that Boult put in front of him, Arnold Bax's Third Symphony, which Handley happened to have studied. Handley later conducted that work in the first concert he gave in London, with the symphony orchestra of Morley College. Handley remained a devoted champion of the music of Bax throughout his career.

== Career ==
Vernon Handley's first professional engagement was in 1960, conducting the Bournemouth Symphony Orchestra. In 1962, Handley was appointed the musical director of the newly formed Guildford Philharmonic Orchestra, with which he programmed much of Bax's music and made the first recording of Bax's Symphony No. 4. Handley and the orchestra also recorded Gerald Finzi's Intimations of Immortality. He also began conducting non-UK orchestras such as the Amsterdam Philharmonic, Stockholm Philharmonic, Swedish Radio Symphony Orchestra, Malmö Symphony and Berlin Radio Symphony; he led the Strasbourg Philharmonic through a UK tour in 1982 consisting of French and Russian music. In 1983 he was appointed Associate Conductor of the London Philharmonic Orchestra. He was Principal Conductor of the Ulster Orchestra from 1985 to 1989, and had the title of Conductor Laureate from 2003 until his death. From 1986 to 1988, he was chief conductor of the Malmö Symphony Orchestra and was active with several other Swedish orchestras, broadcasting regularly on Swedish radio.

He held assistant conductorships elsewhere, was Conductor Emeritus of the Royal Liverpool Philharmonic Orchestra, and conducted a number of others in concert, for broadcast and for recording. Handley was appointed Principal Conductor of the English Symphony Orchestra in January 2007.

Handley is much revered for his enthusiastic and untiring championship of British music, including many lesser known, unfashionable or relatively neglected composers whose artistic reputations and popularity he often helped to revive. Although he claimed to be just as attached to composers from elsewhere, the majority (some 90 out of 160) of Handley's recordings were of British music. He is said to have recorded as many as a hundred premières of British works, including highly successful series on Hyperion Records of the symphonies of Robert Simpson and Sir Granville Bantock. Simpson dedicated his Symphony No. 10 to Handley. According to Lewis Foreman, Handley "single handedly transformed the reception of the music of Granville Bantock." He also went on to make the first largely complete official recording of Bantock's monumental Omar Khayyám setting. He contributed a foreword to Alan Poulton's Dictionary-Catalog of Modern British Composers (Greenwood Press) and to a book on Adrian Boult. He also recorded symphonies by Bax, Moeran and Stanford for Chandos Records as well as discs of other orchestral works. Handley recorded the symphonies of Elgar and Vaughan Williams for EMI. Handley also recorded many works by Sir Malcolm Arnold for Conifer Records, which were subsequently reissued in the UK by Decca Records. He felt that his career might have suffered because of to his championing of British music, but said "I believe there are two sorts of conductors – musician conductors and career conductors. I have always tried to be the former... and I really wouldn't have it any other way".

Handley held clear views on the style of conductors, saying "Music isn't mime; you shouldn't fraudulently convince people that they have heard what they haven't", and stating "jet-set musical careers... are little to do with the work, more to do with PR". Questioning the influence of television on conducting, Handley recalled Boult telling him, "Do remember, won't you, that you are playing to the blind man in the audience." In April 1989 he presented the hour-long documentary programme on BBC TV on Boult's hundredth anniversary.

Handley received numerous awards, such as The Gramophone magazine's Special Achievement Award in 2003 for services to British Music (sparking a "Nod for Tod" honours campaign); and the Lifetime Achievement Award at the Classical BRIT Awards on 3 May 2007 at the Royal Albert Hall. He was appointed a Commander of the Order of the British Empire (CBE) in the 2004 Queen's Birthday Honours (having declined appointment as an Officer of the order in 1988). He held an Honorary Doctorate from the University of Surrey and was a Fellow of the Royal College of Music.

Handley had been scheduled to conduct Prom 2 of the 2008 BBC Proms season on 19 July, but withdrew because of ill health; Paul Daniel replaced him. After Handley's death, the director of The Proms, Roger Wright, announced the dedication of the 10 September Prom concert (Prom 73) to Handley.

== Personal life and death ==
Handley married and divorced three times. He met his first wife, Barbara Black, while studying at Balliol. They married in 1954 and had a daughter and two sons, one of whom died aged 13 months. His second marriage in 1977 to Victoria Parry-Jones produced a son and a daughter. His third marriage to the flautist Catherine Newby in 1987 produced a son.

Handley died at his home in Skenfrith, Monmouthshire, on 10 September 2008, at the age of 77.

== Discography ==
Year	Recording
1965	Arnold Bax -Symphonic Variations with Guildford Philharmonic Orchestra for Concert Artist.; Bax - Symphony No. 4 and E. J. Moeran's Serenade with Guildford PO for Concert Artist.
1972	Geoffrey Bush - Music for Orchestra with London Philharmonic Orchestra for Lyrita.
1974	Ralph Vaughan Williams - Fantasia on a Theme by Thomas Tallis with London Philharmonic Orchestra for EMI's Classics for Pleasure (CfP); Pyotr Ilyich Tchaikovsky - Hamlet Overture-Fantasy, with London PO for CfP.; David Bedford - Star's End with Mike Oldfield and the Royal Philharmonic Orchestra
1975	Gerald Finzi - Intimations of Immortality with Guildford PO for Lyrita.
1976	Geoffrey Bush - Yorick Overture with New Philharmonia Orchestra for Lyrita.; Cyril Rootham - Symphony No. 1 and Josef Holbrooke's The Birds of Rhiannon Op. 87 with London PO for Lyrita.
1977	Frederick Delius - Summer Night on the River, A Song Before Sunrise, The Walk To the Paradise Garden, On Hearing the First Cuckoo in Spring, La Calinda, Sleigh Ride and Irmelin Prelude with London PO for CfP.; Elizabeth Maconchy - "Proud Thames" Overture with London PO for Lyrita.; Vaughan Williams - A London Symphony with London PO for EMI.
1978	Edward Elgar - Falstaff and Cockaigne with London PO for CfP; William Walton - Symphony No. 1 with Royal Liverpool Philharmonic Orchestra for ASV.; Arthur Bliss - Adam Zero with Royal Liverpool PO for EMI.
1979	Patrick Hadley - The Trees So High with Guildford Philharmonic Choir and New Philharmonia Orchestra for Lyrita.; Grace Williams - Symphony No. 2 and Ballads with the BBC Welsh Symphony Orchestra for BBC Regium reissued by Lyrita.; E. J. Moeran - Violin Concerto with London Symphony Orchestra for Lyrita.; Elizabeth Maconchy - Serenata Concertante with LSO for Lyrita.; Arthur Bliss - Discourse for Orchestra, Edinburgh Overture, and Meditations on a Theme by John Blow with City of Birmingham Symphony Orchestra for EMI.; Vaughan Williams - Symphony No. 6 and Prelude and Fugue with London PO for EMI.
1980	Elgar - Pomp and Circumstance Marches with London PO for CfP; Sibelius - Concert works for Violin: Two Pieces, Op.77, Serenades, Op.69, Six Humoresques, Op.87 with Ralph Holmes, Berlin Radio Orch (Koch-Schwann)
1981	Elgar - Symphony No. 1, Symphony No.2 and Sea Pictures with LPO for CfP; Delius - Brigg Fair, In A Summer Garden, Eventyr, and A Song of Summer with Hallé Orchestra for CfP.
1982	Delius - Cello Concerto; Holst - Invocation; Vaughan Williams - Fantasia on Sussex Folk Tunes; Julian Lloyd Webber, cello, Philharmonia Orchestra, RCA
1983	Vaughan Williams - The Wasps Overture and Serenade to Music; Delius - Two Pieces for Small Orchestra, Summer Evening and Air And Dance with London PO for Chandos.; Wolfgang Amadeus Mozart - Symphony No. 39 with London PO for Chandos.; Antonín Dvořák - Symphony No. 8 and Nocturne for Strings with London PO for Chandos.; Elgar - Enigma Variations, Introduction and Allegro and Serenade with London PO for CfP.
1984	Vaughan Williams - Job with London PO for CfP; Elgar - Violin Concerto with London PO and Nigel Kennedy for CfP
1985	Vaughan Williams - Five Variants of Dives and Lazarus, The Lark Ascending, and The Wasps - Aristophanic Suite with London PO for CfP; Dvořák - In Nature's Realm Overture, Carnival Overture, Othello Overture and Scherzo Capriccioso with Ulster Orchestra for Chandos.; Delius - Florida Suite and North Country Sketches with Ulster Orchestra for Chandos.
1986	Charles Villiers Stanford - Symphony No.3 and Irish Rhapsody No.5 with Ulster Orchestra for Chandos.; Bax - On The Sea Shore; Benjamin Britten - Four Sea Interludes and Passacaglia; Frank Bridge - The Sea; with Ulster Orchestra for Chandos.; Concertos for kettledrums by Hertel, Jean-Baptiste Prin and Werner Thärichen, with Thärichen, Bardach and Berlin Radio Symphony Orchestra (Koch-Schwann); Bax - Spring Fire, Northern Ballad No. 2 and Symphonic Scherzo with Royal Philharmonic Orchestra for Chandos.; Bliss - A Colour Symphony and Checkmate Suite with Ulster Orchestra for Chandos.; Edvard Grieg - Peer Gynt Suite No. 1, Two Elegiac Melodies, Sigurd Jorsalfar and Symphonic Dances with Ulster Orchestra for Chandos.; Gerald Finzi - Cello Concerto; Kenneth Leighton - Veris Gratia Suite; with Royal Liverpool Philharmonic Orchestra and Raphael Wallfisch for Chandos.
1987	Vaughan Williams - Symphony No. 5 and Flos Campi with Royal Liverpool PO for CfP; Robert Simpson - Symphonies No. 6 and 7 with Royal Liverpool PO for Hyperion.; Stanford - Symphony No. 5 and Irish Rhapsody No.4 with Ulster Orchestra for Chandos.; Moeran - Violin Concerto, Symphony and Overture for a Masque with Ulster Orchestra for Chandos; Jean Sibelius - Violin Concerto and Ernest Chausson's Poeme for violin and orchestra with Royal PO for Chandos.; Dvorák - Biblical Songs, Op. 99 with Birgit Finnilä, alto and Malmö Symphony Orchestra for Big Ben Phonogram; Fernström – Symphony No. 12, Op. 92 with Malmö Symphony Orchestra for Big Ben Phonogram; Dvorák – Tone Poems op. 107, 109, 110 with Malmö Symphony Orchestra for Big Ben Phonogram
1988	Vaughan Williams - A Sea Symphony with Royal Liverpool PO for CfP; William Walton - Symphony No. 1 and Variations on a Theme by Hindemith with Bournemouth Symphony Orchestra for EMI.; Simpson - Symphony No. 9 with Bournemouth SO for Hyperion.; Bridge - Phantasm; Walton - Sinfonia Concertante; John Ireland - Piano Concerto in E flat; with Royal PO and Kathryn Stott for Conifer.; Stanford - Symphony No. 6 and Irish Rhapsody No. 1 with Ulster Orchestra for Chandos.; Moeran - Rhapsody for Piano and Orchestra, Rhapsodies No. 1 and 2 for Orchestra, and Serenade with Ulster Orchestra for Chandos.; Johannes Brahms - Variation on a Theme by Haydn and Serenade No. 1 with Ulster Orchestra for Chandos.; Alexander Borodin - Prince Igor and In the Steppes of Central Asia; Glinka - Russlan and Ludmilla Overture; Mussorgsky - Night on Bare Mountain; Rimsky-Korsakov - Capriccio Espagnol and Russian Easter Festival Overture; with Hallé Orchestra for CfP.; Sergey Prokofiev - Lieutenant Kijé Suite with Royal Philharmonic Orchestra for EMI.; Elgar - Organ Sonata and Wand of Youth Suites No. 1 and 2 with Royal Liverpool PO for CfP.
1989	Stanford - Piano Concerto No. 2 and Down Among the Dead Men with Ulster Orchestra and Margaret Fingerhut for Chandos.; Stanford - Symphonies No. 4 and 7 and Irish Rhapsodies No. 3 and 6 with Ulster Orchestra for Chandos.; Bax - Enchanted Summer, Walsinghame and Fatherland with Royal Philharmonic Orchestra and Brighton Festival Chorus for Chandos.; Moeran - In The Mountain Country, Nocturne, Lonely Waters and Whythorne's Shadow with Ulster Orchestra for Chandos; Bliss - Cello Concerto, The Enchantress and Hymn To Apollo with Ulster Orchestra for Chandos.; Grieg - Peer Gynt Suite No. 2, Lyric Suite and Piano Concerto with Ulster Orchestra and Margaret Fingerhut for Chandos.; Ludwig van Beethoven - Egmont Overture; Franz Schubert - Symphony No. 8; Mozart - Symphony No. 40; with Ulster Orchestra for Chandos.; Tchaikovsky - Romeo and Juliet Fantasy with Ulster Orchestra for Chandos.; Dvořák - Violin Concerto in A minor; Bruch - Violin Concerto No. 1; with Royal Liverpool PO and Tasmin Little for CfP.; Rutland Boughton - Symphony No. 3 and Concerto for Oboe with Royal PO for Hyperion.
1990	Stanford -Concert Piece for Organ and Orchestra and Oedipus Rex Prelude with Ulster Orchestra for Chandos.; Granville Bantock - Celtic Symphony, Hebridean Symphony, Witch of Atlas and The Sea Reivers with Royal PO for Hyperion.
1991	Vaughan Williams - Sinfonia antartica, Partita for Double String Orchestra, Oboe Concerto, Fantasia on Greensleeves, Serenade to Music and English Folk Song Suite with Royal Liverpool PO for CfP; Simpson - Symphony No. 2 with Bournemouth SO for Hyperion.; Simpson - Symphony No. 10 with Royal Liverpool PO for Hyperion.; Malcolm Arnold - Symphonies No. 7 and No. 8 with Royal PO for Conifer.; Stanford - Symphonies No. 1 and 2, Irish Rhapsody No. 2 and Clarinet Concerto with Ulster Orchestra for Chandos.; Herbert Howells - Three Dances with Royal Liverpool Philharmonic Orchestra for Hyperion; Howells - Hymnus Paradisi and An English Mass with Royal Liverpool PO and Royal Liverpool Philharmonic Choir for Hyperion.; Sibelius - Violin Concerto; Brahms - Violin Concerto; with Royal Liverpool PO and Tasmin Little for CfP
1992	Vaughan Williams - Pastoral Symphony and Symphony No.4 with Royal Liverpool PO for CfP; Bantock - Pagan Symphony, Fifine at the Fair and Two Heroic Ballads with Royal PO for Hyperion.; Vaughan Williams - Piano Concerto; John Foulds - Dynamic Triptych for Piano and Orchestra; with Royal Philharmonic Orchestra and Howard Shelley for Lyrita.; Howells - Piano Concerto No. 2 and Concerto for Strings with Royal Liverpool PO for Hyperion.; Simpson - Symphony No. 4 with Bournemouth SO for Hyperion.; Torsten Nilsson - Piano Concerto 1, op. 63, with Malmö Symphony Orchestra
1993	Vaughan Williams - London Symphony and Symphony No. 8 with Royal Liverpool PO for CFP; Richard Wagner - Overtures with Royal PO for Intersound.; Gustav Holst - The Planets and St Paul's Suite with Royal PO for Intersound; Arnold - Symphony No. 6, Fantasy on a Theme by John Field, Sweeney Todd, and Tam O'Shanter Overture with Royal PO for Conifer.; Elgar - The Dream of Gerontius with Royal Liverpool PO and Huddersfield Choral Society for CfP.; Eugene Goossens - Symphony No. 2, Concertino for Double String Orchestra, and Fantasy for Nine Wind Instruments with Sydney Symphony Orchestra for ABC Classics
1994	Vaughan Williams - Symphony No. 6 and Symphony No. 9 with RLPO for CfP.; Vaughan Williams - Piano Concerto; Delius - Piano Concerto; Finzi - Eclogue; with RLPO and Piers Lane for CfP; Sergei Rachmaninoff - Symphony No. 2 with Royal PO for Intersound.; Arnold - Symphony No. 2, A Grand Grand Overture, Carnival of Animals, Concerto for 2 Pianos (3 Hands) with Royal PO for Conifer.; Simpson - Symphonies No. 3 and 5 with Royal PO for Hyperion.; Bax - Overture To Adventure, Rogue's Comedy Overture and Work In Progress recorded with Royal PO for Lyrita.
1995	Bantock - The Cyprian Goddess, Helena, and Dante and Beatrice with Royal PO for Hyperion.; John Joubert - Symphony No. 1 with LPO for Lyrita.; Goossens - Divertissement, Variations on a Chinese Theme, The Eternal Rhythm, and Kaleidoscope with Melbourne Symphony Orchestra for ABC Classics
1996	Simpson - Symphonies No. 1 and 8 with Royal PO for Hyperion.; Arnold - Symphony No. 9 and Concertino for Oboe and Strings with Bournemouth SO for Conifer.; Arnold - Symphonies No. 1 and No. 5 with Royal PO for Conifer.; Arnold - Symphonies No. 3 and No. 4 with Royal Liverpool PO for Conifer.; Max Bruch - Scottish Fantasy with Tasmin Little and the Royal Scottish National Orchestra for EMI Eminence; Édouard Lalo - Symphonie espagnole with Tasmin Little and the Royal Scottish National Orchestra for EMI Eminence; Goossens - Symphony No. 1, Oboe Concerto, Tam'O'Shanter, and Concert Piece with West Australian Symphony Orchestra for ABC Classics
1997	Bantock - Sappho and Sapphic Poem with Royal PO and Julian Lloyd Webber for Hyperion.; Mackenzie - Violin Concerto and Pibroch Suite with Royal Scottish National Orchestra for Hyperion.; Dvorak - Lengends and American Suite with West Australian Symphony Orchestra for ABC Classics
1998	Arnold - Symphony For Strings, Philharmonic Overture, Comedy Overture, Water Music, Anniversary Overture, Peterloo Overture and A Flourish For Orchestra with BBC Concert Orchestra for Conifer.; Bax - Concertante for Piano and Orchestra, In Memoriam and Bard of the Dimbovitza with BBC Philharmonic for Chandos.; John McCabe - Concerto for Flute and Symphony No. 4 with BBC Symphony Orchestra for Hyperion.
1999	Edgar Bainton - Symphony No. 2; Hubert Clifford - Symphony; John Gough - Serenade; with BBC PO for Chandos.
2001	Bantock - Thalaba The Destroyer, Processional, Caristiona, Camel Caravan, and Two Preludes with Royal PO for Hyperion.; Wagner various including "The ride of the Walkyries" and "Lohengrin" Royal Philharmonic Orchestra RPO 204408201 Tring International PLC produced by Michael Infante and Steve Deakin-Davies
2002	Benjamin Dale - The Flowing Tide with BBC SO for BBC Radio 3 broadcast (not released on record).
2003	Bax - Seven Symphonies, Tintagel and Rogue's Comedy Overture with BBC PO for Chandos.; Bantock - Song of Songs (Days 2, 3 and 5), Overture to a Greek Tragedy, Pierrot of the Minute and The Wilderness and Solitary Place with Royal PO for Hyperion.
2004	Arnold - Symphony No 6, Beckus the Dandipratt, The Inn of the Sixth Happiness and Flourish for a 21st Birthday with LPO for LPO Records.
2005	Bax - In The Faery Hills, November Woods, The Garden of Fand and Sinfonietta with BBC PO for Chandos.; York Bowen - Violin Concerto and Piano Concerto No. 1 with BBC Concert Orchestra for Dutton.
2006	Bainton - Symphony No. 3; Boughton - Symphony No. 1; with BBC Concert Orchestra for Dutton.; Bax - Northern Ballads No. 1, 2 and 3, Nympholept, Into The Twilight and Red Autumn with BBC PO for Chandos.
2007	Bantock - Omar Khayyám (complete) with Catherine Wyn-Rogers, Toby Spence, Roderick Williams, BBC SO and BBC Symphony Chorus for Chandos.; Bax - The Happy Forest with BBC PO for Chandos.; Bowen - Piano Concertos No. 2 and 3 and Symphonic Fantasia with Michael Dussek (piano) and BBC CO for Dutton.

== Awards and nominations ==
=== ARIA Music Awards ===
The ARIA Music Awards is an annual awards ceremony that recognises excellence, innovation, and achievement across all genres of Australian music. They commenced in 1987.

Year	Nominee / work	Award	Result	Ref.
1999	The Eternal Rhythm (with Melbourne Symphony Orchestra)	Best Classical Album	Nominated	

Preceded by Bryden Thomson	Principal Conductor, Ulster Orchestra; 1985–1989	Succeeded by Yan Pascal Tortelier
Preceded by Stig Westerberg	Chief Conductor, Malmö Symphony Orchestra; 1986–1988	Succeeded by James DePreist
