= Short Mat Players Tour =

Semi-pro short mat bowling organisation

- Sport: Bowls
- Founded: 2011
- Owner: Craig Burgess
- Country: United Kingdom
- Continent: Europe
- Most titles: Gary McNabb (9 titles)
- Sponsors: Taylor Bowls, Drakes Pride

The Short Mat Players Tour (SMPT) is a semi-professional short mat bowling organisation, that runs singles events through Europe. The tour was the first set of events to create a world ranking for short mat bowls. Events are generally set up in round robin format, with players progressing to a knockout round dependent on their position within their own group. In addition to traditional 4-wood singles events, the SMPT have also run pairs, fours, double-rink and two-wood singles competitions.

== Overview ==
The Short Mat Players Tour is a company responsible for events set up by Craig Burgess and Simon Pridham in 2011. They have run events throughout Europe.

The first SMPT event was held in Wey Valley Indoor Bowls Club, Guilford. The event was won by Johnathan Payne of Belgium. The event was followed by events in Sweden, Norway, and Ireland on an annual basis, as well as a United Kingdom open championship. The world masters in 2014, held in Ireland, became the biggest two-day event in short mat bowls history, with an event featuring 252 participants. In addition to these events, the Short Mat Players Tour has run pairs, fours, double rinks and even an event in Cyprus.

In later years, the events would grow to utilise live online results, web entry, and video streaming of certain matches, including knockout rounds, and matches played on a "show mat." Events are split after the group stage, with players being placed in a knockout round dependent on qualification. Those who rank first or second contend the main competition, or Cup; those third and fourth, contend the Plate competition; and those in the bottom two of their round robin group contend the shield, formerly known as the wooden spoon. Those who rank first, second or third win gold, silver and bronze medals, similar to those won in the Olympics.

In the 2018 Norwegian Open; the SMPT partnered with Huldra Film to produce a television standard live stream of the later stages of the event.

The tour's most successful players are Ireland's Mark Beattie and Joseph Beattie who have both won seven singles gold medals each.

At the start of the 2024/25 season a new rule was introduced by the Short Mat Players Tour which prohibits either players/teams first bowl of an end coming to rest fully within the ditch (Dead) area when delivered even if it touched the jack. The offending bowl(s) would be subsequently removed from the mat. This was introduced to stop the possibility of players being able to win ends with their first bowl before their opponent has had a chance to reply. First bowls which touch the jack and stay within the live area when they come to rest are to be chalked as normal and can still be promoted into the ditch (Dead) area by subsequent bowls or the jack.

== Event results ==
=== Current Ranking Singles Events ===
Year	UK Open	Irish Open	Norwegian Open	British Open	English Masters	World Masters
2026-27	Gary McNabb (NIR)	Craig Burgess (ENG)	Craig Burgess (ENG)			
2025-26	Gary McNabb (NIR)	Sean Trainor (NIR)	Matty Worden (ENG)	Chris Coates (ENG)	Alastair McCrea (ENG)	Andrew Leckey (NIR)
2024-25	Alastair McCrea (ENG)	Joseph Beattie (NIR)	Sibe Laureys (BEL)	Cancelled	David McBride (NIR)	Shane Hand (NIR)
2023-24	Alastair McCrea (ENG)	Gary McNabb (NIR)	Peter Roberts (ENG)	Matty Worden (ENG)	Mark Beattie (NIR)	Alex Kley (ENG)
2022-23	Pauline Beattie (NIR)	Joseph Beattie (NIR)	Peter Roberts (ENG)	Gary McNabb (NIR)	Mark Beattie (NIR)	Alex Kley (ENG)
2021-22	Not Played - Covid					
2020-21	Not Played - Covid					
2019-20	Mark Beattie (NIR)	Gary McNabb (NIR)	Benny Sjögren (SWE)	Gary McNabb (NIR)	Alex Kley (ENG)	Not Played - Covid
2018-19	Alex Kley (ENG)	Raymond Stubbs (IRE)	Benny Sjögren (SWE)	Stephen Williams (WAL)	Stephen Williams (WAL)	Alan Paul (NIR)
2017-18	Sam Harvey (WAL)	Alan Paul (NIR)	Stephen Proctor (ENG)	Nigel Nicholls (ENG)	Jack Pye (ENG)	Gary McNabb (NIR)
2016-17	Lawrence Moffat (SCO)	Alan Paul (NIR)	Mark Beattie (NIR)	Not Played	Joseph Beattie (NIR)	Joseph Beattie (NIR)
2015-16	Gary McNabb (NIR)	Dimitri Payne (BEL)	Not Played	Not Played	James Bucknall (ENG)	Gary Burke (NIR)
2014-15	Robert Martin (ENG)	PJ McCrossan (NIR)	Not Played	Not Played	Stephen Williams (WAL)	Mark Beattie (NIR)
2013-14	Joseph Beattie (NIR)	Andrew Leckey (NIR)	Not Played	Not Played	Cecil Dillon (NIR)	Gerry McCabe (IRE)
2012-13	Mark Beattie (NIR)	Not Played	Not Played	Not Played	Joseph Beattie (NIR)	Alan Paul (NIR)
2011-12	Not Played	Not Played	Not Played	Not Played	Jonathan Payne (BEL)	Not Played

=== Past Ranking Singles Events ===
Year	Swedish Masters
2016-17	P.J. Gallagher (IRE)
2015-16	Marcus Almén (SWE)
2014-15	Cecil Dillon (NIR)
2013-14	Joseph Beattie (NIR)
2012-13	Morten-Andre Coll (NOR)

Year	European Masters
2015-16	Joel Häger (SWE)
2014-15	Mark Beattie (NIR)
2013-14	Chris Mann (ENG)
2012-13	Jonathan Payne (BEL)

== Order of Merit ==
The Order of Merit is produced from the six ranking events on the Short Mat Players Tour. The player ranked number 1 at the end of the season is awarded the Short Mat Players Tour Order of Merit sponsored by Henselite Bowls UK.

The short mat players tour events also feature Short Mat Bowls' only world rankings table, with a rolling two year ranking system in place. This is the only world ranking system in place in short mat bowls.

Year	Order of Merit Champion
2025-26	Craig Burgess (ENG)
2024-25	Craig Burgess (ENG)
2023-24	Craig Burgess (ENG)
2022-23	Peter Roberts (ENG)
2019-20	Mark Beattie (NIR)
2018-19	Ed Sawbridge (ENG)
2017-18	Nigel Nicholls (ENG)
2016-17	Dimitri Payne (BEL)
2015-16	Joel Hager (SWE)
2014-15	Mark Beattie (NIR)
2013-14	Cecil Dillon (NIR)
2012-13	Mark Beattie (NIR) / Joel Hager (SWE)

== World Cup ==
Starting in 2015, the Short Mat Players' Tour created a "World Cup", which would contain teams of four, representing each country. The highest ranked four players from each competing country would then represent the team for the world cup. In the first season, in 2015, the event was made up of three groups of three, but was later played in more traditional groups of four. Unlike other world championships, the events feature a "rest of world" team, due to the lack of players from certain countries (such as Germany, India or Italy), but players still need to be placed in the top four of players that are eligible. All games in the world cup are the same as that of the tour, games of singles.

Year	Winning Nation	Runner Up	Final Score	Winning Players
2026	Wales (WAL)	Ireland (IRL)	5 - 1	Stephen Williams, Arwel Morgan, Andrew Hudson, Richard Arran
2025	England (ENG)	Ireland (IRL)	6 - 0	Craig Burgess, Alex Kley, Peter Roberts, Nigel Nicholls
2024	IRE (Ireland)	WAL (Wales)	5 - 1	Don McNamara, Nathan Haire, Gary McNabb, Mark Beattie
2023	IRE (Ireland)	ENG (England)	4 - 2	Gary McNabb, Mark Beattie, Pauline Beattie, Joseph Beattie
2022	IRE (Ireland)	ENG (England)	5 - 1	Glenn Harvey, Mark Beattie, Nathan Haire, P.J Gallagher
2019	IRE (Ireland)	SWE (Sweden)	4.5 - 1.5	Mark Beattie, Joseph Beattie, P.J Gallagher, Nathan Haire
2018	IRE (Ireland)	ENG (England)	5.5 - 0.5	Glenn Harvey, Don McNamara, Nigel Charles, Gary McNabb
2017	IRE (Ireland)	ENG (England)	4 - 2	Mark Beattie, P.J Gallagher, Joseph Beattie, Pauline Beattie
2016	IRE (Ireland)	SWE (Sweden)	5 - 1	P.J Gallagher, Pauline Beattie, Tony Bell, Joseph Beattie
2015	SWE (Sweden)	ENG (England)	4 - 2	Joel Hager, Dick Almen, Jorgan Karlsson, Tommy Dahlgren

== See also ==
- Short mat bowls
- World Bowls Championship
