= Blackball (film) =

2003 British comedy film by Mel Smith

- Theatrical release poster
- Directed by: Mel Smith
- Written by: Tim Firth
- Produced by: James Gay-Rees
- Starring: Paul Kaye; Johnny Vegas; Alice Evans; Vince Vaughn; James Cromwell
- Music by: Stephen Warbeck
- Distributed by: Icon Entertainment International
- Release date: 5 September 2003
- Running time: 97 minutes
- Country: United Kingdom
- Language: English
- Box office: $48,000 (US)

Blackball is a 2003 British sports comedy film based on the game of lawn bowls. The screenplay was written by Tim Firth and the film was directed by Mel Smith. The film features James Cromwell as a master bowls player and Paul Kaye as a naturally talented player who have differing social backgrounds; they are placed together by Vince Vaughn to play for England against Australia. Its fictional plot is based on the bowls player Griff Sanders, who was also referred to as "The Bad Boy of Bowls".

== Background ==
In addition to the main character being modelled after Griff Sanders, the film also spoofs Bjørge Lillelien's infamous commentary from Norway's 2–1 defeat of England at football in 1981. This theme was first riffed by David Baddiel and Frank Skinner on their TV show Fantasy Football League, and the other commentator for the match was Angus Loughran, who played 'Statto' on Fantasy Football.

Blackball was filmed on the Isle of Man and Torquay during October and November 2002. It was released on DVD on 16 February 2004. Various internet games were created in promotion of the movie. Crackerjack, an Australian bowls-based film that pre-dates Blackball, may be the true inspiration for the English version.

== Plot ==
Cliff Starkey (Paul Kaye) is a rebellious young bowls player brought up on "the Lynx Estate" with his friend Trevor (Johnny Vegas) and grandfather Mutley (Bernard Cribbins), a painter and decorator. He dreams of playing for his country but always preferring to play by his own rules, was always disapproved by the local Torquay bowls club. He learns of Australian brothers Carl and Mark Doohan's forthcoming tour of England, and plans to get selected for the national team. Starkey would play through the tournament undefeated, defeating veteran player (and thirteen times champion) Ray Speight (James Cromwell). After winning the competition, and becoming eligible to play for England, Speight, the head of the local lawn bowls association, bans Starkey for fifteen years for writing an expletive on an opponent's scorecard. Angry about the ban, Starkey gatecrashes the celebration party for Speight, who was declared champion; launching a wood across the dinner table at Speight.

Cliff Starkey being presented by Rick Schwartz as the "bad boy of bowls".

Starkey is then picked up by sports agent Rick Schwartz (Vince Vaughn), where Starkey is re branded as the "bad boy of bowls", turning the normally sedate sport into a glitzy, in your face competition. Having defeated many lower key players in unofficial matches, using his variety of trick shots Starkey develops a romance with Kerry Speight (Alice Evans), Ray's daughter. Schwartz proposes a way to get the ban on Starkey lifted, by using this relationship, where the two are spotted by national press, setting Ray Speight to swear at a public address, causing the ban to be removed.

With the sport's popularity at an all-time high, both Speight and Starkey become media celebrities. Schwartz arranges for both Starkey and Speight to take on Australia's unbeaten Doohan brothers in "The Ashes", a one-off tournament in a custom made bowls arena in Torquay. Schwartz; afraid that the relationship with Kerry is affecting Starkey's game; ends his relationship without his consent causing Starkey to fire Schwartz.

Both players have a wide disdain for each other, and are made to use custom bowls for the game. After failing with his woods, and the pressure of the game getting to him, Starkey throws his own woods in a carrier bag into a canal. With both players failing at half time, Trevor and Kerry talk to the pair, and get them to work as a team to make a comeback. Starkey dives into the canal, followed by Ray Speight, who thought Starkey was trying to drown himself, but was in fact rescuing his own bowls. The two return to the arena wet and make a comeback thanks to Speight's experience and Starkey's extravagance, to force the game into extra time (humorously titled the "golden bowl"), much to the disbelief of Carl and Mark Doohan.

The final end, a one bowl play-off, sees a perfect front toucher from Mark Doohan. Speight gives the bowl to Starkey, but stops him from playing his intended fire shot, and instead instructs him to play his own signature large inswinging bowl. The shot works, and the two celebrate having defeated the Australian team, and make amends with Trevor and Mutley.

== Cast ==
- Paul Kaye as Cliff Starkey
- Johnny Vegas as Trevor
- Vince Vaughn as Rick Schwartz
- Alice Evans as Kerry Speight
- Kenneth Cranham as Chairman Collins
- Bernard Cribbins as Mutley
- James Cromwell as Ray Speight
- Imelda Staunton as Bridget
- David Ryall as Giles Wilton
- James Fleet as Alan The Pipe
- Ian McNeice as Hugh The Sideburns

== Reception ==
Critical response to the film was mixed. Critical review aggregator website Rotten Tomatoes scored the film at 41% based on 22 reviews.

David Aldridge of the Radio Times scored the game 1 out of 5, noting that "the laughs here are way off-target." Nev Pierce of the BBC gave the film 2 out of 5 stars. Ed Colley of Future Movies gave the film 3.5/5 saying that "blackball isn't going to single-handedly save British cinema, but it's a likable comedy all the same, even for those wouldn't know a good in-swinger if it came curving towards them at a frightening pace." William Thomas of Empire Online liked the movie stating "A quintessentially British concoction, but a charming one at that. Good performances and a witty script add up to an entertaining, if whimsical, film."
