= List of short mat bowls competitions =

Short Mat Bowls is a generally indoor based bowls sport, played on a carpet. Whilst the game is heavily played throughout the United Kingdom, it is also played throughout Europe, Canada, India, Australia, New Zealand and Japan. National, and international level events are generally held for all disciplines, including singles, pairs, triples and fours.

== International Championships ==
=== World Short Mat Bowls Championships ===
The Short Mat World Championships is held every two years in one of its member states. Whilst this may usually be inside the United Kingdom, teams such as India and Italy also compete; and thus could host the championships. Unlike the British Isles championships above, the world championships allows nations to enter up to two teams to each discipline; as there is no team event. There is also a knockout system in place after the first round-robin round. These tournaments are run by a group known as the World Short Mat Bowls Council.

Year	Venue	Singles Champion	Fours Champions	Pairs Champions	Triples Champions
2026	Skien, Norway				
2024	Belfast, Northern Ireland	Gary McNabb (IRL)	Aled Edwards, Alan Evans, Andrew Evans, Michael John (WAL)	Saul Featherstone, Ryan Knight (ENG)	Jack Pye, AJ Brown, Adam Smith (ENG)
2022 (Played in 2023)	Aberdeen, Scotland	Alex Kley (ENG)	Eddie Curran, Daniel O Kane, Michael Gallagher, John Quinn (IRE)	Jonathon Gladstone, Andrew Hudson (WAL)	Llian Llewelyn, Jamie Stiles, Andrew Jones (WAL)
2020 (Played in 2022 due to Covid)	Herentals, Belgium	Jonathan Payne (BEL)	Stephen Buckett, Mitchell Young, Alastair Mccrea, Ben Pay (ENG)	Jonathan Gladstone, Andrew Hudson (WAL)	Mark Thorpe, Alan Evans, Andrew Evans (WAL)
2018	Stromstad, Sweden	Jonathan Payne (BEL)	Gareth Davies, Alan Jones, Dom Reed, Chris Willies (ENG)	Jonas Häger, Joel Häger (SWE)	Danny Langdon, Ryan Knight, Adam Smith (ENG)
2016	Leigh, England	Raymond Stubbs (IRE)	Derick Wilson, Jonny Wilson, Eddie Campbell, Andrew Leckey (IRE)	Peter Hore, Christopher Willies (ENG)	Derek McCallion, Mark Sproule, Aiden Corrigan (IRE)
2014	Cardiff, Wales	Kevin Conroy (IRE)	Chris Mcwinnie, Jack Edwards, Andrew Jones, Nick Evans (WAL)	Pauline Beattie, Joe Beatie (IRE)	C. Hill, W. Lennox, A. Paul (IRE)
2012	Ballymoney, Northern Ireland	Stephen Williams (WAL)	Kevin Conroy, Fra Dillon, Michael Hand, Billy Taffe (IRE)	Dave Newsome, Ben Render (ENG)	Paddy Hanlon, Gerry McCabe, John Murnaghan (IRE)
2010	Dumfries, Scotland	Stephen Williams (WAL)	Ronnie Stubbs, Gordon Stubbs, Keith Morrison, Raymond Stubbs (IRE)	DJ Wilson, J Wilson (IRE)	Glen Smith, Damian McElroy, Colum McHugh (IRE)
2008	Herentals, Belgium	Colum McHugh (IRE)	Leigh Hall, Trevor Brown, Craig Burgess, Stephen McAllister (ENG)	Babs Morokutti, Jody Frampton (ENG)	Simon Pridham, James Smith, Lee Toleman (ENG)
2006	Hoptond-on-Sea, England	Chris Grocott (ENG)	Paul Hudson, D Hudson, Ben Haddon, Richard Hinkin (WAL)	James Trott, Mark White (ENG)	James Smith, Simon Pridham, Lee Toleman (ENG)

=== Short Mat Players Tour ===
The Short Mat Players Tour (SMPT), is a company responsible of events set up by Craig Burgess and Simon Pridham in 2011. The SMPT are responsible for running events throughout Europe, the first to establish a world ranking system.

==== Current Ranking Singles Events ====
Year	UK Open	Irish Open	Norwegian Open	British Open	English Masters	World Masters
2026-27	Gary McNabb (NIR)	Craig Burgess (ENG)				
2025-26	Gary McNabb (NIR)	Sean Trainor (NIR)	Matty Worden (ENG)	Chris Coates (ENG)	Alastair McCrea (ENG)	Andrew Leckey (NIR)
2024-25	Alastair McCrea (ENG)	Joseph Beattie (NIR)	Sibe Laureys (BEL)	Cancelled	David McBride (NIR)	Shane Hand (NIR)
2023-24	Alastair McCrea (ENG)	Gary McNabb (NIR)	Peter Roberts (ENG)	Matty Worden (ENG)	Mark Beattie (NIR)	Alex Kley (ENG)
2022-23	Pauline Beattie (NIR)	Joseph Beattie (NIR)	Peter Roberts (ENG)	Gary McNabb (NIR)	Mark Beattie (NIR)	Alex Kley (ENG)
2021-22	Not Played - Covid					
2020-21	Not Played - Covid					
2019-20	Mark Beattie (NIR)	Gary McNabb (NIR)	Benny Sjögren (SWE)	Gary McNabb (NIR)	Alex Kley (ENG)	Not Played - Covid
2018-19	Alex Kley (ENG)	Raymond Stubbs (IRE)	Benny Sjögren (SWE)	Stephen Williams (WAL)	Stephen Williams (WAL)	Alan Paul (NIR)
2017-18	Sam Harvey (WAL)	Alan Paul (NIR)	Stephen Proctor (ENG)	Nigel Nicholls (ENG)	Jack Pye (ENG)	Gary McNabb (NIR)
2016-17	Lawrence Moffat (SCO)	Alan Paul (NIR)	Mark Beattie (NIR)	Not Played	Joseph Beattie (NIR)	Joseph Beattie (NIR)
2015-16	Gary McNabb (NIR)	Dimitri Payne (BEL)	Not Played	Not Played	James Bucknall (ENG)	Gary Burke (NIR)
2014-15	Robert Martin (ENG)	PJ McCrossan (NIR)	Not Played	Not Played	Stephen Williams (WAL)	Mark Beattie (NIR)
2013-14	Joseph Beattie (NIR)	Andrew Leckey (NIR)	Not Played	Not Played	Cecil Dillon (NIR)	Gerry McCabe (IRE)
2012-13	Mark Beattie (NIR)	Not Played	Not Played	Not Played	Joseph Beattie (NIR)	Alan Paul (NIR)
2011-12	Not Played	Not Played	Not Played	Not Played	Jonathan Payne (BEL)	Not Played

==== Past Ranking Singles Events ====
Year	Swedish Masters
2016-17	P.J. Gallagher (IRE)
2015-16	Marcus Almén (SWE)
2014-15	Cecil Dillon (NIR)
2013-14	Joseph Beattie (NIR)
2012-13	Morten-Andre Coll (NOR)

Year	European Masters
2015-16	Joel Häger (SWE)
2014-15	Mark Beattie (NIR)
2013-14	Chris Mann (ENG)
2012-13	Jonathan Payne (BEL)

==== Current Team Events ====
Year	World Fours Masters	World Pairs Masters	SMPT World Cup
2026-27			Wales (WAL)
2025-26	Pauline Beattie, Joe Beattie, Gary Moore, Mark Beattie (NIR)	Andrew Leckey (NIR) Chris Mcwhinnie (WAL)	England (ENG)
2024-25	Ben Pay, Alastair McCrea (ENG) Gary McNabb, Martin McNicholl (NIR)	Gary McNabb, Martin McNicholl (NIR)	Ireland (NIR)
2023-24	Pauline Beattie, Joe Beattie, Gary Moore, Mark Beattie (NIR)	James Shaw, Ian Hobson (NIR)	Ireland (NIR)
2022-23	Dick Almen, Eroll Morina (SWE) John Lax, James Trott (ENG)	Stephen Buckett, Ben Pay (ENG)	Ireland (NIR)
2021-22	Not Played - Covid		
2020-21	Not Played - Covid		
2019-20	Ben Pay, Stephen Buckett, Alastair McCrea, Matty Worden (ENG)	James Shaw, Ian Hobson (NIR)	Ireland (NIR)
2018-19	Simon Pidham, Mikey Ivings, Craig Burgess, James Trott (ENG)	Alex Kley, Thomas Perris (ENG)	Ireland (NIR)
2017-18	Gethin Edwards, Aled Edwards, Cennydd Howell, Dafydd Howell (WAL)	Pauline Beattie, Joe Beattie (NIR)	Ireland (NIR)
2016-17	Ollie Hipkiss, Stephen Holdsworth, Danny Langdon, Ryan Knight (ENG)	Liam Smith, Peter Roberts (ENG)	Ireland (NIR)
2015-16	Michael Ivings, Paul Pomeroy, James Trott, James Smith (ENG)	Lisa Douglas, Jal Richardson (NIR)	Sweden (SWE)
2014-15	Andy Morrison, Jal Richardson, William Morrison, Lisa Douglas (NIR)	Michael Ivings, James Smith (ENG)	Not Played
2013-14	Not Played	William Morrison, Jal Richardson (NIR)	Not Played

=== British Isles Championships ===
Each year, winners of the national championships of each of the home nations (Although Ireland are usually represented as one country), along with a team selected by their governing body to compete in the British Isles Championships. The Isle of Man competed with a full team from 2005 - 2011. The winner is traditionally decided in a round-robin format, with the winner being the team with the most points, and shot difference.

The team competition for the British Isles championship is sixteen against sixteen; known as rinks. Each team deploys four teams of four over four mats, and the winning team is the one with the most combined shots over every mat. It is possible for players in the 'individual' disciplines, to also play in the team event. In this way, it is possible for players to win two British Isles titles in one season.

Current Champions:

Year	Venue	Singles Champion	Fours Champions *	Pairs Champions *	Triples Champions *	Premier Team Champion *
2024/25	Auchinleck, Scotland	Colum McHugh (IRE)	Steve Stanton, Jack Knight, Ben Riley & Emily Thomas (ENG)	Gary Best & Matty Worden (ENG)	David Crawford, Eddie Curran & John Quinn (IRE)	Ireland (IRE)
2023/24	Prestatyn, Wales	Alex Kley (ENG)	Adam Easthope, John Pitcher, Craig Strong & Ross Dunkley (ENG)	Saul Featherstone & Ryan Knight (ENG)	Gordon Stubbs, Ronni Stubbs & Raymond Stubbs (IRE)	Ireland (IRE)
2022/23	Belfast, Northern Ireland	Alex Kley (ENG)	Gerard McCloskey, Nathan Haire, Nick Haire & Terry Crawford (IRE)	Gordon Stubbs & Raymond Stubbs (IRE)	Craig Strong, Jon Pitcher & Ross Dunkley (ENG)	Ireland (IRE)
2021/22	Not Played - Covid					
2020/21	Scarborough, England (Held in Jan 2022)	Jac Edwards (WAL)	Stuart Hiddlestone, Kevin Peacock, Murray Masson & Sandy McDonald (SCO)	Jonathan Gladstone & Andrew Hudson (WAL)	Lawrence Moffat, Bronagh Toleman & Lee Toleman (ENG)	Ireland (IRE)
2019/20	Aberdeen, Scotland	Andrew Steele (IRE)	Lisa Richardson, Gary Culbert, Jal Richardson & Andrew Leckey (IRE)	Andrew Cloghlin & Stephen Willams (WAL)	John Murnaghan, Kieran Trainor & Gerry McCabe (IRE)	Ireland (IRE)
2018/19	Camarthen, Wales	James Trott (ENG)	Liam McHugh, Keith McCullagh, Paddy Hanlon & Colum McHugh (IRE)	Andrew Evans & Sean Hughes (WAL)	Ronnie Stubbs, Gordon Stubbs & Raymond Stubbs (IRE)	Ireland (IRE)
2017/18	Belfast, Northern Ireland	Andrew Leckey (IRE)	Ben Jackson, Chris McWhinnie, Andrew Jones & Nick Evans (WAL)	Sean Conroy & Kevin Conroy (IRE)	Gary Moore, Mark Beattie & PJ McCrossan (IRE)	Ireland (IRE)
2016/17	Bromsgrove, England	Michael John (WAL)	Simon White, Keith Lackford, Stephen Proctor & Martin Walker (ENG)	Ben Render, Danny Langdon (ENG)	Paul Reid, Gordon Stubbs & Raymond Stubbs (IRE)	Ireland (IRE)
2015/16	Aberdeen, Scotland	Andrew Jones (WAL)	Brendan McCabe, John Murnaghan, Gerry McCabe & Paddy Hanlon (IRE)	Sean Conroy & Kevin Conroy (IRE)	David Crawford, Nixon Alexander & Eddie Curran (IRE)	Ireland (IRE)
2014/15	Llanelli, Wales	Ryan O'Neill (IRE)	Leigh Hall, Chris Weston, Ed Sawbridge & AJ Brown (ENG)	Allan Williams & Alan Jones (ENG)	Bronagh Toleman, James Smith & Lee Toleman (ENG)	Ireland (IRE)
2013/14	Coleraine, Northern Ireland	Luke Haddon (WAL)	Samuel McMath, Tommy Mullan, Barry Kane & Uel McKeeman (IRE)	Alan Eddie & Jimmy Broatch (SCO)	David Crawford, Eddie Curran & John Quinn (IRE)	Ireland (IRE)
2012/13	Hopton-on-Sea, England	Andrew Evans (WAL)	Colin Hogg, Glen Smith, Alan Paul & Mark Wilson (IRE)	Leigh Harrison & Ryan O'Neill (IRE)	Ed Sawbridge, Chris Weston & Chris Hopkins (ENG)	Ireland (IRE)
2011/12	Dumfries, Scotland	Dom Reed (ENG)	Aled Humphries & Nick Evans (WAL)	Nick Tideswell, Alan Jones & Darren Beardmore (ENG)	Tom Morrison, William Morrison, Andrew Morrison & David Morrison (IRE)	England (ENG)
2010/11	Douglas, Isle of Man	Alan Paul (IRE)	Mikey Ivings & Lee Toleman (ENG)	Karen O'Neill, Leigh Harrison & Ryan O'Neill (IRE)	Warwick France, Chris Shakeshaft, Alan Williams & Chris Williams (ENG)	Ireland (IRE)

=== International Short Mat Open ===
The International Open was the biggest open competition in Short Mat Bowls when it first started in 2010. The competition was organised by Craig Burgess and Barry Hedges of Essex; both of the trophies awarded are in memory of their fathers, John Burgess and David Hedges. The inaugural event was held at Kempston Indoor Bowls Club, Bedford, England, and had the biggest gathering of short mat bowls talent from all over Europe including England, Ireland, Wales, Scotland, Belgium and Sweden. In subsequent years, the John Burgess Trophy became a pairs event instead of the original triples format. The event finished in 2013.

Year	Venue	John Burgess Trophy	David Hedges Trophy
2013	Havering Indoor Bowls Club, Essex	Allan Williams & James Trott (ENG)	Peter Fautley, Tony Elham, Steve Killington & Anthony Fautley (ENG)
2012	Havering Indoor Bowls Club, Essex	Joseph Newsome & Ben Render (ENG)	Sarah Beynon, Arwel Morgan, Tom Jones & Luke Haddon (WAL)
2011	Havering Indoor Bowls Club, Essex	Jack Shepherd & Chris Willies (ENG)	Steve Proctor, Andrew Beard, Gareth Stanway & Grant Soller (ENG)
2010	Kempston Indoor Bowls Club, Bedford	Marty Trainor, Alan Paul & Kevin Conroy (IRE)	Liam McHugh, Keith McCullagh, Damian McElroy & Colum McHugh (IRE)

== Notable National Competitions ==
=== England ===
==== St Georges Cup ====
The St Georges Cup began in 2011, with 32 players from the North of England against 32 players from the South of England in a Ryder Cup-style event.

Year	Venue	Winners	Final score
2025-26	Solihull Indoor Bowls Club	North of England	48 - 24
2024-25	Solihull Indoor Bowls Club	South of England	30 - 38
2023-24	Solihull Indoor Bowls Club	South of England	33 - 35
2022-23	Solihull Indoor Bowls Club	South of England	29 - 39
2021-22	Solihull Indoor Bowls Club	North of England	36 - 32
2020-21	Not Played - Covid		
2019-20	Not Played - Covid		
2018-19	Tamworth Indoor Bowls Club	South of England	28.5 - 39.5
2017-18	Bromsgrove Indoor Bowls Club	North of England	37 - 31
2016-17	Bromsgrove Indoor Bowls Club	North of England	39 - 29
2015-16	Solihull Indoor Bowls Club	South of England	25 - 43
2014-15	Bromsgrove Indoor Bowls Club	South of England	20.5 - 43.5
2013-14	Bromsgrove Indoor Bowls Club	Draw	32 - 32
2012-13	Tamworth Indoor Bowls Club	South of England	26 - 38
2011-12	Wey Valley Indoor Bowls Club, Guildford	South of England	20.5 - 43.5
2010-11	Erdington Indoor Bowls Club, Birmingham	South of England	21 - 35

==== English Inter County Championship ====
The ESMBA organise an inter-county championship for teams of 20 players from each county. Most counties will enter two teams, a first 'premier' team, and an 'A team'. Winners of the premier competition are invited to the Top County competition, where the winners of the English ICC play the Welsh & Irish winners. Teams are made up of two teams from each discipline (Singles, pairs, triples & fours).

Year	Premier Championship	A Team Championship	Premier Consolation	A Team Consolation
2019	West Midlands	West Midlands	Somerset	Dorset
2018	West Midlands	Devon	Somerset	Dorset
2017	West Midlands	North Yorkshire	Dorset	Stockport
2016	Norfolk	Kent	Northamptonshire	Shropshire
2015	Hampshire	Devon	Dorset	Norfolk
2014	Cheshire	Kent	Northamptonshire	Hampshire
2013	Cheshire	Kent	Dorset	Hampshire
2012	Cheshire	Devon	Cornwall	Cornwall
2011	Cheshire	Kent	Hampshire	Cornwall
2010	Cheshire	West Midlands	West Sussex	Cheshire
2009	Cheshire	West Sussex	West Midlands	Cornwall
2008	Cheshire	West Sussex	West Midlands	Hampshire
2007	Cheshire	Kent	Shropshire	Cornwall
2006	Staffordshire	Kent	Cheshire	Hertfordshire
2005	Kent	West Sussex	Warwickshire	Gloucestershire
2004	West Midlands	Herefordshire	Cheshire	Gloucestershire
2003	Kent	West Sussex	West Sussex	Staffordshire
2002	Kent	Kent	Shropshire	London
2001	Kent	West Midlands	Norfolk	Northamptonshire
2000	West Midlands	Devon	Worcestershire	Northamptonshire
1999	Kent	Essex	Hampshire	Hampshire
1998	Kent	Essex	Shropshire	Lancashire
1997	Staffordshire	Somerset	Shropshire	Northamptonshire
1996	Norfolk	Staffordshire	Cornwall	Cheshire
1995	Kent	Cheshire	West Midlands
1994	West Midlands	West Midlands
1993	Staffordshire
