= Stephen Williams (bowler) =

Welsh short mat bowls player (born 1973)

Personal information
- Nationality: Wales
- Born: 3 August 1973 (age 51)

Sport
- Sport: Short mat bowls

Achievements and titles
- World finals: 4 Championships (2002, 2004, 2010, 2012)

Stephen Williams (born 3 August 1973) is a Welsh short mat bowls player, and four time singles world champion. Williams won the championship in consecutive tournaments in 2002, and 2004, and then again in 2010 and 2012. Williams has also won the world triples championship in 1994. Williams is also a multiple time national champion; and British Isles champion.

Williams is also a three-time singles winner of events at the Short mat players tour, first winning the 2015 English Masters, defeating Paul Bax 12–7 in the final and also winning the 2019 British Open, defeating Devon's Benny Bass in the final 10–9. Williams would win the very next event, the 2019 English Masters, with a 12–10 win in the final over Sean Hughes.

Williams has also won the Welsh Grand Prix 2 Bowl Pairs, in 2018, with partner Johnathan Payne, having been runner up the year before.

In 2012, Williams defeated Alex Marshall in the "champion of champion" series, as the reigning world champion. He defeated Marshall in a 7 end match, 6–4.
