= Hastings Open Bowls Tournament =

English sporting event

The first Hastings Open Bowls Tournament was held in the summer of 1911 at the Central Cricket Ground (which is where today the Priory Meadow Shopping Centre stands) in Queens Road under the title of 'The Hastings & St Leonards Open Bowls and Quoits Tournament'. It was an annual three-day event and open to bona fide gentlemen amateur bowlers. The game of quoits gradually lost popularity and was subsequently discontinued as part of the competition.

== Notable events ==
On Saturday 7 September 1912, the local newspaper The Hastings Observer published a change in the rules for the singles and pairs:

"Last year singles competition was 15 points up and the nearest wood to count. This year both competitions will be 21 ends not points up and only woods within three feet of the jack to count. There will be an extra end in the case of a tie. In both competitions the players will have two bowls each."

An extract of the 1925 Tournament Committee's leaves one in no doubt that the tournament was "acknowledged to be the largest and most successful Open Bowling Tournament in the United Kingdom."

The tournament venue was later changed to its present location in White Rock Gardens where there were eight greens, of which only four remain today. The Main Bowls Pavilion in the gardens, used as the tournament's control centre, was completely destroyed by fire in 1968 and subsequently rebuilt later in the same year.

Between October 1999 and April 2000 the Pavilion was completely refurbished in a joint effort by members of White Rock and Rosemount bowls clubs and Hastings Borough Council. Additional toilet facilities, men's and ladies' changing rooms, a kitchen, and a bar were added. The total cost of the work amounted to about £18,000 and involved approximately 3,000 hours of voluntary work by the bowlers. The building was formally re-opened on 1 May 2000. It is now managed by the Main Bowls Pavilion Company (PAVCO) which is made up from representatives from each of the above clubs.

Up until 1937 only singles, pairs and rinks were played but in that year triples were introduced to take the place of rinks. Rinks were subsequently re-introduced, in addition to the other three competitions, in 1960. The total number of bowlers participating in 1937 amounted to a near record of 1843 being 629 singles, 295 pairs and 208 triples. This compared favourably with average annual entries between 1930 and 1936 of 1724. The duration of the tournament had by this time been extended to two weeks.

Due to the falling number of competitors, the tournament was reduced to one week in 2010. The men's fours and triples along with the ladies' triples were discontinued and a mixed triples was introduced which is vied for along with the men's singles and pairs and the ladies' singles and pairs.

The 2018 tournament, which ran for a week in August that year, commemorated the World War I armistice. The total prize fund was £2,150, and the number of entrants increased over the preceding years' event.

== Numbers ==
Average entries were:

- 1940s: 1688
- 1950s: 1548
- 1960s: 1724
- 1970s: 1415
- 1980s: 1136
- 1990s: 1117

Since the turn of the millennium entries have been:

For the year:

- 2000: 716
- 2001: 676
- 2002: 539
- 2003: 747
- 2004: 733
- 2005: 696
- 2006: 526

== Prize money ==
Total prize money in 1923 amounted to 58 Guineas for the singles, 32 guineas for the pairs and 32 Guineas for the Rinks. The total prize money as of 2018 is c. £2000.

== Amalgamation ==
With the significant drop in entries at the start of the millennium, in common with other Open Tournaments, it was decided to amalgamate the Hastings Ladies' and Men's Opens. To this end, a General Meeting was held on 30 January 2003 to give effect to these proposals and accordingly, a combined tournament was formed for both ladies and men called the "Hastings Open Bowls Tournament." A new Committee was formed made up of ladies and men and a new constitution adopted.

Hastings is the first town in East Sussex to stage a mixed open tournament.
