= Short mat bowls =

Indoor sport

- A game of short mat bowls being played
- Highest governing body: World Short Mat Bowls Council
- First played: 1900s

Characteristics
- Contact: No
- Team members: Singles and team
- Mixed-sex: Yes
- Type: Indoor
- Equipment: Bowls, carpet
- Glossary: Glossary of bowls terms

Presence
- Country or region: Europe, India
- Olympic: No
- World Championships: World Championships
- Paralympic: No
- World Games: No

Short mat bowls is an indoor sport in which players attempt to score points by rolling a heavy ball along a fairly flat surface, to gain as many shots as possible by getting their bowls nearer to the jack than their opponents, and so outscore them. The game is a modern variation on lawn bowls, from which it is derived.

== Venues ==
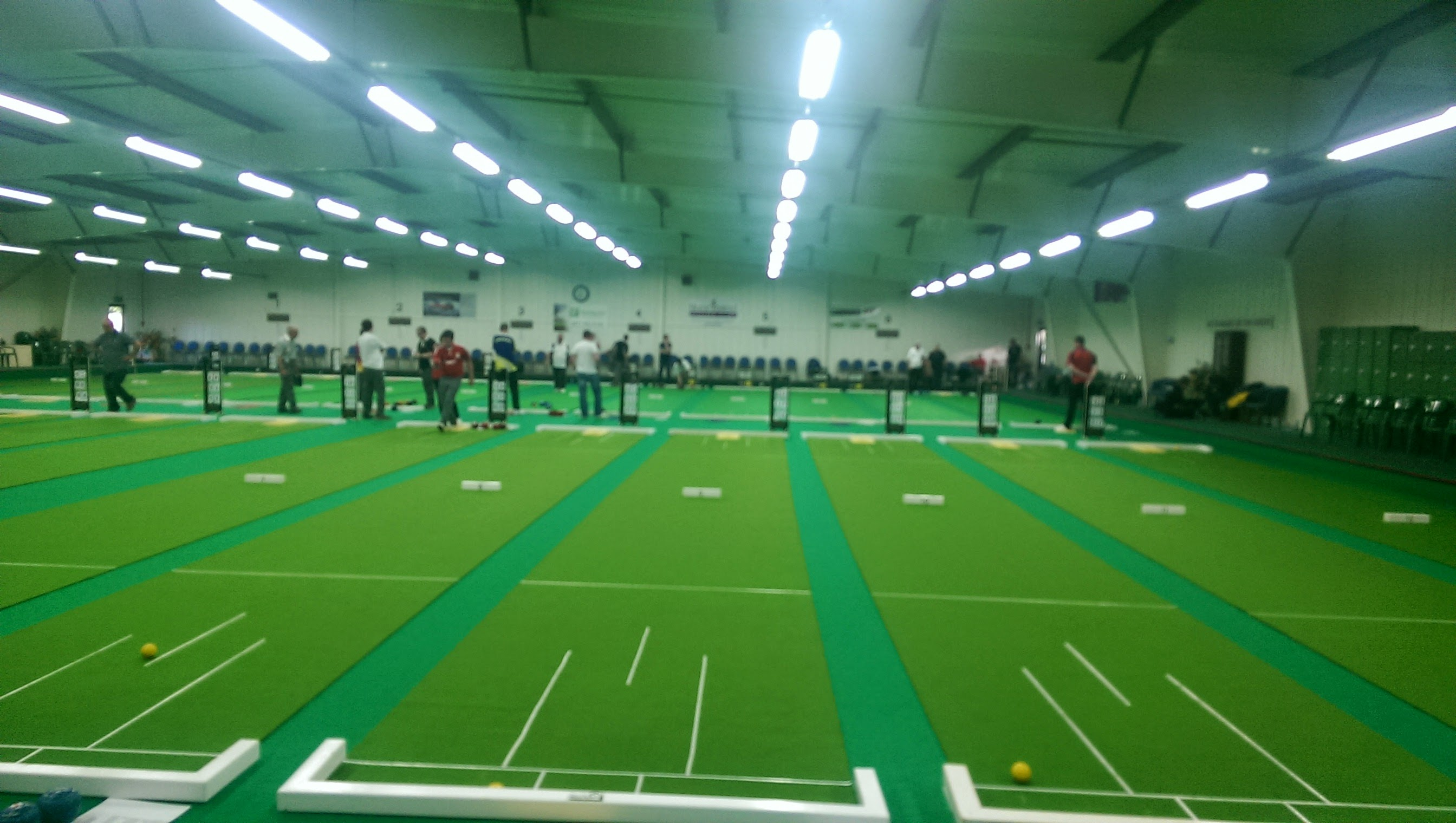
The 2014 UK Open (pictured) was played with mats on top of a traditional indoor bowling rink.

Short mat bowls is played indoors, so it is an all-year sport that is not affected by weather conditions. Because the equipment is transportable and easy to set up, it is particularly appropriate for locations that are also used for other purposes such as village halls, schools, and sports and social clubs; it is even played on North Sea oil rigs.

== Equipment ==
The ESMBA specify a rink mat length of 40–45 ft (12–14 m) with a width of 6 ft (1.8 m). The mat is foam or rubber-backed, and has the required lines permanently marked. A wooden fender is placed at both ends to simulate the 'ditch' and keep the bowls from rolling off the mat. A wooden block sits in the centre of the mat. players have to avoid their bowl contacting the block on their way down the mat. The fine shape of each bowl imposes a 'bias' which causes the bowl to follow a curved route. The 'jack' is the target that sits near the end of the mat.

As opposed to its counterparts, short mat uses a super-heavyweight jack that weighs approximately 900 g (32 oz), whereas, indoor bowls use 382–453 g (13.5–16.0 oz), and long mat (Grass) between 225–285 g (7.9–10.1 oz)

=== Length of play ===
As with most variants of bowls a short mat can have a variable length of play. During club matches where time is at a premium, it is usual for a specific time of play to be selected so that change-overs are within a short period.

In serious competition matches, such as organised in UK and Europe by SMPT (Short-mat Players Tour), a specific number of 'ends' are played.

In traditional games such as crown green bowls and indoor bowls, winning lead players have the opportunity to place the jack on a central line to the length they wish to play to in the next end. In short mat bowls; the game has been simplified, to allowing the winning skip to simply place the jack on a line determining a preferred the length .

== How the game is played ==
Short mat bowls is very similar to lawn bowls in that the object is for each player, or team, to take turns rolling bowls (woods) down a mat in an attempt to finally, getting as many of the woods as close as possible and closer to the target the 'jack' than their opponent. The main difference is in the size of the playing area and the presence of the block midway down the rink mat. The presence of the block is to reduce an attempt of players knocking their opponents' woods away from the existing position. Players are encouraged to use the natural bias of the bowls to manoeuvre around the block and any other bowls or indeed, promote an existing bowl. Any woods that touch the block, or land in the ditch area are dead and are removed before the next wood is sent. A bowl which has touched the jack en route to the ditch, remains 'alive' and will count in the scoring. The skill in playing short mat bowls comes from the bias of the wood and the skill of 'delivering a bowl to a position where it either counts in the score or is used as a defender, blocking a route to change positions. Both the performance of the rink mat and the floor surface can vary but preference is for a neutral mats from venue to venues. A general description of different bowls games, including short mat bowls, is maintained at bowls.org.uk.

== History ==
The origin of the short mat bowls game is uncertain, but one story is that it was first played in Wales by two South Africans who came to work in the area. They had played bowls outdoors in South Africa and, perhaps due to the poor climate and the long close season in Wales, they began to play a simulation of the outdoor game on a strip of carpet in a church hall. Some time later, they moved to Northern Ireland and took the new game with them. Rules and conditions of play were drawn up and the game soon became well established in the Province. It was introduced into England by Irish expatriates, but development was slow until the 1980s when its potential as a low cost sport for people of all ages was realised.

The English Short Mat Bowling Association (ESMBA) was formed in 1984, and is now the governing body of the sport in England. The sport is administered in England at two levels, the ESMBA oversee administration of the National Championships and Inter County Championships in addition to running the National Squad. At a more local level, 37 County Associations arrange a series of League, One Day and Knockout competitions within their own geographical area.

In 2009, the ESMBA launched a new National Club Championship event, the event featuring teams competing in all-four disciplines (Singles, Pairs, Triples & Fours), with all members being from the same club team. The Final's Day was played at Rugby Thornfield with Kirby Bedon of Norfolk beating Warren Heath of Essex in the final. In 2010, Donnington of Cambridgeshire were the winners followed by Bob Carter of Norfolk in 2011. In 2012, the title was won by a side outside East Anglia for the first time when Cheshire's Morley Green lifted the title. The latest figures show 18,337 ESMBA registered members for the 2016/17 season. The ESMBA rules of the game are followed by the affiliated clubs and also by most others. Most clubs arrange competitions among their own members as well as allowing time for those not wishing to take part in competitions to enjoy informal bowling.

== See also ==
- List of short mat bowls competitions
