= Glossary of bowls terms =

This page is a glossary of bowls terminology.

This page explains commonly used terms in the sport of bowls, which includes variations of outdoor bowls also known as Lawn Bowls, Crown Green Bowls, Indoor Bowls and Carpet Bowls.

== 1–9 ==
100 Up

A game of bowls where the object is to reach a score of 100 shots. Usually used in games based on a proportional scoring system.

2 Metre mark

The furthermost position that the jack can be placed following the lead bowler rolling the jack at the start of an end. If the jack is rolled past this point, and remains within the rink boundaries, the jack is spotted on the designated mark, positioned 2 metres back from the ditch .

21 Up

A game of bowls where the object is to be the first to reach a score of 21 shots.

25 Up

A game of bowls where the object is to be the first to reach a score of 25 shots.

8 Badge

In some pennant games, the controlling body awards an 8 badge to members of a fours rink where a full count of eight shots is achieved in a single end.

== A ==
absolute

the bowl closest to the jack, often in relation to other bowls surrounding the head, also referred to as the "absolute shot"

aero

name of an Australian-based bowls manufacturer.

artificial

bowls surface made of man made materials, as compared to grass greens.

== B ==
back bowl

a bowl place behind the head, positioned so that if the opposition trails the jack from its current position towards the back of the rink, the back bowl may become shot or reduce the number of shots that the opposition may have if moved to this part of the rink.

back ditch

The ditch at the end of the green which is directly behind a player when they stand on the mat.

backhand

For a right handed player, delivering a bowl to the left hand side of the rink, with the bias facing the centre line of the rink. For a left handed player, delivering a bowl to the right hand side of the rink, with the bias facing the centre line of the rink.

bank

the area on the outer edge of the green, beyond the ditch.

bankers

reserve players who have not been selected to play in a competitive game. On competition days, those players not selected to play may have a practice game at the same time that the competition is in progress. In the past the term also described those players watching and critiquing the game from the bank, and an obsolete meaning, spelt "banckers", referred to skilful bowlers who lured unsuspecting amateurs to play them for money or other prizes In Australia, the origin of the name may also stem from a sponsorship of a bank who provided prizes or other financial support to clubs.

bent

A type of grass (botanical name: agrostis stolonifera) used for the construction of lawn bowls greens. Known for its carpet like cover, and the ability to successfully cultivate in a wide variety of climates.

bias

the natural curve built into a bowl, creating an arc from the point of releasing the bowl to the point it stops.

bigs

a call made when determining which player will deliver the first bowl at the start of a game. One player will roll a bowl end over end, and calling "bigs" refers to the bowl stopping with the side where the larger rings are facing upward. See also smalls.

blocker

A bowl positioned on the green such that it would stop an opponents bowl from reaching a defined point, usually the jack, based on its regular line.

bowl
: the biased ball used in the game of bowls. The side of the bowl that is biased can be identified by the smaller engraved concentric rings seen, compared to the outer (non biased) side of the bowl.
bowling arm

a device that enables players, who have an inability to bend as part of a standard delivery action, to bowl in an upright position. Bowling arms are normally licensed or approved by the controlling body and also require the bowler to have a medical certificate to verify the need for use.

bowls

official name of the sport, as defined by World Bowls.

bowls cloth

: a piece of cloth used by bowlers to cleant and/or polish a bowl during a game. They are made of various materials, with the most popular being cotton cloth, or a chamois for wet conditions.

boundary peg

a marker placed on the bank to indicate the outside boundary of a rink. If a bowl finishes completely outside the boundary it is a dead bowl. If the jack is rolled outside the boundary when first delivered, it is returned to the mat for the opposition player to roll the jack. If the jack is moved outside the boundary after being placed on the centre line, the end is declared a dead end and is replayed, unless the competition has a local rule to spot the jack in such situations.

break

during a game, a planned stop in play, usually an afternoon tea break. In some competitions, local regulations allow the managers to determine if a break is taken or if the teams play straight through to completion.

== C ==
callipers

a piece of equipment used by an umpire or a player, to judge the relative distance between the jack and one or more bowls, at the conclusion of an end, which will determine the number of shots held by a player or team.

carpet bowls

(a.k.a. (indoor bowls)) a variation of outdoor bowls, played on a rectangular piece of carpet that is laid out on the floor, and can be rolled up a stored away between games. Carpet bowls have different types of bowls, which are smaller than an outdoor bowl, and the rules that govern play are unique to this particular form of the game.

centre line

represents the midpoint of a rink between the boundary pegs. Some greens will have centre lines drawn on the rink from the 2 metre mark towards the middle of the green at both ends, extending for a few metres. The jack is aligned with the centre line after being rolled by a player at the start of an end.

chalk

used to indicate a bowl that has touched the jack as part of its initial delivery during an end. A player in charge of the head will use a piece of chalk, or chalk spray, to place a mark, which must be done before the next bowl comes to a rest, and must be removed before the bowl is delivered in the next end.

change of ends

once all bowls have been delivered by players standing at the mat end of the rink, they will move to the other end of the rink. See also crossover.

chasing

following your own bowl down the green after delivery. If permitted by the rules of the competition, the player is expected to be positioned behind the head on or before the bowl comes to rest. See also riding.

chock

a piece of material placed under a bowl to hold it in place on the green. When a measure is called for, and a bowl is leaning on another bowl, it is sometimes necessary to chock the bowl so that one bowl can be removed without changing the position of the other. Materials used include rubber and foam wedges, or short lengths of rope.

composite

short hand term describing the material used to manufacture a bowl. Most modern bowls are made of a hardened composite plastic material. Before composite plastic was used, bowls were made from a hardwood material, usually lignum vitae. See also wood.

controlling body

the organisation with immediate control over the conditions of play of any given bowls competition.

claw grip

a method of holding the bowl in your hand, where the running surface of the bowl sits along the fingers of the hand, with the thumb held at or near the top of the bowl as a balancing mechanism. cradle grip.

count

the number of shots received by a player or team at the conclusion of an end.

counter

a bowl that is closer to the jack than an opponents nearest bowl is considered a "counter". See also count.

crack an egg

a description of the weight required to complete an ideal shot. The objective is to play the bowl such that it gently hits the target and moves it slightly, or has a flow on impact to move a bowl or jack that is touching the target.

cradle grip

a method of holding the bowl in your hand, where the running surface of the bowl sits cradled between the fingers of the hand, and the palm, with the thumb positioned alongside the fingers in a cupping style. See also claw grip.

crossover

in a team game, when all players at the mat end of the rink have delivered their bowls, they will move to the opposite end of the rink, and the player in charge of the head, usually the skip, crosses over to the mat end to deliver their bowls.

crown green

describes a variation of outdoor bowls, which is played on greens that have an undulating surface, with a peak in the middle. Play also differs as there are no rink boundaries, and the jack also has a bias. See Crown Green Bowls.

crystal mark

refers to the official laws of the Sport of Bowls.

== D ==
dead bowl

after a bowl has been delivered and comes to rest, if it finishes in the ditch, or outside the rink boundary, it is considered a dead bowl, and is removed from play. However, if the bowl has touched the jack, it remains a live bowl even if in the ditch, as long as it is within the boundary of the rink.

dead draw

a bowl that becomes the shot bowl (closest to the jack) without touching any other bowl during its delivery.

dead end

a partially completed end that has to be replayed, by reason of the jack going outside the rink or green boundaries, or an umpire ruling that due to an action, the head cannot be returned to its previous state. See also re-spot.

dead green

See slow green.

declare the head

an expression advising that the last player on the mat is not going to deliver his last bowl. It is called for if the player or team is holding shot, or that there is significant danger of changing the head to the detriment of the player/team if the last bowl were the change the current situation.

delivery

the action performed by a player to propel the bowl from the mat end of the rink to the head at the other end of the rink .

discs

in team based competitions, players on the same team will apply a unique ring shaped decal to both sides of the bowl so that they are easily distinguishable from the opposition's bowls. See also rings.

disturb the head

play a bowl with sufficient weight to alter the position of bowls and/or the jack in the head. A request of the skip called for usually when the team is not holding shot, or is blocked from playing a preferred shot by bowls in the way of the objective (usually the jack).

ditch

the area surrounding a green, usually identifiable as a shallow trench at the edges of the green. Some ditches are a natural surround formed by mounds and trenches of soil, whilst other greens have a man made ditch comprising wooden formwork, plinth, rubber sheets, and filled with a sand or artificial materials. Also see front ditch and back ditch

ditch rink

a rink that runs parallel to the ditch along its length.

ditch weight

to play a bowl with sufficient weight to reach the ditch at the other end of the rink, or the ditch nearest the head in Crown Green bowls.

division

in pennant games, associations may create tiered competition made up of separate divisions of teams. Often there are multiple sections to form part of a division. Section winners then play against other section winners in that division to determine the overall division champion.

down

expression to confirm if your opponent has one or more bowls closest to the jack. If a marker is providing this information in a singles game, the marker can also indicate this status by holding a clenched fist downwards towards the ground.

drakes pride

name of an England-based bowls manufacturer.

draw

*# (bowl) a bowl delivered to finishes closest to the jack, without the need to move or touch other bowls in the head.

  1. (competition) a schedule of matches showing the teams or players and their opponents in each round of the competition.
drawn end

at the conclusion of an end if the closest bowl of each player or team is judged to be the same distance away from the jack, no score is recorded, but the end counts for games that are based on playing a number of ends.

drive

a bowl delivered with the maximum force that a player can exert, the aim being to kill the end, disturb the head, or hit opposition bowls out of the head.

dumping

a bowl delivered from above the green so that it bounces on the turf when it first leaves the hand. Dumping a bowl is an indication of poor technique, or may indicate the player has an injury or disability that does not enable the bowl to be let go of parallel to the ground.

== E ==
east-west

Describes the direction of play for the rink s, which run in parallel with each other on any given day. Most bowling rinks are built to accommodate play alternately in a north–south, or east–west direction. Green keepers and Greens Directors will alter the direction of play to assist in managing the quality of the greens over a season. Most competitions play north–south, to avoid players looking directly into the sun. East-west play is often used for social games. This does not apply to the Crown Green game of bowls which utilises the entire green surface and is not divided into rinks.

either hand

When a bowler delivers a bowl, he can choose to play either a forehandor backhand shot. During play the person in charge of the head may advise the player on the mat that he can play "either hand" rather than directing a particular hand to play.

end

the playing of the jack and all the bowls of all players (or teams) once in a single direction, resulting in either a number of shots for one of the teams, a dead end, or a drawn end. Some forms of the game have a set number of ends played, others play an unlimited number of ends until a particular score is reached or exceeded.

== F ==
fast green

1. (bowl) if a bowl is delivered and finishes past the intended target, it is said to have been a "fast bowl".
2. (green) (a.k.a. quick green) a green is described as quick when the bowls travel at a faster further over the surface compared to a slow green relative to the same amount of effort required when delivering a bowl.
feeler gauge

Used by an umpire or third to judge the distance between the quickjack and one or more bowls, where a bowls measure is too large for use.

fixed stance

when preparing to deliver a bowl, the player positions their feet and legs, and then locks into this position, completing the delivery of the bowl with movement of the upper body only.

foot fault

in games where a mat is used, players are required to keep at least one foot on or over the mat during the delivery. A foot fault occurs when this condition is not met. Depending on the rules of competition and the association running the competition, players can be warned, or their bowl can be declared a dead bowl.

forehand

For a right handed player, delivering a bowl to the right hand side of the rink, with the bias facing towards the centre line of the rink. For a left handed player, delivering a bowl to the left hand side of the rink, with the bias facing towards the centre line of the rink.

fours

a team game where each team consists of four(4) players, a lead, second, third, and skip.

four wood singles

The traditional singles variation of the game. However, it can be played with a different number of woods, resulting in two wood singles.

front ditch

The ditch at the end of the green which is directly in front of a player when they stand on the mat.

full count

scoring the maximum number of possible shots in an end where every bowl from all players in the one team are closest to the jack than the nearest opposition bowl.

== G ==
- give away the mat: At the start of a game a toss of a coin or bowl is held. The winner of the toss has the option to play the first bowl, called keeping the mat, or letting the opposition have the first bowl, to "give away the mat", thus reserving the last bowl of the end for themselves. After the first end, the winner of the end automatically get the mat and the first bowl of the next end. Some controlling bodies have experimented with an additional rule allowing the winner of the end to decide if they keep the mat or give the mat away. Having the last bowl of an end is seen as an advantage, particularly at the highest levels of competition..
- grass:
  1. refers to the width of the bowl required to enable it to stop at a designated point within the rink. To take more grass is to bowl wider than your previous delivery.
  2. a grass green refers to the type of playing surface that the green has manufactured from, as opposed to a synthetic or artificial green.
- green:
  1. alternative description to grass to describe the width of the bowlrequired to enable it to stop at a designated point within the rink. To take more green is to bowl wider than your previous delivery
  2. The area of the playing surface containing one or more rinks, the perimeter of which is usually defined by a surrounding ditch.
- green-keeper: common term for the staff who maintain bowling greens.
- grip:
  1. refers to the way a player holds the bowl in preparation for delivery. Two common grips are the "claw grip" and the "cradle grip".
  2. a bowl that is manufactured with an inverted ridge or dimple around the outer edges of the side of the bowl is also referred to as a grip or "gripped" bowl

.

== H ==
- hand: the direction that a bowl is to be delivered in. See also forehand, backhand, either hand
- handicap: In games of singles, some formats allow for a positive or negative handicap to be applied to players of different ability. For example, in a game of 25 Up, one player may start at +5 shots, and one at -5 shots, meaning the player with a +5 handicap need only score another 20 shots to win, whereas the player on -5 handicap must score 30 shots to win.
- head: refers to the area of the rink where the jack, and any live bowls that have been delivered on any particular end.
- heavy :
  1. (weight) a bowl delivered with more force than required to deliver it to a desired position on the rink
  2. (bowl) a relative description of the physical weight of the bowl, compared with a standard weight bowl, or an xtra heavy weight bowl
  3. (green) a description of the relatively slow pace of the green, compared with a (quick) or (fast) green
- Henselite: name of an Australian-based bowls manufacturer.
- holding :
  1. (bowl) indicates that your bowl is the closest to the jack - "we are holding shot"
  2. (green) a relative description of the line a bowl is taking on the rink at a moment in time. A bowl that is holding its line is an indication that it is travelling a different line to that normally expected, due to either the condition of the green, the pace of the green, or the delivery action of the bowler.
- honour board: lists of achievements that are placed on display, usually within a club house or an associations head office. Honour boards usually recognise office bearers, championship winners, and representative honours at region, county, state, national and international levels of competition.

== I ==
- indoor bowls:
  1. a game of bowls that is played in an indoor arena, with the same equipment and field dimensions as for outdoor bowls
  2. (a.k.a. (carpet bowls)) a variation of outdoor bowls, played on a rectangular piece of carpet that is laid out on the floor, and can be rolled up a stored away between games. Carpet bowls have different types of bowls, which are smaller than an outdoor bowl, and the rules that govern play are unique to this particular form of the game.
- inner ring: on one side of a bowl, there are one or 2 small concentric circles, indicating that this is the biased side, or the side towards which the bowl will turn once delivered out of the hand. See also (outer ring).

== J ==
- jack: (a.k.a. (kitty)) is the small white ball that defined the target, or mark, for all other bowls to be played towards. In outdoor bowls the jack has no bias, but in Crown Green bowls, the jack has a bias similar to the bowl itself.
- jack high: is a comparison of the position of a bowl in relation to the jack. A "jack high bowl" means a bowl whose front edge, which is closest to the bowler on the mat, is level with the front edge of the jack.
- jack level: is an equivalent term for jack high, as defined in the Laws of the Sport of Lawn Bowls Crystal Mark 4th edition definitions C.27. The term is commonly used in affiliate countries including New Zealand and some pacific island nations.

== K ==
- keep the mat: At the start of a game a toss of a coin or (bowl) is held. The winner of the toss has the option to play the first bowl, called keeping the mat, or letting the opposition have the first bowl, to "give away the mat", thus reserving the last bowl of the end for themselves. After the first (end), the winner of the end automatically get the mat and the first bowl of the next end. Some controlling bodies have experimented with an additional rule allowing the winner of the end to decide if the keep the mat or give the mat away. Having the last bowl of an end is seen as an advantage, particularly at the highest levels of competition.
- kill: a bowl delivered in such a way that results in the jack falling outside the boundary of the rink. Once killed, an end is normally replayed, either from the same direction, or from the opposite end by agreement with the opposition. Some competitions require the jack to be spotted on a pre-arranged part of the green if the jack falls outside the rink boundaries, with play continuing with the remaining bowls after being spotted.
- kiss: a bowl that glances either the jackor another bowl, resulting in a slight movement of the jack or bowl involved.
- kitty: (a.k.a. jack) is the small white ball that defined the target, or mark, for all other bowls to be played towards. In outdoor bowls the kitty has no bias, but in Crown Green bowls, the kitty has a bias similar to the bowl itself.
- knock-out: in a competition game, the winner progresses to the next round, however the loser is eliminated, thus being "knocked out" of, the competition.

== L ==
- lawn bowling: traditionally and historical, the game of Bowls was played on grass fields or greens, and thus was known as lawn bowls. With advances in construction techniques, and the introduction of artificial surfaces, in the evolution of the game it has become known as Bowls.
- lead: in a team of 2 or more, the player who delivers his bowl first is known as the lead. The lead has specific duties, including rolling the jack when his team is the first to bowl on a particular end.
- length: refers to the amount of force required when delivering a bowl to reach the desired target. For a draw bowl, the required force would result in the bowl stopping at a point parallel to the jack. See also line
- lifter: a piece of equipment, usually made of metal, which enables a player to pick up a bowl from the green without the need to bend down. Often used by players with an injury or disability which prevents them from bending sufficient to reach the ground.
- lignum vitae: refers to a type of natural hardwood material from a tree, used to make a bowl. Prior to the introduction of composite plastic materials, the predominant material for the manufacture of bowls today, lignum vitae was the dominant material used.
- line: is the directional arc that the bowl travels along from the point of delivery to the point it stops. For a draw bowl, the player will identify an aiming point when letting go of the bowl, such that it will travel along a pathway to end up as close as possible to his target, usually the jack. The line of the bowl will vary depending on the prevailing conditions of the green (heavy, fast), the bias of the bowl, and the desired finishing position.
- live bowl: after a bowl has been delivered and comes to rest, if it stops within the confines of the rink (or green for Crown Green bowls) it is considered live. if a bowl finishes in the ditch, or outside the rink boundary, it is considered a dead bowl . However, if the bowl has touched the jack, it remains a live bowl even if in the ditch, as long as it is within the boundary of the rink.

== M ==
- manager: in team games, a manager is appointed for each team, whose role is to fill in the scorecards, agree the match up of rinks between teams, tally the total scores of all rinks at the end of a game, and submit the result to the governing competition association. The manager may have other duties depending on the domestic regulations in place for a particular competition, and can include being the point of contact for a team in relation to decisions to stop play should adverse weather conditions affect play, but does not normally include adjudicating on the rules of bowls, which is handled by a designated umpire.
- mark: is the target or object that bowls are aimed at. In bowls the mark is the jack (a.k.a. kitty)
- marker: In a game of singles, a non playing bowler will assist the players by aligning the jack on the centre line after it has been rolled, answer questions asked by the players about the state of play, chalk bowls that become touchers, and keep the scorecard and scoreboard up to date during a game.
- mat: a rectangular piece of material, which designates the point from which bowls must be delivered for a particular end.
- matching bowl: a bowl that sits next to or near an opposition bowl in the head.
- maximum length: the maximum distance possible between the mat and the end of the rink, designated by a spot or mark, usually the 2 metre mark.
- measure:
  1. (instrument) a small pocket sized hand held tape measure used to judge the distance between the jack and one or more bowls at the conclusion of an end, which will determine the number of shots held by a player or team.
  2. (distance) if at the conclusion of an end of bowls, the number of shots held by a team or player cannot be determined by agreement, the designated measurer will use a tape measure to determine the result - "Call for a measure".
- minimum length: the minimum distance allowed between the mat and the jack. In the crystal mark edition of rules, the minimum length of an end is 23 metres. Some domestic regulations can vary this minimum length. For example, in Australia, the minimum length is 21 metres. Most greens have a mark on the plinth of the ditch to indicate the minimum length point from the 2 metre mark.
- mirror: a custom designed instrument, used by umpires to determine if a jack or bowl is within the boundary of the rink during play. Often used in conjunction with a scope when making judgements from one end of the rink to the other..

== N ==
- narrow:
  1. (bias) a narrow bias describes the relatively narrow line that a bowl's arc takes from the point of delivery to the point at which it stops. Modern manufactured bowls are known as "narrow bias" bowls as they are designed to take a narrower line, compared to some older brands of bowls manufactured decades ago. Bowls must comply with minimum bias standards determined by World Bowls but vary to suit different styles of play and different playing conditions throughout the world.
  2. (bowl) if a bowl is delivered and finishes to the inner side of the intended target, it is said to have been a "narrow bowl".
- north–south: describes the direction of play for the rinks, which run in parallel with each other on any given day. Most bowls rinks are built to accommodate play alternately in a north–south, or east–west direction. Green keepers and Greens Directors will alter the direction of play to assist in managing the quality of the greens over a season. Most competitions play north–south, to avoid players looking directly into the sun. East-west play is often used for social games. This does not apply to the Crown Green game of bowls which utilises the entire green surface and is not divided into rinks.
- no score: if at the completion of the end, a measure for the shot determines that both teams (or players) have one bowl of equal distance from the jack (or both have a bowl touching the jack), no score is recorded. For games that are based on a number of ends, the end still counts in the total number of ends to be played.

== O ==
- open hand: refers to the side of the rink that has the clearest path for a draw shot. See also forehand and backhand.
- opening day: when a club holds its first event for the year or season. Often a club will hold a formal ceremony on this day, with the club champion and a local community representative, such as the mayor, councillor, or politician, invited to officially open the greens.
- on the dot: refers to a position on the green which is designated as the furthermost distance on the rink where a jack is placed. If a lead rolls the jack, and it travels past this predetermined mark, the jack will be placed "on the dot" prior to the first bowl being delivered. In some jurisdictions this is known as the 2 metre mark.
- outdoor bowls: refers to the variation of bowls which is governed by World Bowls and the crystal mark rules. Whilst using the term "outdoor" there are many venues where this variation of bowls is played in greens constructed within a covered building. See also indoor bowls carpet bowls.
- outer ring: on one side of a bowl, there are one or 2 large concentric circles, indicating that this is the non biased side, or the side away from which the bowl will turn once delivered out of the hand. See also (inner ring).

== P ==
- pace: See speed.
- pairs: a team game where each team consists of two(2) players, a lead, and a skip.
- peg: See boundary peg.
- pennant: a team based competition run at a county or state based level.
- plinth: the vertical trim in a ditch, usually constructed of wood or concrete, and often has a covering of carpet or rubber to dampen the impact of bowls when they travel off the green into the ditch.
- polish: a type of thick liquid compound applied to the surface of a bowl, which is then rubbed into the surface using a hand, cloth or polishing sleeve. The application of polish is designed to clean the surface of the bowl, provide a resistant surface to assist it travel more easily when a bowl is delivered, and provides additional grip between the bowl and the hand.
- possession: the player or team whose turn it is to deliver a bowl is said to be in possession of the mat. Possession passes to the opposition when the bowl has come to rest after a delivery. Possession also includes the possession of the head, and opposition players should remain away from the head when not in possession of the mat.
- practice end: (a.k.a. roll up) a warm up end, without scoring, to enable players to test their bowls in the conditions before a game starts.
- proportional : (a.k.a. 100 up), where the score of bowl is proportional to the number of bowls you have closest to the jack, typically in a game where each player in a singles game has 4 bowls, the closest is worth 4 points, the next closest 3 points and so on.
- put it in your pocket: an expression advising the last player on the mat to not deliver his bowl. It is called for if the player or team is holding shot, or that there is significant danger of changing the head to the detriment of the player/team if the bowl were the change the current situation.

== Q ==
- quick:
  1. (bowl) if a bowl is delivered and finishes past the intended target, it is said to have been a "quick bowl".
  2. (green) (a.k.a. fast green) a green is described as quick when the bowls travel at a faster further over the surface compared to a slow green relative to the same amount of effort required when delivering a bowl

== R ==
- raking: delivering an overweight bowl with the intent of disturbing the head. Often used as a derogatory term for players who are considered to have limited skills with imprecise bowling techniques, therefore often employing an overweight bowl with the hope of claiming the shot.
- re-spot: if during play, the jack is out of bounds, some competitions have provision for placing the jack back within the confines of the rink on a predetermined place. The end then continues from that point with all other live bowls delivered remaining in place.
- resting toucher: a bowl that remains in direct physical contact with the jack after being delivered.
- riding: following a bowl after delivery down the green, often with visible expressions of hope, intent, or exasperation. It is considered poor etiquette to "ride" an opposition players bowl. See also chasing.
- rings:
  1. (bowl) bowls are manufactured with a set of rings on each side of the bowl. The smaller rings indicate the biased side of the bowl, and the outer rings the non biased side of the bowl.
  2. (Stickers) in team based competitions, players on the same team will apply a unique ring shaped decal to both sides of the bowl so that they are easily distinguishable from the opposition's bowls. See also disc.
- rink:
  1. (playing area) the portion of the green which is in play for a particular game, usually marked with boundary pegs at either end of the green.
  2. (team) in team based competitions, a group of players on the same team playing together as a unit can be described as "a rink".
- roll up: (a.k.a. practice end) a warm up end, without scoring, to enable players to test their bowls in the conditions before a game starts.
- rolling the jack: at the start of an end, the player in possession of the mat first rolls the jack along the rink or green to a preferred length, before delivering a bowl.

== S ==
- scope: a custom designed instrument, based on a telescope, used by umpires to determine if a jack or bowl is within the boundary (see boundary peg) of the rink during play. Often used in conjunction with a mirror when making judgements from one end of the rink to the other.
- second: in a team of 3 or more, the player who delivers his bowl immediately after the lead is known as the second. The second has specific duties, including keeping score, updating the rink and overall scoreboards in a multi-rink team competition. In recent years, some associations have directed that the skip must keep the scorecard.
- section: in pennant games, associations may create tiered competition made up of separate sections of teams. Often there are multiple sections to form part of a broader Division. Section winners then play against other section winners in that division to determine the overall division champion.
- sectional play: a number of games where you play all other teams or players in a grouping, and the winner goes on to play other sectional winners. Group sizes will be variable, designed to ensure that the number of winners enable a play-off to reach a final of two section winners.
- sets play: a game made up of 2 or more sets, with each set made up of a number of ends. World Bowls sets play format is two(2) sets of nine ends, with a 3 end tie break if drawn at 1 set all, but this can be varied by a local controlling body.
- shaved: describes the result of a bowl delivered such that it touches the jack or another bowl without changing its current position.
- short:
  1. (bowl) a bowl that has stopped short of its intended target.
  2. (end) describes a relative assessment of the length of the end in comparison with the maximum length end possible
  3. (jack) a jack when delivered that stops at a point less than the minimum length allowed within the rules of competition for the game underway. Minimum lengths are varied by national associations as outlined in the crystal mark edition of the rules or World Bowls
- shot: the bowl nearest the jack.
- slow green: a green is described as slow when the bowls travel at a slower pace over the surface compared to a quick green relative to the amount of effort required when delivering a bowl.
- side: a group of players that make up a team. In pennant play, a side will be made up of 12 to 16 players, divided up into groups of four, also known as a rink.
- singles: a game played between two player.
- skip: in a team of 3 or more, the player who delivers his bowl last is known as the skip. The skip has specific duties, including directing the headfor all other players in the team, and making decisions in co-operation with the opposition skip in the event of a dispute, and calling for an umpire if a dispute cannot be resolved within the teams.
- smalls: a call made when determining which player will deliver the first bowl at the start of a game. One player will roll a bowl end over end, and calling "smalls" refers to the bowl stopping with the side where the smaller rings are facing upward. See also bigs.
- spray chalk: used to indicate a bowl that has touched the jack as part of its initial delivery during an end. A player in charge of the head will use a pressurised can of chalk spray, to place a mark, which must be done before the next bowl comes to a rest, and must be removed before the bowl is delivered on the next end. See also chalk.
- speed: a measurement, in seconds, of the time it takes for a bowl to come to a rest after being delivered by a player. See also timing the green.
- spider: a one bowl competition where all participants are positioned at the edges of the green, and upon an agreed signal, all deliver a bowl towards a jack positioned in the centre of the green.
- spot the jack: when the jack is rolled in a rink based game of bowls, if the bowl comes to rest beyond the 2 metre mark, but within the boundary of the rink, then it is moved to that mark, such that the front of the jack is aligned with the back of the mark.
- stance: the position a player adopts in preparation for delivering the bowl. Some players adopt a fixed stance, where legs and feet are moved into position and then "locked", and the delivery is completed using upper body movement, whereas others will position their feet, then an action involving upper and lower body elements is commenced.
- synthetic: see artificial.

== T ==
- table bowls: a game, designed to be played on a billiard/pool table, with miniaturised bowls, jack, and delivery ramp.
- taking green: See line. If the resting place of a bowl is too wide, or particularly too narrow, to that intended, the director of the head may ask to "make sure you take your green", meaning adjust your line compared to your last bowl.
- tape: a custom-designed tape measure used to judge the distance between the jack and one or more bowls at the conclusion of an end, which will determine the number of shots held by a player or team. A tape is used when a players measure is not long enough to reach the bowls in question. A longer tape is also used to measure if the jack has been delivered past the minimum length required.
- Taylors: name of a Scotland-based bowls manufacturer.
- testing: a service offered by bowls manufacturers to ensure bowls still meet manufacturer and World Bowls Ltd guidelines for the amount of bias that should be exhibited by the bowls. Some associations mandate bowls must be re-tested at a predetermined interval of years. In associations where testing is mandated, bowls that do not have a stamp indicating their status can be banned from use in competitions within that association.
- testing table: a table used to check that a bowl or set of bowls conform to the bias requirements of the governing body of the sport, World Bowls. Manufacturers of bowls have testing tables, used both in the manufacturing process, and as a testing service to bowlers.
- third: in a team of 4, the player who delivers his bowl after the lead and second have delivered their bowls is known as the third. The third has specific duties, including directing the head when it is the turn of the skip to deliver his bowls.
- tickle the kitty: describes the result of a bowl delivered such that it moves the jack a slight distance from its current position.
- tie break: at the end of a games scheduled number of ends, if the scores are level, a tie break end(s) will be played to determine a winner. In games where there is a set number of ends, one extra end is normally played. In sets play, a tie break, normally of three ends, is played if each player or side has won the same number of sets, after the designated number of sets have been played. An individual set does not have a tie break if the result is drawn at the end of that set.
- tiff: a type of grass (also known as Titdwarf, a Bermuda grass hybrid) used for the construction of lawn bowls greens. Known for its turf quality, and ability to be mowed very low, well known in warmer climates, but increasingly hybrid varieties are being used in cool climate areas.
- timing the green: in some competitions, an umpire will provide an indication of the speed of the green, by performing a test "timing of the green". It is determined either with a stop-watch, recording the result of the times of a number of bowls from the point of deliver to the point of coming to rest, or using a timing ramp. The result will be a time, in seconds, usually to 2 decimal places.
- timing ramp: a custom designed piece of equipment that calculated the speed of the green. the ramp uses a ball, which is delivered down the ramp in several locations on the green, and a calculation table is then used to convert the results into a time, in seconds. The timing ramp tries to overcome the variances in manually timing a green using a stopwatch and delivery of a bowl by hand. See also timing the green
- toss: a call made when determining which player or team will deliver the first bowl at the start of a game. One player will toss a coin end over end, and calling "heads" or "tails" refers to the coin stopping with the head or tail of the coin are facing upward.
- toucher: a bowl that makes contact with the jack during its initial delivery.
- trail: playing a bowl so that it moves the jack from its current position to a position further sideways or backwards along the rink.
- triples: a team game where each team consists of three(3) players, a lead, second, and skip
- trial end: (a.k.a. roll up) a warm up end, without scoring, to enable players to test their bowls in the conditions before a game starts..

== U ==
- umpire: An official nominated by the competition organiser to provide adjudication of the rules of competition, and to interpret the rules of bowls in the event of a dispute. Once an umpire is called, the decision of the umpire is final and binding on all players involved in the dispute.
- unbiased: refers to a bowl or jack that has no bias. In most forms of the sport, the jack does not have a bias, and some indoor versions of the sport also have bowls with no bias. crown green Bowls have both a biased jack and bowl.
- up: expression to confirm if you or your team have one or more bowls closest to the jack. If a marker is providing this information in a singles game, the marker can also indicate this status by holding a clenched fist upwards towards the sky.

== W ==
- walkover: where a player or team is unable to contest a pre-arranged game, either through non arrival, late arrival, or not having sufficient players to constitute a team, a win is awarded to the opposition. Rules governing walkovers are usually defined by the competition, and vary across county, state, national, and international competitions.
- wedge: see chock.
- weight:
  1. (bowl) the physical weight of the bowl. See also heavy; xtra Heavy
  2. (delivery) the relative effort required to ensure a bowl, when delivered, reaches its intended target.
- wick: when a bowl is deflected during its progress after delivery. In most cases, this will be from contacting a bowl or jack. After the "wick", the direction of the bowl is altered away from its regular arc implied by the bias.
- wide:
  1. (bowl) if a bowl is delivered and finishes to the outer side of the intended target, it is said to have been a "wide bowl".
  2. (hand) a comparative assessment between the two sides of a bowl rink, either side of the bowlcentre line. If due to prevailing weather or green conditions (usually wind) a bowler must aim his bowl further away from the target(jack, bowl or other position on the green), on a particular side of the rink, it is known as the "wide hand"
- wood: alternative name for a bowl. Derived from the fact that bowls were once made using a dense hardwood, lignum vitae.
- wrong bias: a bowl delivered where the biased side of the bowl has been placed opposite to the desired position for a given delivery. If a right handed player plays a forehand delivery, but has the biased side of the bowl on the right, the bowls bias will take an arc away from the intended target, and in most cases, outside the rink boundary. As well as becoming a dead bowl, the person delivering the bowl is sometimes subjected to gentle "ridicule". Clubs may also have a "house rule" with a penalty for a witnessed "wrong bias" such as a fine into a charity jar, or buying a drink for your opponents.

== X ==
- xtra Heavy: describes the physical weight of the bowl compared to other bowls of the same size. Most bowls manufacturers provide 3 different weights for each bowl size, standard; heavy; and xtra heavy.

== Y ==
- yard on: deliver the bowl with sufficient weight to finish 1 yard past the objective (usually the jack, or another bowl within the rink)
