= Bowls =

Sport involving rolling biased balls

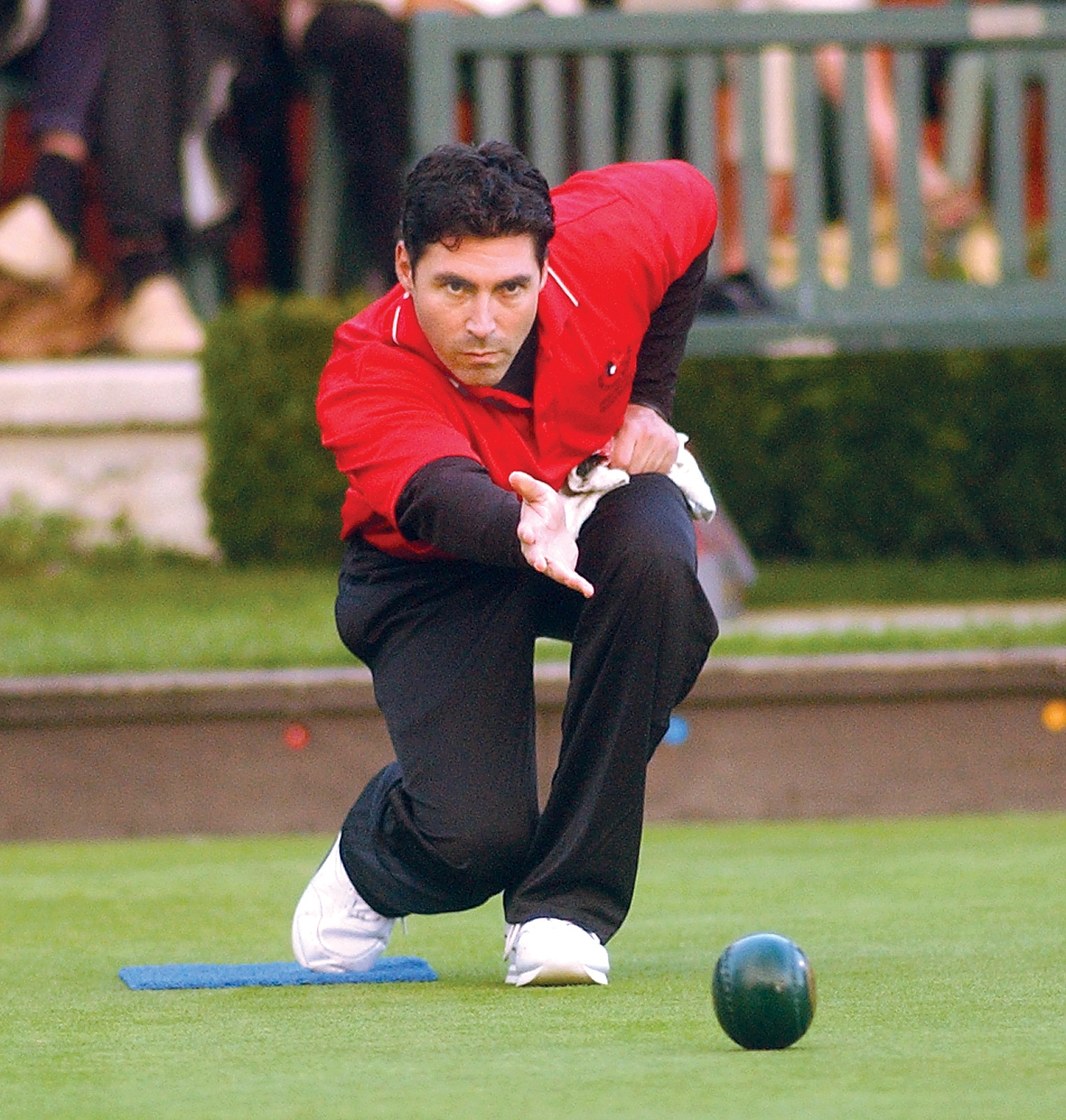
- Canadian lawn bowler Tim Mason
- First played: 13th century

Characteristics
- Type: Bowling
- Equipment: Bowl/wood and jack/kitty

Bowls, also known as lawn bowls or lawn bowling, is a sport in which players try to roll their ball (called a bowl) closest to a smaller ball (known as a "jack" or sometimes a "kitty"). The bowls are shaped (biased), so that they follow a curved path when being rolled. The game is played either in teams or one against one.

The game was first played in the 13th century. The game is played on grass, although other surfaces are sometimes used. Matches are held either until one player gets to a score, or when a number of ends are played.

The game is mostly played on a bowling green, which can vary by the type of bowls being played. Whilst the game is often played outdoors, there are indoor bowling venues, and can also be played on rollable carpets. For outdoor games, this is usually on grass; however, it can also be played on cotula in New Zealand.

== History ==
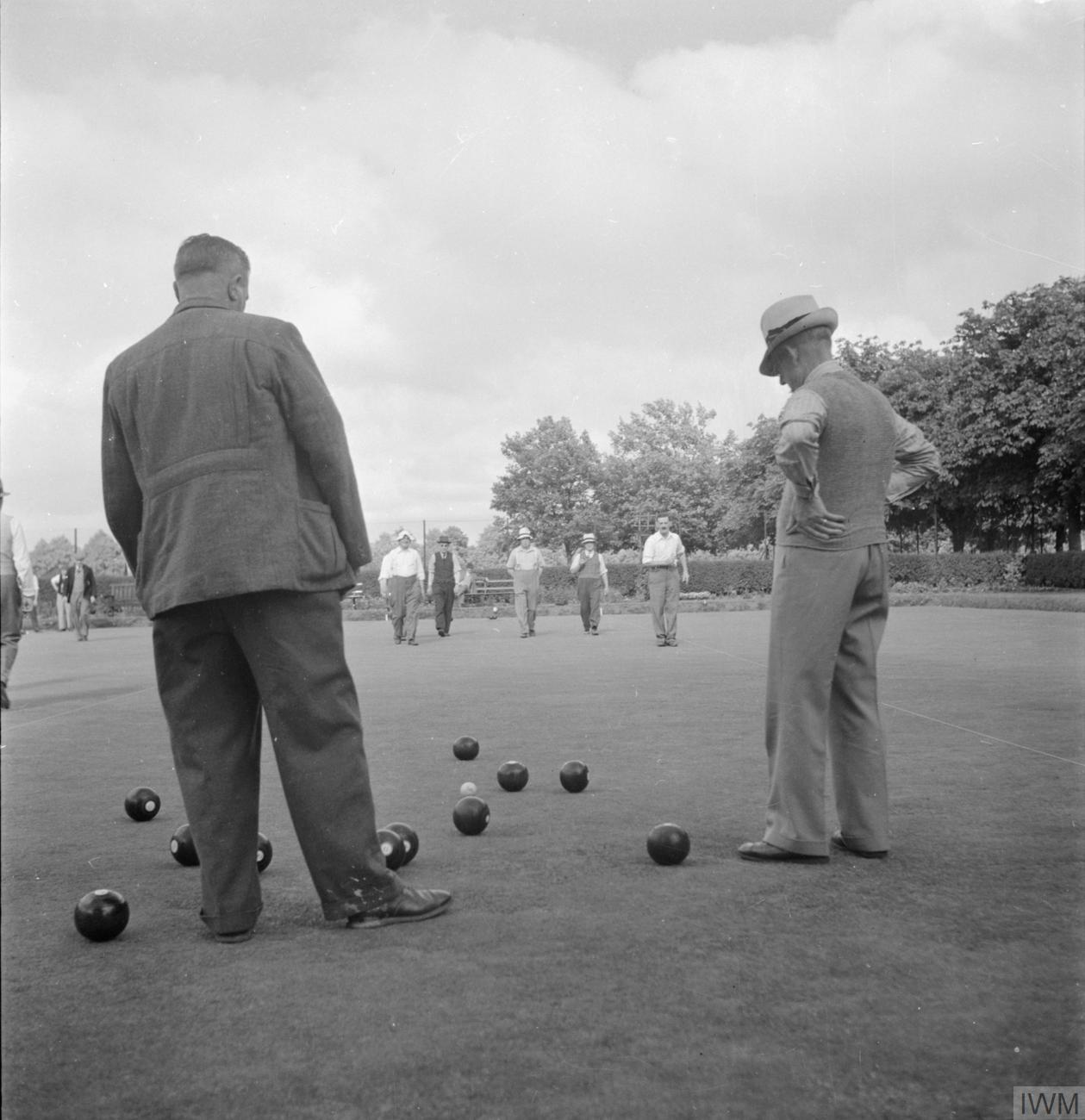
A game of bowls underway, Reading, England, 1945

Bowls is a variant of the boules games (Italian: bocce), which, in their general form, are of ancient or prehistoric origin. Ancient Greek variants are recorded that involved throwing light objects (such as flat stones, coins, or later also stone balls) as far as possible. The aspect of tossing the balls to approach a target as closely as possible is recorded in ancient Rome. This game was spread to Roman Gaul by soldiers or sailors. A Roman sepulchre in Florence shows people playing this game, stooping down to measure the points.

Bowls in England has been traced certainly to the 13th century, and conjecturally to the 12th century. William Fitzstephen, in his biography of Thomas Becket, gives a graphic sketch of the London of his day and, writing of the summer amusements of young men, says that on holidays they were "exercised in Leaping, Shooting, Wrestling, Casting of Stones [in jactu lapidum], and Throwing of Javelins fitted with Loops for the Purpose, which they strive to fling before the Mark; they also use Bucklers, like fighting Men." It is commonly supposed that by jactus lapidum, Fitzstephen refers to an early variety of bowls, possibly played using round stone; there is a record of iron bowls being used, though at a much later date, on festive occasions at Nairn. On the other hand, the jactus lapidum of which he speaks may have been more akin to shot put.

It is clear, at any rate, that a rudimentary form of the game was played in England in the 13th century. A manuscript of that period in the royal library, Windsor (No. 20, E iv.), contains a drawing representing two players aiming at a small cone instead of an earthenware ball or jack. The world's oldest surviving bowling green is the Southampton Old Bowling Green, which was first used in 1299.

Another manuscript of the same century has a crude but spirited picture which brings us into close touch with the existing game. Three figures are introduced and a jack. The first player's bowl has come to rest just in front of the jack; the second has delivered his bowl and is following after it with one of those eccentric contortions still not unusual on modern greens, the first player meanwhile making a repressive gesture with his hand, as if to urge the bowl to stop short of his own; the third player is depicted as in the act of delivering his bowl. A 14th-century manuscript, Book of Prayers, in the Francis Douce collection in the Bodleian Library at Oxford, contains a drawing in which two persons are shown, but they bowl to no mark. Strutt (Sports and Pastimes) suggests that the first player's bowl may have been regarded by the second player as a species of jack; but in that case it is not clear what was the first player's target. In these three earliest illustrations of the pastime each player has one bowl only, and that the attitude in delivering it was as various five or six hundred years ago as it is today. In the third, he stands almost upright; in the first, he kneels; in the second, he stoops, halfway between the upright and the kneeling position.

Bowling greens in New York City's Central Park

The game eventually came under the ban of king and Parliament, both fearing it might jeopardise the practice of archery, then so important in battle. Statutes forbidding it and other sports were enacted in the reigns of Edward III, Richard II and other monarchs. Even when, on the invention of gunpowder and firearms, the bow had fallen into disuse as a weapon of war, the prohibition was continued. The discredit attaching to bowling alleys, first established in London in 1455, probably encouraged subsequent repressive legislation, for many of the alleys were connected with taverns frequented by the dissolute and gamesters.

Erasmus referred to the game as globurum. The name of bowls is implied in the gerund bowlyn, recorded in the mid-15th century. The term bowl for "wooden ball" is recorded in the early 1400s. The name is explicitly mentioned, as bowles, in a list of unlawful games in a 1495 act by Henry VII (Tenys, Closshe, Dise, Cardes, Bowles). It occurs again in a similar statute by Henry VIII (1511). By a further act, the Unlawful Games Act 1541—which was not repealed until 1845—artificers, labourers, apprentices, servants and the like were forbidden to play bowls at any time except Christmas, and then only in their master's house and presence. It was further enjoined that any one playing bowls outside his own garden or orchard was liable to a penalty of 6s. 8d. (6 shillings and 8 pence), while those possessed of lands of the yearly value of £100 might obtain licences to play on their own private greens.

In 1864, William Wallace Mitchell (1803–1884), a Glasgow Cotton Merchant, published his "Manual of Bowls Playing" following his work as the secretary formed in 1849 by Scottish bowling clubs which became the basis of the rules of the modern game. Young Mitchell was only 11 years old when he played on Kilmarnock bowling green, the oldest club in Scotland, instituted in 1740.

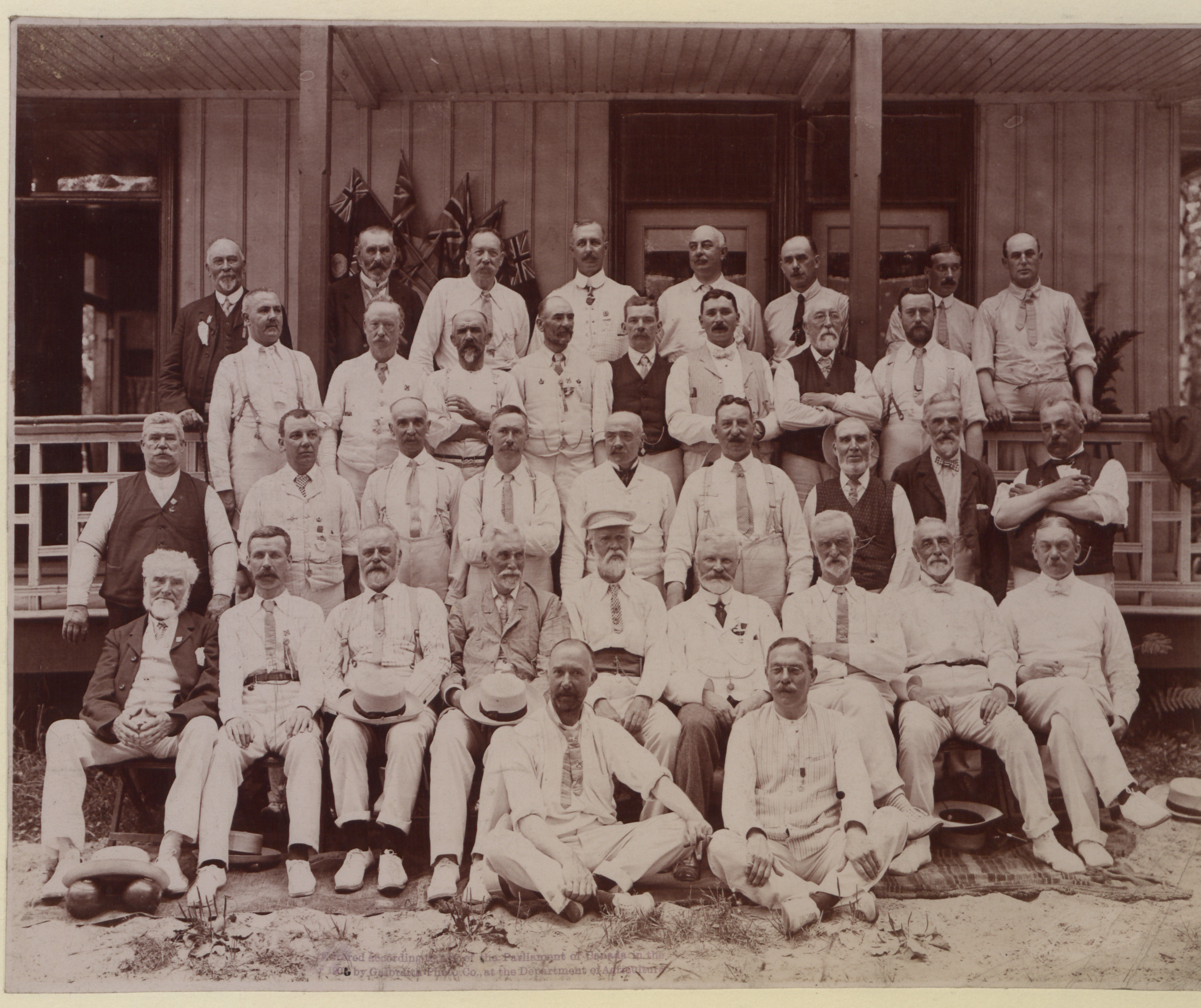
British bowls team visiting Canada, 1906

The patenting of the first lawn mower in 1830, in Britain, is strongly believed to have been the catalyst for the worldwide preparation of modern-style greens, sporting ovals, playing fields, pitches, grass courts, etc. This, in turn, led to the codification of modern rules for many sports, including lawn bowls, most football codes, lawn tennis and others.

National Bowling Associations were established in the late 1800s. The Victorian Bowling Association was formed in Victoria, Australia in 1880. The Scottish Bowling Association was established in 1892, although there had been a failed attempt in 1848 by 200 Scottish clubs.

Today, bowls is played in over 40 countries with more than 50 member national authorities.

== Game ==
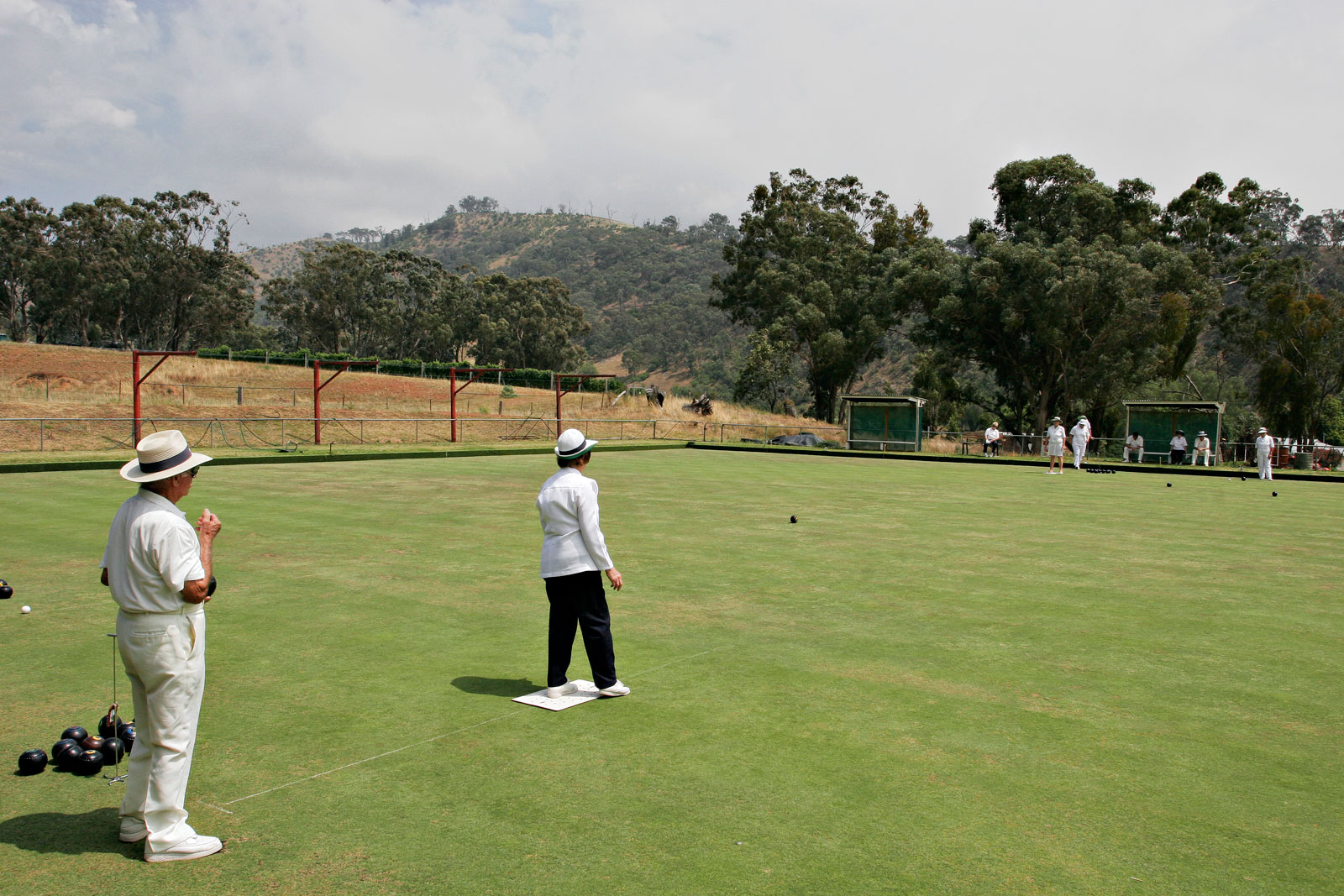
Swifts Creek Bowls Club, Victoria, Australia

Lawn bowls is usually played on a large, rectangular, precisely levelled and manicured grass or synthetic surface known as a bowling green which is divided into parallel playing strips called rinks. In the simplest competition, singles, one of the two opponents flips a coin to see who wins the "mat" and begins a segment of the competition (in bowling parlance, an "end"), by placing the mat and rolling the jack to the other end of the green to serve as a target. Once it has come to rest, the jack is aligned to the centre of the rink and the players take turns to roll their bowls from the mat towards the jack and thereby build up the "head".

A bowl may curve outside the rink boundary on its path, but must come to rest within the rink boundary to remain in play. Bowls falling into the ditch are dead and removed from play, except in the event when one has "touched" the jack on its way. "Touchers" are marked with chalk and remain alive in play even if they get into the ditch. Similarly if the jack is knocked into the ditch it is still alive unless it is out of bounds to the side resulting in a "dead" end which is replayed, though according to international rules the jack is "respotted" to the centre of the rink and the end is continued. After each competitor has delivered all of their bowls (four each in singles and pairs, three each in triples, and two bowls each in fours), the distance of the closest bowls to the jack is determined (the jack may have been displaced) and points, called "shots", are awarded for each bowl which a competitor has closer than the opponent's nearest to the jack. For instance, if a competitor has bowled two bowls closer to the jack than their opponent's nearest, they are awarded two shots. The exercise is then repeated for the next end, a game of bowls typically being of twenty-one ends.

Lawn bowls is played on grass and variations from green to green are common. Greens come in all shapes and sizes: the most common are fast, slow, big crown, small crown.

Bowls is generally played in a very good spirit, even at the highest professional level, acknowledgment of opponents' successes and near misses being quite normal.

== Scoring ==
Scoring systems vary from competition to competition. Games can be decided when:

- a player in a singles game reaches a specified target number of shots (usually 21 or 25).
- a team (pair, triple or four) has the higher score after a specified number of ends.

Games to a specified number of ends may also be drawn. The draw may stand, or the opponents may be required to play an extra end to decide the winner. These provisions are always published beforehand in the event's conditions of play.

In the Laws of the Sport of Bowls the winner in a singles game is the first player to score 21 shots. In all other disciplines (pairs, triples, fours), the winner is the team who has scored the most shots after 21 or 25 ends of play. Often local tournaments will play shorter games (usually 10 or 12 ends). Some competitions use a "set" scoring system, with the first to seven points awarded a set in a best-of-three or best-of-five set match. As well as singles competition, there can be two (pairs), three (triples) and four-player (fours) teams. In these, teams bowl alternately, with each player within a team bowling all their bowls, then handing over to the next player. The team captain or "skip" always plays last and is instrumental in directing his team's shots and tactics. The current method of scoring in the professional tour (World Bowls Tour) is sets. Each set consists of nine ends and the player with the most shots at the end of a set wins the set. If the score is tied the set is halved. If a player wins two sets, or gets a win and a tie, that player wins the game. If each player wins a set, or both sets end tied, there is a 3-end tiebreaker to determine a winner.

== Bias of bowls ==
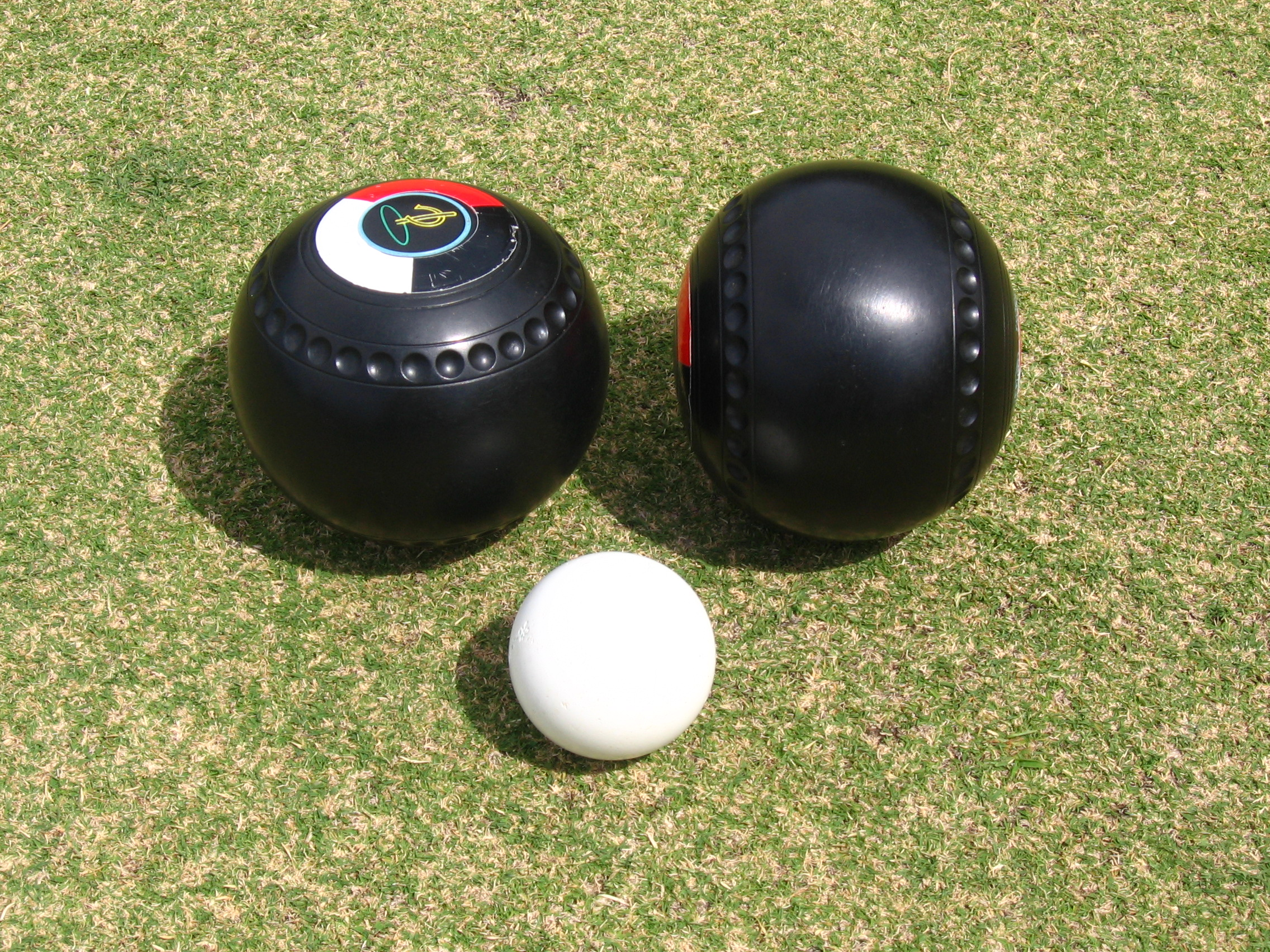
Two bowls with club stickers. The jack/kitty is sitting in front of the bowls.

Bowls are designed to travel a curved path because of a weight bias which was originally produced by inserting weights in one side of the bowl. The word bias itself is recorded as a technical term of the game in the 1560s.

The insertion of weights is no longer permitted by the rules and bias is now produced entirely by the shape of the bowl. A bowler determines the bias direction of the bowl in his hand by a dimple or symbol on one side. Regulations determine the minimum bias allowed, and the range of diameters (11.6 to 13.1 cm (4.6 to 5.2 in)), but within these rules bowlers can and do choose bowls to suit their own preference. They were originally made from lignum vitae, a dense wood giving rise to the term "woods" for bowls, but are now more typically made of a hard plastic composite material.

Bowls were once only available coloured black or brown, but they are now available in a variety of colours. They have unique symbol markings engraved on them for identification. Since many bowls look the same, coloured, adhesive stickers or labels are also used to mark the bowls of each team in bowls matches. Some local associations agree on specific colours for stickers for each of the clubs in their area. Provincial or national colours are often assigned in national and international competitions. These stickers are used by officials to distinguish teams.

Bowls have symbols unique to the set of four for identification. The side of the bowl with a larger symbol within a circle indicates the side away from the bias. That side with a smaller symbol within a smaller circle is the bias side toward which the bowl will turn. It is not uncommon for players to deliver a "wrong bias" shot from time to time and see their carefully aimed bowl crossing neighbouring rinks rather than heading towards their jack.

When bowling there are several types of delivery. "Draw" shots are those where the bowl is rolled to a specific location without causing too much disturbance of bowls already in the head. For a right-handed bowler, "forehand draw" or "finger peg" is initially aimed to the right of the jack, and curves in to the left. The same bowler can deliver a "backhand draw" or "thumb peg" by turning the bowl over in his hand and curving it the opposite way, from left to right. In both cases, the bowl is rolled as close to the jack as possible, unless tactics demand otherwise. A "drive" or "fire" or "strike" involves bowling with force with the aim of knocking either the jack or a specific bowl out of play - and with the drive's speed, there is virtually no noticeable (or, at least, much less) curve on the shot. An "upshot" or "yard on" shot involves delivering the bowl with an extra degree of weight (often referred to as "controlled" weight or "rambler"), enough to displace the jack or disturb other bowls in the head without killing the end. A "block" shot is one that is intentionally placed short to defend from a drive or to stop an oppositions draw shot. The challenge in all these shots is to be able to adjust line and length accordingly, the faster the delivery, the narrower the line or "green".

== Variations of play ==
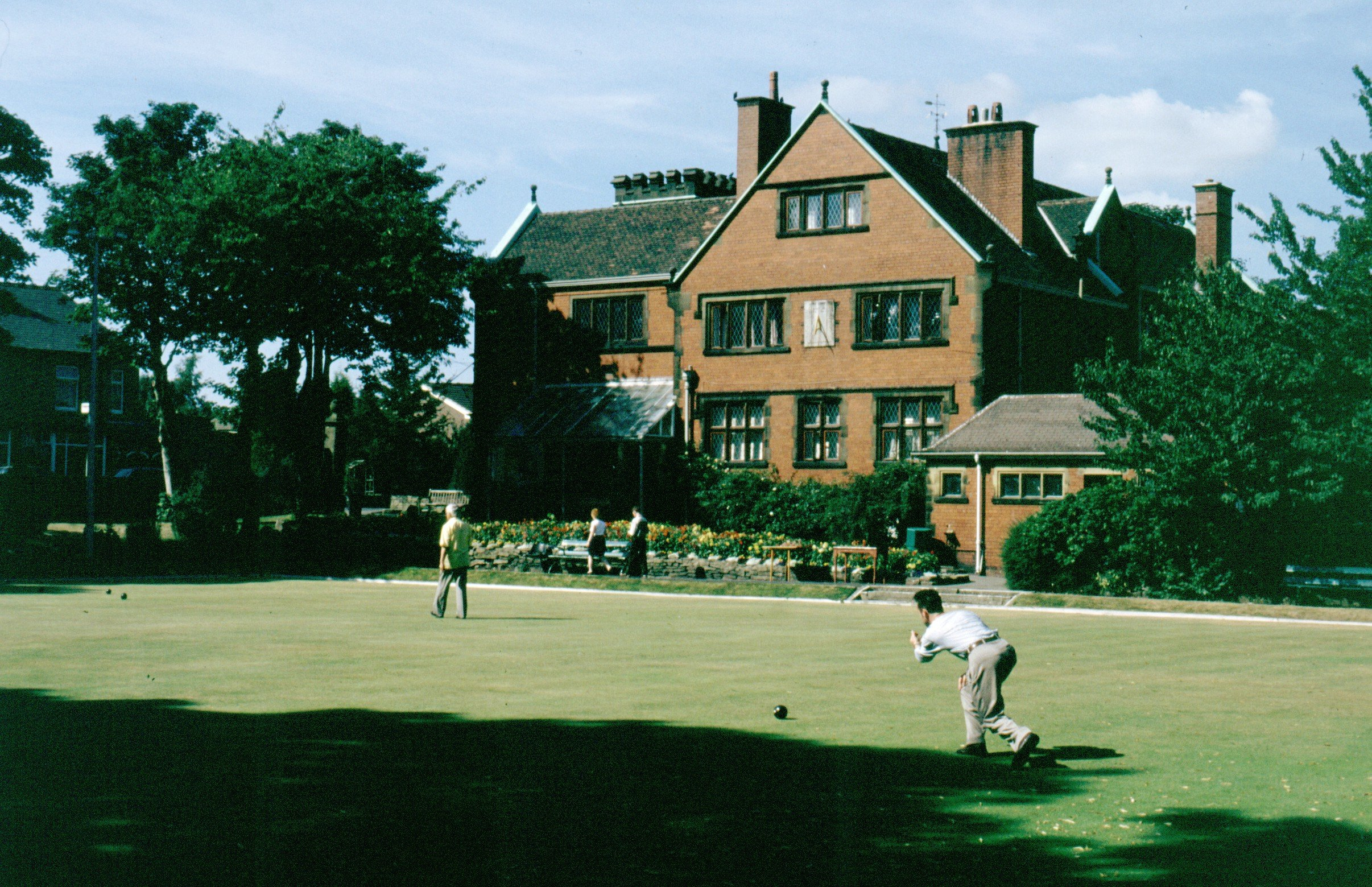
A crown green at Edgworth, Lancashire

Particularly in team competition there can be a large number of bowls on the green towards the conclusion of the end, and this gives rise to complex tactics. Teams "holding shot" with the closest bowl will often make their subsequent shots not with the goal of placing the bowl near the jack, but in positions to make it difficult for opponents to get their bowls into the head, or to places where the jack might be deflected to if the opponent attempts to disturb the head.

There are many different ways to set up the game. Crown Green Bowling utilises the entire green. A player can send the jack anywhere on the green in this game and the green itself is more akin to a golf green, with much undulation. It is played with only two woods each. The jack also has a bias and is only slightly smaller than the woods. At the amateur level it is usual for several ends to be played simultaneously on one green. If two moving woods meet, both are taken back and the shots replayed. If a moving wood strikes a stationary wood or jack from another end, it is again taken back and replayed, but the bowl struck is replaced where contact took place. The game is played usually to 21-up in Singles and Doubles format with some competitions playing to 31-up. The Panel (Professional Crown Green Bowls) is played at the Red Lion Bowling Green, Westhoughton daily and is played to 41-up with greenside betting throughout play. The Green was formerly owned by the pub (now demolished) but was purchased in 2007 by The Panel who paid the brewery £12,000 for the green and its surrounds.

Singles, triples and fours and Australian pairs are some ways the game can be played. In singles, two people play against each other and the first to reach 21, 25, or 31 shots (as decided by the controlling body) is the winner. In one variation of singles play, each player uses two bowls only and the game is played over 21 ends. A player concedes the game before the 21st end if the score difference is such that it is impossible to draw equal or win within the 21 ends. If the score is equal after 21 ends, an extra end is played to decide the winner. An additional scoring method is set play. This comprises two sets over nine ends. Should a player win a set each, they then play a further 3 ends that will decide the winner.

Pairs allows both people on a team to play Skip and Lead. The lead throws two bowls, the skip delivers two, then the lead delivers his remaining two, the skip then delivers his remaining two bowls. Each end, the leads and skips switch positions. This is played over 21 ends or sets play. Triples is with three players while Fours is with four players in each team and is played over 21 ends.

Another pairs variation is 242 pairs (also known as Australian Pairs). In the first end of the game the A players lead off with 2 bowls each, then the B players play 4 bowls each, before the A players complete the end with their final 2 bowls. The A players act as lead and skip in the same end. In the second end the roles are reversed with the A players being in the middle. This alternating pattern continues through the game which is typically over 15 ends.

Short Mat Bowls is an all-year sport unaffected by weather conditions and it does not require a permanent location as the rink mats can be rolled up and stowed away. This makes it particularly appropriate for small communities as it can be played in village halls, schools, sports and social clubs.

Bowls are played by the blind and paraplegic. Blind bowlers are extremely skillful. A string is run out down the centre of the lane and wherever the jack lands, it is moved across to the string and the length is called out by a sighted marker. When the woods are sent the distance from the jack is called out, in yards, feet and inches. The position in relation to the jack is given using the clock; 12.00 is behind the jack.

=== Tra bowls ===
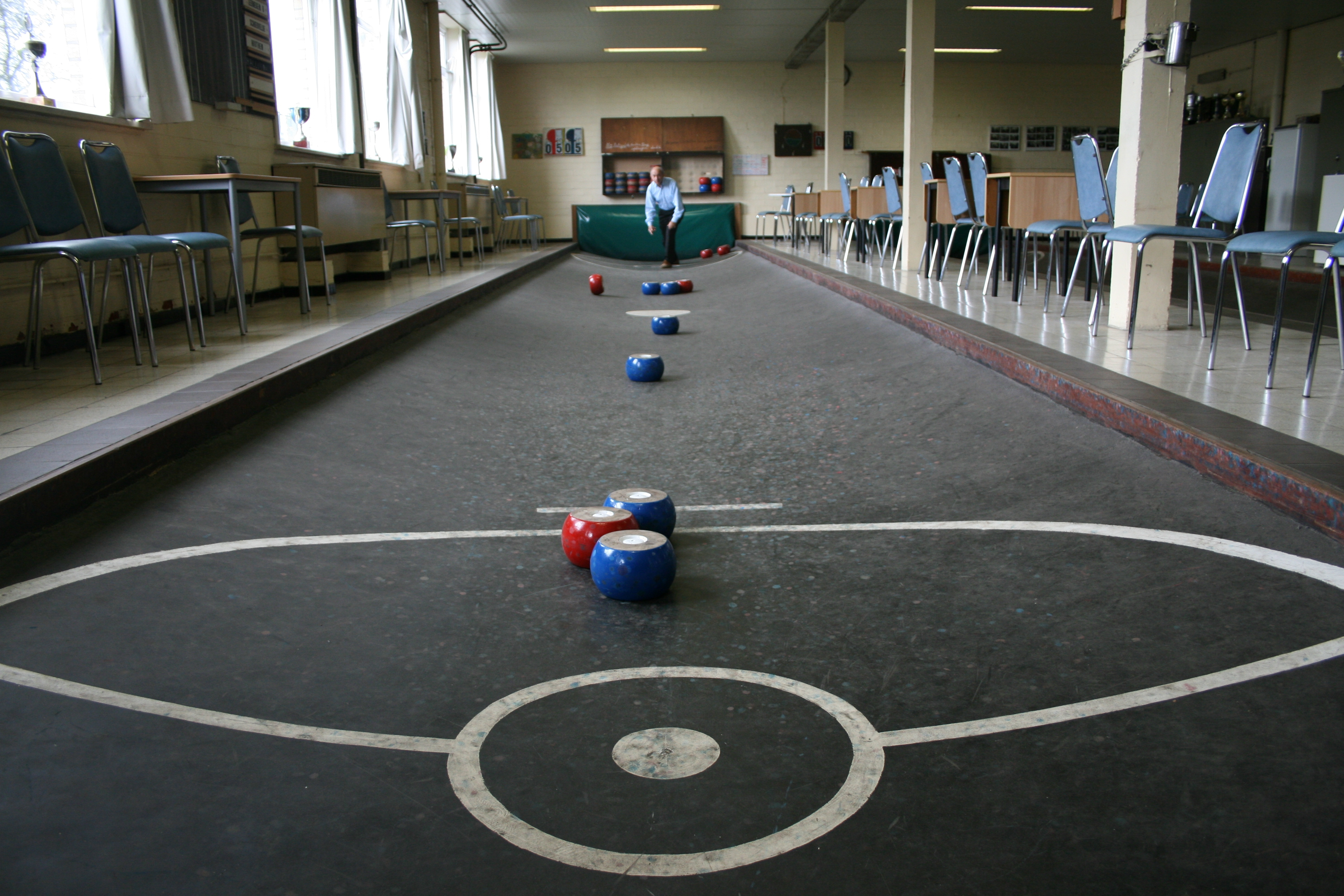
A bowls tra with bowls and spectator seats next to it

In the province of West Flanders (and surrounding regions), tra bowls is the most popular variation of bowls. As opposed to playing it on a flat or uneven terrain, the terrain is made smooth but hollow (tra just means "hollow road" in Flemish). The hollow road causes the path to be curving even more.

The balls are biased in the same way as the lawn bowls balls but with a diameter of about 20 cm (7.9 in), a thickness of 12 cm (4.7 in) and a weight of about 2 kg (4.4 lb), they are a bit bigger than usual bowls. The target is an unmovable feather or metal plate on the ground, instead of a small ball. The length of the tra is about 18 m (59 ft).

The scoring is also different, as a point is awarded for every shot that brings the ball closer to the target than any opponent's ball. This causes pure blocking strategies to be less effective.

In 1972, the West-Flemish tra bowls federation was founded to uniform the local differing rules and to organise a match calendar. Meanwhile, they also organise championships and tournaments.

=== New Zealand Indoor Bowls ===
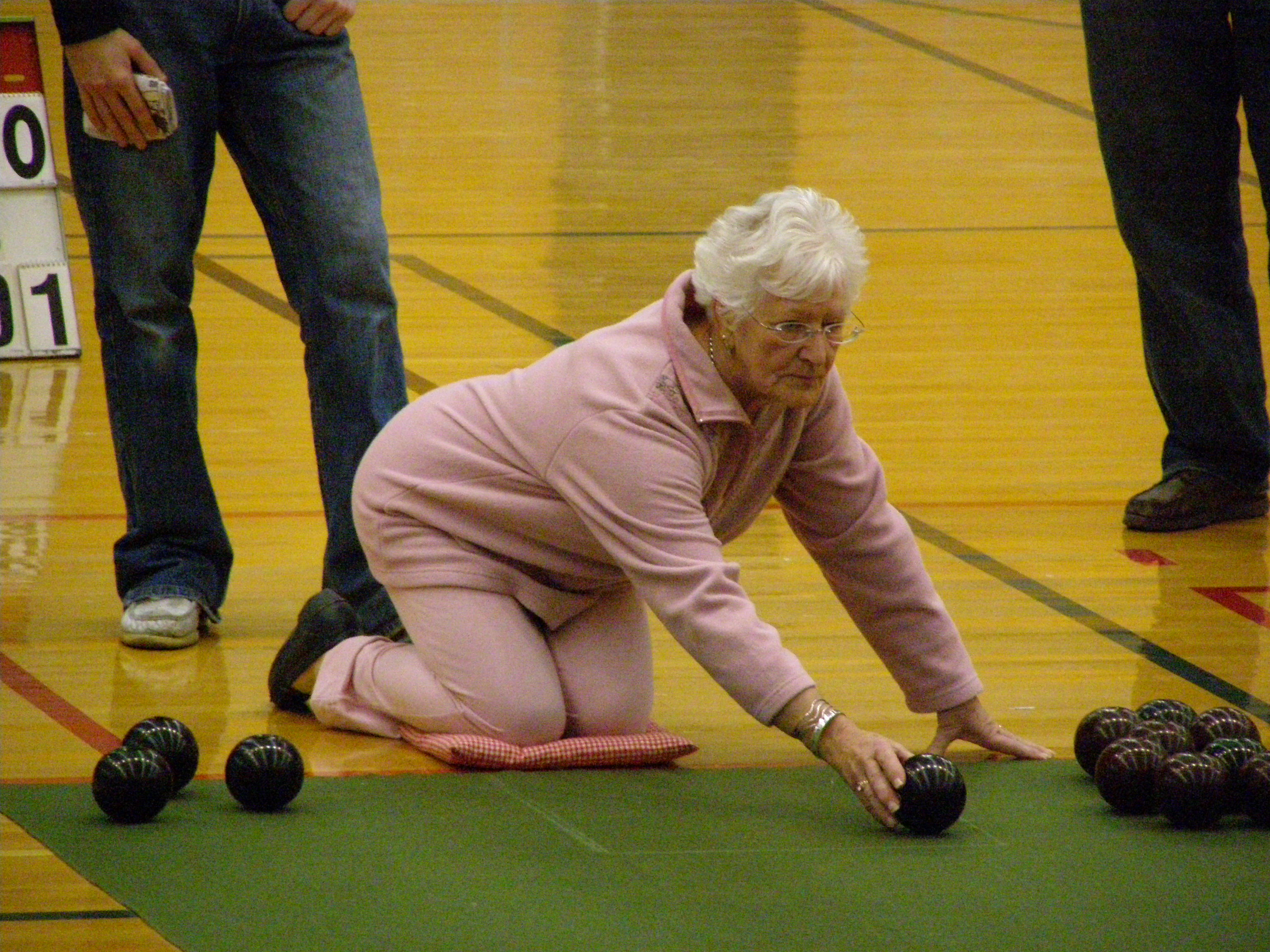
A player kneels to bowl in a New Zealand Indoor Bowls competition

New Zealand Indoor Bowls is a unique variant of indoor bowls developed in New Zealand in the early 20th century. It is played on a carpet mat 6.7 m long and 1.8 m wide. The sport reached its heyday in New Zealand in the 1960s and 1970s with upward of 70,000 registered players, but has since seen a gradual decline in membership. The New Zealand Indoor Bowls Federation is the sport's governing body and it is only played competitively in New Zealand, though there is a biennial Trans-Tasman fixture using custom rules compromising between those used in Australia and New Zealand.

== Competitions ==
There are various bowls competitions held around the world (see - World Bowls Events).

Bowls is one of the "core sports" that must be included at each edition of the Commonwealth Games. With the exception of the 1966 Games, the sport has been included in all Games since their inception in 1930. England has so far dominated the sport with 51 medals.

== In popular culture ==
- Blackball – a 2003 comedy film about a young bowls player, based upon Griff Sanders.
- Crackerjack – a 2002 Australian comedy film about a wisecracking layabout who joins a lawn bowls club in order to be allowed to use a free parking spot but is forced to play bowls with the much older crowd when the club enters financial difficulty.

== See also ==
- Basque bowls
- Bocce
- Boccia
- Bolas criollas
- Boules
- Disabled lawn bowls player classification
- Hastings Open Bowls Tournament
- Lawn game
- Pétanque
- Short mat bowls
- Trugo
- World Bowls Events
