= The Storr =

Rocky hill on the Isle of Skye, Scotland

Coordinates: 57.50669°N 6.18368°W

- An Stòr
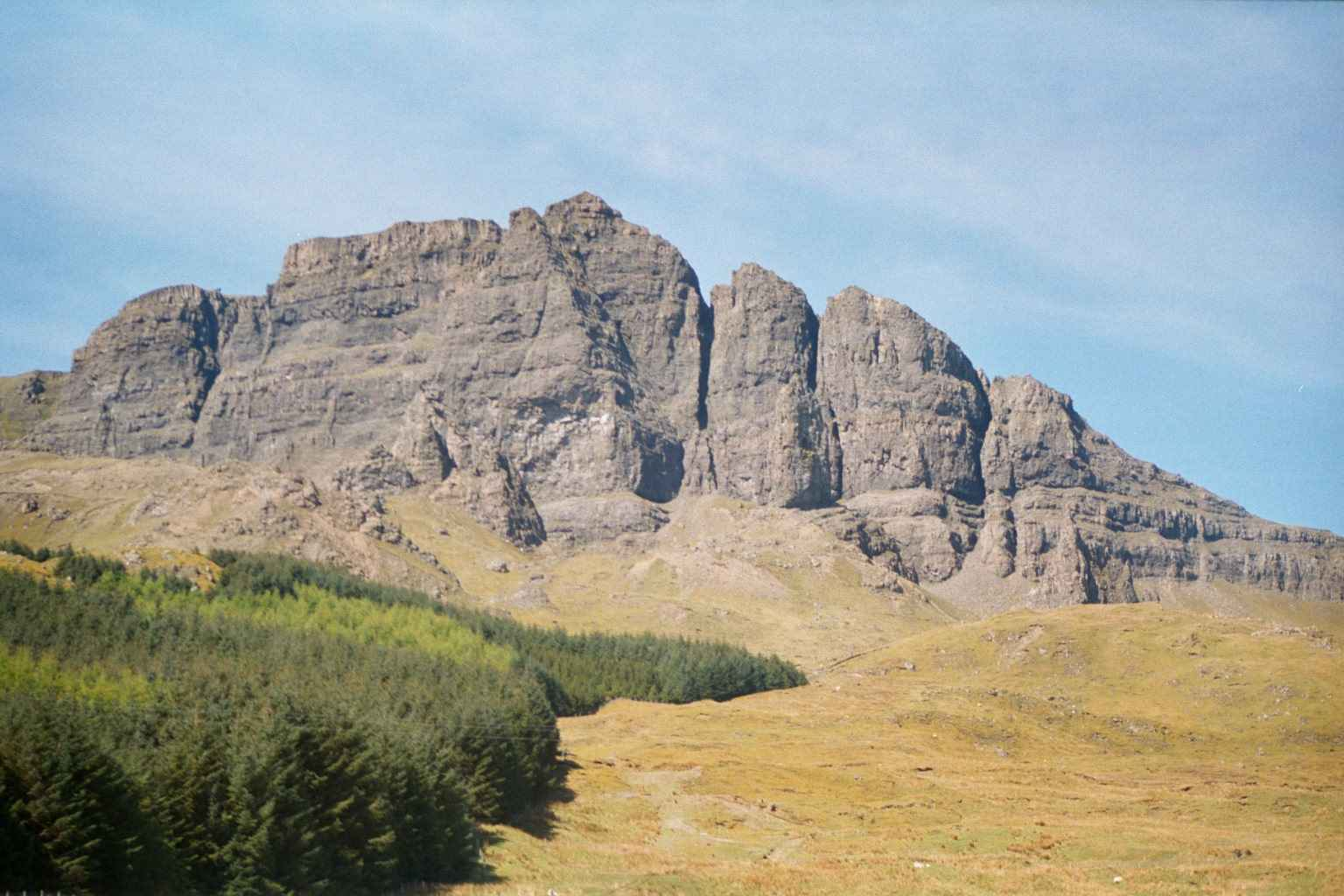

Highest point
- Elevation: 719 m (2,359 ft)
- Prominence: c. 674 metres (2,211 ft) (Ranked 73rd in British Isles)
- Parent peak: Sgurr Alasdair
- Isolation: 24.02 km (14.93 mi)
- Listing: Graham, Marilyn

Geography
- Location: Trotternish, Skye, Scotland
- OS grid: NG495540
- Topo map: Ordnance Survey Landranger 23

The Storr (Scottish Gaelic: An Stòr) is a mountain on the Trotternish peninsula of the Isle of Skye in Scotland. The hill presents a steep rocky eastern face overlooking the Sound of Raasay, contrasting with gentler grassy slopes to the west.

== Geology ==
The Storr is a prime example of the Trotternish landslip, the longest such feature in Great Britain. It is the type locality for the mineral gyrolite.

The area in front of the cliffs of the Storr is known as the Sanctuary. This has a number of weirdly shaped rock pinnacles, the remnants of ancient landslips.

== Ascent routes ==
A well-constructed path, used by many sightseers, leaves the A855 just north of Loch Leathan. It heads up through a clearfell area that was formerly a conifer plantation. Most day-trippers are content simply to wander around the Sanctuary, admiring the pinnacles and gazing up at the Storr's eastern cliffs. Walkers can easily ascend to the summit, however, by skirting below the cliffs whilst heading north from the north end of the Sanctuary. After passing over a fence at a makeshift stile and climbing a brief steep section of loose rock, the recommended route for walkers heads north-west as far as Coire Scamadal, 1 km north of the summit, then doubles back and heads southwards along the north side, climbing towards the summit. From this route, visible breaks in the cliffs offer tempting short cuts, but these are steep, may not save time and may not be safe. An alternative route, involving some mild scrambling, follows the rim of the south-east-facing cliffs from the top of the aforementioned steep section.

Another route to or from the summit starts 500 metres (1/4 mile) south-west of the car park and heads north-west to Bealach Beag, about 1 km (5/8 mi) south-west of the summit, following the course of a stream which breaches the cliffs. A steep section of this course is slippery and requires care.

The Storr is often climbed as part of a much longer expedition, following the full length of the Trotternish landslip.

== Media and the arts ==
From 1 August to 17 September 2005 one of Britain's single largest environmental artworks was staged on the walk up to Coire Faoin at the base of the Old Man of Storr and the Storr cliffs. Created by NVA, a Scottish environmental arts company, directed by Angus Farquhar (formerly of Test Dept) and designed by a team including "<slight>" and David Bryant from Midnight Design, the work contained music by Geir Jenssen, Paul Mounsey, live performance by Gaelic singer Anne Martin and recordings of the works of Gaelic poet Somhairle MacGill-Eain (Sorley MacLean). This was David Bryant's last major environmental creative work as he died from cancer in 2007. He won a Plasa Lighting Design award in 2006 for his work lighting the Storr.

In October 2009, a photograph taken of the pinnacles looking towards Raasay and South Rona won the "Take a view: Landscape photo of the year 2009".

In January 2012, production of the science-fiction film Prometheus moved to the Isle of Skye, with filming taking place at the Old Man of Storr.

British composer Matthew Taylor composed the orchestral piece Storr, which takes its name and inspiration from the rock formation, which the composer found awe-inspiring on a visit there. Storr was commissioned and premièred by the Essex Symphony Orchestra conducted by Tom Hammond, and given its London première by the Kensington Symphony Orchestra and Russell Keable on 24 June 2013.

== Gallery ==
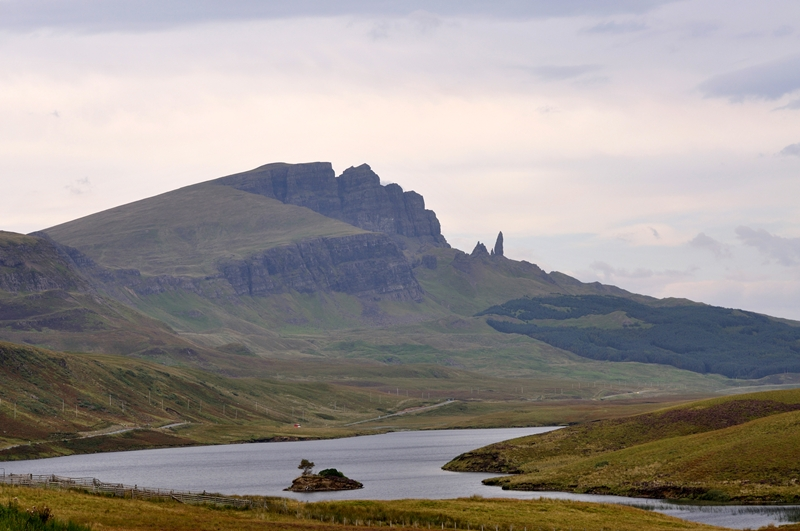
Old Man of Storr and The Storr

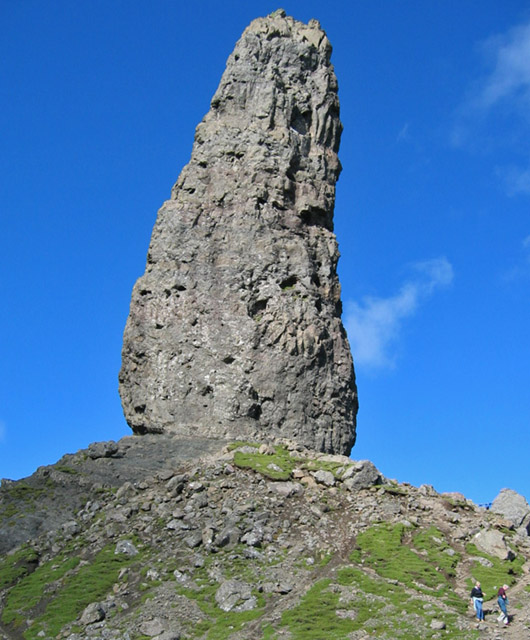
Bodach an Stoir (The Old Man of Storr)

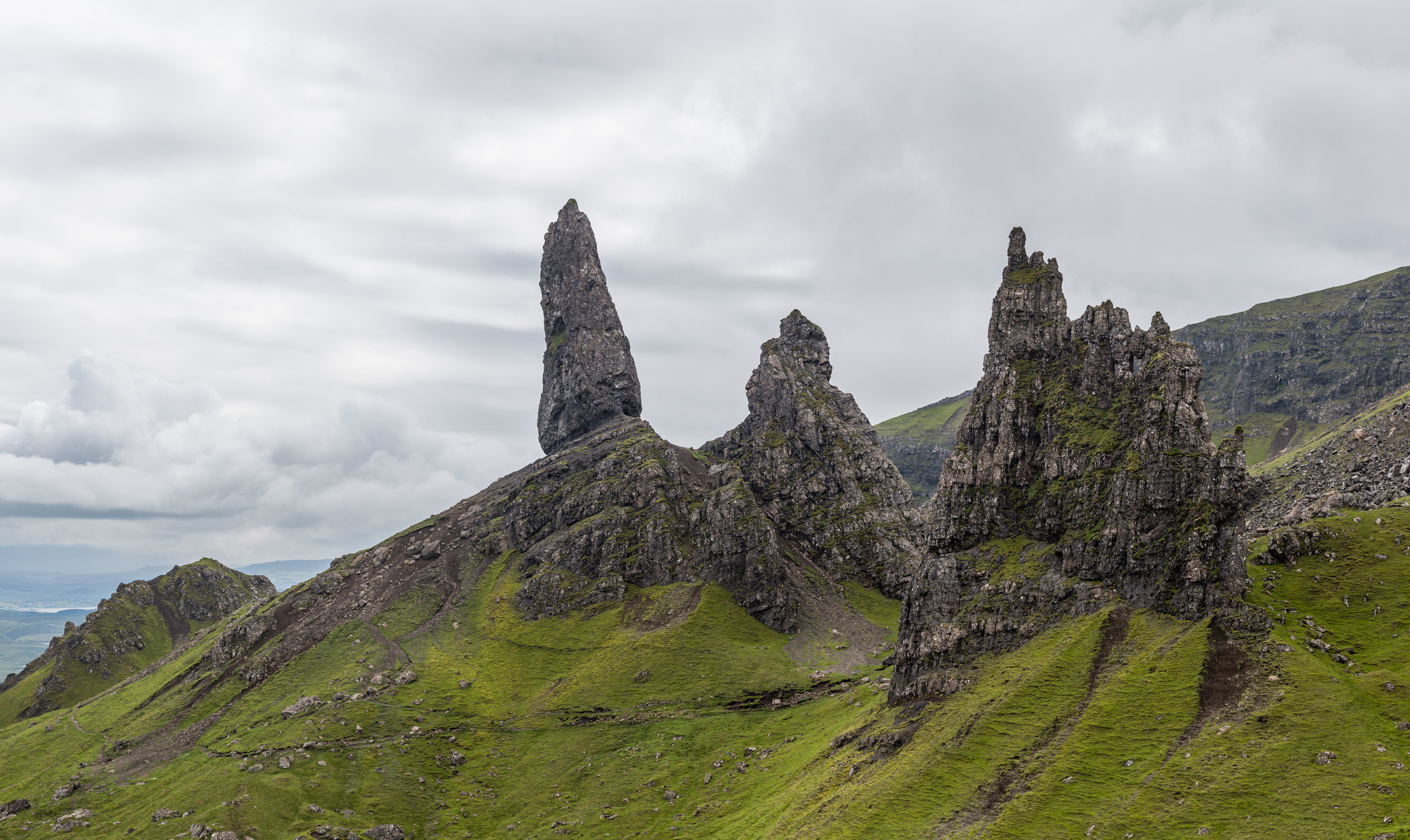
The Old Man of Storr, Skye

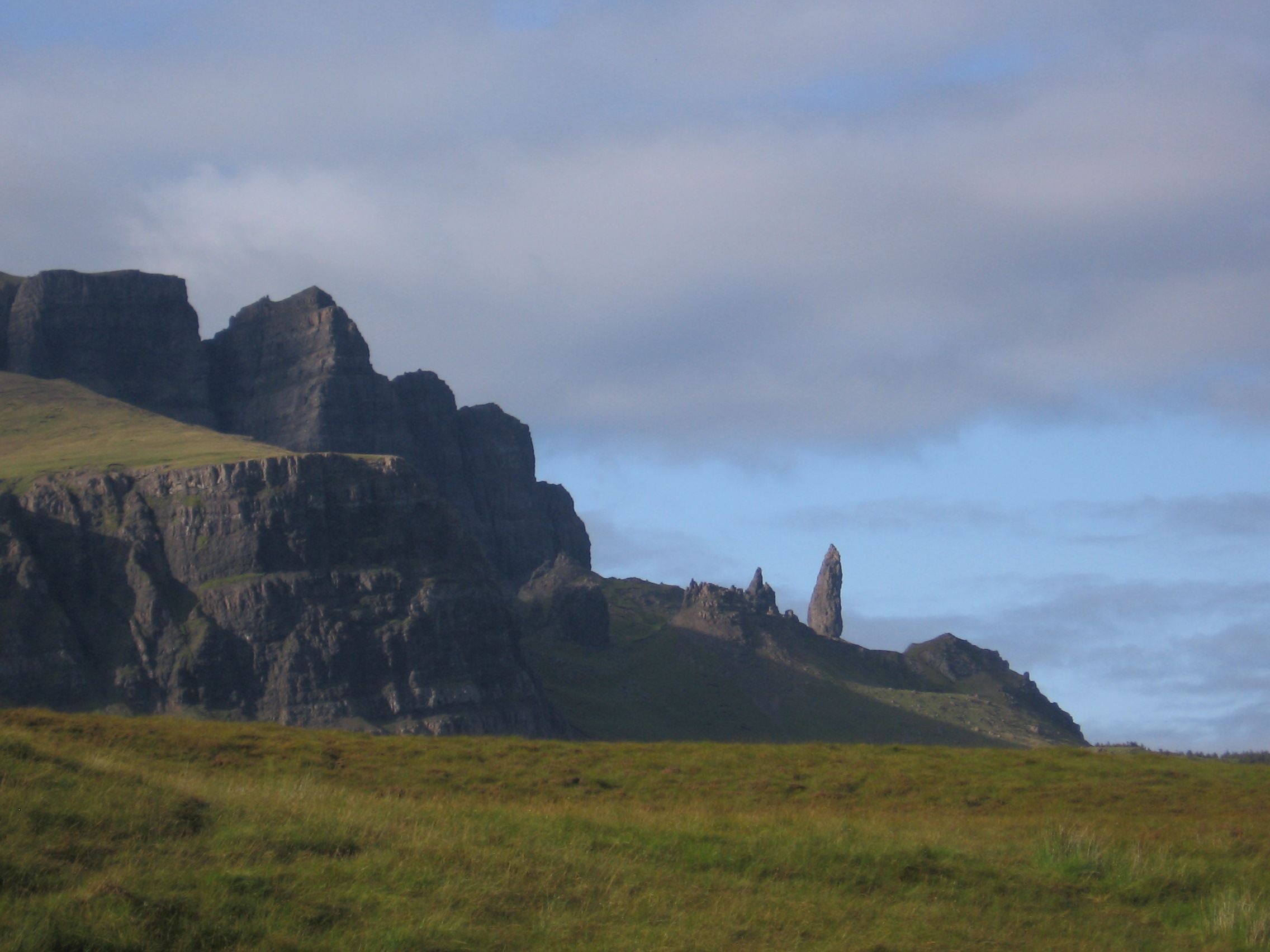
Old Man of Storr 2008, Skye

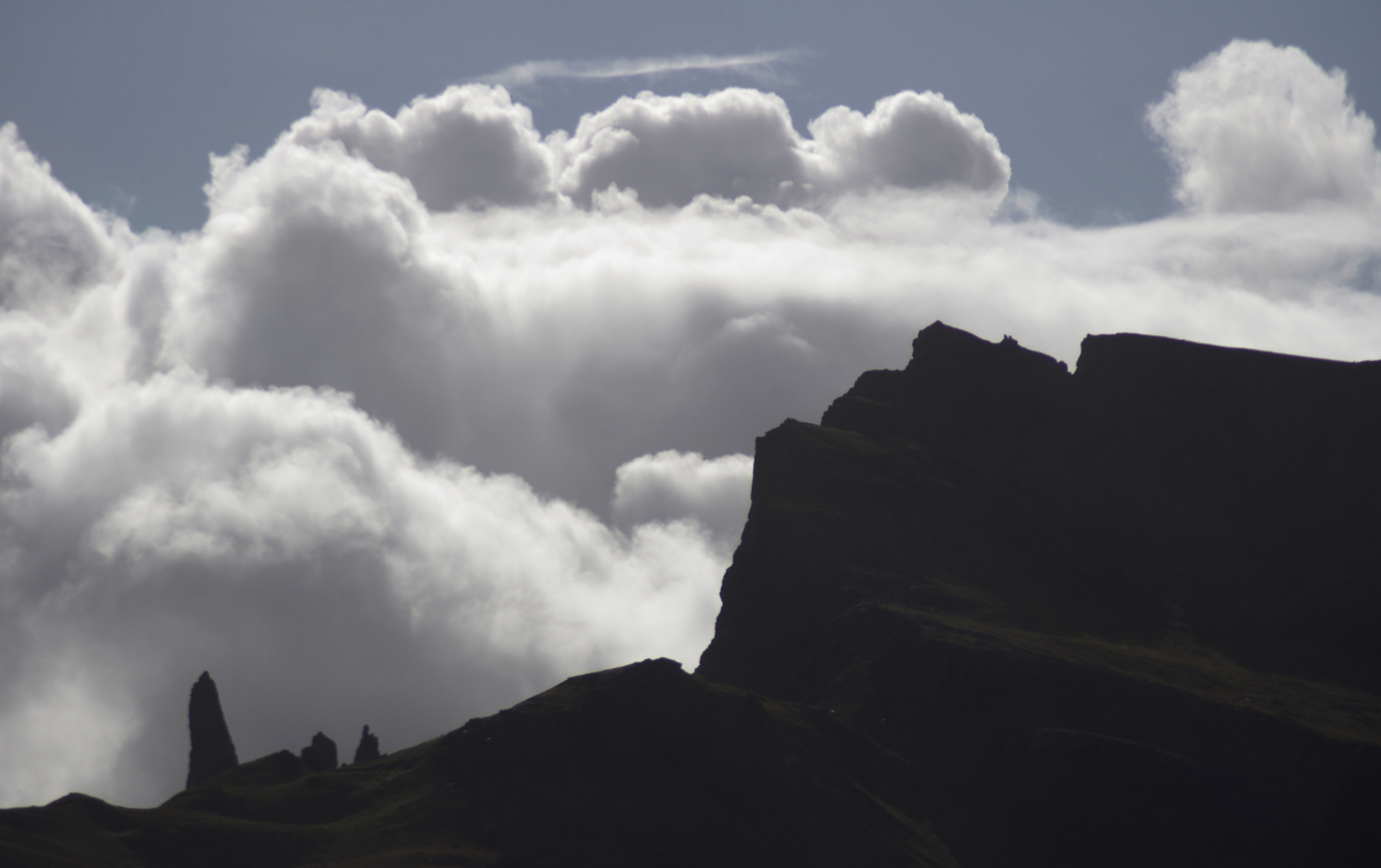
Profile of the Old Man, viewed from the north

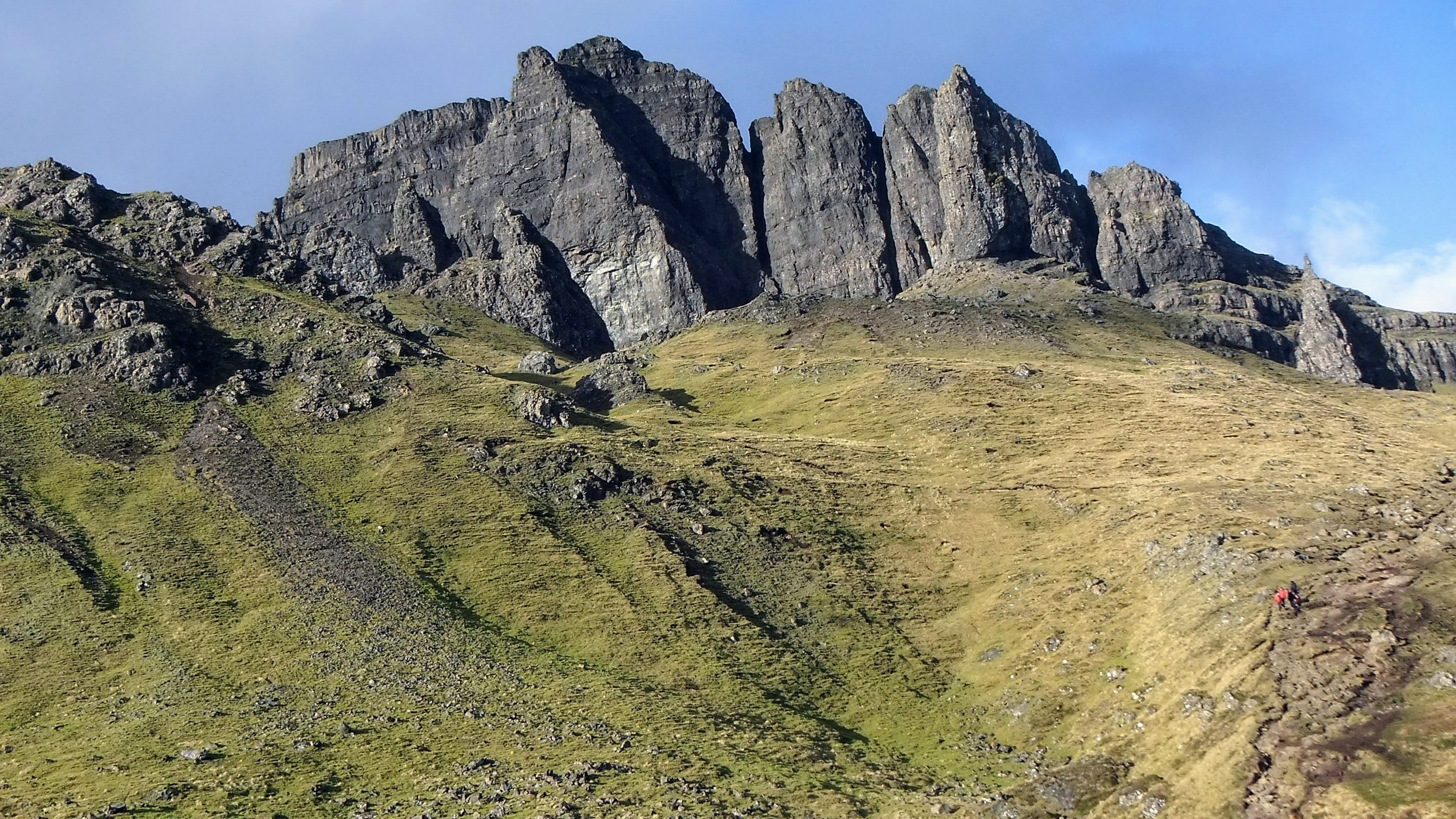
Old Man of Storr from hiking trail
