= Operation Eichmann (film) =

1961 film by R. G. Springsteen

- Theatrical release poster used on the cover of a Warner Archive Collection Blu-ray
- Directed by: R. G. Springsteen
- Written by: Lester Cole
- Produced by: Samuel Bischoff; David Diamond
- Starring: Werner Klemperer; John Banner; Ruta Lee
- Cinematography: Joseph Biroc
- Edited by: Roy V. Livingston
- Production company: Bischoff-Diamond Corporation
- Distributed by: Allied Artists Pictures
- Release dates: March 15, 1961 (Detroit, Michigan)
- Running time: 90 minutes
- Country: United States
- Language: English

Operation Eichmann is a 1961 American crime film directed by R. G. Springsteen, with Werner Klemperer in the title role. It is a highly fictionalized account of the life of the war criminal Adolf Eichmann, from his career as a member of the SS and an architect of the Holocaust to his kidnap in Argentina by the Mossad.

== Plot ==
After orchestrating the "Final Solution to the Jewish problem", when Germany is defeated at the end of WWII, Adolph Eichman utilizes underground networks and escapes to South America. Dissatisfied with his treatment, he attempts to assert his former authority over the organization. Realizing his delusional and dangerous demeanor, he is rebuffed and betrayed, and allowed to be captured by Mossad.

== Cast ==
- Werner Klemperer as Lieutenant Colonel Adolf Eichmann
- Ruta Lee as Anna Kemp, Eichmann's Domestic Partner
- Donald Buka as David, Fictional Israeli Mossad Agent and Holocaust Survivor
- John Banner as Colonel Rudolf Höss, Auschwitz Camp Commander
- Hanna Hertelendy as Tessa, Höss's Wife
- Barbara Turner as Sara, David's Wife and Fellow Holocaust survivor
- Steve Gravers as Jacob, David's Brother-In-Law
- Jimmy Baird as Young David (1941-1945)
- Debbie Cannon as Young Sara (1941-1945)
- Jackie Russo as Young Jacob (1941-1945)
- Oscar Beregi, Jr. as Kuwaiti Police Commissioner
- Luis Van Rooten as SS Police General Heinrich Himmler
- Eric Braeden as Klaus

== Production ==
Filming started 12 January 1961.

== Reception ==
Operation Eichmann received an X-rating in the United Kingdom. Philip K. Scheuer of the Los Angeles Times found this movie painfully distasteful, despite fair suspense. Herb Kelly of The Miami News was disappointed with the movie's shallow nature, specifically its failure to provide any substantial characterization of the evil people it depicted.
