= Die tote Stadt =

1920 opera by Erich Wolfgang Korngold

- Opera by Erich Wolfgang Korngold
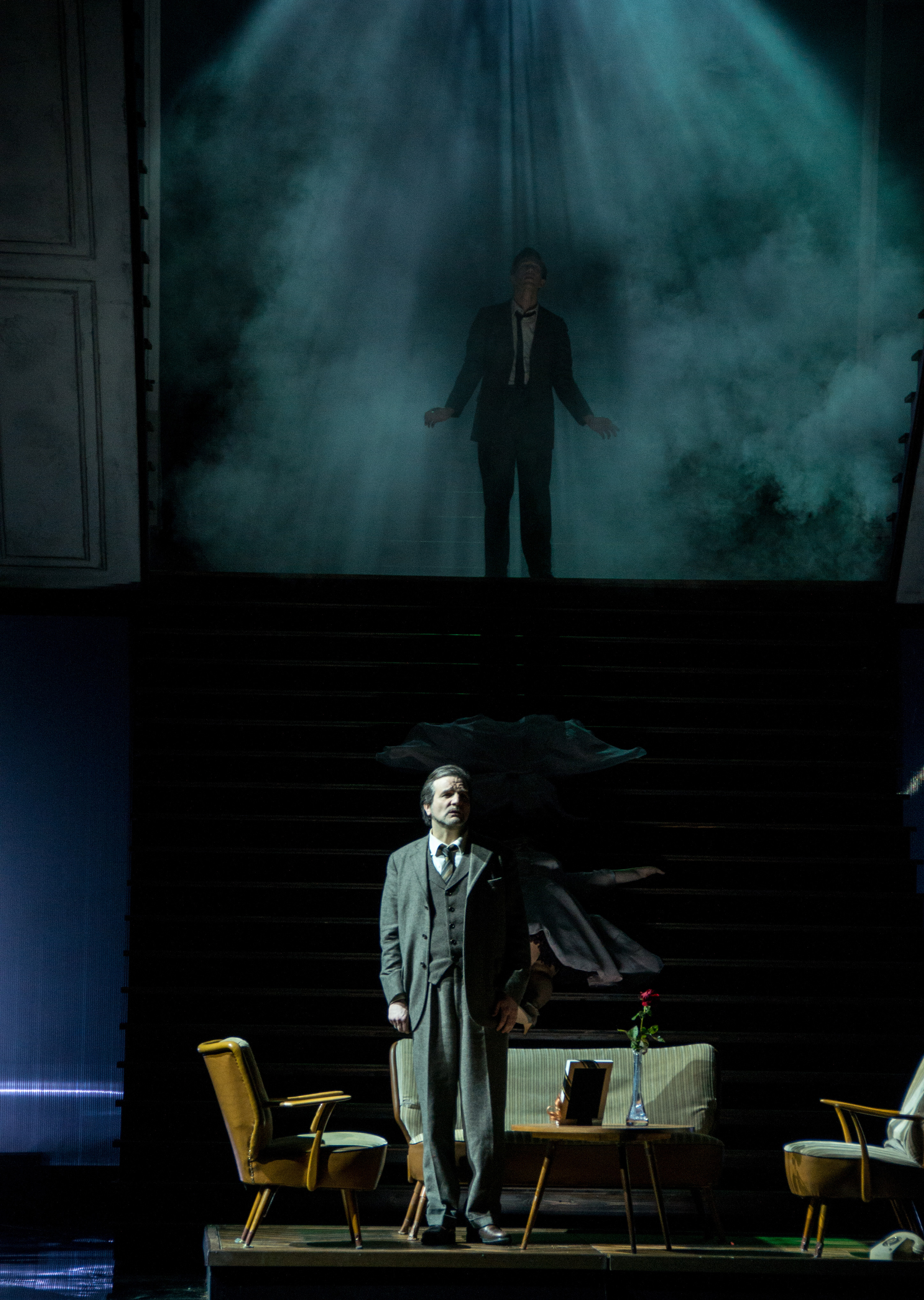
- Scene at the Graz Opera in 2015
- Librettist: Paul Schott
- Language: German
- Based on: Bruges-la-Morte by Georges Rodenbach
- Premiere: 4 December 1920: Hamburg State Opera; Cologne Opera

Die tote Stadt (German for The Dead City), Op. 12, is an opera in three acts by Erich Wolfgang Korngold (1897–1957) set to a libretto by Paul Schott, a collective pseudonym for the composer and his father, Julius Korngold. It premiered in 1920. It is based on the 1892 novel Bruges-la-Morte by Georges Rodenbach.

== Origins ==
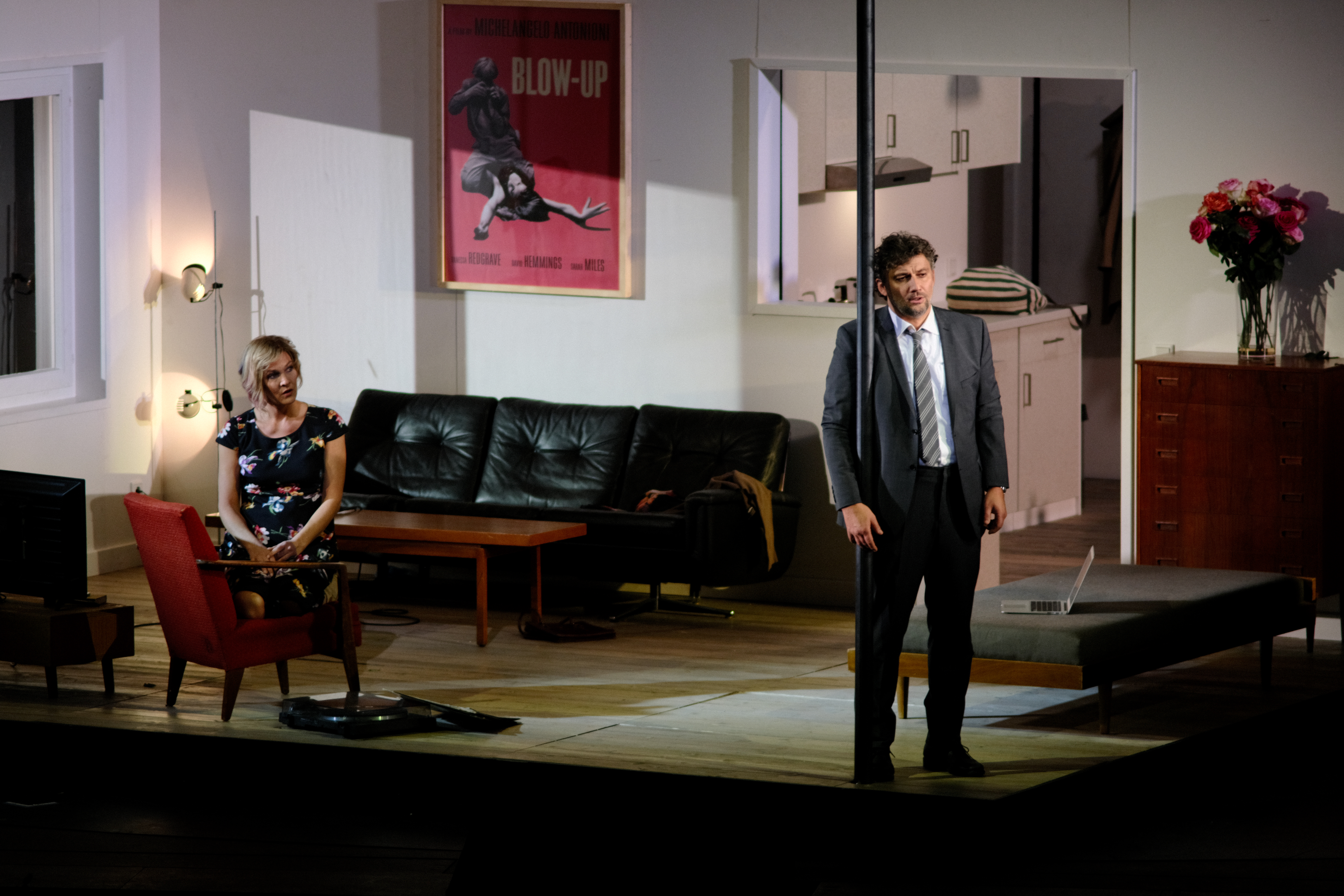
Marlis Petersen, Jonas Kaufmann, 2019 Munich production

Rodenbach's 1892 symbolist catholic cult novel Bruges-la-Morte had already been adapted by the author into a play. The play was translated into German by Siegfried Trebitsch under the title Die stille Stadt (The Silent City), which he later changed to Das Trugbild (The Mirage). Trebitsch was a friend of Korngold's father, Julius. The two met in the street one day and got into a conversation about a possible operatic adaptation. Trebitsch later met Erich, who was enthusiastic about the project. Trebitsch recalled "[I] met the young master Erich Wolfgang Korngold in search of a scenario or, even better, a mood or operatic background that could be dramatically elaborated. I urged him to take up Das Trugbild. Julius commented on the way the project evolved:

As soon as Erich read the play, he drafted a scenario for a one-acter, but Hans Müller urged him to get away from one-act operas and he sketched the first of three acts in prose. However, his work on two of his own plays prevented him from getting much further, and since his prose was wordy and unsingable anyway, we gladly excused him from the task

Father and son decided to adapt the play themselves, and co-wrote the libretto, using the pseudonym Paul Schott. Julius decided to change the plot so that the murder occurs in a dream, rather than in actuality, as in the original. The dream sequence occupies the central part of the opera. Korngold started the composition in 1916. He left it for a year to take up military service before resuming and completing the score. Julius Korngold is quoted as describing it as "modern mixing of reality and fantasy" The opera is dedicated to Dr Ludwig Strecker, owner of the Schott music publishing house which published it.

== Performance history ==
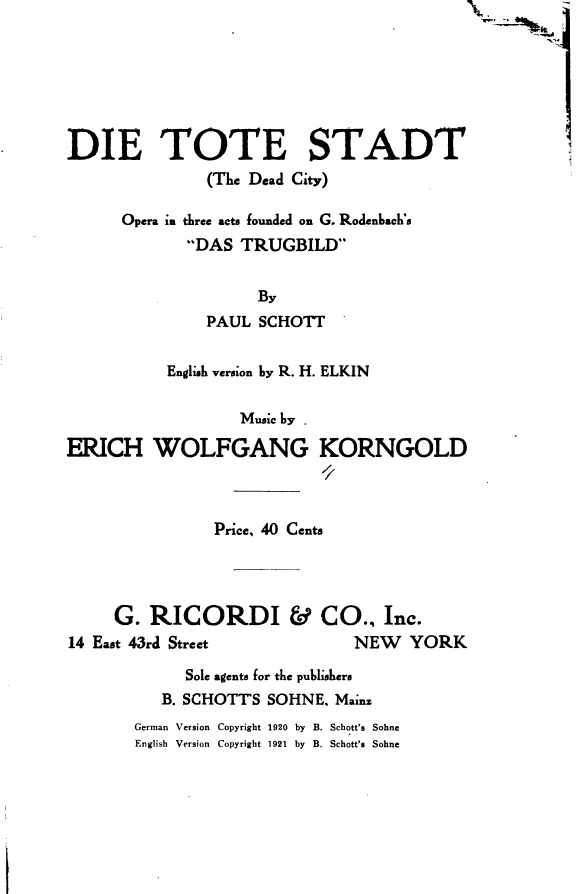
Libretto cover published in 1921

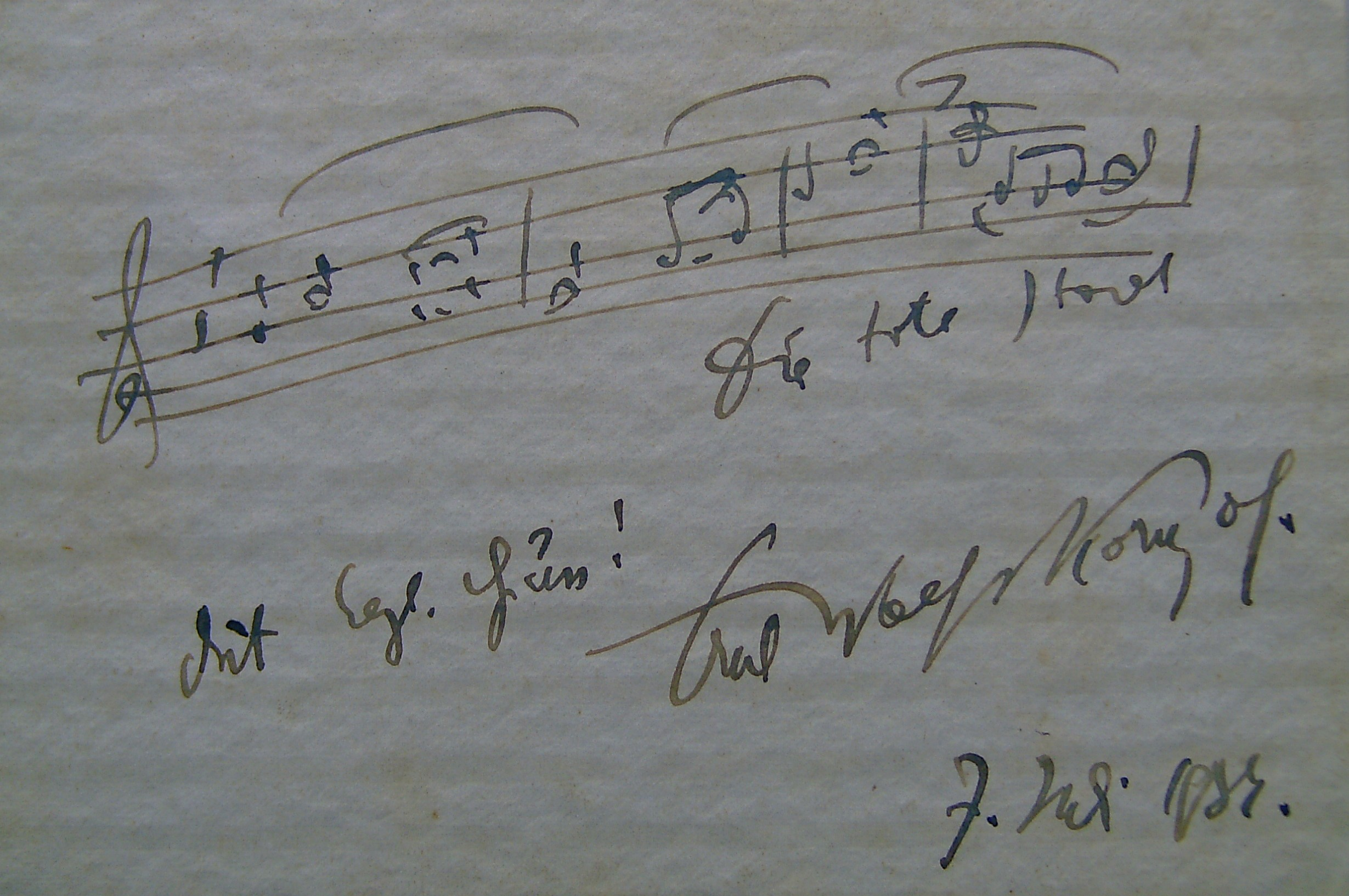
Opera notes with dedication

When Die tote Stadt had its premiere on 4 December 1920, Korngold was just 23 years old with two short one-act operas, Der Ring des Polykrates and Violanta, already to his name. The success of these earlier works was so great that Die tote Stadt was subject to a fierce competition among German theatres for the right to the world premiere. In the end, an unusual double premiere was arranged and the opera opened simultaneously at the Stadttheater Hamburg and in Cologne (Glockengasse). In Cologne, the conductor was Otto Klemperer, and his wife Johanna Geisler sang Marietta. In Hamburg, Korngold himself was in the theatre, and the conductor was Egon Pollak. The opera's theme of life, hope and overcoming the loss of a loved one resonated with contemporary audiences of the 1920s who had just come through the trauma and grief of World War I, and this undoubtedly fuelled the work's popularity in a Vienna, that under Freud's legacy, took dreams seriously.

Die tote Stadt was one of the greatest hits of the 1920s. Within two years of its premiere it had circled the globe, including several performances at the Metropolitan Opera in New York City. The Berlin première was on 12 April 1924 with Lotte Lehmann as Marietta/Marie and Richard Tauber as Paul, conducted by George Szell.

The work was banned in Austria and Germany by the Nazi régime because of Korngold's Jewish ancestry and disappeared after 1931. Even in 1920, the opera's style was considered anachronistic, looking back to Puccini, Richard Strauss and the Viennese operetta tradition. After World War II its late-romanticism was considered dated when compared to modernism and it fell into obscurity, despite a restaging in Munich two years before Korngold's death.

Although the opera's most popular aria and duet "Glück, das mir verlieb" were occasionally heard, it took a revival of interest in tonality and romanticism to rekindle interest in performances of the opera as a whole.

The key post-war revivals of the piece were at the Vienna Volksoper (1967), the New York City Opera (1975) and Berlin in the 1980s. The 1990s witnessed a revival with some 70 performances, and in 2020 alone there were that many. In the early 2000s the work has enjoyed notable revivals, among others at the Theater Bonn, the Royal Opera House, the San Francisco Opera, the Vienna State Opera, the Finnish National Opera in 2010 and the Bavarian State Opera in 2020. A number of performances have been recorded for DVD.

The French premiere of the opera took place in a concert performance in 1982 at the Paris Théâtre des Champs-Élysées. The first French staged performance was in April 2001 in Strasbourg under the baton of Jan Latham-Koenig with Torsten Kerl (Paul) and Angela Denoke (Marietta). The opera received its UK premiere on 14 January 1996 in a concert performance by the Kensington Symphony Orchestra conducted by Russell Keable at the Queen Elizabeth Hall, with Ian Caley (Paul), Christine Teare (Marie/Marietta) and the Elysian Singers of London. The first UK staged performance was on 27 January 2009 at the Royal Opera House, Covent Garden. The opera was first staged in English by English National Opera in March 2023, directed by Annilese Miskimmon and conducted by Kirill Karabits.

The opera was first performed in Latin America at Teatro Colón in Buenos Aires, Argentina, on September 19, 1999, with Carlos Bengolea as Paul, Cynthia Makris as Marie/Marietta and David Pittman-Jennings as Frank; Stefan Lano was the conductor.

In Australia, the work was first premiered by Opera Australia on 30 June 2012 at the Sydney Opera House, with Cheryl Barker as Marie/Marietta, and Stefan Vinke as Paul, conducted by Christian Badea, directed by Bruce Beresford. In 1986, Beresford directed the episode "Glück, das mir verblieb" of Aria.

Opera Colorado opened a new production directed by Chas Rader-Shieber, designed by Robert Perdziola, and conducted by music director Ari Pelto on 26 February 2023 at the Ellie Caulkins Opera House. It featured Jonathan Burton as Paul, Sara Gartland as Marie/Marietta (staging), Kara Shay Thomson as Marie/Marietta (vocals), Daniel Belcher as Frank/Fritz, and Elizabeth Bishop as Brigitta.

According to Leon Botstein, the revival is associated with a broader reconsideration of 20th-century music, both academically and in performance, stating in 2020 "I was brought up in a time when Korngold was considered a minor figure, a kind of lingering late Romantic who had an ambivalent or perhaps an even hostile sense of the modern ...nobody took this stuff seriously until recently."

Paul's role is considered particularly demanding, with many high B♭s and A naturals.

== Roles ==
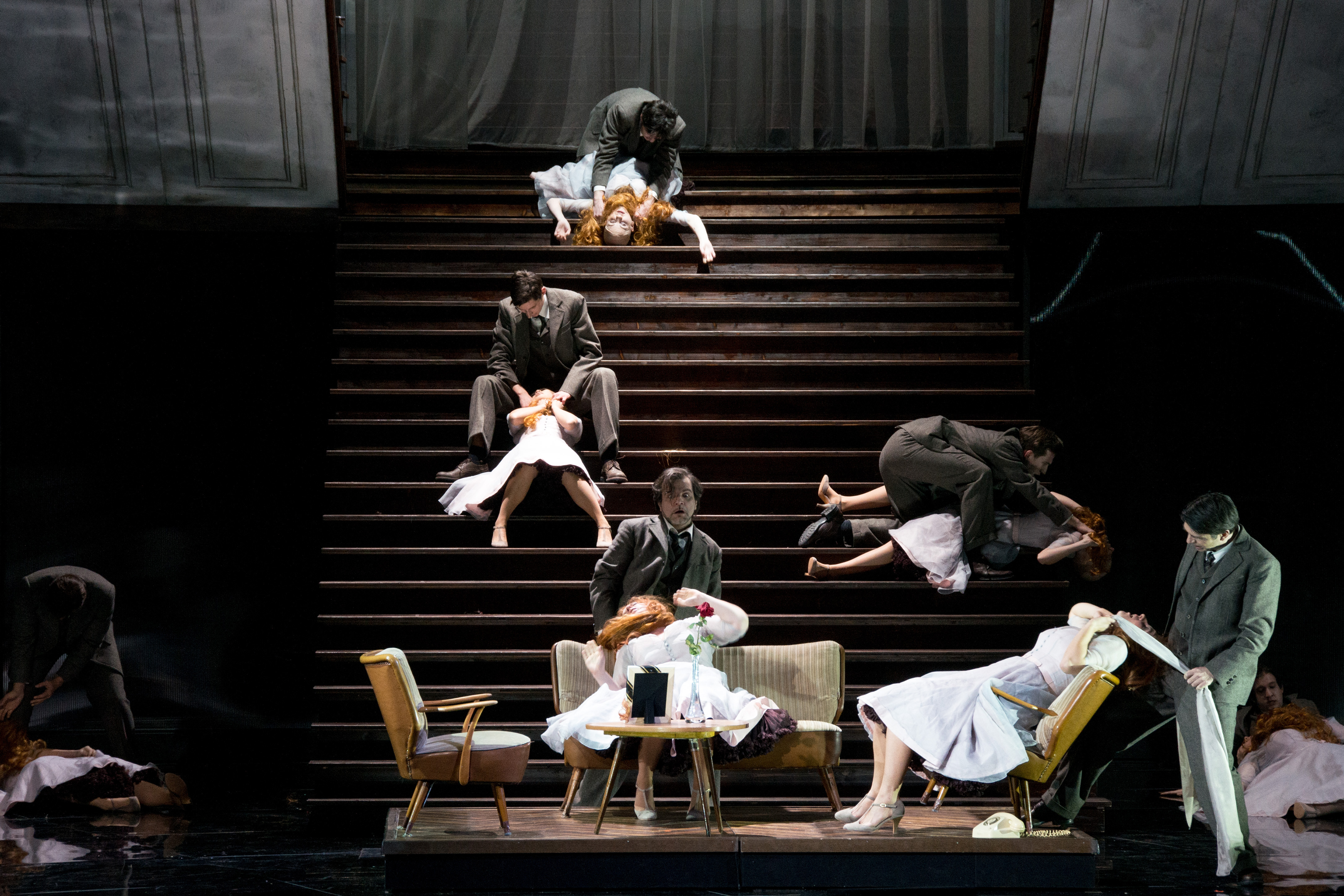
Graz Opera 2015

Roles, voice types, premiere casts
Role	Voice type	Premiere cast in Hamburg, 4 December 1920, Conductor: Egon Pollak	Premiere cast in Cologne, 4 December 1920, Conductor: Otto Klemperer
Paul/Gaston/Victorin/Albert	tenor	Richard Schubert	Karl Schröder
Marie/Marietta	soprano	Annie Münchow	Johanna Klemperer
Juliette	soprano	Maria Jeritza	Johanna Klemperer
Brigitta/Lucienne	mezzo-soprano	Maria Olszewska	Katherina Rohr
Frank-Fritz	baritone	Josef Degler	Karl Renner
Chorus: partygoers

== Synopsis ==
Place: Bruges, Belgium, called the Dead City (die tote Stadt) for its pious gloom
Time: End of 19th century
Background: Paul lives in his house in Bruges where his young wife, Marie, had died some years before. The gothic image of the city with its long abandoned waterways, churches and cloisters provides a mystical background to the opera, with its themes of past memories and images of afterlife.

Paul has not come to terms with the reality of her death. He keeps a Kirche des Gewesenen (Temple of the Past) in her honor, a locked room including keepsakes, including photographs, a lute, and a lock of her hair. Until the action of the opera begins, no one had been in the room except him and his housekeeper Brigitta. Brigitta and Paul's friend Frank are concerned about his continuing obsession with his dead wife's memory and in particular his fetishism about her hair, which he had removed and kept.
Structure: The opera is in three acts, each divided into a prelude and scenes.

=== Act 1 (in six scenes) ===
Brigitta is showing the locked room to Frank, an old friend of Paul's, who is in Bruges on a visit. She explains that only the day before, Paul had unexpectedly announced the room could be open again. Paul arrives, excitedly insisting that Marie still lives. He tells Frank that the day before he met a woman on the streets of Bruges who exactly resembles Marie (indeed, Paul wants to believe she is Marie resurrected) and has invited her back to his home. Frank leaves, promising to return shortly. The woman, whose name is Marietta, appears for her rendezvous with Paul. She is in Bruges as a dancer in an opera company performing Meyerbeer's Robert le diable, in which she plays the part of Helena. She invites him to come to the theatre to see her dance. Without explaining his motivation, he gives her a scarf to put on and a lute, recreating a photograph of Marie. He asks her to sing a song that Marie used to sing (Lute Song, "Glück, das mir verblieb" – Happiness with me remains), joining in on the second verse, which ends with the words Glaub, es gibt ein Auferstehen (believe, there is a resurrection). They hear some of her opera company colleagues pass by in the street. Marietta wants to go wave at them but Paul stops her, fearing scandal if the neighbors should see her in his rooms. She dances for him ("O Tanz, o Rausch") – Oh dance, oh bliss), but breaks off with the excuse that she must leave for rehearsal, hinting that he might seek and find her again. Paul meanwhile is driven into a state of extreme anxiety.

Torn between his loyalty to Marie and his interest in Marietta he collapses into a chair and begins to hallucinate. He sees Marie's ghost step out of her portrait. She urges him to admit he is tempted by the other woman.

=== Act 2 (in four scenes) ===
From this point in the story until almost the end of the opera, the events are all part of a vision taking place in Paul's mind.

It is a moonlit evening. Paul is standing alongside a canal, outside the solitary house where Marietta lives. The door is locked. He has given in to his passion for her, though he views it as a sin. A group of nuns passes, among whom is Brigitta dressed as a novice. She tells Paul that she has left him because of his sin and passes on. Frank appears, and Paul realizes that they are rivals for Marietta's affection when Frank shows him he has the key to her house. Paul seizes the key from him and Frank passes on. Paul retreats to watch from a distance as boats come down the canal, bearing members of the opera company, among them Viktorin (the stage manager), Fritz (the Pierrot), Count Albert (a wealthy hanger-on) as well as others who all come off the boats. Viktorin sings a serenade to the still unseen Marietta. Marietta herself then appears and explains that she missed the rehearsal because she was not in the mood for it and had slipped away. She flirts with the Count, and it is suggested may be having an affair with Gaston. At her request, Fritz sings a nostalgic song ("Mein Sehnen, mein Wähnen" – My yearnings, my fantasies). Marietta proposes that they rehearse the notorious ballet from Robert le diable in which nuns rise seductively from their graves, with herself as the head nun Helena. As they begin the enactment, Paul can bear it no longer and comes out of hiding to confront the group. Marietta defuses the situation by sending the others away. They have a tense quarrel during which Marietta finally realizes that Paul's obsession with her stems from her resemblance to his dead wife. She insists that he love her for herself; they go together to Paul's house where she intends to break the hold of the dead Marie.

=== Act 3 (in three scenes) ===
Paul's vision continues. Back in his house, where he and Marietta have spent the night, it is the morning of a religious festival, the Procession of the Holy Blood which is held on Ascension Day in Bruges. Paul watches the festival procession from a window in the Temple of the Past, but does not want Marietta alongside him for fear someone outside should see them together. Marietta confronts Marie, suggesting she leave. In his anxiety Paul imagines the procession is passing through the room. Marietta is increasingly impatient and starts to taunt him by dancing seductively while stroking his dead wife's hair. In a rage, Paul grabs the lock of hair and strangles Marietta with it. Staring at her dead body, he exclaims "Now she is exactly like Marie."

Paul awakens from his vision and as he recognizes the real world around him, he is astonished that Marietta's body is nowhere to be found. Brigitta enters and informs him that Marietta has come back to pick up her umbrella which she left at the house when she departed just a few minutes earlier. Marietta enters, retrieves her umbrella and departs just as Frank returns as he had promised in Act I. Paul tells Frank he will not see Marietta again. Frank announces he is leaving Bruges, and asks if Paul will come too, to which he replies, "I will try". The opera ends with Paul's reprise of "Glück, das mir verblieb", with the last words now "Here, there is no resurrection". He realises that through his dream it is time to leave Marie and move on. Paul gives the room a farewell glance as the curtain falls.

== Analysis ==
According to Juliane Luster and Simon Stone (director of the 2019 Munich production), Die tote Stadt includes a number of themes, including grief, dreams, love, fidelity and suppressed sexuality but underlying all of these is denial and a message that trauma is best dealt with in the short term. The longer a character, such as Paul, runs away from, rather than confronting death, the more damaging the trauma is and the more incapable that character is of forming normal relationships.

Julius Korngold describes the appearance of Marietta as a divine intervention, and the central Traumvision (dream sequence) in which the agitated Paul transfers his emotions from his dead wife to the dancer, as a device that guards him from dangerous disillusionment. The vision, with the dancer's orgiastic movements, enables him to grasp Marietta's real nature but also the Totenvergötterung (mortuary cult) in which he has become entrapped. It is his dead wife, who seemingly calls on him zu schauen und zu erkennen (to look and understand). At the end, Paul is now freed from his delusional state – Wie weit soll unsere Trauer gehen, wie weit darf sie es, ohn' uns zu entwurzeln? Schmerzlicher Zwiespalt des Gefühls (How far should we give way to our grief, how far dare, without disaster, painful conflict of feelings). He finally comes to accept that there is no resurrection in this life – hier gibt es kein Auferstehn.

== Instrumentation ==
Die tote Stadt is scored for:

- woodwinds: 3 flutes (2nd and 3rd doubling piccolo), 2 oboes, cor anglais, 2 clarinets (A, B♭), bass clarinet (A, B♭), 2 bassoons, contrabassoon
- brass: 4 horns, 3 trumpets, bass trumpet, 3 trombones, bass tuba
- percussion: timpani, snare drum, military drum, triangle, cymbals, bass drum, xylophone, glockenspiel, tam-tam, tambourine, rute, ratchet, celesta, piano, harmonium
- strings: 2 harps, violins I, II, violas, cellos, double bass
- on-stage: organ, 2 E♭ clarinets, 2 trumpets, 7 low-pitch bells, triangle, cymbals, tambourine, military drum, bass drum, wind machine
- off-stage: 2 trumpets, trombones

== Recordings ==
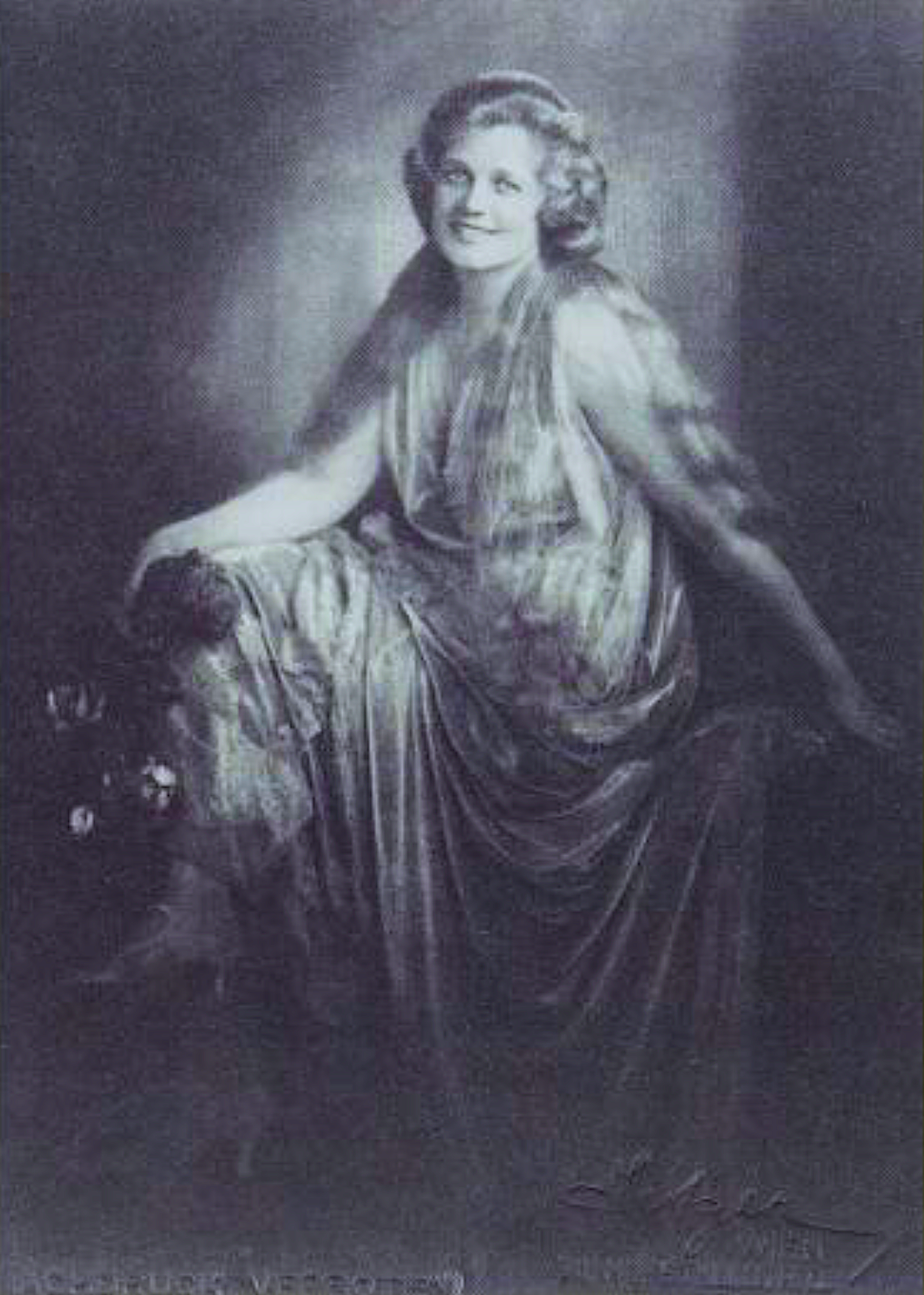
Maria Jeritza as Juliette in Die tote stadt at the Metropolitan Opera in 1921

- C. 1924: Among the oldest recordings of the score are three sides made for Odeon Records by Lotte Lehmann, Richard Tauber and George Szell soon after the Berlin premiere in April 1924; Maria Jeritza and Maria Nemeth, both involved in early performances of the opera, have also left recordings of the "Lute Song", while Karl Hammes and Richard Mayr, among the first to sing Fritz, recorded the "Pierrotlied" ("Mein Sehnen, mein Wähnen") from act 2.
- 1952: Bayerischer Rundfunk studio production, available from Opera Today which includes Maud Cunitz and Karl Friedrich, Fritz Lehmann conducting
- 1975: RCA Victor recording, with Carol Neblett, René Kollo, Hermann Prey, and Benjamin Luxon, conducted by Erich Leinsdorf, RCA Victor CD 87767, recorded in Studio 1 des Bayerischen Rundfunks im Münchner Funkhaus in June 1975
- 1983: Deutsche Oper Berlin, with James King, Karan Armstrong, and William Murray, conducted by Heinrich Hollreiser, and directed by Götz Friedrich (DVD: Arthaus Musik 101 656)
- 1996: Royal Swedish Opera Chorus and Orchestra, conducted by Leif Segerstam, with Katarina Dalayman, Ingrid Tobiasson, Thomas Sunnegårdh, Anders Bergström, live in Stockholm, on Naxos
- 2001: Torsten Kerl, Angela Denoke and the Orchestre philharmonique de Strasbourg, conducted by Jan Latham-Koenig, Opéra national du Rhin 2001, (DVD: Arthaus Musik 100 343)
- 2003: Franz Welser-Möst, Emily Magee (Marietta / Die Erscheinung Mariens), Cornelia Kallisch (Brigitta), Norbert Schmittberg (Paul), Olaf Bär (Frank / Fritz), live in Zurich, EMI
- 2004: Donald Runnicles, Angela Denoke (Marietta / Die Erscheinung Mariens), Daniela Denschlag (Brigitta), Torsten Kerl (Paul), Bo Skovhus (Frank / Fritz), live in Salzburg, Orfeo
- 2009: Sebastian Weigle and the Frankfurter Opern- und Museumsorchester recorded the opera live in November 2009 for Oehms Classics.
- 2009: Teatro La Fenice in Venice, with Stefan Vinke, Solveig Kringelborn, and Stephan Genz, conducted by Eliahu Inbal, staged and designed by Pier Luigi Pizzi (DVD: Dynamic)
- 2010: Finnish National Opera, with Klaus Florian Vogt, Camilla Nylund, and Markus Eiche, conducted by Mikko Franck, staged by Kasper Holten, designed by Es Devlin (DVD: Opus Arte 2013); same production as performed at New National Theatre Tokyo (March 2014) with Torsten Kerl and Meagan Miller (TV: NHK Premium Theater: 12 May 2014)
- 2021 BD and DVD release of Bayerische Staatsoper's 2019 production, conducted by Kirill Petrenko and staged by Simon Stone, with Jonas Kaufmann (Paul), Marlis Petersen (Marietta), released by Bayerische Staatsoper Recordings (BSOREC2001).
