= Johanna Geisler =

German operatic soprano (1888–1956)

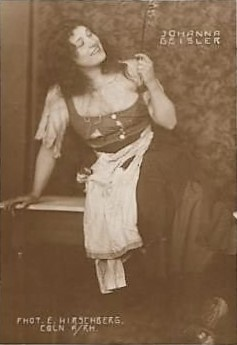
- Photo postcard of Geisler at the Cologne opera, 1920s
- Born: Johanne Elisabeth Meyer; 28 May 1888; Hanover, German Empire
- Died: 3 November 1956 (aged 68); Munich, Bavaria, West Germany
- Occupation: Operatic soprano
- Organizations: Hofoper Hannover; Mainz municipal theatre; Cologne Opera; Kroll Oper
- Spouse: Otto Klemperer (m. 1919)
- Children: 3, including Werner Klemperer

Johanna Geisler, or Geissler (born Johanne Elisabeth Meyer; 28 May 1888 – 3 November 1956), was a German operatic soprano and stage actress. She also appeared as Johanna Klemperer and under stage names Johanna Klee and Hanne Klee. She began her career as a member of the opera chorus of the Hofoper Hannover in 1903, and had a solo engagement at the Mainz Municipal Theatre from 1912. She moved on to the Cologne Opera where she met her future husband, the conductor Otto Klemperer. With him, she performed lead roles including Marietta in the world premiere of Korngold's Die tote Stadt in 1920. She followed him to the Kroll Oper in Berlin in 1927. When he had to leave Germany in 1933, she and the children followed, to Zürich, to Los Angeles from 1935 to 1947, then Budapest, and finally Zürich again.

== Life and career ==
Johanne Elisabeth Meyer was born in Hanover on 28 May 1888, the daughter of seamstress Sofie Dora Meyer. She was raised by elderly poor foster parents by the name of Geisler, and she took their name. She sang in a church choir as a child, where she was recommended to volunteer at the theatre chorus. From 1902, at age 14 she was a paid chorus singer of the Hofoper Hannover. She was able to present 14 parts from opera choruses in an audition. Her contract called for readiness to perform a new part within three days, and required her to supply her own costumes. Her voice was trained by O. Suesse and Clara Schroeder-Kaminsky. She left her foster parents a year later, and moved to the Theater Dessau in 1905 and the Theatre in Wiesbaden the following year, singing in the opera chorus. In 1906, at age 18, she gave birth to a daughter, Carla, whose father, an officer, was not willing to marry her. Her widowed foster mother moved in with her. Unlike her own mother, Geisler raised her daughter herself, but passed her in society as her little sister. A second child, born when she was 21, died shortly afterwards. In Wiesbaden she occasionally sang small solo roles, of servants and maids.

=== Mainz ===
With the 1912/13 season, Geisler became a member of the Mainz Municipal Theatre, now engaged as a soloist. Beginning as a soubrette in opera and operetta, she developed a coloratura soprano repertoire. She sang both minor and larger roles, such as Papagena in Mozart's Die Zauberflöte and the title role in Jarno's operetta Die Försterchristl, participating in Wagner's Götterdämmerung and Nicolai's Die lustigen Weiber von Windsor. The theatre's records show her busy in 23 of the 44 productions of the 1915/16 season alone. Her last performance there was appearing as all three women Hoffmann loves in Offenbach's Hoffmanns Erzählungen.

=== Cologne ===
On 1 September 1916, Geisler began at the Cologne Opera, where she was successful in roles such as the Queen of the Night in Mozart's Die Zauberflöte, Micaela in Bizet's Carmen and Zerbinetta in Ariadne auf Naxos by Richard Strauss. In 1917 Otto Klemperer conducted Beethoven's Fidelio in Cologne, with her as Marzelline. In the winter of 1918, she had a relationship with the baritone Friedrich Schorr, which was close enough for him to expect her to marry him. Klemperer, born into a Jewish family, converted to the Catholic Church. He spent the Holy Week of 1919 at Maria Laach Abbey, where he composed a setting of the mass, Missa sacra. Geisler visited him there.

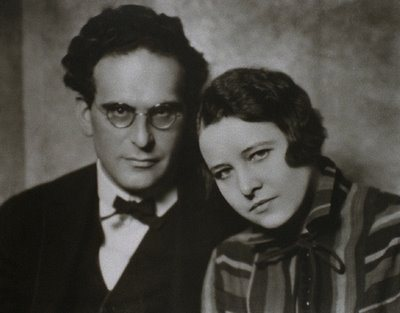
Johanna Geisler and Otto Klemperer, c. 1920

It is unknown when they decided to get married. Marianne Klemperer, the conductor's sister, described her as with "a very lively face with expressive nose and lips, but not particularly slender", and later "she must have nerves of steel, she has a lot of humour and is very jolly". They married on 16 June 1919 in a Jesuit chapel in Cologne, with a small group of family and friends attending, including the philosopher Max Scheler. After the ceremony, they performed together in a private rehearsal of the Missa sacra at the Gürzenich. The couple had two children, Werner, born in 1920, who became an actor, and Lotte, born in 1923.

With her husband as chief conductor in Cologne, she appeared in leading roles of a broad repertoire including Mozart's Despina in Così fan tutte, Susanna, Cherubino and the Countess in Le nozze di Figaro, and Donna Elvira in Don Giovanni. She was very successful as Marietta in the world premiere of Korngold's Die tote Stadt on 4 December 1920, an opera that had a simultaneous premiere at the Hamburg Opera. In 1921 she appeared at the Berlin State Opera in Die Vögel by Walter Braufels. In the second world premiere conducted by Klemperer in Cologne, Zemlinsky's Der Zwerg on 28 May 1922, she had a minor role. She was the soprano soloist when Klemperer conducted the first public performance of his Missa sacra on 13 May 1923. A reviewer noted that she "astonishingly mastered the exorbitantly difficult first soprano part" ("... den exorbitant schweren ersten Sopranpart erstaunlich beherrschte"). In July 1927 she performed, as Johanna Klemperer, the leading role of Hèlene in the world premiere of Hindemith's short opera Hin und zurück at the Baden-Baden Music Festival.

=== Berlin ===
When Otto Klemperer moved to the Kroll Oper in Berlin, in 1927, she became a member of the ensemble. She performed there, sometimes using the pseudonym Hanne Klee, roles including Susanna, Donna Elvira, Marzelline, Verdi's Luisa Miller, Marie in Smetana's The Bartered Bride, Puccini's Madama Butterfly, Hindemith's Hèlene again, and Adele in Die Fledermaus by Johann Strauss. A reviewer of Die Fledermaus noted: "Her singing and acting skills combine to form an inseparable whole and a unified and first-class performance" ("Gesang und schauspielerisches Können vereinigen sich bei ihr zu einem untrennbaren Ganzen und zu einer einheitlichen und erstklassigen Leistung"). She also performed at the Große Volksbühne, in roles such as Gilda in Verdi's Rigoletto and Adele. She toured with a company named Deutsche Musikbühne as Mozart's Countess and the Witch in Humperdinck's Hänsel und Gretel to Leipzig, Trier, Riga and Reval. Her natural voice, never professionally trained, weakened, also due to her "incautious willingness" to take a wide range of heavy roles. She rarely performed after a vocal crisis.

Geisler had shown talent for acting early, and therefore had performed not only solo roles from the chorus, but also acted in dramas. In 1928 she performed as Amalie in Schiller's Die Räuber at the Theater Coburg. In 1929 she had a small role in Wilhelm Dieterle's last silent film, Ludwig der Zweite, König von Bayern.

=== Exile ===
Under the Nazi regime, Geisler's family had to leave Germany. They moved to Zürich, Switzerland, in 1933, and in 1935 to the U.S. after Klemperer accepted the offer to become chief conductor of the Los Angeles Symphony. They returned to Europe in 1947, where he was director of the Hungarian State Opera until 1950. In the 1950s, the family settled in Zürich again.

Johanna Klemperer died in a hospital in Munich on 3 November 1956. The last time she heard her husband conducting was in hospital over the radio on 19 October, when he led the Bavarian Radio Symphony Orchestra. They played Haydn's Symphony No. 101 "The Clock" and Mahler's Symphony No. 4, with the soprano solo "Wir genießen die himmlischen Freuden" (We enjoy Heavenly bliss). Bach's "Bist du bei mir" and "Wenn ich einmal soll scheiden" were performed at her funeral.

== Legacy ==
The only recording of Geisler's voice dates to 1932 when she performed in a broadcast of Julius Bittner's Das höllisch Gold as the Old Woman, conducted by Erich Kleiber. The recording is only partially preserved. In 1983, her youngest daughter published a book about her mother's youth up to her marriage to Klemperer in 1919, Die Personalakten der Johanna Geisler. Eva Weissweiler wrote a biography of Otto Klemperer, published in 2010, which also covered his relationship with his wife, who is described as a "great singer and loyal companion" ("großartige Sängerin und treue Gefährtin").
