= Werner Klemperer =

American actor (1920–2000)

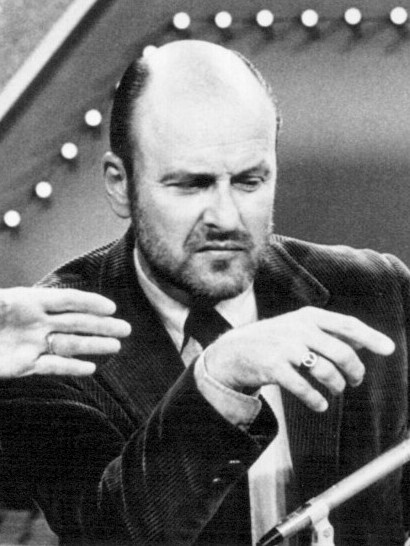
- Klemperer in 1971
- Born: March 22, 1920; Cologne, Germany
- Died: December 6, 2000 (aged 80); New York City, U.S.
- Occupation: Actor
- Years active: 1947–1995
- Spouses: Janet Riley (m. 1950; div. 1959); Susan Dempsay (m. 1959; div. 1968); Louise Troy (m. 1969; div. 1975); Kim Hamilton (m. 1997)
- Children: 2
- Parents: Otto Klemperer; Johanna Geisler

Werner Klemperer (March 22, 1920 – December 6, 2000) was an American actor. He was best known for playing Colonel Wilhelm Klink on the CBS television sitcom Hogan's Heroes, for which he twice won the award for Outstanding Supporting Actor in a Comedy Series at the Primetime Emmy Awards in 1968 and 1969.

Klemperer served in the United States Army during World War II, then began performing on the Broadway stage in 1947. He appeared in several films during his early acting career, such as The Wrong Man (1956), Judgment at Nuremberg (1961), and Houseboat (1958), and he had numerous roles on television shows such as Alfred Hitchcock Presents (1956), Perry Mason (1957), Maverick (1957), Gunsmoke (1958), The Untouchables (1960), and Have Gun – Will Travel (1961), prior to his Hogan's Heroes role.

== Early life ==
Klemperer was born in Cologne, Germany, to a musical family, but he said that he had little musical aptitude. His father was renowned orchestra conductor Otto Klemperer and his mother was soprano Johanna Geisler. He had a younger sister named Lotte (1923–2003). His father was Jewish by birth; he converted to Catholicism but later returned to Judaism. His mother was Lutheran. His grandfather was part of the Jewish community in Prague, and his grandmother was a Sephardic Jew from Hamburg, Germany. Otto Klemperer was a first cousin of Victor Klemperer.

The Klemperer family emigrated to the United States in 1933, settling in Los Angeles, where Otto Klemperer became conductor of the Los Angeles Philharmonic (1933–1939). Werner Klemperer began acting as a student at University High School and enrolled in acting courses at the Pasadena Playhouse before joining the United States Army to serve in World War II. While stationed in Hawaii, he joined the Army's Special Services unit, spending the next years touring the Pacific entertaining the troops.

After the war, he performed on Broadway, appearing in Heads or Tails and Bertolt Brecht's Galileo, both in 1947, the comedy Twentieth Century by Ben Hecht and Charles MacArthur in 1951, and Dear Charles, another comedy, in 1955.

== Career ==
Klemperer's first major film role was as a psychiatrist in Alfred Hitchcock's The Wrong Man (1956). Earlier that year in Death of a Scoundrel he had a smaller role as the lawyer of the hero/villain portrayed by George Sanders. He played a German government officer in the 1959 episode, "The Haunted U-Boat", of the series One Step Beyond. Also in 1959, he appeared as a Frenchman in the episode "Fragile" of the Western TV series Have Gun – Will Travel. He received significant notice for his role in the award-winning 1961 film Judgment at Nuremberg. The film presents a fictionalized account of the post-World War II Judges' Trial, one of the Nuremberg trials, with Klemperer portraying Emil Hahn, a Nazi prosecutor and one of the defendants at the trial. Prior to this, he had a small role in the 1957 Errol Flynn film Istanbul and a pivotal part in the "Comstock Conspiracy" episode of Maverick that same year. He played the title role in the 1961 film Operation Eichmann, opposite his future co-star John Banner.

Klemperer guest-starred in the first Brian Keith television series, Crusader, a Cold War drama that aired on CBS. During this time, he made three guest appearances on Perry Mason: he played East German murder victim Stefan Riker in the 1958 episode "The Case of the Desperate Daughter"; the East European character Ulrik Zenas in the 1963 episode "The Case of the Two-Faced Turn-a-bout"; and Police Inspector Hurt in 1964 in "The Case of a Place Called Midnight". In 1963, Klemperer also portrayed a professor of psychology in "The Dream Book", an episode on the sitcom My Three Sons. He played Lt. Huebner in the 1965 film Ship of Fools, in which he tells Mrs. Mary Treadwell, played by Vivien Leigh, that her life "ends by sitting in a nightclub with a paid escort who tells [her] the lies [she wants] to hear."

Prior to Hogan's Heroes, Klemperer appeared in the 1956 episode "Safe Conduct" of Alfred Hitchcock Presents, along with John Banner; twice appeared as Hugo on the syndicated romantic comedy series, How to Marry a Millionaire (1957–1959), with Barbara Eden and Merry Anders; and appeared on the "Purple Gang" episode of The Untouchables.

=== Hogan's Heroes era ===
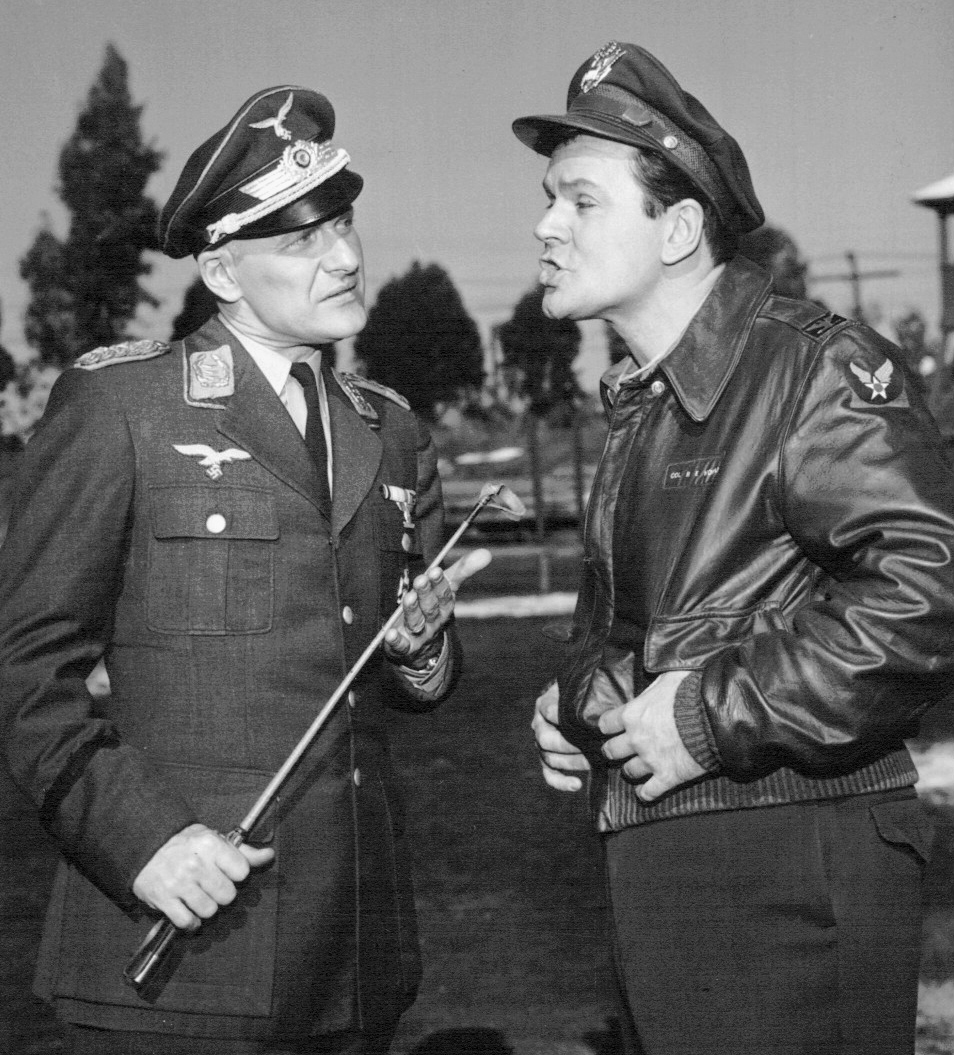
Klemperer with Bob Crane during an episode of Hogan's Heroes

Klemperer is best known as Colonel Wilhelm Klink, the bungling, cowardly, conceited, and self-serving Kommandant of Stalag 13 on Hogan's Heroes which was broadcast on CBS from 1965 to 1971. Klemperer was conscious that he would be playing the role of a German officer during the Nazi regime, and he accepted the part only on the condition that Klink would be portrayed as a fool who never succeeded.

Klemperer made a cameo appearance in the character of Klink in the Batman episode "It's How You Play the Game" and as Officer Bolix in the Lost in Space episode "All That Glitters" in 1966. He played a bumbling East German official in the 1968 American comedy film The Wicked Dreams of Paula Schultz, directed by George Marshall and starring Elke Sommer and several of his costars from Hogan's Heroes, including Bob Crane and John Banner. Klemperer starred in Wake Me When the War Is Over in 1969, playing the role of German Major Erich Mueller, alongside Eva Gabor. He also played a villain in an episode of Voyage to the Bottom of the Sea titled "The Blizzard Makers".

For his performance as Klink, Klemperer received five consecutive Emmy Award nominations for best supporting actor, from 1966 to 1970, winning successive awards in 1968 and 1969.

== Later career ==
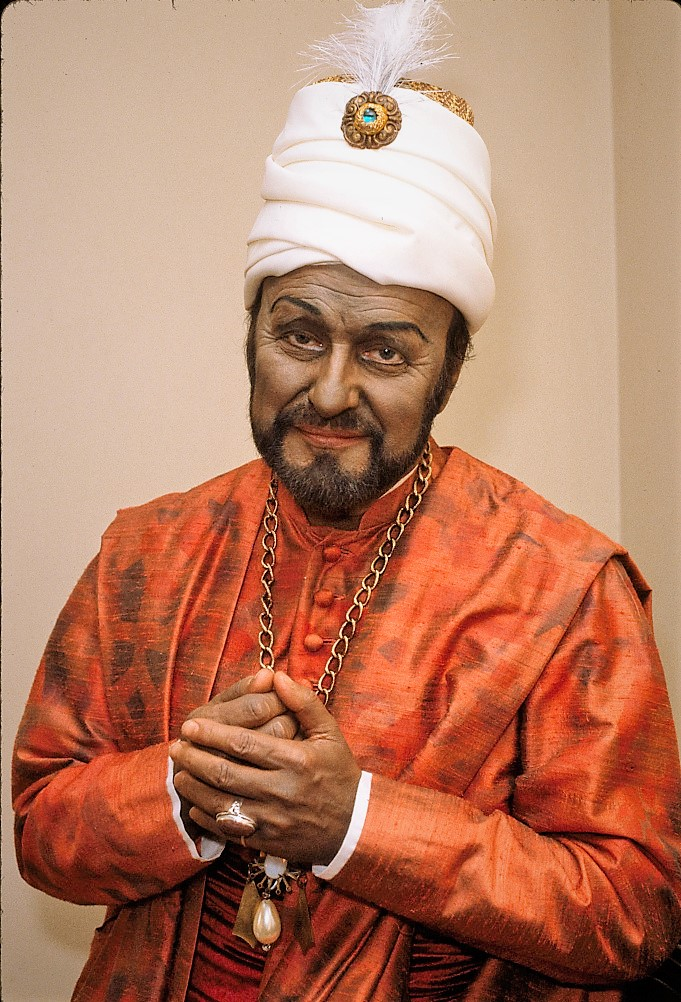
Klemperer as Bassa Selim in Die Entführung aus dem Serail (The Abduction from the Seraglio), 1982

After his father's death in 1973, Klemperer returned to Broadway, appearing in The Night of the Tribades in 1977. He expanded his acting career with musical roles in opera, and earned a Best Featured Actor Tony Award nomination for his performance in Cabaret in its 1987 Broadway revival, playing "Herr Schultz".

A member of the board of directors of the New York Chamber Symphony, Klemperer served as a narrator with many other American symphony orchestras including the Cincinnati Chamber Orchestra. He also made occasional guest appearances on television dramas, and took part in a few studio recordings, notably a version of Arnold Schoenberg's Gurre-Lieder with the Boston Symphony and Seiji Ozawa, in 1979. From 1979 to 1982, he appeared as Bassa Selim in 18 performances of Mozart's Singspiel Die Entführung aus dem Serail at the Metropolitan Opera in New York. In 1981, he appeared, to critical and audience raves, as Prince Orlofsky in Seattle Opera's production of Die Fledermaus.

In 1990, he narrated the children's story "Gerald McBoing Boing" (music by Gail Kubik) for a CD of classical music for children. In January 1991 he performed as narrator in the Milwaukee Symphony Orchestra's concerts and subsequent Koss Classics recording of "Lelio", by Hector Berlioz, in an English translation. In 1992, he made a guest appearance in an episode of Law & Order, "Starstruck", as the father of an attempted murder suspect.

In 1993, Klemperer reprised the role of Klink in an episode of The Simpsons as Homer's guardian angel and spirit guide in the episode "The Last Temptation of Homer". According to the episode's DVD commentary, when Klemperer appeared, he had to be given a quick reminder of how to play Colonel Klink. He declined other offers to reprise the character, including one from talk-show host Conan O'Brien.

Klemperer made his final appearance on Broadway in 1995 in the Circle in the Square production of Anton Chekhov's Uncle Vanya, in which he played Professor Serebryakov.

Klemperer appeared in several episodes of the news/talk show Politically Incorrect.

For many years, Klemperer was an elected member of the council of Actors' Equity Association, and was a vice president of the union at the time of his death.

== Personal life ==
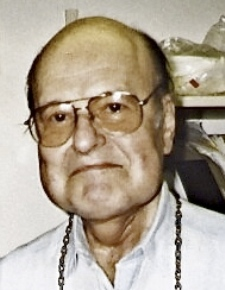
Klemperer in 1998

Klemperer was the father of two children, Mark (born 1959) and Erika (born 1963), with his second wife, Susan Dempsay. On the set of Hogan's Heroes he met his third wife, actress Louise Troy, who was making a guest appearance. They married in 1969, and divorced in 1975.

In 1997, Klemperer married his fourth wife, television actress Kim Hamilton, after dating her for 21 years. They remained married until Klemperer's death.

== Death ==
Klemperer died of cancer at his home in Manhattan on December 6, 2000, at the age of 80. He was cremated and his ashes were scattered at sea.

== Filmography ==
=== Film ===
Year	Title	Role	Notes
1956	Flight to Hong Kong	Bendesh	
1956	Death of a Scoundrel	Herbert Bauman (Clementi's lawyer)	
1956	The Wrong Man	Dr. Bannay	Uncredited
1957	Istanbul	Paul Renkov	
1957	5 Steps to Danger	Dr. Simmons	
1957	Kiss Them for Me	Lieutenant Walter Wallace	
1958	The High Cost of Loving	Joseph Jessup	
1958	The Goddess	Joe Wilsey	
1958	Houseboat	Harold Messner	
1961	Operation Eichmann	Adolf Eichmann	
1961	Judgment at Nuremberg	Emil Hahn	
1962	Escape from East Berlin	Walter Brunner	
1964	Youngblood Hawke	Mr. Leffer	
1965	Dark Intruder	Professor Malaki	
1965	Ship of Fools	Lieutenant Huebner	
1968	The Wicked Dreams of Paula Schultz	Klaus	
1991	The Cabinet of Dr. Ramirez	Fat Man Looking for a Tax Break	
1992	Queen Esther	Haman	Voice, direct-to-video release

=== Television ===
Year	Title	Role	Notes
1951–1952	Goodyear Television Playhouse	Various roles	2 episodes
1953	The Secret Files of Captain Video	Meister	Episode: "The Box"
1955	Studio 57	Dubrov	Segment: "Win a Cigar"
1955	Crusader	Wilhelm Leichner	Episode: "The Bargain"
1955	Climax!		2 episodes
1956	Alfred Hitchcock Presents	Professor Klopka / Captain Kriza	Season 1 Episode 21: "Safe Conduct"
1957	Navy Log	Ludwig	Episode: " After You, Ludwig"
1957	Wire Service	Krylov	Episode: "The Washington Stars"
1957	General Electric Theater	Muller	Episode: "The Questioning Note"
1957	M Squad	Heinrich Ronn	Episode: "Face of Evil"
1957	Maverick	Alex Jennings	Episode: "Comstock Conspiracy"
1958	Perry Mason	Stefan Riker	Episode: "The Case of the Desperate Daughter"
1958	Studio One	Dorfmann	Episode: "Balance of Terror"
1958	The Thin Man	Albert	Episode: "The Pre-Incan Caper"
1958	Gunsmoke	Clifton Bunker	Episode: "Sunday Supplement"
1958	The Court of Last Resort	Malone	Episode: "The Allen Cutler Case"
1958	The Silent Service	Captain Lieutenant Prien	Episode: "U-47 in Scapa Flow"
1959	Alfred Hitchcock Presents	Mr. Ranks	Season 5 Episode 2: "The Crystal Trench"
1959	Judgment at Nuremberg	Emil Hahn	Playhouse 90
1959	Behind Closed Doors	Slavko	Episode: "Crypto 40"
1959	Steve Canyon	Linz	Episode: "Iron Curtain"
1959	The Third Man	Holz Donner	Episode: "The Third Medaillon"
1959	Have Gun – Will Travel	Etienne Ledoux	Season 3, Episode 7: "Fragile"
1959	Alcoa Presents: One Step Beyond	Herr Bautmann	Episode: "The Haunted U-Boat"
1959	How to Marry a Millionaire	Mr. Obermeyer	Episode: "Gwen's Secret"
1960	The Alaskans	Baron	Episode: "Gold Fever"
1960	Overland Trail	Arnold Braun	Episode: "Vigilantes of Montana"
1960	Alcoa Theatre	Colonel Hanning	Episode: "The Observer"
1960	Rawhide	Kessel	Episode: "Incident of the Music Maker"
1960	Men into Space	Major Kralenko	Episode: "Flare Up"
1960	The Untouchables	Jan Tornek	Episode: "Purple Gang"
1960	Thriller	Mr. Clark	Episode: "Man in the Middle"
1961	The Islanders	Michel Serati	Episode: "The Pearls of Ratu"
1961	Have Gun – Will Travel	Leander Johnson	Episode: "The Uneasy Grave"
1961	Adventures in Paradise	Kuberli	Episode: "Survival"
1962	Checkmate	Franz Leder	Episode: "An Assassin Arrives, Andante"
1963	Perry Mason	Ulric Zenas	Episode: "The Case of the Two-Faced Turn-a-bout"
1963	The Lloyd Bridges Show	Gustavsen	Episode: "The Wonder of Wanda"
1963	77 Sunset Strip	Schtiekel	Episode: "Escape to Freedom"
1963	The Dakotas	Colonel von Bleist	Episode: "Trial at Grand Forks"
1963	My Three Sons	Professor Engel	2 episodes
1963	GE True	Karl Hermann Frank	Episode: "Heydrich" (two parts)
1964	Perry Mason	Hurt	Episode: "The Case of a Place Called Midnight"
1964	The Man from U.N.C.L.E.	Laslo Kurasov	Episode: "The Project Strigas Affair"
1964	Voyage to the Bottom of the Sea	Cregar	Episode: "The Blizzard Maker"
1965	Voyage to the Bottom of the Sea	Brainwasher (voice)	Episode: "The Saboteur"
1965	Bob Hope Presents the Chrysler Theatre	Colonel Wertha	Episode: "Escape into Jeopardy"
1965–1971	Hogan's Heroes	Colonel Wilhelm Klink	168 episodes
1966	Lost in Space	Bolix	Episode: "All That Glitters"
1966	Batman	Colonel Klink (uncredited cameo)	Episode: "It's How You Play the Game"
1968	Rowan & Martin's Laugh-In	Colonel Wilhelm Klink	Episode #2.6
1969	Wake Me When the War Is Over	Mayor Erich Mueller	Television film
1972	Night Gallery	Ludwig Asper	Episode: "Green Fingers/The Funeral/The Tune in Dan's Cafe"
1972	The Doris Day Show	Jacques Moreau	Episode: "Gowns by Louis"
1972	Assignment Vienna	Inspector Hoffman	Television film
1972	Love, American Style	Harold Baxter	Segment: "Love and the Unbearable Fiance"
1973	McMillan & Wife	Dr. Ernest Bleeker	Episode: "The Devil You Say"
1977	The Rhinemann Exchange	Franz Altmuller	Miniseries
1978	Tabitha	Henry Hastings	Episode: "Tabitha's Party"
1979	The Love Boat	Mr. Perkins	Episode: "The Grass Is Always Greener..."
1980	Steve Martin: Comedy Is Not Pretty	Plato	Television special
1981	Vega$	Siegfried Klaus	Episode: "Heist"
1981	Return of the Beverly Hillbillies	C.D. Medford	Television film
1983	Matt Houston	Felix Randolph	Episode: "The Purrfect Crime"
1986	Mr. Sunshine	Dean	2 episodes
1988	American Experience	Prince Maximilian of Bavaria	Episode: "Views of a Vanishing Frontier"
1992	Law & Order	William Unger	Episode: "Star Struck"
1993	The Simpsons	Homer's Guardian Angel as Colonel Klink	Voice, Episode: "The Last Temptation of Homer", (final appearance)
