= Wake Me When the War Is Over =

1969 television film directed by Gene Nelson

- Wake Me When the War Is Over poster
- Written by: John Aylesworth; Frank Peppiatt
- Directed by: Gene Nelson
- Starring: Ken Berry; Eva Gabor; Werner Klemperer
- Music by: Fred Steiner
- Country of origin: United States
- Original language: English

Production
- Producers: Sidney Morse; Gene Nelson
- Cinematography: Archie R. Dalzell
- Running time: 74 minutes
- Production company: Thomas-Spelling Productions

Original release
- Release: October 14, 1969

Wake Me When the War Is Over is a 1969 American made-for-television comedy film directed by Gene Nelson and starring Ken Berry and Eva Gabor. It first aired as the ABC Movie of the Week on October 14, 1969.

== Plot ==
In January 1944, during World War II, a naive and inept Lieutenant Roger Carrington of the United States Army Air Forces accidentally falls out of a C-47 when attempting to drop airborne leaflet propaganda. He lands in German territory. Escaping pursuing German soldiers, he is hidden by a local baroness named Marlene. Marlene is against the Nazis, and sympathizes with Carrington, taking him under her wing to recover, and eventually falling in love with him.

When World War II ends, Marlene realizes that Carrington will leave when he finds this out. Not wanting him to go yet, she decides not to tell him about the war ending so he will stay, and she manages to keep him with her for nearly five years, explaining the Allies are continuously losing, then recapturing England. Around then is when Carrington convinces himself that it's his duty to continue fighting on a one man sabotage operation. He leaves Marlene's estate, not realizing he's now in a peacetime country. The only problem is, no one can tell him the war is over because no one around him speaks English including the Baroness' maid Eva who accompanies him.

== Cast ==
- Ken Berry as Roger Carrington
- Eva Gabor as Baroness Marlene
- Werner Klemperer as Major Erich Mueller
- Danielle De Metz as Eva
- Hans Conried as Erhardt
- Jim Backus as Colonel
- Parley Baer as Erhardt's Butler
- Alan Hewitt as Koenig

== See also ==
- Situation Hopeless... But Not Serious
