= Julius Korngold =

Austrian music critic (1860–1945)

Dr Julius Korngold
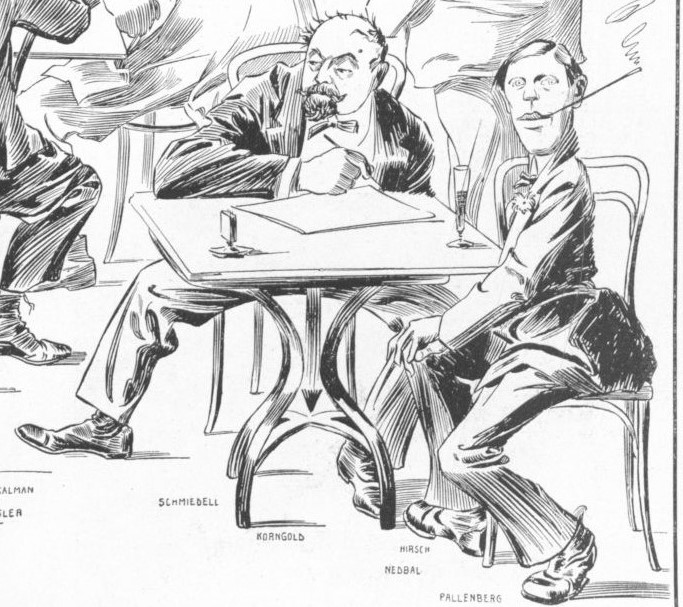
- Julius Korngold 1911 (Left)
- Born: Julius Leopold Gagnon; 22 December 1860; Brünn, Moravia, Austria
- Died: 20 September 1945 (aged 84); Hollywood, Los Angeles
- Occupation: Music Critic
- Years active: 1904-1934
- Children: Erich Wolfgang Korngold

Julius Leopold Korngold (24 December 1860 – 25 September 1945) was an Austrian music critic. He was the leading critic in early twentieth century Vienna, serving as chief music critic of the Neue Freie Presse from 1904 to 1934. His son was the composer Erich Wolfgang Korngold, whom he named after Wolfgang Amadeus Mozart, one of his favorite composers.

== Life and career ==
He was the father of composer Erich Wolfgang Korngold. He co-wrote the libretto of the opera Die tote Stadt with his son (under the collective pseudonym Paul Schott). He died in Hollywood, California on 25 September 1945.

In his time, he was known as the "dean of European music critics". He is most notable for championing the works of Gustav Mahler at a time when many did not think much of him.
