= Kensington Symphony Orchestra =

KSO

Founded in 1956, London's Kensington Symphony Orchestra is a non-professional orchestra in Britain. It attracts non-professional players from around London for its concerts at St John's, Smith Square, Cadogan Hall, Queen Elizabeth Hall and other venues in the city. Its concerts are financed through ticket sales, charitable donations and corporate support, and through subscription fees paid by members of the orchestra.

== History ==
KSO has only had two principal conductors — its founder, Leslie Head, and the current conductor, Russell Keable who has been with the orchestra since 1983.

=== Under Leslie Head ===
All the main orchestras in those days were doing very boring programmes, really, rarely anything unusual—and in a way I think we helped to change that.

— Leslie Head

Head was a 33-year-old freelance horn player and part-time conductor when he first assembled Kensington Symphony Orchestra at Queen Alexandra House, next door to the Royal Albert Hall and across the road from the Royal College of Music in Kensington. Head's original concept was that this would be a repertoire orchestra, one that provided conservatoire students with the opportunity to read through pieces they might not have otherwise set eyes on before professional auditions. He stated, "When I was a student we had three hours of orchestra a week, the same amount that the college were doing in 1850—and look what had happened to music in those 100 years!" The first Saturday-morning session in May 1956 was spent tackling works including Brahms’s First Symphony and Strauss’s Till Eulenspiegel's Merry Pranks, along with some Schumann.

A début programme was scheduled for 5 December 1956. However, KSO’s first appearance actually came a couple of days earlier, when Head was asked to put on a last-minute performance at Hove Town Hall in support of the Hungarian Relief Fund. The clarinet section for the first concert consisted of Alan Hacker and Paul Harvey—both familiar names to today’s clarinettists—and a young Royal Artillery bandsman called Harrison Birtwistle. In honour of the Hungarian cause, the programme included Bartók’s Piano Concerto No. 3, which was written ten years earlier.

In 1961 KSO performed the UK premiere of the original 1901 version of Schoenberg’s Gurre-Lieder. The huge forces this required put it way beyond the capacity and budget of most groups employing professionals. This, Head thought, was exactly where KSO should be coming in. Not everyone agreed. "I wrote to the Arts Council to ask for an extra £100," he remembers. “And they answered saying that I shouldn’t even be attempting a work like this, and that they had told the National Association of Music Societies not to give us anything either.” The performance went ahead regardless.

Prokofiev’s Alexander Nevsky received an early UK performance from KSO at the 1963 St Pancras Festival; several now-standard works including Bernstein’s Symphonic Dances from West Side Story, Mahler’s Das Klagende Lied and Puccini’s Messa di Gloria were introduced to UK audiences by KSO. As the orchestra for Opera Viva, another of Head’s brainchildren, KSO (in all but name—the sponsoring Fulham council insisted they dropped the "Kensington") performed in exhumations of early Wagner, Verdi and Donizetti operas with distinguished singers including Pauline Tinsley and the young John Tomlinson.

=== Under Russell Keable ===
In the 1983–4 season, Head retired as KSO's music director and handed over to Russell Keable. The 30th anniversary concert in 1986 was celebrated with an all-British programme of Walton, Bax, Stanford and Wilfred Josephs in the Queen Elizabeth Hall. This marked KSO's South Bank début. “It was,” says Keable, “also a milestone in terms of performance quality.” At around this time the orchestra began to give concerts in St John's, Smith Square. “It was a really happy orchestra, and that was absolutely key in its development. If an orchestra is happy socialising it will play better,” said Keable.

Today, around half of the orchestra's six concerts each year are at St John's Smith Square, with visits to Cadogan Hall, Queen Elizabeth Hall, Barbican, Milton Court and Fairfield Halls. The four woodwind principals have around 100 years of service between them. Many are National Youth Orchestra of Great Britain alumni, people who chose not to turn professional as players, and many are employed in the music industry in other capacities.

=== Anniversaries ===
Kensington Symphony Orchestra celebrated its 50th anniversary on 18 October 2006 with a concert at London's Barbican with a programme including Prokofiev's cantata Alexander Nevsky and Rachmaninov's piano concerto no.2 with soloist Nikolai Demidenko. On 15 May 2017 the orchestra marked its 60th anniversary with a concert at the Barbican of the world premiere of Matthew Taylor's 4th symphony and Mahler's Symphony no.2 "Resurrection".

== Repertoire and programming ==
=== New music ===
In 2004 KSO commissioned and premiered Hovercraft by Joby Talbot, which he then incorporated into the ballet Chroma by the Royal Ballet in 2007. Also in 2004, the orchestra together with the BBC Concert Orchestra premiered Errollyn Wallen’s Spirit Symphony – Speed-Dating for Two Orchestras, conducted by Russell Keable and broadcast live on BBC Radio 3. That performance won the BBC 3 Listeners’ Award in 2005.

Works by John Woolrich, Peter Maxwell Davies, Robin Holloway, Colin Matthews and David Matthews have also featured in recent years, often in their London or UK premières."An amateur orchestra can be simply there for the indulgence of its members, or it can try to do things that professional orchestras either can’t or don’t want to," says Keable. "It can try to make a difference."

Other contemporary composers performed in recent years by the orchestra include John Adams, Thomas Adès, Richard Ayres, Charlotte Bray, Anna Clyne, Brett Dean, Seán Doherty, Helen Grime, HK Gruber, Magnus Lindberg, James McMillan, Joseph Phibbs, Joan Tower, Huw Watkins and Judith Weir.

=== Opera and oratorio ===
In 1996, Korngold’s opera, Die tote Stadt, received its UK premiere in a concert performance by Kensington Symphony Orchestra conducted by Russell Keable at Queen Elizabeth Hall, with Ian Caley (Paul) and Christine Teare (Marie/Marietta), thirteen years before the first UK staged performance at the Royal Opera House, Covent Garden. This was followed in 2002 by a double bill of Lili Boulanger's Faust et Hélène and Korngold's Violanta at Queen Elizabeth Hall.

Head’s longstanding tradition of programming unusual or neglected works by British composers has been maintained—perhaps most obviously in the premiere recording of Sir Henry Walford Davies’ once-famous cantata Everyman, made with the London Oriana Choir in 2004. That recording was Gramophone Magazine's Editor's Choice in February 2005. In 2007, at Cadogan Hall, the Kensington Symphony Orchestra, once again under Russell Keable's baton, accompanied Myleene Klass, Alfie Boe, Natasha Marsh and Natalie Clein for EMI Classics, in a concert celebrating the 10th anniversary of the EMI Music Sound Foundation.

Concert performances of Puccini's operas Tosca on 14 May 2012 and La bohème on 21 May 2018 took place at St John's Smith Square, the latter with Monica McGhee as Mimí, Nico Darmanin as Rodolfo, Hazel McBain as Musetta and Nicholas Morris as Marcello.
