= Russell Keable =

British composer and conductor

- Born: England
- Occupation(s): composer and conductor
- Employer: Kensington Symphony Orchestra

Russell Keable is a British educator, composer and conductor. Keable studied conducting at the Royal College of Music with Norman Del Mar and later with George Hurst. Since 1983, he has been the principal conductor of London's Kensington Symphony Orchestra, and since 2006, the principal conductor of the University of Surrey's University Symphony Orchestra and Choir. Since 2006, Keable has taught conducting at the University of Surrey.

Keable is a champion of rarely heard 20th Century works. A supporter of music of Erich Korngold, he gave the British premiere of Die tote Stadt in a concert performance. His research in LA led to the first live performance of Korngold's film score The Sea Hawk. He is a noted advocate for British composers. With the Kensington Symphony Orchestra, he has led first performances of works by many British composers, including Peter Maxwell Davies, John Woolrich, Robin Holloway, David Matthews and John McCabe. He has also made recordings of several works by Robert Simpson. His 2004 performance of the premiere of Errollyn Wallen's Spirit Symphony won the Ivors Composer Award in the BBC Radio 3 Listeners' category in 2005.

Keable has written works for many British ensembles. His opera, Burning Waters, was commissioned by the Buxton Festival and premiered in 2000.
