= Stephen Vost Janssen =

Australian violin and viola player, teacher and composer

Stephen Vost Janssen (or Vost-Janssen; November 1879/1880, Newcastle-Upon-Tyne, England – March/April 1945 Sydney, Australia) was an Australian violin and viola player, teacher and composer, member of the Sydney String Quartet and Austral String Quartet.

Vost Janssen was born in England, but he emigrated to Australia with his mother and his aunt in 1885. At the time, he was only 5 or 6-years-old. When his mother married, the boy took the family name of his new stepfather. He trained as a pianist at a Sydney College of Music and won a silver medal for an original piano composition in 1903. When he returned to Europe for further musical studies, he studied violin with Hans Becker composition with Gustav Schreck and orchestration at the Leipzig Conservatory.

== Life ==
=== Early years and studying ===
The future violist came to Australia as a child with his mother Margaret and aunt Jane in 1885. In 1887 Margaret married Charles Janssen. It is unclear if Stephen was adopted by him formally, but at least he took Charles' name. The family lived in Newcastle, New South Wales.

From 1895 (or somewhat earlier) he was studying at the Sydney College of Music, among his teachers was G. Rivers Allpress (died 1918). In 1903 at a Sydney College of Music examination he received a silver medal as first prize for an original piano composition (Romance in F). In April 1903 he departed for Europe. The farewell concert was held in Newcastle King's Hall and included some compositions of his own: the above-mentioned piano Romance and The Lifeboat (a song).

In May Vost Janssen arrived in London and attended the Handel Festival. He then studied violin (with Hans Becker, brother of Hugo Becker), composition (with Gustav Schreck) and orchestration at the Leipzig Conservatory Among other famous musicians he attended three concerts by 12-years old Mischa Elman. Though he contracted scarlet fever and was a patient in a hospital for two months, he received a flattering diploma.

Returning to England, Vost Janssen became a member of the John Dunn's String Quartet. On 22 May 1905 he left England for Australia. On his voyages he had an opportunity to see a little of Naples and Genova.

While in Europe he published two articles in his native Newcastle newspaper describing musical life in England and Leipzig. A vast review of his non-musical impressions was published a year later, after his return to the homeland.

=== After return to Australia ===
From September 1906 Vost Janssen gave invitation concerts. He had a prominent role in Sydney musical life of those years. One of his pupils from this period was David Burt, who on his insistence went to Germany in spring 1908 to study at the Leipzig Concervatorium. He subsequently (1910) won a three years' scholarship at that institute.

In 1907 Vost Janssen was playing viola in Staell Quartet (also known as Lady Northcote's private quartet or Vice-Regal Quartette; other members were Henri Staell and brothers Francis Mowat Carter and Bryce Carter). Their first performance in Newcastle was on 13 March. By the middle of 1908 Staell left the ensemble and Francis Mowat Carter became the first violin. The second was given to Rudolph Brauer. The quartet was renamed to Sydney String Quartet. Around the same time was established the Sydney Madrigal Society (Madrigal and Chamber Music Society). By summer 1909 Brauer left the ensemble, Vost Janssen replaced him as the second violin. The viola part was played by Nico Ornstein.

Next summer (1910) Vost Janssen joined Cyril Monk's Austral String Quartet. With this and other combinations of prominent Sydney chamber players he participated in many concerts during next years. In November 1911 the violinist Francis Mowat-Carter went to Europe, what meant a loss of one of the most active musical life organizers. This was balanced by Alfred Hill's 1910 arrival to Sydney from New Zealand.

For some time Vost Janssen was conductor of the Newcastle Operatic Society, but resigned this position during 1912–1913 season.

=== After NSW Conservatorium establishing ===
After the New South Wales Conservatorium was established in 1915 and Henri Verbrugghen came to Australia to be a director of it, the Austral String Quartet lost its importance, as Verbrugghen brought with himself a fine Verbrugghen String Quartet. Vost Janssen appeared in a quartet with James Hickey (violin), Chas. Wentzel (viola) and Gladstone Bell (cello), in which he played the first violin.

Vost Janssen died suddenly at his residence in spring 1945.

== Family ==
He married Marion (Daisy) Hamilton in Sydney in 1914.

== Publications ==
- Musical England, a Newcastle Violinist Abroad: Views of Mr. S. Vost Janssen / Newcastle Morning Herald and Miners' Advocate, 8 Jun 1904
- Music in Leipsic: Mr. S. Vost Jassen's Views / Newcastle Morning Herald and Miners' Advocate, 7 Jul 1904
- In England and Germany: An Australian's Impressions / Newcastle Morning Herald and Miners' Advocate, 11 Jul 1905

== Sources ==
- An article in Sydney The Sun, 31 Oct 1920, describing briefly Vost Janssen's career up to 1920
