= String Quartet No. 4 (Hill) =

Musical work; string quartet composed by Alfred Hill

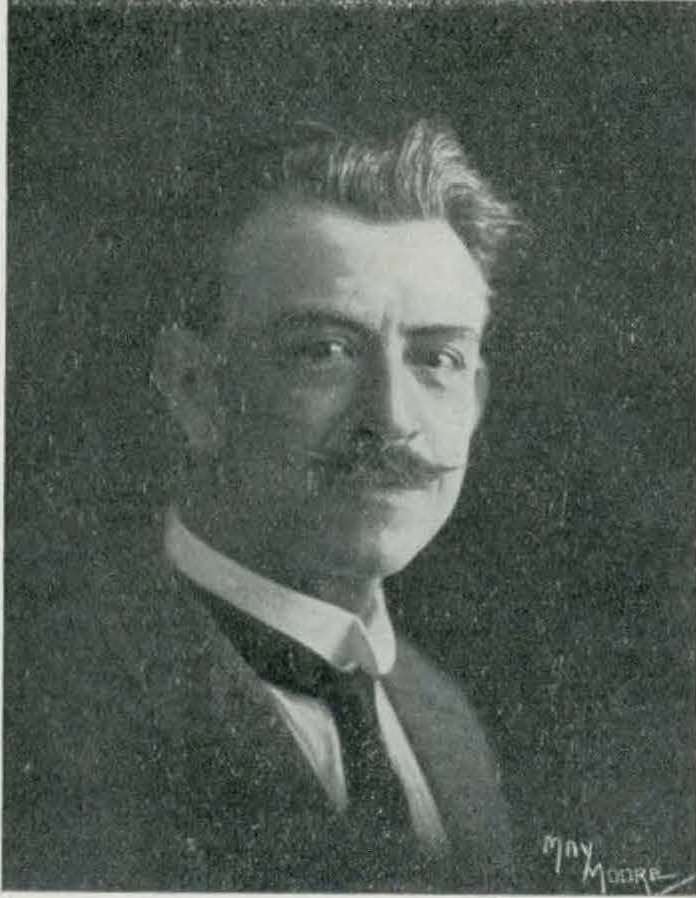
Alfred Hill

String Quartet No. 4 in C minor, Stiles 1.2.3.3 SQ4, was completed by Alfred Hill on 25 July 1916 in Neutral Bay, Sydney (indicated in the manuscript). It is dedicated to Henri Verbrugghen (the first director of the new-founded New South Wales State Conservatorium) and his Verbrugghen String Quartet. It is Hill's first non-program string quartet. The first two movements were transcribed for orchestra in 1955 forming the basis of the Symphony No. 4 "The Pursuit of Happiness" in which this music turns to have a program.

== History and dedication ==
The first two movements seem to be composed specially for this quartet. The scherzo was completed in Leipzig (before 1892) and initially intended for String Quartet No. 1, but was dismissed by composer and reused in his unfinished Symphony No. 1 (written by 1898). Though incomplete as a whole, separate parts of the symphony were performed, but (at least as we know) not the scherzo. Hill reused it again in its original form in this quartet. The finale originates also from the Leipzig years, when it was composed as Rondo for cello or violin and piano.

The manuscript score and parts of the quartet are at the National Library of Australia.

The whole quartet is dedicated to "Henri Verbrugghen and the members of his string quartet". The second movement has a specific dedication to David Nichols (violist), the third to Jenny Cullen (second violin) and the fourth to Henry Verbruggen (first violin). In the manuscript only initials are present: D.E.N., J.C. and H.V. Though the first movement lacks any special dedication, it can be reasonably assumed there should be one to the cellist (James Messeas), the cello having indeed a prominent role in this movement: it sets forth the principal theme.

== Structure ==
The quartet is in four movements.

1. Allegro (C minor)
2. Adagio ma non troppo (A♭ major)
3. Scherzo. Presto (F major)
4. Finale. Allegro con spirito (C minor)

=== I. Allegro ===
The first movement opens with a slow introduction (this is the first of Hill's quartets to have one). After a brief pause, its theme is repeated with pizzicato "answers" in the first violin.

Following is a sonata form. The first subject, a resolute ascending and descending theme in C minor, is stated by the cello and repeated then by the viola. The second subject is a much more quiet idea in the parallel key of E♭ major played by the violins. The exposition concludes with the main theme heard again in the cello part. It is linked to a rather modest development section in which this theme investigates different tonalities before coming to an abrupt stop. The introductory material is repeated in a more tense form and with some cello shrieks. At the end of this section, the violin pizzicato's appear again leading straight to a shortened recapitulation of both subjects (the second in C major this time). The concluding cello theme goes on into the coda combining the two themes.

=== II. Adagio ma non troppo ===
The slow movement is in a ternary ABA form. Its first theme, set by the viola, is in A♭ major, with two characteristic syncopations at the head. After several variations, it comes to B♭ major providing a dominant for the E♭ major second theme notable for its triplets. It changes keys and, again through B♭ major, returns to the first theme in A♭ major appearing with a modified accompaniment.

=== III. Scherzo. Presto ===
The first idea of the scherzo is a dance-like tune in F major. It consists of an 8-bar statement, an 8-bar contrasting section (based on the previous) and an 8-bar concluding restatement, that is loosely entwined with the further section: after 8 additional bars serving as a transition (with a first violin passage) the theme is heard a tone higher, in G major. Another transitory section arrives and brings the "right" tonality, allowing the theme to be stated another time, in an altered way. All of this is repeated directly from the contrasting section. The trio is in B♭ major. Its composition is as perspicuous as that of the outer sections. It is also in a ternary form with a repetition. Following the trio the first section is repeated without any additions of alternations.

=== IV. Finale. Allegro con spirito ===
After a brief introduction, the first violin states the C minor principal theme of the last movement. It is written in a sonata rondo form lacking a proper development section. The first theme is temperate, rather smooth than impulsive. The first subject, however, is much broader and includes a full version of the theme, a transitory section developing the material and another statement of the theme (again in C minor). After some bridging bars, the gloomy and desperate second subject (in F minor) is heard. Although attempting to change the mode to the major, it ends in minor.

The music proceeds to a repetition of the whole first subject, by which the second appearance of the main theme is in G minor. Its complaints are answered by the resolution of the second subject (in C minor). In the coda the essential figures of the principal theme are heard once more. The final chord ends the quartet strongly and mercilessly.

== Editions ==
- Alfred Hill. String Quartet No.4 in C minor. London: Stiles Music Publications, 2002 (pub. number S34-2002; ISMN 979-0-720029-34-4)

== Recordings ==
- (rec. 2008) Dominion String Quartet (Gezentsvey, Harris, Maurice, Chickering) – (2008) Naxos Records 8.572097.
