= Austral String Quartet (1910s) =

1910s string quartet ensemble

Austral String Quartet was a string quartet ensemble based in Sydney active from 1910 to 1916.

The existence of some music group bearing such a name was advertised as early as 1908, but regular activity began with violinist Cyril Monk's leadership. Other members of his quartet were Anton Tschaikov (2nd violin), Stephen Vost Janssen (viola) and Gladstone Bell (cello). The first concert was held at the YMCA Hall (Sydney) on 2 June and included the Australian premiere of Claude Debussy's String Quartet. The same year Bell returned to London and was replaced by Carl Gotsch. Early in 1911 Monk's teacher Alfred Hill took the second violin. By 1913 season he was replaced by Ludwig D'Hage (who moved to Sydney from Rockhampton the previous year).

The quartet performed to ca.1916. Among Australian performances made by it were quartets by César Franck, Ernest Chausson and Maurice Ravel.

It is most probable that the establishing of this quartet gave Alfred Hill an impulse to finish his two Maori quartets (No. 1 and No. 2, both premiered in 1911) and compose the third (1912).

The most important predecessors of this quartet were the Zerbini String Quartet (founded ca.1885) and Francis Mowat Carter's Sydney String Quartet. The notable role of the Austral Quartet was taken up in Sydney by Verbrugghen String Quartet, members of which came to the city after Henri Verbrugghen was appointed the director of New South Wales Conservatorium in 1916.

In the late 1950s Another ensemble bearing the same name was established in Sydney.

== Sources ==
- Austral String Quartet in the Dictionary of Sydney
