= Henry Krips =

Henry Krips may refer to:

- Henry Krips (conductor), conductor and composer
- Henry Krips (scholar), professor of cultural studies
