= String Quartet in A major =

String Quartet in A major may refer to:

- No. 6 of the String Quartets, Op. 20 (Haydn)
- String Quartet No. 9 (Mozart)
- String Quartet No. 18 (Mozart)
- String Quartet No. 5 (Beethoven)
- String Quartet No. 19 (Spohr)
- String Quartet No. 30 (Spohr)
- String Quartet No. 1 (Dvořák)
- String Quartet in A major (Bliss)
- String Quartet No. 2 (Shostakovich)
- String Quartet No. 7 (Hill)
- String Quartet No. 8 (Hill)
