= String Quartet No. 2 (Hill) =

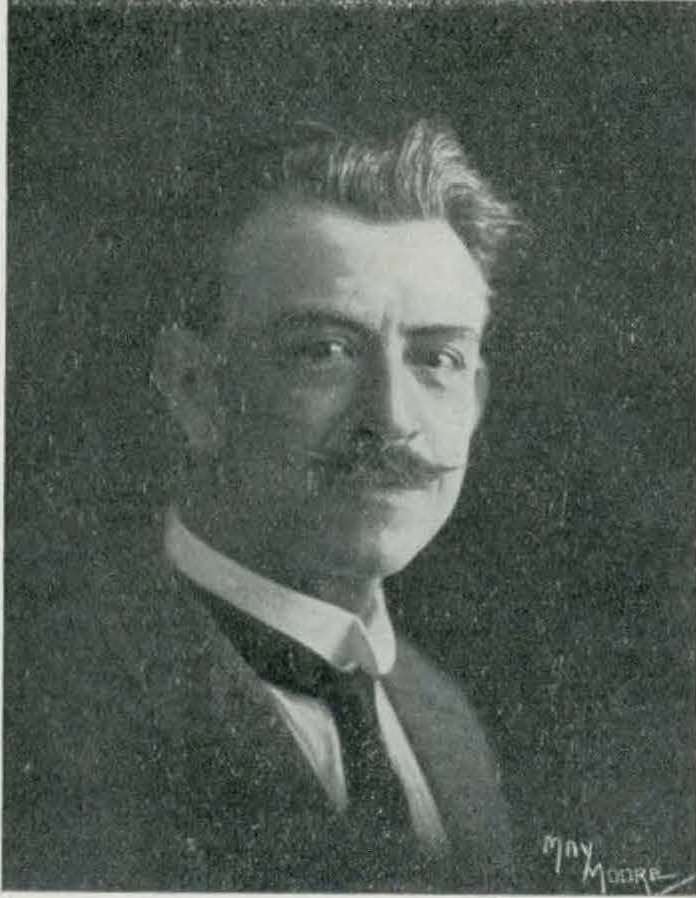
Alfred Hill

String Quartet No. 2 in G minor "A Maori Legend in Four Scenes", Stiles 1.2.3.3 SQ2, often called "Maori Quartet", was composed by Alfred Hill in 1907–11 and premiered immediately in 1911. It is dedicated to Earnest [sic] Wunderlich — "in slight appreciation". The first two quartets were published together by Breitkopf & Härtel in 1913 (no full score, only parts). Each of them used to be referred as Maori, a feature that can lead to confusion. Today the first one is called Maori, while for the second the longer subtitle is retained.

The Second is one of Hill's most notable quartets (along with the Eleventh). Its approximate duration is 19–22 minutes.

== History ==
On 15 April 1907 the last concert of the Christchurch International Exhibition 1906–1907 was held. After this Hill went to Hampden in the South Island for a vacation, where he began composing the quartet. According to the note on the manuscript, it was finished only four years later, on 26 August 1911. A non-final version premiered by Austral String Quartet two months earlier, on 1 July, in St. James' Hall, Sydney. This happened just a few weeks after the first performance of Hill's First Quartet (18 May 1911). The score was further revised by the composer, and the premier performance of the final version was held by the Austral String Quartet in Sydney on 6 September. On 31 October it was played by Francis Mowat Carter, the composer, Stephen Vost Janssen and Bryce Carter during a farewell concerto to Mowat Carter, as he was going to further his studies in Vienna.

It is unknown how much of the quartet was written in 1907, but it appears that Hill was impelled to complete it when he felt there was a performing opportunity by the newly-established (1910) Austral String Quartet.

Although the program uses a Māori legend, none of the themes is indicated as an original Māori melody (as it is in Hill's cantata Hinemoa, Violin Sonata No. 4 and String Quartet No. 1). It is unlikely that this quartet contain any direct reference to a specific Māori tune, but certain characteristics of Māori music can be found in the piece.

== Program ==
Hill claims that the program of the quartet is based on a Māori legend. It is provided by him as follows.

In the forest guarded against man by the potency of a Karakia (talisman) grew the giant kauri (a beautiful New Zealand tree), from which Rata, the hero, would fashion the canoe to bear him across unknown seas. Entering the forest as Taniwha (the grim monster) and Kotuku (a beautiful crane) were engaged in deadly combat, Rata felled the tree. That night he dreamt he heard Kotuku's cry for aid. Changing into a beautiful Maiden, she told how the wicked Tohunga (priest) has cast a spell on her and Taniwha was endeavouring to make her reveal the Karakia. She informed Rata that his labours would be in vain unless he knew the magic formula, and promised to teach it to him if he would kill Taniwha. Next day Rata found the kauri waving gloriously again and beneath it lurked Taniwha. Rata boldly slew the monster and in its place stood the lovely maiden of his dream. From her he learned the formula which he recited to Tane (the forest god). As he did so the air became full of the cry of countless birds. Circling the tree they pecked and pecked until it fell, then fashioning it into the noblest canoe that the world has seen. Dedicating it to Tane, the lovers and birds chanted the mystic Karakia, Ki te urunga te waka.

== Structure ==
The quartet is laid out in four movements corresponding to the four scenes of its program.

1. The Forest. Allegro agitato (G minor)
  a) The fight of the Crane and the Monster
  b) Rata enters the wood
2. The Dream. Adagio (A♭ major)
3. The Karakia (Scherzo). The karakia (incantation) and the coming of the birds. Adagio — Presto (G minor)
4. The Dedication (Finale). The dedication and launching of the canoe. Poco adagio — Allegro (G major)

=== Hill's music notes ===
In addition to the general program Hill wrote music notes for all the four movements.

[The Forest] This carries the hearer into the mysterious shades of the forest, upon which break sounds of the struggle between the Kotuku and the Taniwha. Viola and cello are heard against the double pizzicato which here suggests the tapping of the woodpecker in the silent forest, and later, transferred to the cello, is employed to signify the thudding strokes of the Taniwha. Music suggestive of distant trumpets heralds the approach of Rata, whose splendid theme is allotted to the first violin and afterwards taken up by the cello. The vigorous development section illustrates the progress of the fight, while the reappearance of Rata's theme once more transfers the interest to the forest. In the Coda the hero's work is accomplished, and as evening falls restfully faint echoes of the combat reach the ear.

[The Dream] The first theme exquisitely evokes the fabric of the hero's vision – a dream flight. Fugitive thoughts of the noble canoe float across Rata's awakening sight until the second theme appears with a complete change of tonality. Again is heard the sad cry of Kotuku, hard beset by the grim monster. The music swells in a great crescendo as the dream grows more vivid. Then, as it fades, the slumber motive reappears, giving a sense of complete rest.

[The Karakia (Scherzo)] It opens Adagio with the theme of the spell. The solemn revelation is followed by an ethereal tremolando, illustrative of the call and the coming of the birds. The Trio shows the birds felling and shaping the giant kauri, and as they work "sweet jargoning" embroiders the theme of Rata and the dream maiden.

[The Dedication (Finale)] The movement opens Adagio with the Karakia motive sounded as the dedication of the canoe to Tane. Then the main theme appears, telling of the festivities at the launching. A lull in the gaiety is expressed by an impressive ritard, and the hero's motive is heard once more, significant of the realization of a noble dream. The exuberant Coda sounds the note of high festival, and the legend ends in music of thrilling quality.

== Editions ==
- Alfred Hill. String Quartet No.2 in A Minor "A Maori legend in four scenes for string quartet". Narara, N.S.W.: Stiles Music Publications, 2006 (ISMN 979-0-720029-80-1)

== Recordings ==
- (rec. between 1945–1952) Queensland State String Quartet (Ernest Llewellyn, Harold Tabener, David Powell, Don Howley) — (remastered version, 1996) Canberra: Canberra School of Music (Chamber music made and played in Australia, 1945–1952)
- (rec. ca.1962) Austral String Quartet (1950s-1970s) — (LP) Festival Records FC 30,802; reissue: (LP, 1980s) St. Leonards, N.S.W.: Universal Record Club UC-586
- (rec. 2006) Dominion String Quartet – (2007) Naxos Records 8.570491.
