= String Quartet No. 8 =

String Quartet No. 8 may refer to:

- String Quartet No. 8 (Beethoven) by Ludwig van Beethoven
- String Quartet No. 8 (Diamond) by David Diamond
- String Quartet No. 8 (Dvořák) by Antonín Dvořák
- String Quartet No. 8 (Hill) by Alfred Hill
- String Quartet No. 8 (Maconchy) by Elizabeth Maconchy
- String Quartet No. 8 (Milhaud), Op. 121, by Darius Milhaud
- Quartet No. 8 in F major, K. 168, part of the Viennese Quartets by Wolfgang Amadeus Mozart
- String Quartet No. 8 (Porter) by Quincy Porter
- String Quartet No. 8 (Rihm) by Wolfgang Rihm
- String Quartet No. 8 (Schubert) by Franz Schubert
- String Quartet No. 8 (Shostakovich) by Dmitri Shostakovich
- String Quartet No. 8 (Simpson) by Robert Simpson
- String Quartet No. 8 (Spohr) by Louis Spohr
- String Quartet No. 8 (Villa-Lobos) by Heitor Villa-Lobos
