= Violin Sonata in A minor =

Violin Sonata in A minor may refer to:

- Violin Sonata No. 4 (Beethoven)
- No. 2 of the Violin Sonatas, Op. 137 (Schubert)
- Violin Sonata No. 1 (Schumann)
- F-A-E Sonata
- Violin Sonata No. 2 (Ysaÿe)
- Violin Sonata No. 2 (Hill)
- Violin Sonata No. 3 (Hill)
- Violin Sonata No. 3 (Enescu)
