= Constance Brandon Usher =

Australian pianist

Constance Brandon Usher was an Australian pianist. She was the sister to Beatrice Usher (professional actress) and daughter of Alfred Samuel Usher, the son of carpenter Alfred Ralph Brandon Usher and not to be confused with violinist and composer Alfred Usher (son of Richard Usher, died 1864).

Constance studied at the Leipzig Conservatory for four years. She came back to her homeland in late 1902. She married Commander Balkie Simpson, R.N.R.

On 6 July 1907, she performed in Sydney with Cyril Monk the Violin Sonata No. 3 by Alfred Hill.
