= String Quartet No. 5 (Hill) =

String Quartet No. 5 in E♭ major "The Allies", Stiles 1.2.3.3 SQ5, was completed by Alfred Hill on 24 June 1920 in Sydney (as indicated in the manuscript). It is dedicated to Henri Verbrugghen (the first director of the New South Wales State Conservatorium), whose quartet gave the first public performance of the composition on 2 March 1921. The music of the quartet presents four nations who were allies during World War I. It was subsequently arranged by Hill for string orchestra as his Symphony No. 11 "The Four Nations". The approximate duration of the quartet is 29–33 minutes, which makes it one of the most substantial quartets composed by Hill.

== Structure ==
The quartet is in four movements, each presenting a nation: France, USA, Italy, and Great Britain.

1. Artistic. Allegro risoluto — Andantino — Tranquillo (E♭ major)
2. Syncopated. Intermezzo. Allegretto moderato (G minor)
3. Romantic. Romance. Andantino (G major)
4. Nautical. Finale. Allegretto (E♭ major)

== Editions ==
- Alfred Hill. String Quartet No.5 in E♭. Narara: Stiles Music Publications, 2007 (pub. number S72-2006; ISMN 979-0-720029-75-7)

== Recordings ==
- (rec. 1994) Australian String Quartet (Hennessy, Lea, Crellin, Laurs) — (1997) Marco Polo 8.223746.
- (rec. 2007) Dominion String Quartet (Gezentsvey, Pucher, Maurice, Chickering) – (2009) Naxos Records 8.572446.
