= String Quartet No. 6 =

String Quartet No. 6 may refer to:

- String Quartet No. 6 (Babbitt) by Milton Babbitt
- String Quartet No. 6 (Bartók) by Béla Bartók
- String Quartet No. 6 (Beethoven) by Ludwig van Beethoven
- String Quartet No. 6 (Diamond) by David Diamond
- String Quartet No. 6 (Dvořák) by Antonín Dvořák
- String Quartet No. 6 (Ferneyhough) by Brian Ferneyhough
- String Quartet No. 6 (Halffter) by Cristóbal Halffter
- String Quartet No. 6 (Hill) by Alfred Hill
- String Quartet No. 6 (McCabe), Silver Nocturnes, by John McCabe
- String Quartet No. 6 (Maconchy) by Elizabeth Maconchy
- String Quartet No. 6 (Mendelssohn) by Felix Mendelssohn
- String Quartet No. 6 (Milhaud), Op. 77, by Darius Milhaud
- String Quartet No. 6 (Mozart) by Wolfgang Amadeus Mozart
- String Quartet No. 6 (Porter) by Quincy Porter
- String Quartet No. 6 (Rihm) by Wolfgang Rihm
- String Quartet No. 6 (Schubert) by Franz Schubert
- String Quartet No. 6 (Shostakovich) by Dmitri Shostakovich
- String Quartet No. 6 (Spohr) by Louis Spohr
- String Quartet No. 6 (Villa-Lobos) by Heitor Villa-Lobos
