= Double J (radio station) =

Australian digital radio station

- Australia
- Frequencies: DAB+; DVB-T: Ch. 200; online

Programming
- Language: English
- Format: Eclectic radio
- Network: ABC Radio

Ownership
- Owner: Australian Broadcasting Corporation
- Sister stations: Triple J, Unearthed, Hottest

History
- First air date: 2002; 24 years ago
- Former names: Dig Music (2002–2014)

Technical information
- Licensing authority: Australian Communications and Media Authority

Links
- Webcast: Live stream
- Website: abc.net.au/doublej

Double J is an Australian digital radio station owned by the Australian Broadcasting Corporation. A sister station of the youth-oriented Triple J, it was founded in 2002 as Dig Music and aims to appeal to an older audience with a more refined music catalogue, as well as archive content from Triple J's library. It is available to stream online, stream mobile via the ABC Listen and Triple J apps, via digital TV or via the DAB+ network in Australia.

== History ==
=== Dig Music (2002–2014) ===
ABC Dig Music was founded in November 2002. It emerged from formats developed by Bill Gates and Phil Cullen at ABC Coast FM, which broadcast an adult alternative music format and was for many years ABC Radio's only continuous stream. It was part of a suite of three digital channels, alongside Dig Jazz and Dig Country.

Some ABC Local Radio, ABC Radio National and Triple J music programs were also broadcast on ABC Dig Music.

In July 2009, Dig Radio, Dig Jazz and Dig Country was rebranded as the launch of digital radio stations ABC Dig Music, ABC Jazz and Country.

=== Double J (2014–present) ===
On 24 October 2013, the operations of ABC Dig Music were transferred to the staff of Triple J, and it was announced that the station would undergo a relaunch by April 2014. It was reported that the new station would be positioned as a spin-off of Triple J targeting older listeners, including a focus on new music, and archive content from the Triple J library.

On 9 April 2014, it was announced that the new station would be known as "Double J" and launch on 30 April; the name is a homage to the original call sign of Triple J, 2JJ (also pronounced Double J). Former Triple J announcer Myf Warhurst was named as Double J's first on-air personality, hosting a weekday afternoon show. Manager Chris Scaddan explained that Double J would take the "best elements" of Triple J's history "into the future with the best new sounds around."

On 28 April 2014, ahead of the launch, the station began stunting with a loop of 13 different versions of "Express Yourself" by N.W.A, including covers by the Audreys, Darren Hanlon and Wagons. The song was chosen in homage to a 1990 industrial action by Triple J relating to their censored airplay of "Fuck tha Police".

Double J officially launched on 30 April 2014 at 12:00 p.m. AEST, with a special presented by Warhurst from the Calvin Club in Melbourne. The launch programme was simulcast by Triple J, and featured introductions to the new station's lineup and programming, as well as live performances by Paul Dempsey and Kate Miller Heidke.

On 19 January 2015, the station broadcast Beat the Drum Again, a special day of programming to commemorate Triple J's 40th anniversary. It included programs staffed by past personalities such as Mikey Robins and Helen Razer, Angela Catterns, Chris & Craig, and Roy & HG, as well as rebroadcasts of 2JJ's first hour on the air, and of Midnight Oil's "Oils on the Water" concert on Goat Island from Triple J's 10th anniversary in 1985.

==== Petition for expansion ====
In March 2022, a group of female Australian singer-songwriters wrote to federal communications minister Paul Fletcher and shadow communications minister Michelle Rowland requesting that Double J be granted an FM licence to enable the station to have a broader reach by allowing it to expand into regional areas of the country.

Missy Higgins, Kasey Chambers, Kate Miller-Heidke, Sarah Blasko, Vikki Thorn and Deborah Conway said that ageing female artists get much less exposure on FM radio than their male counterparts and noted there was no female equivalent to male-orientated FM station Triple M. They said Double J was a station that played a lot of new music by female artists over the age of 30 but its reach was "severely limited". They said an expansion of the station by granting it an FM license, enabling access to a much wider audience, could be a way of getting closer to equality. The women also launched a Change.org petition to garner support from fans.

In response, Rowland and shadow arts minister Tony Burke said moving Double J onto the FM band would be a positive step for Australian music. They said if the Opposition was elected to power at the 2022 Australian federal election, they would examine the issue and work with the ABC and ACMA and consult with musicians. However, they didn't commit to the plan outright.

While visiting the Byron Bay Bluesfest during the campaign, then opposition leader Anthony Albanese said if his party was elected at the election, they would commission the ABC to undertake a feasibility study into extending Double J into regional areas. Albanese declared: "I want more people in regional Australia to experience the joy I have of listening to Double J, singing along to songs they love or maybe discovering something new."

== Programs and presenters ==
As of 2026, the line-up on Double J includes:

- Mornings: hosted by Michael Hing (Mon - Thurs), and Tom Ravenscroft on Friday mornings
- Lunch: hosted by Karen Leng
- Arvos: hosted by Dylan Lewis
- Weekend Mornings: hosted by Yumi Stynes
- Weekend Arvos: hosted by Caz Tran
- Block Party: hip hop music; hosted by Hau Latukefu
- Short Fast Loud: punk, hardcore, metal, alternative music; hosted by Josh Merriel
- Tower of Song: interviews with influential songwriters; hosted by Henry Wagons
- Sky High: soul, funk, r&b, hip hop music; hosted by Hau Latukefu
- Classic Albums: celebrating different classic albums that changed modern music; hosted by Caz Tran
- The J Files: music documentaries; originally aired on Triple J between 1996 and 2007; hosted by Caz Tran.
- The Dinner Mix: weekly guest curated mixtape show; hosted various musicians and artists.

Double J also plays archive content from Triple J, including Live at the Wireless performances.

Long-running music director of Triple J, Richard Kingsmill, hosted a program from 2016 to 2023 called The Funhouse which was one of Double J's longest-running specialty shows at over 350 episodes. It became available to stream as a podcast on ABC Listen and Spotify.

=== Awards ===
Zan Rowe's Take 5 podcast won Gold at the 2020 Australian Podcast Awards for Best Radio Podcast, and Inside The Big Day Out won Silver for the Best Documentary Podcast.
