= Myrtle Meggy =

Australian pianist and pedagogue

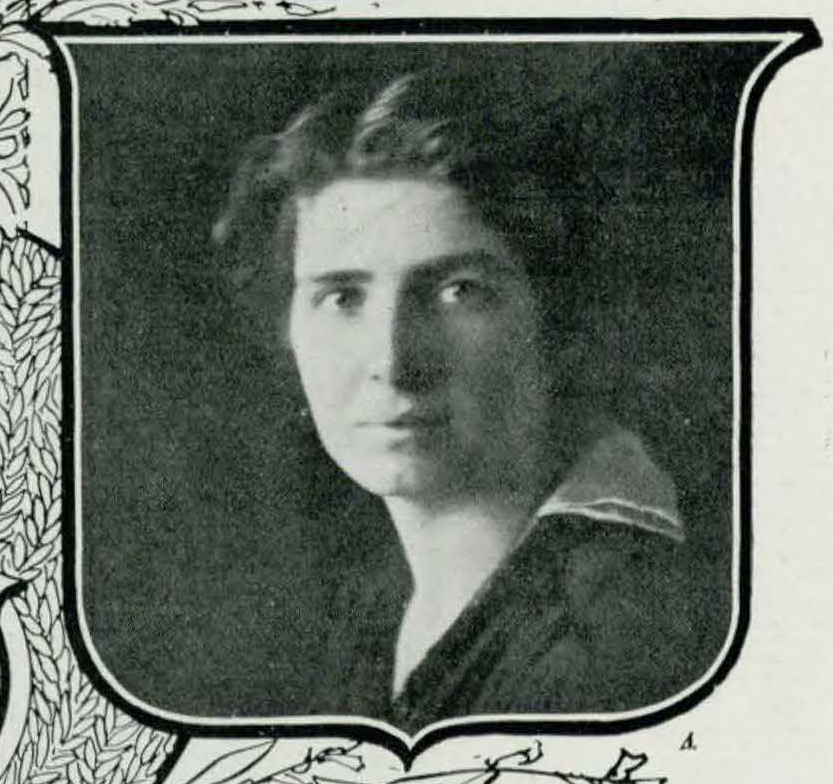
Myrtle Meggy ca.1920

Anna Myrtle Meggy (7 January 1887, Sydney, Australia — 8 February 1959, Sydney) was an Australian pianist and pedagogue.

== Life ==
Meggy was born to Sarah Myrtle Meggy (née Boone) and Percy Robert Meggy in Sydney, Australia. Meggy was the eldest of six children. She came from a large literary family: her father was prolific writer and helped found the Chicago Daily News, while her mother was a published poet.

Meggy received her first music lessons from her father. When she was nine she began studying with Sydney Moss, and gave her first recital at the age of 12. In 1902, she went to London in order to study with Mathilde Verne.

Her first public performance was at the Aeolian Hall in 1905. She soon gave recitals there and at Bechstein Hall. Later she participated in the Proms at Queen's Hall under Sir Henry Wood.

Meggy toured the English provinces with Alice Verlet, and gave concerts in Canada (1906) and Newfoundland. She made an extensive tour (1907) with Emma Albani through Australia, India, New Zealand, Tasmania, and Ceylon. In 1917 she returned to London to give annual recitals, play with the Queen Hall's orchestra under Sir Henry Wood.

Samuel Coleridge-Taylor dedicated to her his valse-suite for piano Three-fours, Op. 71 (1909).

In 1917, Meggy returned to Sydney as a result of the First World War. Four of her siblings - her three brothers and her sister Margaret Helen - served with the First Australian Imperial Force abroad. Two brothers, Albert Edward Meggy and Douglas Acland Meggy, were killed in action, during the Gallipoli campaign and the battle of Pozières respectively.

Upon her return to Australia in 1917, Meggy received an invitation from Henri Verbrugghen to teach at the New South Wales Conservatorium. In June 1918, she gave the first performance of the complete cycle of Beethoven and Mendelssohn cello sonatas in Sydney with James Messeas.

In May 1920, Meggy participated in the Beethoven Festival organized by the Conservatorium. She was one of four pianists to perform piano concertos (along with Laurence Godfrey Smith, Frank Hutchens and Henry Penn). She performed the Fourth on 12 May (with Saint-Saëns' cadenzas).

Among her pupils was Marie van Hove.

== Sources ==
- H. Saxe Wyndham. Who's who in music: A biographical record of contemporary musicians. Boston: Small, Maynard and Co., 1913.
- H.J. Gibbney, Ann G. Smith. A biographical register 1788-1939. Notes from the name index of the Australian Dictionary of Biography. Vol. II: L-Z
