= Violin Sonata in C minor =

Violin Sonata in C minor may refer to:

- Violin Sonata No. 7 (Beethoven)
- Violin Sonata No. 3 (Grieg)
- Violin Sonata No. 4 (Hill)
