= Austral String Quartet =

Austral String Quartet is the name of two Sydney string quartet ensembles:

- Austral String Quartet (1910s), under the leadership of Cyril Monk
- Austral String Quartet (1950s-1970s), under the leadership of Donald Hazelwood
