= Krips =

Krips is a surname. Notable people with the surname include:

- Henry Krips (conductor) (1912–1987), conductor and composer
- Henry Krips (scholar), professor of cultural studies
- Josef Krips, conductor and violinist
- Michel Krips, mayor of the city of Dudelange
