= String Quartet No. 7 =

String Quartet No. 7 may refer to:

- String Quartet No. 7 (Beethoven) by Ludwig van Beethoven
- String Quartet No. 7 (Diamond) by David Diamond
- String Quartet No. 7 (Dvořák) by Antonín Dvořák
- String Quartet No. 7 (Halffter), Espacio de silencio by Cristóbal Halffter
- String Quartet No. 7 (Hill) by Alfred Hill
- String Quartet No. 7 (McCabe), Summer Eves, by John McCabe
- String Quartet No. 7 (Maconchy) by Elizabeth Maconchy
- String Quartet No. 7 (Milhaud), Op. 87, by Darius Milhaud
- String Quartet No. 7 (Mozart) by Wolfgang Amadeus Mozart
- String Quartet No. 7 (Porter) by Quincy Porter
- String Quartet No. 7 (Rihm) by Wolfgang Rihm
- String Quartet No. 7 (Schubert) by Franz Schubert
- String Quartet No. 7 (Shostakovich) by Dmitri Shostakovich
- String Quartet No. 7 (Simpson) by Robert Simpson
- String Quartet No. 7 (Spohr) by Louis Spohr
- String Quartet No. 7 (Villa-Lobos) by Heitor Villa-Lobos
