= Waltzing Matilda (disambiguation) =

"Waltzing Matilda" is an 1895 Australian bush ballad written by Banjo Paterson.

Waltzing Matilda may also refer to:

- Waltzing Matilda (1933 film), an Australian film
- Waltzing Matilda (1958 film), an Australian cartoon short film
- Waltzing Matilda (2023 film), a Czech tragicomedy film
- Waltzing Matilda (album), a 2008 album by André Rieu and Mirusia
- "Tom Traubert's Blues", a 1976 song by Tom Waits sometimes referred to as "Waltzing Matilda"
  - "Tom Traubert's Blues (Waltzing Matilda)", a 1992 cover version by Rod Stewart
- "And the Band Played Waltzing Matilda", a 1971 song by Eric Bogle
- Waltzing Matilda, a section of the 1978 song "Street Hassle" by Lou Reed
