= Violin Sonata No. 4 =

Violin Sonata No. 4 may refer to:

- Violin Sonata No. 4 (Beethoven)
- Violin Sonata No. 4 (Hill)
- Violin Sonata No. 4 (Ives) (Children's Day at the Camp Meeting) by Charles Ives
- Violin Sonata No. 4 (Mozart)
- Violin Sonata No. 4 (Villa-Lobos) by Heitor Villa-Lobos
