= Kripps =

Kripps is a surname. Notable people with the surname include:

- Agnes Kripps (1925–2014), Canadian politician
- Justin Kripps (born 1987), Canadian bobsledder

== See also ==
- Krips
