= Piano Trio in A minor (Hill) =

Musical composition by Alfred Hill

Trio for violin, cello and piano in A minor, Stiles 1.2.2.1 TrA, is one of Alfred Hill's five compositions for such ensemble. It was written probably in 1890s and reconstructed by Allan Stiles in early 2000s. Its approximate duration is 20 minutes.

This Trio was reworked by Hill into his Violin Sonata No. 3 between 1906 and 1910 (while the Sonata itself was later arranged for flute and piano — Flute Sonata No. 2).

== Structure ==
The Trio consists of three movements, all in A minor.

1. Allegro con brio
2. Waiata Aroha. Andantino
3. Finale. Allegro moderato

== Editions ==
- Alfred Hill. Trio in A Minor for violin, violoncello, and pianoforte. [Narara, N.S.W.]: Stiles Music Publications, 2003 (pub. number S66-2003; ISMN 979-0-720029-67-2) — piano score and parts

== Recordings ==
- Salzburg Piano Trio (Salzburger Klaviertrio: Angelika Schopper, Scott Stiles, Caroline Anna Moldaschl) — Hill & Brahms: Piano trios / Klaviertrios — 2004 [SKT 2004-01]
