= String Quartet No. 7 (Hill) =

String Quartet No. 7 in A major, Stiles 1.2.3.3 SQ7, by Australian composer Alfred Hill was commenced in Melbourne and finished in Sydney on 18 November 1934, as stated in the manuscript score preserved in the National Library of Australia. It is thought to be the last of Hill's middle period quartets, with some impressionistic features being transitional to his later compositions.

The pproximate duration is 20.5 minutes.

== Composition and performance history ==
When in 1921 Henri Verbrugghen, the first director of New South Wales State Conservatorium of Music, left Australia for Minneapolis, Alfred Hill was a popular candidate for this position, but W. Arundel Orchard was appointed instead. He retired in 1934, and although Hill was still a popular choice, he was overlooked again in favor of Edgar Bainton. Hill took a year of leave, resigned in 1935 and opened the Alfred Hill Academy of Music (closed in 1937 after a devastating fire). During this short period of 1934–37 Hill composed nine string quartets, first of which was the Seventh.

In an excerpt from his drafted autobiography, entitled A Wonderful Year, Hill describes the year of respite in 1934. He travelled to Melbourne with his wife Mirrie Hill. "What I seemed", wrote Hill, "at the time, to think more important than all, was that I had just finished two string quartets", the quartets being No. 7 (dated 18 November) and No. 8 (dated 6 December). Both are in A major, and hence it is difficult to say which of these was performed, when the sources mention an "A major string quartet" by Hill. At least three performances of an "A major quartet" are known, all in the summer 1935.

== Music ==
The quartet is in four movements.

1. Maestoso — Allegro moderato (A major)
2. Intermezzo. Allegretto (E minor)
3. Andante (C major)
4. Finale. Allegro (A major)

In the first movement, the contrast between the first and second subjects is striking. A relatively brief (as usually in Hill's quartets) development section contains some interesting harmonic progressions. In the outer sections of the second movement pizzicato alternates with arco, contrasting with the wistful melody in the central section. In the Andante hints of impressionism first appear in Hill's quartet writing, though they are not so evident as in the Eighth quartet, composed later that year (1934). The finale is characterised by eloquence rather than drama. At the end of it the opening bars of the first movement are cited, rounding the whole composition.

== Editions ==
- Alfred Hill. String Quartet No. 7 in A. London: Stiles Music Publications, 2002 (pub. number S35-2002; ISMN 979-0-720029-35-1)

== Recordings ==
- A 1961 recording is listed in the Australian Broadcasting Corporation archives, without the names of performers.
- (rec. 2008) Dominion String Quartet (Gezentsvey, Harris, Maurice, Chickering) – (2009) Naxos Records 8.572446.
