= Violin Sonata No. 2 (Hill) =

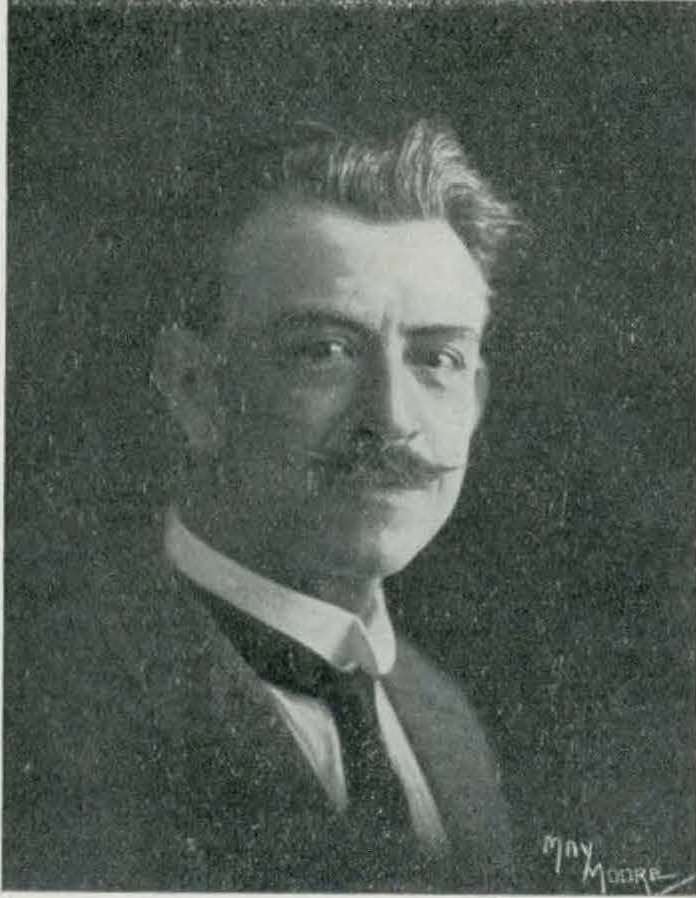
Alfred Hill

Violin Sonata No. 2 in A minor, Stiles 1.2.1.6 So2, is a sonata for violin and piano by Alfred Hill completed at the beginning of 1906. Its manuscript is at the National Library of Australia. It bears inscription: Island Bay Wellington N.Z. 10th January 1906. The sonata is dedicated to an Australian violinist Cyril Monk (Dedicated to my friend Cyril Monk), Hill's pupil in theory and composition. Its approximate duration is 16 minutes.

== Versions for other instruments ==
The Sonata was revised and arranged for oboe and piano, clarinet and piano (both in 1955: revised and arranged for Oboe or Clarinet Sydney, May 29, 1955 by the composer in the manuscript) and for flute and piano (the date is unknown, but from the characteristics of the handwriting it was most probably also in 1950s). The oboe version seems to be lost (there is another Oboe Sonata by Hill). The flute version is known as Flute Sonata in A minor No. 1, as there is another flute sonata in A minor (arranged from Violin Sonata No. 3), though it is unknown which of them was made first.

The arranged versions have independent entries in Stiles's catalogue:

- For flute and piano: 1.2.1.1 SoA1
- For oboe and piano: not listed (lost?)
- For clarinet and piano: 1.2.1.3 SoA

== Structure ==
The sonata is in three movements.

1. Allegro (A minor)
2. Adagio (C♯ minor)
3. Finale. Allegro (A minor)

== Editions ==
For violin and piano

- Alfred Hill. Sonata no. 2 in A minor for violin and pianoforte. Narara, N.S.W.: Stiles Music Publications, 2003 (pub. number S32-2003; ISMN 979-0-720029-32-0)

Arrangements

- Alfred Hill. Sonata no.1 in A minor for flute and pianoforte. Narara, N.S.W.: Stiles Music Publications, 2008 (pub. number S112-2008; ISMN 979-0-720073-29-3)
- Alfred Hill. Sonata in A minor [1] for flute and pianoforte. [Robertson, N.S.W.]: Stiles Music Publications, 2014 (pub. number S164-2014; ISMN 979-0-720073-97-2)
- Alfred Hill. Sonata in A minor for clarinet and pianoforte. Narara, N.S.W.: Stiles Music Publications, 2008 (pub. number S113-2008; ISMN 979-0-720073-30-9)
