= The Ship of Heaven =

1923 Australian light operetta

- Music: Alfred Hill
- Lyrics: Hugh McCrae
- Book: Hugh McCrae
- Premiere: 7 October 1933: Savoy Theatre, Sydney

The Ship of Heaven is a 1923 Australian light operetta (or "musical fantasy") by Hugh McCrae with music by Alfred Hill.

The work was given a private production in 1923.

The original production open to the general public was presented by Doris Fitton's Independent Theatre at the Savoy Theatre.

According to one writer in 1937, "it remainds the best fantasy by an Australian dramatist."

Smith's Weekly called it " one of the most ambitious productions ever planned by a Little Theatre... represents .the work of Australia's greatest living poet, Hugh McCrae, and greatest living composer, Alfred Hill. Between them they have made this romantic operetta a work of memorable beauty.... In its field, "The Ship of Heaven" is easily the most important musical and poetic work that lias, so far been written in Australia."

The text was published by Angus and Robertson in 1951.
