= Violin Sonata No. 3 (Hill) =

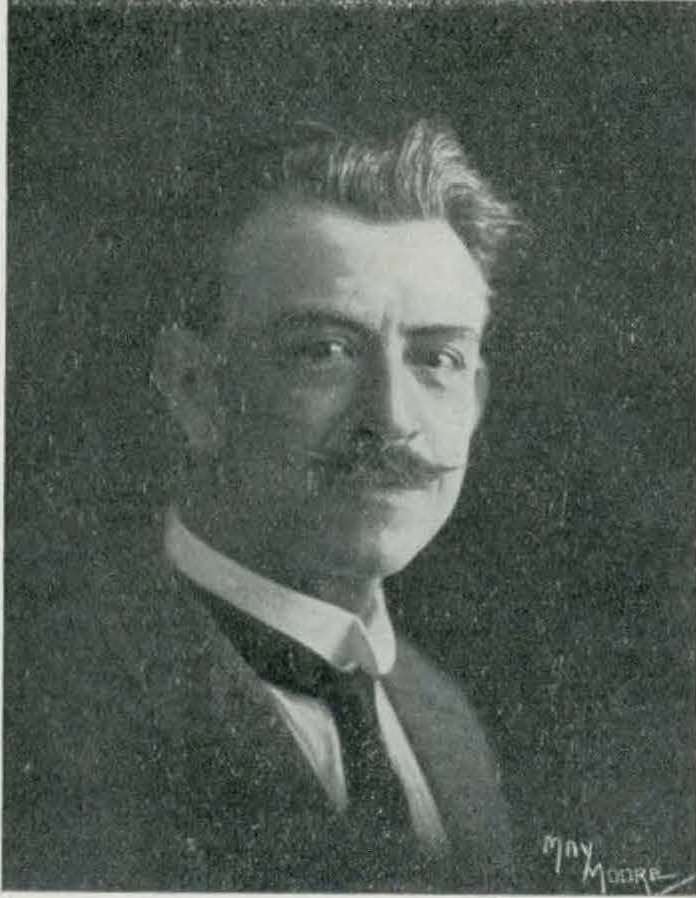
Alfred Hill

Violin Sonata No. 3 in A minor, Stiles 1.2.1.6 So3, is a sonata for violin and piano by Alfred Hill. Its music originates from his Piano Trio in A minor, Stiles 1.2.2.1 TrA (probably 1890s). It has no precise dating, but was obviously finished after Violin Sonata No. 2 (January 1906): most probably in 1907. It was performed on 6 July 1908 at the YMCA Hall in Sydney by Cyril Monk (the dedicatee of Hill's previous sonata) and Constance Brandon Usher. Hill later arranged this sonata for flute and piano (the so-called Flute Sonata No. 2 in A minor, Stiles 1.2.1.1 SoA2).

== Structure ==
The sonata is in three movements, all in A minor.

Original version (for violin and piano)

1. Allegro con brio
2. Waiata Aroha. Andantino
3. Finale. Allegro moderato

Arranged version (for flute and piano)

1. Allegro con brio
2. Waiata Maori. Andantino
3. Finale. Allegro moderato

== Editions ==
For violin and piano

- Alfred Hill. Sonata no. 3 in A minor for violin and pianoforte. Narara, N.S.W.: Stiles Music Publications, 2004 (pub. number S33-2003; ISMN 979-0-720029-33-7) — piano score and violin part

Arrangement

- Alfred Hill. Sonata in A minor [2] for flute and pianoforte. [Robertson, N.S.W.]: Stiles Music Publications, 2014 (pub. number S165-2014; ISMN 979-0-720073-96-5)
