= String Quartet No. 3 (Hill) =

Musical composition by Alfred Hill

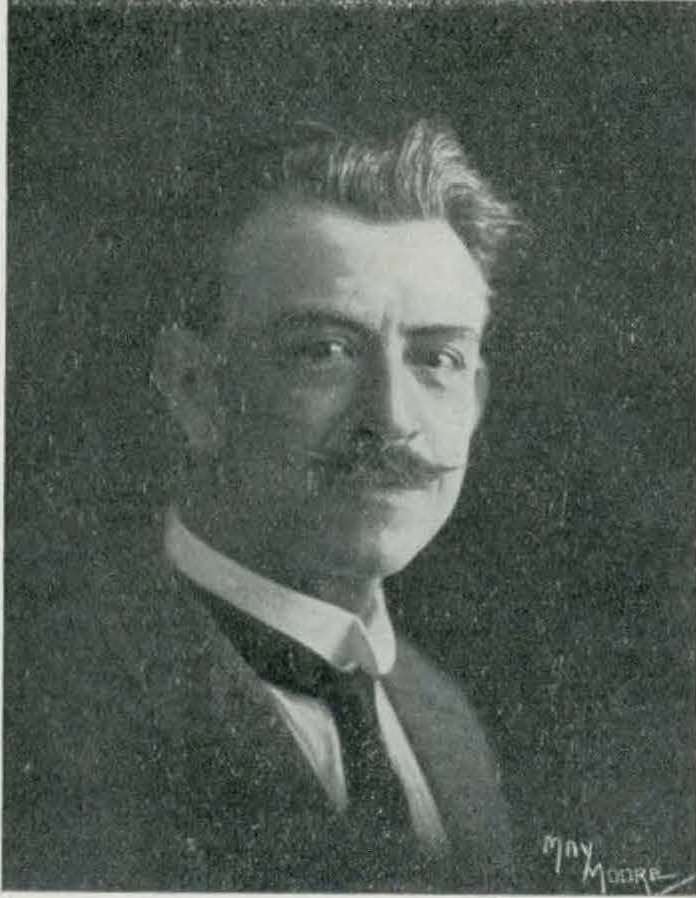
Alfred Hill

Alfred Hill composed his String Quartet No. 3 in A minor "The Carnival", Stiles 1.2.3.3 SQ3, in 1912, while he was a member of the Austral String Quartet. The manuscript score is preserved in the National Library of Australia. In 1955, Hill transformed the quartet into his Symphony No. 5.

The quartet is composed in four movements with an average duration of 20 minutes.

== Background ==
Born in 1870 in Australia (and raised in New Zealand), Alfred Hill was brought up in a rich musical environment; his father was both a hatter and a skilled violinist who often encouraged singing in the household. Hill began playing cornet and toured with the Simonsen Opera Company before switching to violin and viola as his primary instruments. He went on to study at Leipzig Conservatory in 1887, studying violin under Hans Sitt and composition under Gustav Schreck. Additionally, he studied under music scholar Oscar Paul, who, alongside nationalist composers like Dvořák, likely influenced Hill's fascination with the Māori music he incorporated into much of his compositions.

Hill was heavily involved in chamber music performance, serving as a member of the Staell String Quartet from 1897-1899, the Austral String Quartet from 1911–13 (during which time his String Quartet No. 3 was written), and the Conservatorium String Quartet from 1923-1933. While Hill composed 17 string quartets across his career, Nos. 1, 2, and 11 were most frequently performed and were the only ones published in his lifetime. His first three string quartets were composed by 1914, and the others from 1918-1938, many of which were later recomposed as symphonies, with form, melody, and harmony remaining largely unchanged in the recompositions. His String Quartet No. 3 was recomposed in 1955 as his Symphony No. 5 in A minor, "The Carnival," in which the slow movement and the scherzo are in the opposite order compared to the string quartet.

== Analysis ==
The title "Carnival or A Student in Italy for String Quartet" appears on the front page of the manuscript. The quartet is in four movements (discrepancies in titles exist between sources; the alternative titles listed below are found in the Allan Stiles catalogue of Hill's music and in the manuscript score held in the National Library of Australia):

=== I. In the streets. Allegro con fuoco ===
(Alternative titles: In the Streets — A Merry March/ In the Streets)

The first movement is in sonata form. Across his 17 string quartets, Hill uses a standard treatment of sonata form in outer movements, sometimes with an added slow introduction. The primary theme is introduced by the first violin in the key of A minor (i) and is declamatory in style. The contrasting secondary theme in C major (III) is lyrical and is also introduced by the first violin.

=== II. Andantino ===
(Alternative titles: In the Studio — Serious Moods/ Away from the Madding Crowd)

The second movement is in rounded binary form (ABA^{1}). The A section appears in D major (I), the B section goes into E minor (ii) and A major (V), and the repeated A section returns back in D major (I). The first violin introduces the melody and carries the bulk of the melodic material throughout the movement, with a full chordal texture in the accompaniment and short countermelodies.

=== III. Scherzo ===
(Alternative titles: In the Country — Dances on the Green/ Dancing on the Green)

The third movement is the ternary form of a scherzo and trio, with the scherzo section in A major (I) and the trio section in D major (IV), returning to the scherzo and a short coda in A major (I). Again, the melody is introduced by the first violin, then is passed through the ensemble within the scherzo, first to the second violin, then to the viola and cello in octaves. Within the trio section, the melody is shared between the two violins.

=== IV. Finale. Allegro moderato ===
(Alternative titles: Finale — The Carnival/ Carnival — Procession of Priests — The Street Singer)

The fourth movement is in sonata form. Hill uses the same key structure as in the first movement, with the primary theme in A minor (i) and secondary theme in C major (III). The primary theme (introduced by both violins) is folk-like, and the secondary theme (introduced by the first violin) is lyrical.

== Reception and legacy ==
Some of Hill's string quartets, such as his String Quartet No. 2 in G minor, were premiered by the Austral String Quartet, of which Hill was a member at the time. Outside of these performances, spanning from 1939-1959, there were four public concerts consisting entirely of Hill's work. Additionally, with the foundation of the Australian Broadcasting Company in 1939, Hill's music became more widely heard, though only a very limited selection of his work was aired.

The complete 17 string quartets were not recorded until 2008-2015, when the Dominion String Quartet released the complete set under the NAXOS label, suggesting that they have not been very well-known. The Dominion String Quartet's recording of Quartet No. 3 (released along with recordings of Hill's first two quartets) is just over 20 minutes in duration.

== Editions ==
- Alfred Hill. String Quartet No.3 in A Minor "The Carnival". Narara, N.S.W.: Stiles Music Publications, 2005 (ISMN 979-0-720029-73-3)

== Recordings ==
- (rec. 2006) Dominion String Quartet – (2007) Naxos Records 8.570491.
