= John M. Thomson =

New Zealand musicologist (1926–1999)

- Thomson, n.d.
- Born: John Mansfield Thomson; 10 March 1926; Blenheim, New Zealand
- Died: 11 September 1999 (aged 73); Wellington, New Zealand

Academic background
- Education: Victoria University of Wellington

Academic work
- Discipline: Early music and the music of New Zealand
- Institutions: Stout Research Centre for New Zealand Studies; University of Waikato

John Mansfield Thomson (10 March 1926 – 11 September 1999) was a New Zealand musicologist who specialized in early music and the Music of New Zealand. He is known for founding the Early Music journal and for publications on his country's music, such as the 1991 The Oxford History of New Zealand Music. Grove Music Online describes him as "One of New Zealand's leading musicologists, [whose] publications on the country's musical history set benchmarks of accuracy, style and vitality".

== Life and career ==
John Mansfield Thomson was born in Blenheim, New Zealand, on 10 March 1926. In his youth he attended the Nelson School of Music for piano (he later continued instruction in Wellington), while he studied the recorder with Zillah Castle. His parents died in his youth, and he moved to England. While in London, he continued piano with Dorothea Vincent, recorder with Walter Bergmann, and began flute with James Hopkinson. After brief military service from 1944 to 1945, he graduated from Victoria University of Wellington with a Bachelor of Arts for English and History in 1948.

He founded both the Early Music journal, which became a leading publication in its field, and the National Early Music Association of the Britain. Thomson's publications include numerous works on the Music of New Zealand, including the 1991 The Oxford History of New Zealand Music. He also published a book on the life and work of English composer Alfred Hill in 1980. At various times he was an associate of the Stout Research Centre for New Zealand Studies at the Victoria University of Wellington and a research associate of the University of Waikato. His obituary in The Guardian noted how "music was only a cover for what really interested him: meeting artistic and creative personalities, finding material for his own writing and design work".

Later in life he gave tours of New Zealand to both Igor Stravinsky and Michael Tippett. He received an honorary doctor from Victoria University of Wellington in 1991. Thomson died in Wellington on 11 September 1999.

Grove Music Online describes Thomson as "One of New Zealand's leading musicologists, [whose] publications on the country's musical history set benchmarks of accuracy, style and vitality". The Guardian called him "a key figure in the revival of the sympathetic performance of early music" and "one of New Zealand's most effective cultural ambassadors".

== Selected publications ==
- Thomson, John M. (1970). "The Role of the Pioneer Composer: some Reflections on Alfred Hill 1870–1960". Studies in Music [Australia]. 4: 52–61.
- —— (1980). A Distant Music: the Life and Times of Alfred Hill 1870–1960. Auckland: Oxford University Press Australia. ISBN 978-0-19-554347-6.
- —— (1984). Musical Delights: a Cavalcade of Cartoon and Caricature. New York: Thames and Hudson. ISBN 978-0-500-01343-4.
- —— (1980). "A Question of Authenticity: Alfred Hill, Ovide Musin, the Chevalier de Kontski and the Wellington Orchestral Society, 1892–1896". Turnbull Library Record. 13: 80–92.
- —— (1997). "The Path to Bayreuth: Friedelind Wagner's 1962 Masterclass and the Influence of Walter Felsenstein (1901–1973)". In Drake, Warren (ed.). Liber amicorum John Steele. Stuyvesant: Pendragon Press. pp. 453–470. ISBN 978-0-945193-80-7.
