= String Quartet No. 8 (Hill) =

String Quartet No. 8 in A major, Stiles 1.2.3.3 SQ8, by Australian composer Alfred Hill was finished half month after his Seventh: the manuscript score and parts, which are preserved in the National Library of Australia, are dated 6 December 1934. While the previous quartet was a somewhat transitive composition from his middle period, with the Eighth one starts counting Hill's late quartets. It is thematically unified and has many impressionistic features. In 1950s, Hill arranged it into a string symphony (No. 8), the first known performance of which was on 27 March 1957.

The approximate duration of the quartet is 25–28 minutes.

== Composition and performance history ==
When in 1921 Henri Verbrugghen, the first director of New South Wales State Conservatorium of Music, left Australia for Minneapolis, Alfred Hill was a popular candidate for this position, but W. Arundel Orchard was appointed instead. He retired in 1934, and although Hill was still a popular choice, he was overlooked again in favor of Edgar Bainton. Hill took a year of leave, resigned in 1935 and opened the Alfred Hill Academy of Music (closed in 1937 after a devastating fire). During this short period of 1934–1937 Hill composed nine string quartets, first of which was the Seventh.

In an excerpt from his drafted autobiography, entitled A Wonderful Year, Hill describes the year of respite in 1934. He travelled to Melbourne with his wife Mirrie Hill. "What I seemed", wrote Hill, "at the time, to think more important than all, was that I had just finished two string quartets", the quartets being No. 7 (dated 18 November) and No. 8 (dated 6 December). Both are in A major, and hence it is difficult to say which of these was performed, when the sources mention an "A major string quartet" by Hill. At least three performances of an "A major quartet" are known, all in the summer 1935.

== Structure ==
The quartet is in four movements.

1. Allegro deciso –Andante – Allegro (A major)
2. Intermezzo. Allegro (A major)
3. Andante (tonal uncertainty)
4. Finale. Allegro — Allegretto commodo (A major)

== Editions ==
- Alfred Hill. String Quartet No. 8 in A. London: Stiles Music Publications, 2008 (pub. number S95-2008; ISMN 979-0-720073-05-7)

== Recordings ==
- (rec. 2008) Dominion String Quartet (Gezentsvey, Harris, Maurice, Chickering) – (2008) Naxos Records 8.5720976.
