= Symphony No. 4 (Hill) =

Symphony No. 4 in C minor "The Pursuit of Happiness", Stiles 1.3.4.1 SyP, was finished by Alfred Hill in 1954 or 1955. Its first two movements were arranged from Hill's String Quartet No. 4 (1916), while the last one derives from the finale of his String Quartet No. 17 (1938; this whole quartet was later turned into the Short Symphony, 1958). The symphony is dedicated "to my esteemed friend Henry Kripps", a prominent Australian conductor. Its approximate duration is 20 minutes.

== History ==
The manuscript score and parts of the symphony are preserved at the National Library of Australia. The score carries on the title page a Bertrand Russell quotation:

Whether your life is a happy or an unhappy one is likely to depend on your work as much as upon any one factor. There are few greater sources of happiness than really creative work. In its highest flights this must always be the privilege of exceptionally gifted people, but in humbler form it could be very common.

and an epigram by William Morris:

Happiness without daily work is impossible.

== Music ==
The symphony is scored for a full orchestra.

Quiet unusual in Hill's output, this symphony has only three movements (like the Short Symphony).

1. The Search (C minor)
2. The Heart of man (A♭ major)
3. Finale. The Solution (C minor)

The original quartets had no program, but for the new symphony Hill wrote explanatory notes. They were transferred in a type written sheet attached to the score.

The Search. The introductory Allegro represents the hazy country, the Kingdom of Happiness, shadowed by dreams. The first subject of the movement gropes in the dark for light that is always there, if unseen, with the second providing a glimpse of some impossible heaven. The coda suggests that the evening of life may bring joy.

The second movement, The Heart of Man, presents the heart of man as an exquisitely tender thing, with a second subject standing for human aspirations towards the highest goal.

The Finale, The Solution, suggests in its first subject that the great source of happiness is work, useful, creative and constructive. The second subject adds that work brings joy, followed by a chorale that proposes the idea that even the humblest form of work will make us thankful for the gift of life.

== Analysis ==
The opening introduction to the first movement is remarkable for its dominant prolongation with a sense of tonal ambiguity (the so-called Tristan chord used in parallel motion). It contrasts with the clear tonality of the first subject. All this can be found already in the original 1916 quartet.

At the end of the slow movement the composer added characteristic progressions of juxtaposed triads based on the relationship of the thirds. Such triads can also be found in the finales of the Symphony No. 6 and the Symphony No. 12.

The addition of a magnificent brass apotheosis of the choral motive in the final movement forms extra 26 bars and shows the largest alternation from the original composition among all Hill's arranged symphonies for full orchestra.

== Editions ==
The symphony remains unpublished.

== Recordings ==
- (rec. 1983) Melbourne Symphony Orchestra, Wilfred Lehmann — (1985) Marco Polo 8.220345 (CD) / 6.220345 (LP)
