= EG Awards of 2011 =

Annual Australian music awards ceremony

- Date: 23 November 2011
- Venue: Prince Bandroom, Melbourne, Victoria

Highlights
- Most wins: Gotye (3)

The EG Awards of 2011 are the sixth Annual The Age EG (Entertainment Guide) Awards and took place at the Prince Bandroom on 23 November 2011.

== Hall of Fame inductees ==
Hoodoo Gurus and Stephen 'The Ghost' Walker.

== Award nominees and winners ==
Winners indicated below in boldface

Best Album	Best Song
**The Wagons - Rumble, Shake & Tumble**	**Gotye featuring Kimbra - "Somebody That I Used to Know"**
Best Male	Best Female
**Gotye**	**Clare Bowditch**
Best Band	Best New Talent
**The Wagons**	**Royal Headache**
Best Tour	Outstanding Achievement By a Victorian Artist
**Blondie and The Pretenders - (Palais Theatre/A Day on the Green)**	**Gotye**
