= Symphony No. 1 (Hill) =

Musical composition by Alfred Hill

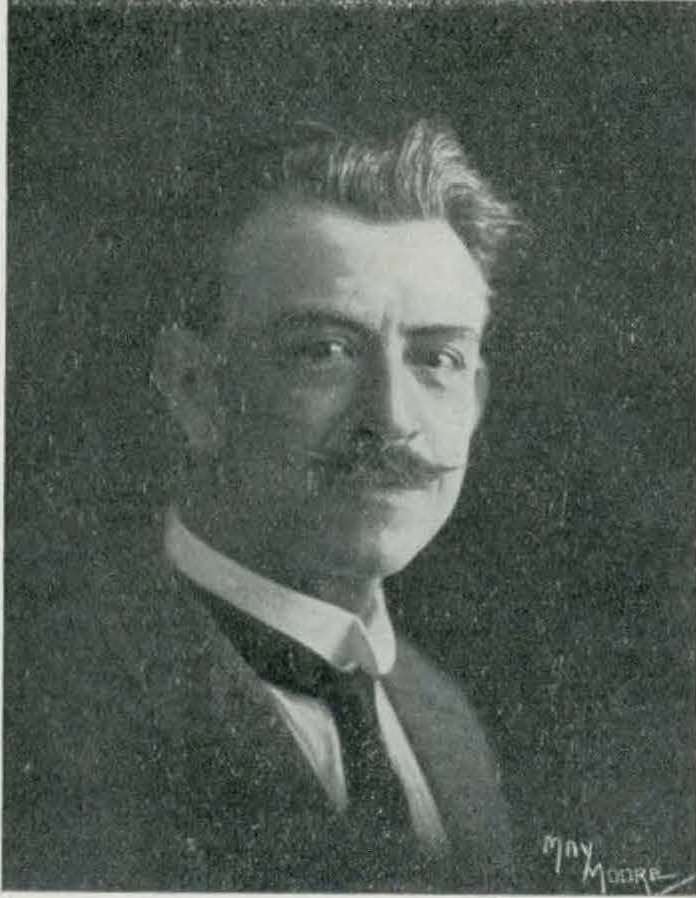
Alfred Hill

Symphony No. 1 in B♭ major, Stiles 1.3.4.1 Sy1, the so-called Maori Symphony, is the first symphony by Alfred Hill. Its first three movements were completed by 1898, but the last movement remained unfinished. This may have been the second symphony composed in the Antipodes (the first was George Marshall-Hall's C minor completed in Melbourne in December 1892). The first two movements (and maybe the fourth, if it was reconstructed correctly) of this symphony are the only symphonic movements by Hill not to be arranged from his earlier chamber music. The Finale was reconstructed by Allan Stiles, and the whole symphony got its first performance in 2007. The approximate duration is 40 minutes.

== History ==
=== The unfinished composition ===
Hill could begin composing the first movement of the symphony in his Leipzig years (between 1887 and 1891). Originally it had no program. The first three movements are prefaced with some poems by Thomas Bracken related to Māori, but they were not initially intended for this piece: Hill added them after the success of his cantata Hinemoa. According to Allan Stiles, there are no real Māori musical elements in the symphony. The first two movements were prefaced with extracts from the poem The March of Rauparaha, the third with part of the poem Waipounamutu. These inscriptions led the symphony to bear the subtitle Maori in some sources.

The unfinished symphony may have been intended for a Wellington orchestra Hill conducted in 1892-1896. There are several reasons to think so: only two horns are required as well as two hand-tuned timpani (rather than pedal tuned ones). There is a copyist's contrabass part of the first three movements at the Mitchell Library, dated 1898, which gives the terminus ante quem for them.

The manuscripts of the first three movements are located at the National Library of Australia in Canberra. The draft score of the finale was nearly completed: it lacks only the timpani part and dynamics (music), some brass parts are incomplete. Allan Stiles proposes two reasons why this composition remained unfinished: the one being Hill's growing interest in theatrical music, the other being the unlikely prospect of a complete performance.

=== Performance history and the final completion ===
Two of the three completed movements have been performed on several occasions, with different titles. The first (Allegro con brio) was performed in Melbourne in 1913 as Te Rauparaha Symphonic Poem. The second (Adagio) was performed as Tangi in Sydney (1899), then in Wellington (1907 and 1909) and in London (Crystal Palace, 18 July 1911). It is unknown whether the Scherzo has ever been performed, but it definitely originates from an early version of Hill's String Quartet No. 1 written in Leipzig (this first scherzo was later substituted in the Quartet with another one and eventually made its way into String Quartet No. 4).

The symphony was edited by Richard Divall without any finale at all. After years of research, Allan Stiles identified and reconstructed the unfinished movement. His edition of the complete work was premiered on 15 July 2007 by the Wellington Chamber Orchestra under Professor Donald Maurice.

For the Finale Stiles used the 1903 Inaugural march used for the opening of Her Majesty's Theatre in Sydney. It was then included in Hill's unperformed opera Don Quixote (as overture) and later used in his film music for Smithy (Pacific Flight). Stiles claims the Inaugural march was rescored from the unfinished symphony's last movement. To back this hypothesis he lists similarity of music paper types, key, orchestration, and handwriting. However, Rhoderick McNeill thinks that the verdict of its status within the symphony remains open, as it is quite different from all the finales of Hill's string quartets and symphonies.

== Structure ==
The symphony is in four movements.

1. Adagio ma non troppo – Allegro con brio (B♭ major)
2. Adagio molto espressivo (E♭ major)
3. Scherzo. Presto (F major)
4. March. Maestoso (B♭ major)

The first movement containing 559 bars and lasting about 18 minutes is the longest in all Hill's instrumental output. It is in a sonata form. The Adagio is in a simple ternary form with a funeral march in C minor as a central section. The third movement is an uncomplicated scherzo with a trio. The F major cadenza it ends with, according to Stiles, is "incomplete", and he deduces from it a link to the timpani roll on F beginning the reconstructed finale. It opens with a fanfare-like introduction and proceeds to the main A section. Then comes the trio (in E♭ major), a transition with a reprise of part of the fanfare and a full orchestral return of the A section (with reversed order of melodic material).

== Editions ==
- Alfred Hill. Symphony No. 1. Score. Australia: Stiles Music Publications, 2004 (ISMN 979-0-720029-52-8)
- Alfred Hill. Symphony No. 1. Score, 2nd ed. Australia: Stiles Music Publications, 2011 (ISMN 979-0-720073-65-1)
