= Jenny Cullen =

American violinist (1890–1957)

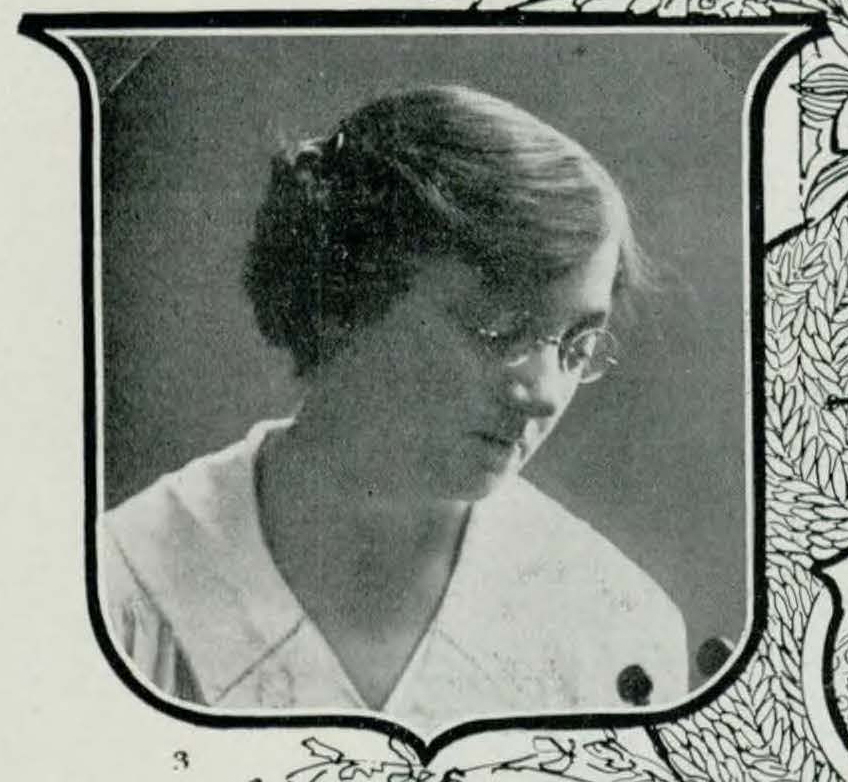
Jenny Cullen ca.1920

Jenny Cullen (1890–1957) was a violinist and the first female member of the Minneapolis Symphony Orchestra. She was a member of Verbrugghen String Quartet founded by Henri Verbrugghen.

She began violin studies at the age of 8. At the age of 13 she came under the direction of Verbrugghen. She attended the Scottish Academy of Music, studied with Verbrugghen in Glasgow and played in the Scottish Symphony Orchestra. At the age of 18 she was appointed Senior Professor at the Athenaeum School of Music, Glasgow. A year later she became the second violin in the Verbrugghen Quartet.

In 1911 Cullen went to Russia to play at the Summer Symphony Concerts in Pavlovsk, Saint Petersburg. In 1915 she gave recitals at the Three B's Festival in London under Verbrugghen as conductor.

When Verbrugghen moved to Australia with his quartet (1915), she became concertmaster of the State Symphony Orchestra of Sydney and principal violin instructor. Again together with Verbrugghen she went to Minneapolis. Cullen played in the Minneapolis Symphony Orchestra from 1924 to 1932. She was then head of the violin department at Carleton College and on the faculty of the University of Minnesota and Hamline University. In 1942 she was again engaged by the Minneapolis Symphony Orchestra by Dimitri Mitropoulos. She left it in 1949, when Antal Doráti became director. The rest of her life she spent teaching and playing chamber music.

She always wore blue, unless she was dressed in black for a performance.

== Sources ==
- Sondra Wieland Howe (November 7, 2013). Women Music Educators in the United States: A History. Scarecrow Press. pp. 144–145. ISBN 978-0-8108-8848-7.
