= Violin Sonata No. 4 (Hill) =

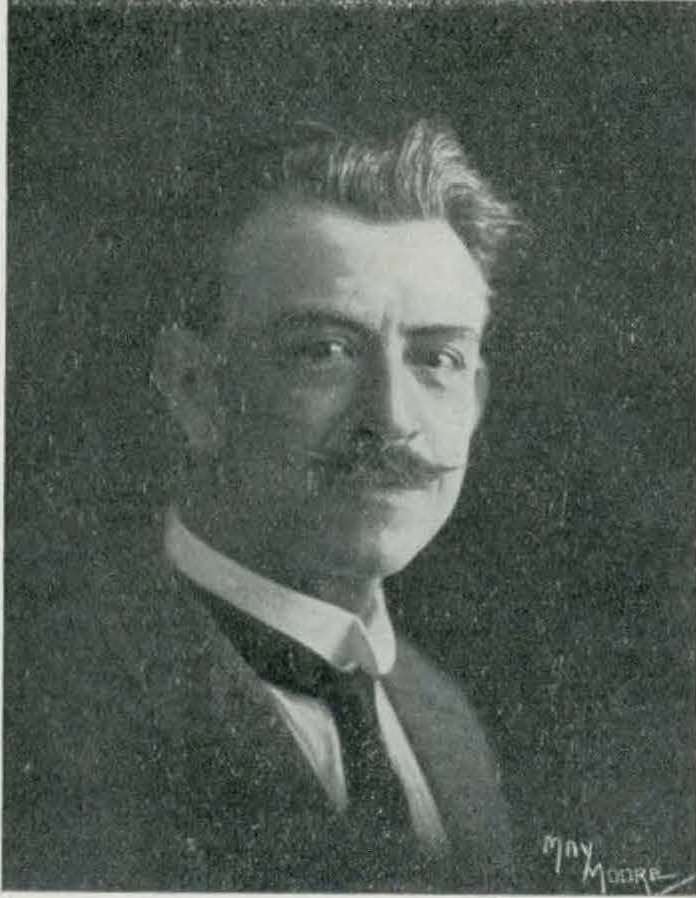
Alfred Hill

Violin Sonata No. 4 in C minor "Maori Sonata", Stiles 1.2.1.6 So4, is a sonata for violin and piano by Alfred Hill composed ca.1909. It was premiered on 6 April 1910 by Cyril Monk and Laurence Godfrey Smith in the YMCA Hall, Sydney. Its approximate duration is 18 minutes.

== History ==
The "Maori" Sonata is part of a series of Hill's works dealing with Māori material, all originating from his New Zealand years (1892–1896 and 1902–1910). Other notable works of this group are cantata Hinemoa, opera Tapu, his most popular song Waiata Poi and two String Quartets (No. 1 and No. 2). All the three movements of the sonata are based on the Māori tunes Hill collected in the previous years. The precise circumstances of its creation remain unknown. The manuscript score is in the National Library of Australia.

The Sonata was later (ca.1915) transcribed by Hill (as was his habit) into an orchestral work Maori Rhapsody. Nothing is known about the origins and performance circumstances of it. The sonata was also arranged by Michael Vidulich as a viola concerto (not to be confused with Hill's original Viola Concerto).

== Structure ==
The sonata is in three movements.

1. Death Defiance (Waiata Maori)
2. Tangi (Lament)
3. Waiata Poi

== Editions ==
- Alfred Hill. Sonata no. 4 in C Minor 'Maori Sonata' for violin and pianoforte. Narara, N.S.W.: Stiles Music Publications, 2007 (ISMN 979-0-720029-77-1)

== Recordings ==
RNZ Concert recorded a performance of the sonata by Ronald Woodcock (violin) and Colleen Rae-Gerrard (piano).

Donald Maurice and the Massey Chamber Orchestra recorded the arrangement by Michael Vidulich of the sonata as a viola concerto for Hill Records.
