= Symphony No. 11 (Hill) =

Symphony No. 11 in E♭ major "The Four Nations" for string orchestra, Stiles 1.3.3.1 SyFN, was arranged by Australian composer Alfred Hill from his String Quartet No. 5 "The Allies" at some point in 1950s, but the precise date remains unknown, and there is no information about the first performance. The music of the symphony follows that of the original string quartet, except for the finale being four bars shorter than in the quartet, due to a minor truncation of the melody of the main subject at each repeat of it. The most obvious difference is the addition of the double bass part. Hill also altered the title of the composition.

== Music ==
The symphony is scored for a standard string orchestra: violins I and II, violas, cellos and double basses.

The symphony is in four parts, each presenting a nation.

1. France: Artistic. Allegro risoluto – Andantino (E♭ major)
2. America: Syncopated. Intermezzo. Allegretto moderato (G minor)
3. Italy: Romantic. Andantino (G major)
4. Great Britain: Nautical. Finale. Allegro (E♭ major)

== Editions ==
- Alfred Hill. Symphony in E♭ for string orchestra : The Four Nations. Narara: Stiles Music Publications, 2008 (pub. number S103-2008; ISMN 979-0-720073-07-1)
