= Henry Wagons =

- Henry Wagons at AmericanaFest 2026

Background information
- Origin: Melbourne, Victoria, Australia
- Genre: Alternative country
- Years active: 1999–present
- Label: ABC Music
- Member of: Wagons
- Website: http://www.wagonsmusic.com

Henry Josef Wagons is an Australian singer/songwriter, musician, radio & TV personality and frontman of the outlaw country rock band, Wagons (band) who have released seven albums in Australia, and made their U.S. debut with 2011's Rumble, Shake and Tumble.

== Background ==
Henry Wagons is the grandson of Henry Krips, a Viennese emigree, principal conductor of the Adelaide Symphony Orchestra.

Apart from his career as a recording artist, Henry is also a TV presenter and radio broadcaster. Henry Wagons was named by The Age Melbourne Magazine as one of the Top 100 Most Influential People in Melbourne in 2009.

== Early bands ==
In the late 1990s, Wagons played as a keyboardist in a noise group called Dworzec, which was inspired by Krautrock and bands on New Zealand label Flying Nun. Wagons played as a bassist in the rock bands Breaking the Law and The Ancients.

In 1999, Wagons formed alt-country rock band Wagons (band), who have released seven albums in Australia between 2000 and 2014

== TV, radio and media interests ==
Wagons was a regular segment presenter/reporter on ABC TV’s Art Nation and Sunday Arts for three years, as well as having had a regular spot on adult-contemporary music program Dig TV, bursting into people’s houses at random and critiquing their record collections. He has made multiple TV appearances on music shows, RocKwiz and Spicks and Specks. In 2014, Henry hosted the episode "RocKwiz Backstage at Bluesfest with Henry Wagons".

In 2014 Henry hosted a BBQ cooking show Keepers Of The Flame on network television Channel 10, while also hosting interview series ‘Rogue Tales’ for James Squire.

Wagons is the host of Tower Of Song, a national Americana/roots radio show, broadcast weekly on digital radio station Double J.

== Solo career ==
In 2012 Wagons released his first solo offering Expecting Company; a mini album of duets featuring collaborations with Alison Mosshart (The Kills/Dead Weather), Robert Forster, Gossling, Patience Hodgson, Canada's Jenn Grant and others.

On 6 March 2013, Henry Wagons recorded Upstairs at United Vol. 9. Henry presents seven songs including an Elvis cover and a Waylon Jennings cover. Upstairs At United is a series of all analog, direct to tape, live studio recordings, taped above the United Records Pressing Plant, Nashville.

His debut full-length solo album After What I Did Last Night... was released in February 2016 on ABC Music.

== Discography ==
=== Albums ===
List of albums
Title	album details
Expecting Company?	Released: 2012; Label: Spunk Records (URA403); Formats: CD, Digital
After What I Did Last Night...	Released: 12 February 2016; Label: Henry Wagons/ ABC/ Universal Music Australia (4768123); Formats: CD, Digital
South of Everywhere	Released: 3 February 2023; Label: Cheatin’ Hearts Records / Spunk Records (URA6045); Formats: CD, Digital
The Four Seasons	Released: 16 August 2024; Label: Cheatin’ Hearts Records / Warner; Formats: CD, Digital

== Awards and nominations ==
=== AIR Awards ===
The Australian Independent Record Awards (commonly known informally as AIR Awards) is an annual awards night to recognise, promote and celebrate the success of Australia's Independent Music sector.

Year	Nominee / work	Award	Result	Ref.
2017	After What I Did Last Night	Best Independent Country Album	Won	
2024	South of Everywhere	Best Independent Country Album or EP	Nominated	
2025	Four Seasons	Best Independent Country Album or EP	Nominated	

=== ARIA Music Awards ===
The ARIA Music Awards is an annual award ceremony event celebrating the Australian music industry.

Year	Nominee / work	Award	Result	Ref.
2023	South of Everywhere	Best Country Album	Nominated	
2024	The Four Seasons	Best Country Album	Nominated	

=== Country Music Awards of Australia ===
The Country Music Awards of Australia is an annual awards night held in January during the Tamworth Country Music Festival. Celebrating recording excellence in the Australian country music industry. They commenced in 1973.

Year	Nominee / work	Award	Result	Ref.
2025	The Four Seasons	Album of the Year	Pending	
2025	The Four Seasons	Alt. Country Album of the Year	Pending	

=== EG Awards / Music Victoria Awards ===
The EG Awards (known as Music Victoria Awards since 2013) are an annual awards night celebrating Victorian music. They commenced in 2006.

Year	Nominee / work	Award	Result	Ref.
2012	Henry Wagons	Best Male	Nominated	
2016	Henry Wagons	Best Male	Nominated	
2023	Henry Wagons	Best Country Work	Nominated	

=== National Live Music Awards ===
The National Live Music Awards (NLMAs) are a broad recognition of Australia's diverse live industry, celebrating the success of the Australian live scene. The awards commenced in 2016.

Year	Nominee / work	Award	Result	Ref.
2017	Henry Wagons	Live Country or Folk Act of the Year	Nominated	

== See also ==
- Wagons (band)
