= Waltzing Matilda (1958 film) =

1958 Australian cartoon short

Waltzing Matilda is a 1958 Australian cartoon short based on the song Waltzing Matilda which aired on the ABC.

It is a five-minute film produced from 4,500 drawings by Australian Rowl Greenhalgh and a team of 14 artists. Henry Krips arranged soundtrack music for the orchestra. It was first broadcast in December 1958 and repeated in July 1959 and January 1960.
