= Henry Krips (scholar) =

Australian academic

Henry Paul Krips is an Australian academic who is the Andrew W. Mellon All-Claremont Chair of Humanities and Professor of Cultural Studies at Claremont Graduate University in Claremont, California. He specializes in Contemporary European Cultural Theory, Psychoanalysis, and Science Studies.

== Education ==
Krips received a B.Sc. Honors degree from the University of Adelaide in 1965 and a Ph.D. in Mathematical Physics in 1970. His dissertation was on Measurement Theory.

== Publications ==
Krips' publications include Fetish: An Erotics of Culture (Cornell University Press, 1999), Der Andere Schauplatz: Psychoanalyse, Kultur, Medien (Turia Kant, Vienna, 2001), Science, Reason and Rhetoric (University of Pittsburgh Press, 1995), and The Metaphysics of Quantum Theory (Oxford, Clarendon Press, 1987).

== Positions ==
Krips has held the Silverman visiting chair for History and Philosophy of Science and Ideas at the University of Tel Aviv, and has been a Senior Fellow at the Max Planck Institute for the History of Science in Berlin, the Institute for Advanced Studies at Central European University in Budapest, and the IFK (Internationales Forschungszentrum Kulturwissenschaften) in Vienna.

Krips is on the board of the Association for Psychoanalysis, Culture and Society, and chairs the division for Theories of Culture in the American Cultural Studies Association.

Krips is the son of the Austrian-Australian conductor and composer, Henry Krips, and a nephew of the conductor and violinist, Josef Krips.
