= David Eccles Nichols =

English violist (1873–1962)

David Eccles Nichols (1873, in Holbeck, Yorkshire – 1962, in Aberdeen) was a violist, member of the Verbrugghen String Quartet and the Fellowes String Quartet.
