= Wagons (band) =

Australian band

- Origin: Melbourne, Victoria, Australia
- Genre: Alternative country
- Years active: 1999–present
- Labels: Spunk! Thirty Tigers; Six Shooter; Chapter Music
- Members: Henry Wagons (Henry Krips) - Vocals, Guitar, Keyboard; Mark "Tuckerbag" Dawson - Drums, Bass Guitar; Si "Philanthropist" Francis – Drums, Bass guitar Richard Blazé - Guitar; John Guscott - Guitar; Matthew "Softmoods" Hassett – Keyboards, Backing Vocals
- Website: https://www.wagonsmusic.com

Wagons are an Australian alt-country band from Melbourne, Australia, led by singer/songwriter/television and radio presenter Henry Wagons.

== History ==
The band was formed in Melbourne in 1999 by Henry Wagons with his school friends from Glen Waverley in Melbourne; Si "The Philanthropist" Francis, Richard Blazé, Steve "Harmony" Hassett and Mark "Tuckerbag" Dawson.

The band has cited influences including Johnny Cash, Scott Walker, Nick Cave and Vegas-era Elvis on their musical style. A regular feature of their live shows is a version of the Wayfaring Strangers song "Willie Nelson". They are known for their energetic and dramatic indie country rock performances in which Henry Wagons engages in banter with the audience between songs.

Henry Wagons is the grandson of Henry Krips, a Viennese emigree conductor of the South Australian Symphony Orchestra. He was named one of the 100 most influential people in Melbourne by the AGE magazine in 2009. Prior to forming the band, Henry (as Henry Krips), was synthesizer player in a Melbourne improvisational quartet called Dworzec.

Wagons released their first album in 2000. On 11 March 2002 they released their second album Trying To Get Home on Chapter Music.

On 26 July 2004, they released Draw Blood on Spunk Records. The Curse of Lightning was released on 15 October 2007 on Spunk Records.

The Rise and Fall of Goodtown was released on 21 April 2009 on Spunk Records. The album was produced by Cornel Wilczek. In 2009 they won The Age EG Best Band and Best Album awards.

Rumble Shake and Tumble was released on 16 August 2011 on Spunk Records, and was again produced by Cornel Wilczek. Wagons toured in the US and Canada appearing at the Bumbershoot festival in Seattle in September 2011. They won The Age EG awards for Best Band, and the Best Album award for Rumble Shake and Tumble. The album also won the Best Independent Country Album award in the Jägermeister Independent Music Awards 2011.

Wagons performed in the US and appeared at SXSW in March 2011.

Acid Rain and Sugar Cane was released on 16 May 2014 on Spunk Records. The album was produced by Mick Harvey of the Bad Seeds, who also played on the album. Wagons again toured North America in 2014 appearing at festivals including the Vancouver Folk Festival, Montreal Jazz Festival, and RBC Ottawa Bluesfest.

Wagons have toured extensively in Australia as well as in New Zealand, the US and Canada, appearing at music festivals including SXSW, Bumbershoot, Montreal Jazz Festival, Bluesfest, Big Day Out and Laneway.

== Members ==
=== Current ===
- Henry Wagons – vocals, guitar, keyboard
- Mark "Tuckerbag" Dawson – drums, bass guitar
- Si "Philanthropist" Francis – drums, Bass guitar
- Richard Blazé – guitar
- John Guscott – guitar
- Matthew "Softmoods" Hassett – keyboards, backing vocals

=== Former members ===
- Chad Mason
- Steve "Harmony" Hassett
- Chris Altmann

== Awards and nominations ==
=== AIR Awards ===
The Australian Independent Record Awards (commonly known informally as AIR Awards) is an annual awards night to recognise, promote and celebrate the success of Australia's Independent Music sector.

Year	Nominee / work	Award	Result
2011	Rumble Shake and Tumble	Best Independent Country Album	Won

=== EG Awards/Music Victoria Awards ===
The Music Victoria Awards (previously known as The Age EG Awards and The Age Music Victoria Awards) are an annual awards night celebrating Victorian music.

Year	Nominee / work	Award	Result
2009	themselves	Best Band	Nominated
2009	The Rise and Fall of Goodtown	Best Album	Nominated
2011	themselves	Best Band	Won
2011	Rumble Shake and Tumble	Best Album	Won
2014	themselves	Best Band	Nominated
2014	Acid Rain & Sugar Cane	Best Country Album	Nominated

== Discography ==
=== Albums ===
List of albums
Title	album details
Wretched Soul	Released: 2000; Label: Segway Records (SR01); Formats: CD
Trying to Get Home	Released: March 2002; Label: Chapter Music (CH42); Formats: CD
Draw Blood	Released: July 2004; Label: Spunk (URA127); Formats: CD, digital download
The Curse of Lightning	Released: October 2007; Label: Spunk (URA231); Formats: CD, digital download
The Rise and Fall of Goodtown	Released: 21 April 2009; Label: Spunk (URA283); Formats: CD, digital download, vinyl
Rumble, Shake and Tumble	Released: 16 August 2011; Label: Spunk (URA351); Formats: CD, digital download, vinyl
Acid Rain & Sugar Cane	Released: 16 May 2014; Label: Spunk (URA458); Formats: CD, digital download, vinyl
Songs from the Aftermath	Released: 9 August 2019; Label: Spunk; Formats: CD, digital download, vinyl, streaming
