= String Quartet No. 6 (Hill) =

String Quartet No. 6 in G major "The Kids", Stiles 1.2.3.3 SQ6, by Alfred Hill bears dedication: "for the young fry at the New South Wales State Conservatorium of Music". It was most likely written for the student string quartet groups at the Conservatorium mentored by the composer. The manuscript is dated 3 September 1927. Its technical demands being limited, it is an accessible for amateurs composition. The quartet is set in earlier style, reminiscent of Haydn, Schubert, and other classical composers.

With an approximate duration of only 15–16 minutes, this is the shortest of all Hill's quartets.

== Structure ==
The quartet is in four movements.

1. Allegro (G major)
2. Scherzo. Allegro (E♭ major)
3. Adagio ma non troppo (C minor)
4. Finale. Allegretto (G major)

== Editions ==
- Alfred Hill. String Quartet No.6 in G : The Kids Quartet. Narara: Stiles Music Publications, 2006 (pub. number S69-2006; ISMN 979-0-20029-72-6)

== Recordings ==
- (rec. 1994) Australian String Quartet (Hennessy, Lea, Crellin, Laurs) — (1997) Marco Polo 8.223746.
- (rec. 2007) Dominion String Quartet (Gezentsvey, Pucher, Maurice, Chickering) – (2008) Naxos Records 8.572097.
