= Verbrugghen String Quartet =

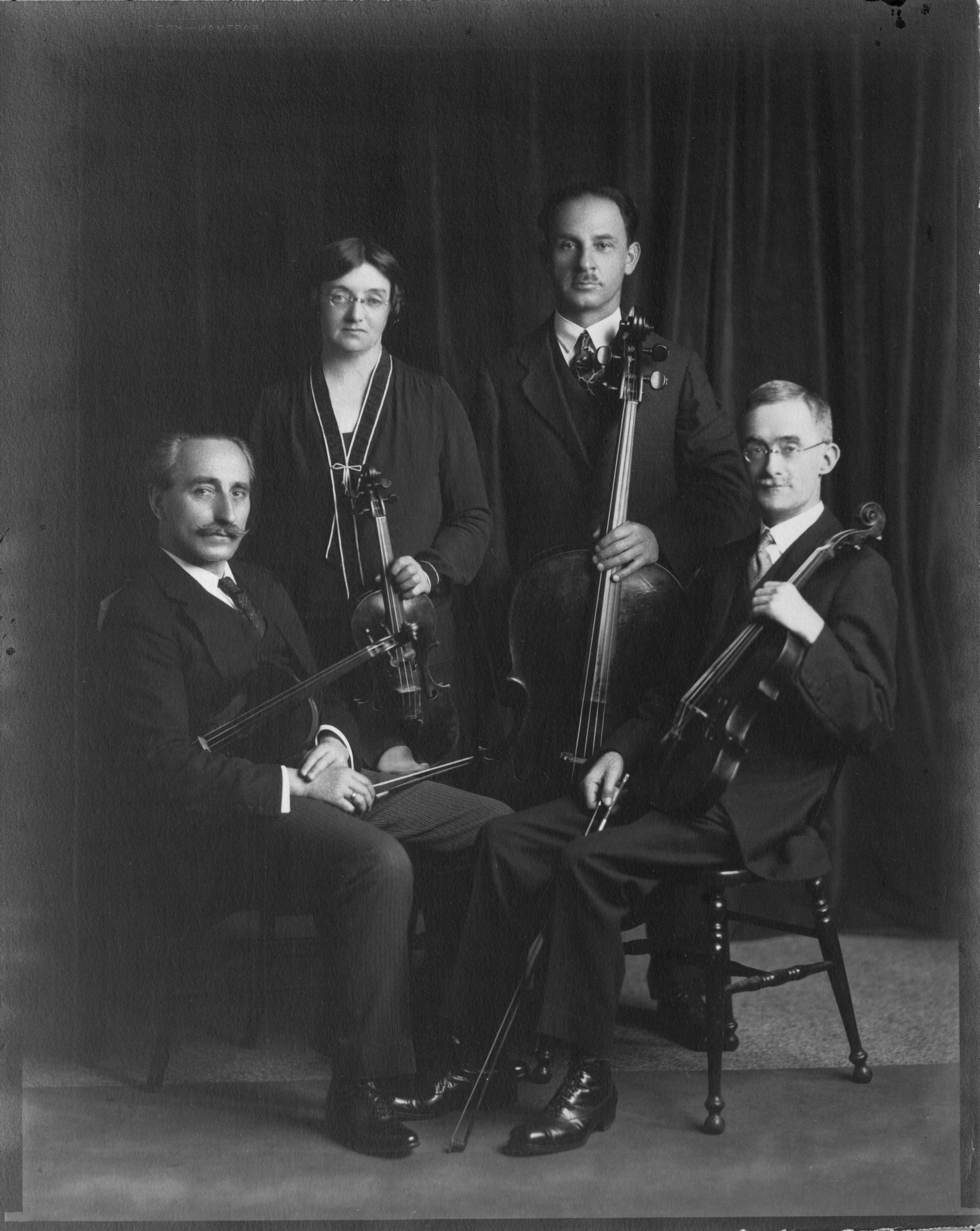
Verbrugghen String Quartet

Verbrugghen String Quartet was a string quartet founded by Henri Verbrugghen.

In 1903 Verbrugghen founded in Scotland a string quartet. When in 1916 he went to Australia, he took its members with him. All of them were engaged as professors at the New South Wales Conservatorium. They gave numerous chamber music concerts in Sydney, with introductory talks by Verbrugghen. Alfred Hill's String Quartet No. 4 (1916) is dedicated to this ensemble and its members.

The other members of the string quartet joined Verbrugghen also to Minneapolis.

== Members ==
- Henri Verbrugghen (first violin)
- Jenny Cullen (second violin, from ca.1908)
- David Nichols (viola)
- Paul Lemay (viola, late years)
- James Messeas (cello)
- Engelbert Roentgen (cello, late years)
