= Gustav Schreck =

German composer, music educator, and choirmaster (1849–1918)

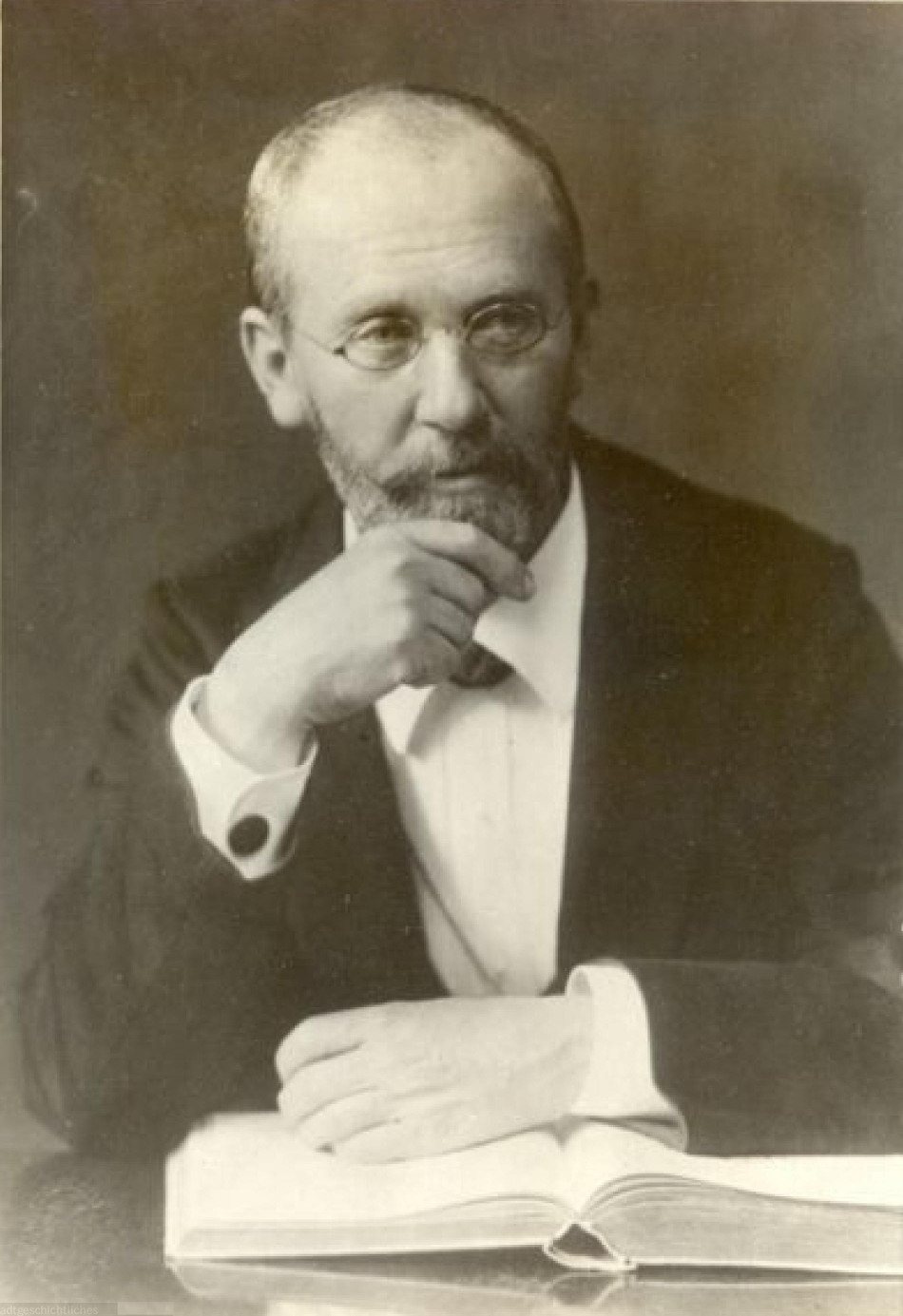
Gustav Schreck, c. 1900

Gustav Ernst Schreck (born 8 September 1849 in Zeulenroda; died 22 January 1918 in Leipzig) was a German music teacher, composer and choirmaster of St. Thomas School, Thomasschule zu Leipzig, in Leipzig from 1893 to 1918.

== Life ==
Schreck was born in 1849, the son of a hosier, which was at that time a usual profession in the region of Vogtland where his family lived. The children were required to actively contribute to the maintenance of the family household. The monotonous activity was interspersed with singing while performing works in the Schreck home. The musical abilities of the young Gustav were encouraged by early piano lessons. From 1863 to 1867 he attended the teacher training college in Greiz and was a member of the student choir. Upon completion of training, he worked temporarily as a village schoolmaster in Gommla and Remptendorf, Germany. In 1868 he moved to Leipzig to study music and other subjects at the Conservatory in that city with the Thomas cantor Ernst Friedrich Richter. In 1870, the 21-year old joined his brother in Vyborg, Finland, where he taught music at the German School for four years. He returned to Leipzig in 1874 and took up work as a freelance composer and musician. Soon thereafter he married the poet Emmy Krohn.

He composed chamber music and individual choral pieces. During this time, two oratorios emerged: King Fjalar (to an original text by Johan Ludvig Runeberg) and Christ, the Risen One, to a text written by his wife. The first performances in the Gewandhaus were extremely well received. In 1887 he was asked to take on a position as a teacher of music theory and composition at the Conservatory founded by Felix Mendelssohn, where he remained as a teacher until his retirement in 1917.

In May 1892, the Thomaskantor Wilhelm Rust died, and Schreck was appointed as his successor the following year. He was aware of the responsibility that this "most eminient cantor's position in the world" brought with it. With great diligence, he brought his teaching skills, his great theoretical knowledge and his knowledge of the Leipzig music scene to the task.

The working conditions at St. Thomas were exemplary after the move into a new school building (1877). The schoolmaster was Franz Emil Jungmann, an educated and open-minded music enthusiast.

The musical activities in the St. Thomas and St. Nicholas churches strengthened under Schreck with works by Johann Sebastian Bach being performed along with those of other former Thomas cantors. Gustav Schreck started a series of choir books, and on the occasion of the 700th anniversary of the St. Thomas School in 1912, a concert with compositions exclusively by Thomas cantors ranging back to Georg Rhau was given. The choir took on more ambitious task, participating in the performance of choral symphonic works at the Gewandhaus, and its New Year's concerts became an annual highlight of the Gewandhaus season.

The artistic quality of the performances under Schreck rose – his work was recognized, among other things, by the title of professor (1898) and by an honorary doctorate awarded in 1909 by Leipzig University. Gustav Schreck dedicated the motet The Lord is my shepherd to Rector Jungmann's 25th work anniversary (1906). The festival cantatas to celebrate the 500-year anniversary of the University (1909) and the 700-year anniversary of the Schola Thomana are commissions that bear witness to the appreciation of Schreck as a composer. The texts of the cantatas were written by his wife, who also painted portraits of former Thomas cantors that can still be viewed today in the rehearsal hall of the Thomasalumnat.

As Thomaskantor, Schreck was not satisfied with the replacement of historical instruments by modern ones, he led the acquisition or the replica of oboe d'amore, Clarin trumpets and other instruments of the Bach Orchestra. He did not shy from performing the cantatas in their entirety and continued the practice of his predecessor and Bach researcher Rust to give the soprano and alto solo parts to members of the Thomas Choir.

In 1900, Gustav Schreck became one of the founding members of the New Bach Society. The Bach festivals of this society have been held with the regular participation of St. Thomas to this day.

In 1887, Schreck became teacher of composition and music theory at the Leipzig Conservatory. Notable students of Schreck during this time include F. Melius Christiansen and Anna Diller Starbuck. From 1901, he served as the secretary of the New Bach Society. In 1909 he wrote a cantata to celebrate the 500-year anniversary of the University. In appearance, he also appeared as an arranger of folksongs for 1906 published Volksliederbuch for male chorus ("Emperor Songbook").

Under Schreck's direction, the St. Thomas Boys Choir was no longer heard only in the St. Thomas St. Nicholas Churches in Leipzig, but increasingly also in concerts in the Leipzig Gewandhaus. His compositions are characterized by a prevailing contrapuntal technique and singable vocal lines. He largely avoided the influence of Wagner and later Reger.

He was Knight 1st Class of the Albert Order. ^{[1]}

On January 22, 1918 Prof. Dr. Gustav Ernst Schreck died in Leipzig at the age of 68. He is buried at the Südfriedhof cemetery in Leipzig. His grave has been preserved to this day and can still be visited. An inscription on the stone reads: May the eternal light illuminate you.

== Works ==
=== Oratorios ===
- King Fjalar
- Christ, the Risen One

=== Other church music ===
- Psalm 13, Lord, O Lord, how long! (Psalm 13)
  1. Lament. How long, O Lord? Will you forget me forever?
  2. Appeal. Give light to my eyes
  3. Confidence. But I trusted
- Psalm 23, The Lord is my shepherd for alto solo and seven voice choir (Psalm 23)
- Lord have mercy on me. To words from Psalm 25 for solo voices and four-part choir
- Turn us, God of our salvation (Psalm 85, verses 5-8) for solo quartet and four-part choir
- How should I receive you. Advent motet
- God with us. In the name of God we go for four to five-part choir
- The day decreases. For seven-part choir

=== Chamber music ===
- Sonata, Op. 9 for bassoon and piano (IMSLP)
- Sonata, Op. 13 for oboe and piano (IMSLP)

== Literature ==
- Ulrich Room (ed.): Gustav Schreck: Song motets and psalms. Chor archive. Music of Thomas Cantor in Leipzig. Bärenreiter, Kassel 1993 BA6941.
- Martin Petzoldt (ed.): St. Thomas in Leipzig. Protestant publishing house, Leipzig 2000, ISBN 3-374-01842-4.

== Documents ==
Letters of Gustav Schreck are held by the Leipzig music publisher CF Peters in Staatsarchiv Leipzig.

== See also ==
- List of German classical composers
