= W. Arundel Orchard =

W. Arundel Orchard OBE FRCM
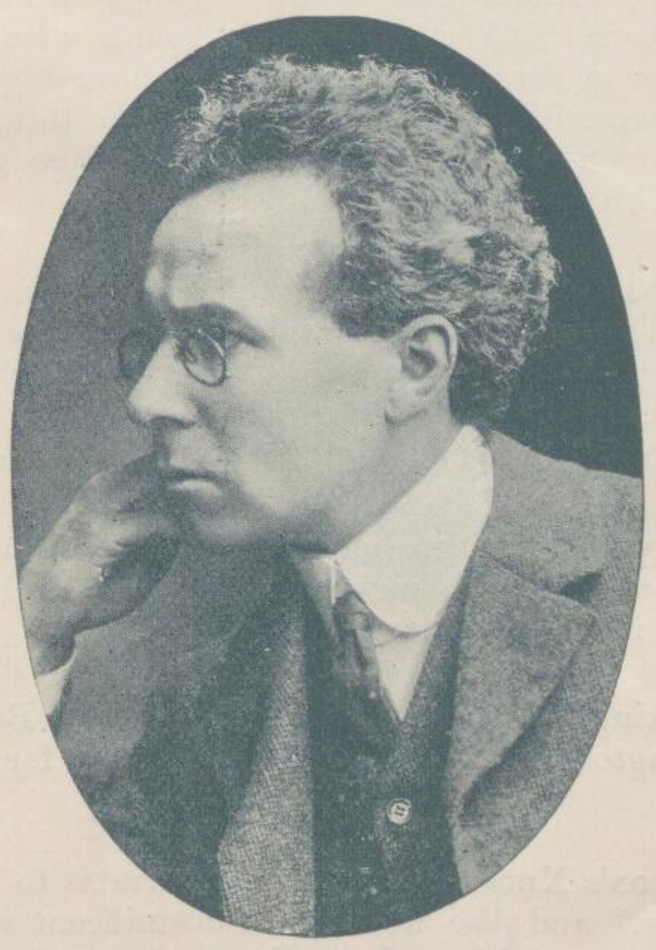
- In Australia in 1906
- Born: William Arundel Orchard; 13 April 1867; London, England
- Died: 7 April 1961 (aged 93); Dominion Monarch, at sea
- Occupations: Organist, pianist, composer, conductor, music educator
- Musical career
- Genres: Classical
- Instruments: Pipe organ, piano
- Formerly of: Sydney Symphony Orchestra

William Arundel Orchard OBE FRCM (13 April 1867 – 7 April 1961) was a British-born Australian organist, pianist, composer, conductor and music educator.

Orchard was born in London and educated privately. He attended the University of Durham, graduating Bachelor of Music (BMus) in 1893. In 1896 he left England for Perth, Western Australia, to take up a position as a choir director. He later worked in Hobart and New Zealand, before settling in Sydney in 1903. He was the founding conductor of the Sydney Symphony Orchestra in 1908 and also conducted the Sydney Madrigal and Chamber Music Society from 1908 to 1915.

In 1916, Orchard began teaching at the New South Wales State Conservatorium of Music, taking over as Director in 1923. The University of Durham made him Doctor of Music (DMus) in 1928. He retired from the Conservatorium in 1934, but in 1935 established the first music degree course at the University of Tasmania, teaching it until 1938. In 1938, he founded the Musical Association of Tasmania, becoming its first President.

Returning to Sydney, he became the Visiting Examiner for the Trinity College of Music, and constantly travelled around Australia for the next 20 years.

Orchard was returning from a trip to England, when he died on board the Dominion Monarch. He was buried at sea, off Cape Town, South Africa.

== Works ==
His most successful stage work, The Coquette: or, A Suicidal Policy (1905), was a light opera in the style of Gilbert and Sullivan; it tells the story of a suicide club. It was written by W. J. Curtis and J. I. Hunt and published in 1905. He also composed The Emporer, a comic opera first staged in 1906.

His only serious opera was Dorian Gray, a setting of Oscar Wilde's novel The Picture of Dorian Gray. It had its premiere at the New South Wales State Conservatorium on 11 September 1919, but was not published.

He also wrote a violin concerto; a dramatic poem for soprano, baritone, men's chorus and orchestra; chamber music; and various songs.

Orchard published his autobiography The Distant View (1943) and Music in Australia (1952).

== Honours ==
He was elected a Fellow of the Royal College of Music (FRCM) in 1931. In 1936, he was appointed an Officer of the Order of the British Empire (OBE).
