= String Quartet No. 1 (Hill) =

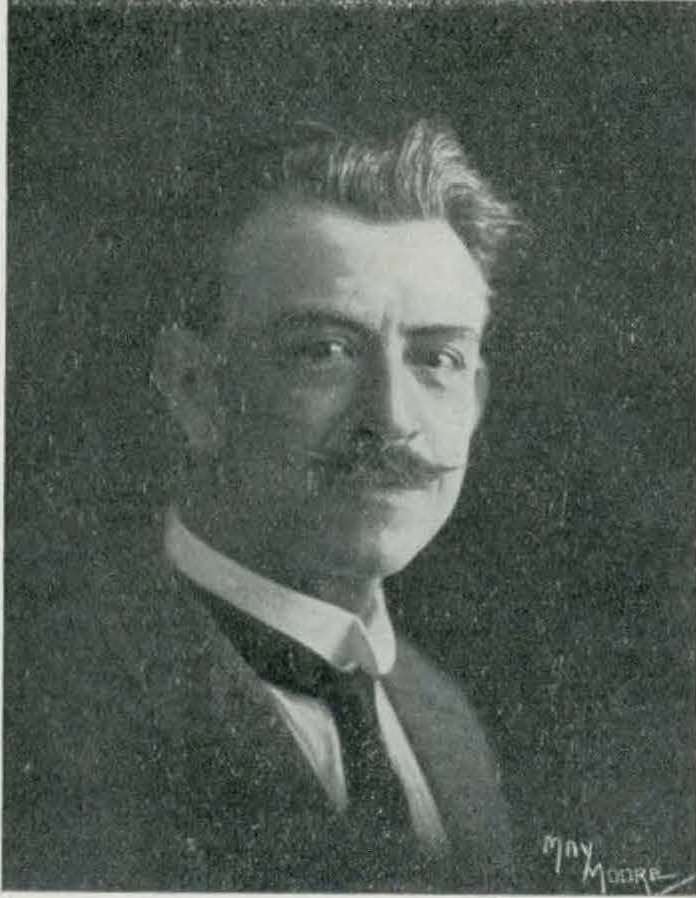
Alfred Hill

String Quartet No. 1 in B♭ major "Maori Quartet", Stiles 1.2.3.3 SQ1 is the first of Alfred Hill's seventeen string quartets. Its composition began before 1892, it was completed after 1896 and premiered only on 18 May 1911 in Sydney.

The first two quartets were published together by Breitkopf & Härtel in 1913 (no full score, only parts). Each of them used to be referred as Maori, a feature that can lead to confusions. Today the first one is called Maori, while for the second another (longer) subtitle is retained. Its approximate duration is 22 minutes.

== History ==
Hill began composing this quartet while he was studying in Leipzig Conservatory (between 1887 and 1891), but the two middle movements (Adagio and Scherzo) were later (after 1896) substituted with new music incorporating Māori ideas. The second theme of the Finale is actually the same Māori tune that was used as a principal (love) theme in Hill's 1896 cantata Hinemoa (though its origin is not indicated in the quartet score). The 1896 as terminus post quem for this quartet is also based on the composition of Hinemoa: it was by its success that Hill became fond of incorporating Māori tunes into his music.

Even in its final form this quartet remains clearly European in style. The original scherzo was used by Hill in his First Symphony (by 1898) and in the Fourth Quartet.

== Structure ==
The Quartet is in four movements:

1. Moderato – Allegro
2. Waiata (Songs accompanying the Dance). Haka Dance (Barbaric) – Trio. Poi Dance (Graceful) – Da capo
3. Tangi (Lament). Lento – Con moto – Tempo I – Allegro
4. Finale. Allegro moderato

The first movement is a sonata form. Its first subject (in B♭ major) consists of two parts: a slow (moderato) and a fast (allegro), both played twice. They reappear in the development section and in the reprise. The second theme (cantabile) is in F major. At the end of the movement it is repeated in B♭ major. Both the exposition and the reprise close with a new statement of the initial slow theme.

The Waiata is a scherzo with a trio. Both themes are Māori: a barbaric Haka Dance and a graceful Poi Dance. The main section is in F major, while the trio is in D major.

The Tangi is also based on a Māori. It is a sorrowful melody in G minor with a contrasting middle section in fast tempo (con moto). This movement ends with a brief coda.

Just like the opening movement, the finale is laid out in a sonata form (in B♭ major) with a second subject first stated in F major. It is the longest movement of the quartet and its coda (animato) provides a splendid conclusion for the whole piece.

== Editions ==
- Alfred Hill. String Quartet No.1 in Bb. Narara, N.S.W.: Stiles Music Publications, 2002 (ISMN 979-0-720029-61-0) — full score and parts

== Recordings ==
- (rec. 2006) Dominion String Quartet – (2007) Naxos Records 8.570491.
