= Henry Krips (conductor) =

Austrian-Australian conductor and composer

Henry Maria Krips, MBE (10 February 1912 – 25 January 1987) was an Austrian-Australian conductor and composer, best known for his 23-year record term (1949–1972) as principal conductor of the South Australian Symphony Orchestra (it had been founded in 1936 as the Adelaide Symphony Orchestra and reverted to that name in 1975). He is credited with introducing the works of Gustav Mahler to Australian audiences.

== Life and career ==
Henry Krips was born in Vienna in 1912 as Heinrich Josef Krips; his brother was the conductor Josef Krips. His father was a Jewish-born convert to Catholicism, and his mother was from a Catholic family. He studied at the Vienna Conservatory, and made his début in 1932 at the Burgtheater there. After the 1938 Anschluss, as his brother Josef left Vienna for Belgrade, Heinrich Krips emigrated to Australia. He formed the Krips-de Vries Opera Company there, and also served as musical director for the Kirsova Ballet in Sydney in 1941. He was naturalised in 1944 and changed his first name to Henry.

From 1947 Krips worked for the Australian Broadcasting Corporation. He was the main conductor of the West Australian Symphony Orchestra (Perth) from 1948 to 1972, and the principal conductor of the then-named South Australian Symphony Orchestra (Adelaide) from 1949 to 1972. For more than 20 years he played a leading part in Australian and New Zealand musical life. In 1955 Alfred Hill dedicated to Krips his Symphony No. 4.

Henry Krips was also active as a composer. He wrote the score for the 1949 film Sons of Matthew. In 1951 there was a competition for a new national anthem to celebrate the golden jubilee of the Federation of Australia. Krips's entry This Land of Mine won the competition, but was not taken up as the national anthem. His other compositions include opera, ballets, numerous songs and instrumental pieces, including music for the ABC animated cartoon, Waltzing Matilda.

In 1970 he was appointed a Member of the Order of the British Empire (MBE).

In 1972 he moved to London, where he had appeared as a guest conductor with the Sadler's Wells Opera from 1967, and conducted occasional concerts. His performances of Johann Strauss and Franz Lehár were particularly admired.

Henry Krips died in Adelaide in 1987.

His grandson, Henry Wagons, is an Australian singer/songwriter, musician, radio and TV personality and frontman of the popular outlaw country rock band Wagons.

== Works ==
- Blue Mountains
- Legend

=== Songs ===
- 1951 Land of Mine

=== Instrumental and orchestral ===
- 1956 Southern intermezzo (saxophone with piano)
- 1957 The revolution of the umbrellas (orchestral music)
- 1959 Kirribilli (orchestral)
- Romanze
- Serenata piccola

=== Ballet ===
- Faust (1941)
- The revolution of the umbrellas (1941)

=== Film scores ===
- Gone to the Dogs (1939)
- Come up Smiling (1939)
- Dad Rudd, M.P. (1940)
- The Power and the Glory (1941)
- Smithy (1946)
- Sons of Matthew (1949)
