= Cyril Monk =

Australian violinist (1882–1970)

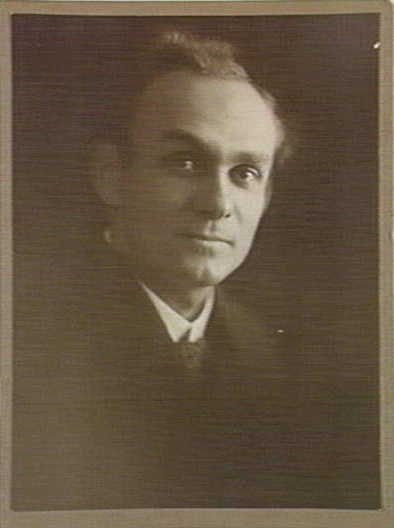
Cyril Monk

Cyril Farnsworth Monk (9 March 1882 – 7 March 1970) was an Australian violinist and academic. His wife was the pianist and composer Varney Monk.

== Life ==
Monk was born in Surry Hills, Sydney in 1882, son of James Monk, a grocer, and wife Rosa née Bullen. He began playing the piano aged four, taught by his mother; from age nine he studied the violin with Samuel Chudleigh, secretary of the London College of Music. Later he studied the violin more intensively with Josef Kretschmann (who had been a pupil of Karol Lipiński and Ferdinand David), and music theory and composition with Alfred Hill.

In September 1904 he went to London and studied with Guido Papini at the College of Violinists. During his time in Europe, he heard many notable violinists of the day and had transcriptions and compositions published. In 1906 he passed the college's exams with distinction and received a gold medal.

Monk returned to Australia, and was engaged by Alfred Hill as a soloist with the orchestral concerts at the International Exhibition of 1906 in Christchurch, New Zealand. During the next year, he toured New Zealand with the orchestra.

In 1910 he formed the Austral String Quartet in Sydney, Alfred Hill sometimes being a member; the quartet introduced recent works to Australia.

On 22 December 1913, in Sydney, Monk married Isabel Varney Desmond Peterson (1892–1967), a pianist and composer known professionally as Varney Monk.

In 1916 the New South Wales State Conservatorium of Music was founded in Sydney, and Monk was appointed a member of staff. He was leader the orchestra there, known as the New South Wales State Orchestra (the first full-time orchestra in Australia). He was an examiner for the Australian Music Examinations Board, and published educational compositions and arrangements for the violin. The Austral String Quartet was disbanded when Henri Verbrugghen, director of the Conservatorium, formed a quartet; Monk continued to give annual recitals. The last recital was in 1927. He was known for his interest in promoting recent music from Europe, and Australian compositions.

Monk retired from the Conservatorium in 1955. He died in Sydney on 7 March 1970, survived by a son and daughter.
