= Alfred Hill (composer) =

Australian composer and conductor

Alfred Hill CMG OBE
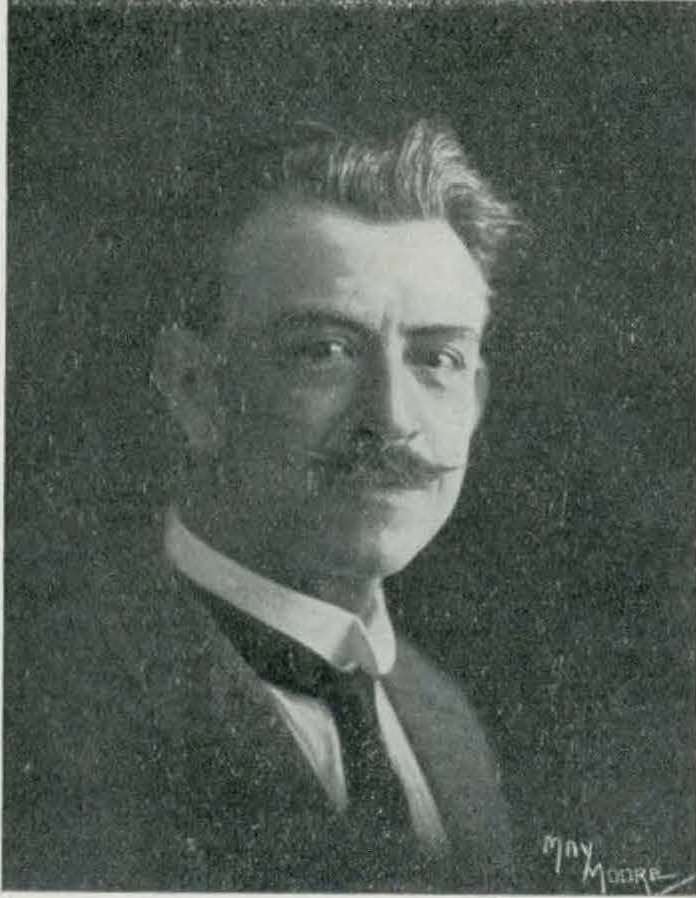
- Born: 16 December 1869; Melbourne, Australia
- Died: 30 October 1960 (aged 90)
- Known for: Music composition

Alfred Francis Hill CMG OBE (16 December 1869 – 30 October 1960) was an Australian-New Zealand composer, conductor and teacher.

== Life and work ==
Alfred Hill was born in Melbourne in 1869. His year of birth is shown in many sources as 1870, but this has now been disproven. He spent most of his early life in Wellington before moving to Germany, where he studied at the Leipzig Conservatory between 1887 and 1891 under Gustav Schreck, Hans Sitt and Oscar Paul. Later he played second violin with the Gewandhaus Orchestra, under guest conductors including Brahms, Grieg, Tchaikovsky, Bruch, and Reinecke. While there, some of his compositions were played with fellow students, and several were published in Germany. These included the Scotch Sonata for violin and piano.

Hill returned to New Zealand, where was appointed director of the Wellington Orchestral Society. He also worked as a violin teacher, recitalist, chamber musician, and choral conductor. He was active in the push for a New Zealand Conservatorium of Music, and for the foundation of an institute of Māori studies at Rotorua. During this period he completed his first string quartet, on Māori themes, which later would achieve some familiarity in the United States through regular programming by the Zoellner Quartet in the period surrounding World War I.

In 1897 Hill returned to Australia, where he taught for a number of years. He married his first wife, Sarah Brownhill Booth, a New Zealander, on 6 October 1897 in Paddington, New South Wales. They were to have three children, who were given the Wagnerian names Isolde, Tristan and Elsa. In 1921 he divorced his wife, and on 1 October of that year married his former student Mirrie Solomon, also a composer. Alfred Hill's daughter Isolde Hill became a noted opera singer, and granddaughter Patricia Hill, a noted actress.

On 1 January 1901 he conducted a choir of 10,000 voices and ten massed brass bands as part of the celebrations of the Federation of Australia in Sydney. After several years regularly travelling between Australia and New Zealand, Hill settled in Sydney in 1911, becoming the principal of the Austral Orchestral College, and the 2nd violin player of the Austral String Quartet. In 1913 Hill founded the Australian Opera League with Fritz Hart, as part of an attempt to create an Australian operatic tradition. Hill was also a founder of the Sydney Repertory Theatre Society, and a foundation council member (later president) of the Musical Association of New South Wales.

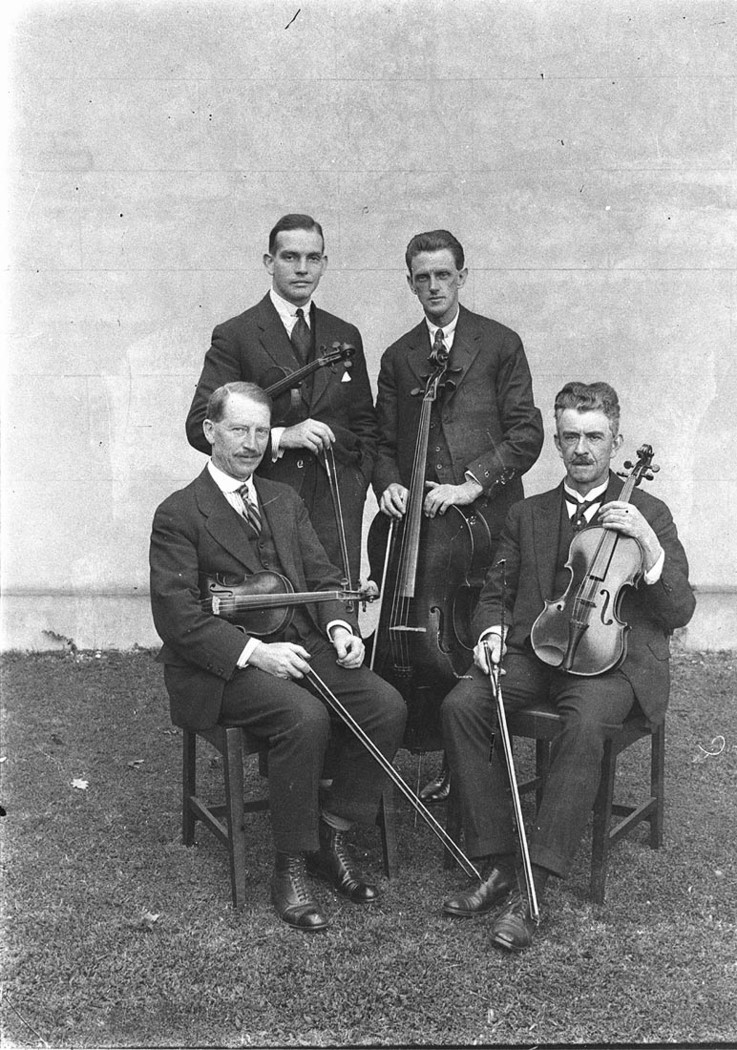
Alfred Hill (right, seated) with other members of the New South Wales State Conservatorium Quartet (Gerald Walenn, Lionel Lawson and Gladstone Bell) (Photo taken after 1924.)

Hill was also active as an organizer of music in Australia. In 1915–16 he co-founded the NSW State Conservatorium of Music and became its first Professor of Theory and Composition, and later deputy conductor to Henri Verbrugghen. When the Australian Broadcasting Commission was formed in 1932, Hill was member of the ABC's Music Advisory Committee. In 1947 he became president of the Composers' Society of Australia.

== Honours ==
Alfred Hill was made an Officer of the Order of the British Empire in 1953, and a Companion of the Order of St Michael and St George in 1960. In 1959, his 90th birthday was celebrated by a special concert of his music played by the Sydney Symphony Orchestra under Henry Krips. Alfred Hill died at the age of 90 in 1960. He was survived by his second wife Mirrie Hill, and the three children of his first marriage. Isolde Hill became well known as a singer.

== Compositions and reputation ==
Hill composed and conducted music for the Hugh McCrae play The Ship of Heaven, which was produced by the Independent Theatre in 1933. From 1937 onwards, he devoted himself full-time to composition. He wrote more than 500 compositions, including 13 symphonies (of which 11 are arrangements of previously written string quartets), eight operas (including The Weird Flute), numerous concertos, a mass, 17 string quartets and other chamber works, two cantatas on Māori subjects (Hinemoa and Tawhaki) and 11 other choral works, and 72 piano pieces. One of his string quartets (No.11 in D minor), from 1945, was the very first Australian composed chamber work to be recorded.

Hill wrote a whole opera for the 1938 film The Broken Melody.

While mostly neglected nowadays, he is still very well known on both sides of the Tasman for a short song "Waiata Poi", which was recorded by many singers including Peter Dawson. Since the 1990s, however, there has been renewed interest in Hill's oeuvre. His short piece for narrator and orchestra, Green Water, with words by John Wheeler, has been recorded at least twice. The Marco Polo label recorded most of his symphonies, which were played by the Queensland Symphony Orchestra.

== List of works (selection) ==
- Thirteen symphonies:
  - No. 1 in B♭ major, "Maori" (1901), unfinished
  - No. 2, in E♭ major, "Joy of Life" (1941)
  - No. 3 in B minor, "Australia"
  - No. 4 in C minor, "The Pursuit of Happiness" (arranged from String Quartets Nos. 4 and 17)
  - No. 5 in A minor, "Carnival"
  - No. 6 in Bb major, "Celtic"
  - No. 7 in E minor
  - No. 8 in A major, "The Mind of Man", for string orchestra
  - No. 9 in E major, "Melodious", for string orchestra
  - No. 10 in C major, "Short Symphony"
  - No. 11 in E♭ major, "The Four Nations", for string orchestra (arranged from String Quartet No. 5)
  - No. 12 in E♭ major
  - No. 13 in A minor, for string orchestra
- Orchestral music, including:
  - Linthorpe
  - The Lost Hunter, Tone poem (1945)
  - The Sea, Tone poem for orchestra and voices (1941)
  - The Sacred Mountain
  - White Flame
- Concertos
  - Piano Concerto in A major
  - Violin Concerto in E minor (1932)
  - Viola Concerto (1940)
  - French horn Concerto in D minor (1947)
  - Trumpet Concerto (1915)
- Seventeen String quartets, including:
  - String Quartet No. 1 in B♭, "Maori" (c. 1896; published 1913)
  - String Quartet No.2 in G minor, "A Maori Legend in 4 Scenes"
  - String Quartet No.3 in A minor, "The Carnival"
  - String Quartet No. 4 in C minor
  - String Quartet No. 5 in E♭ major, "The Allies" (1920)
  - String Quartet No. 6 in G major, "The Kids"
  - String Quartet No. 7 in A major (1934)
  - String Quartet No. 8 in A major (1934)
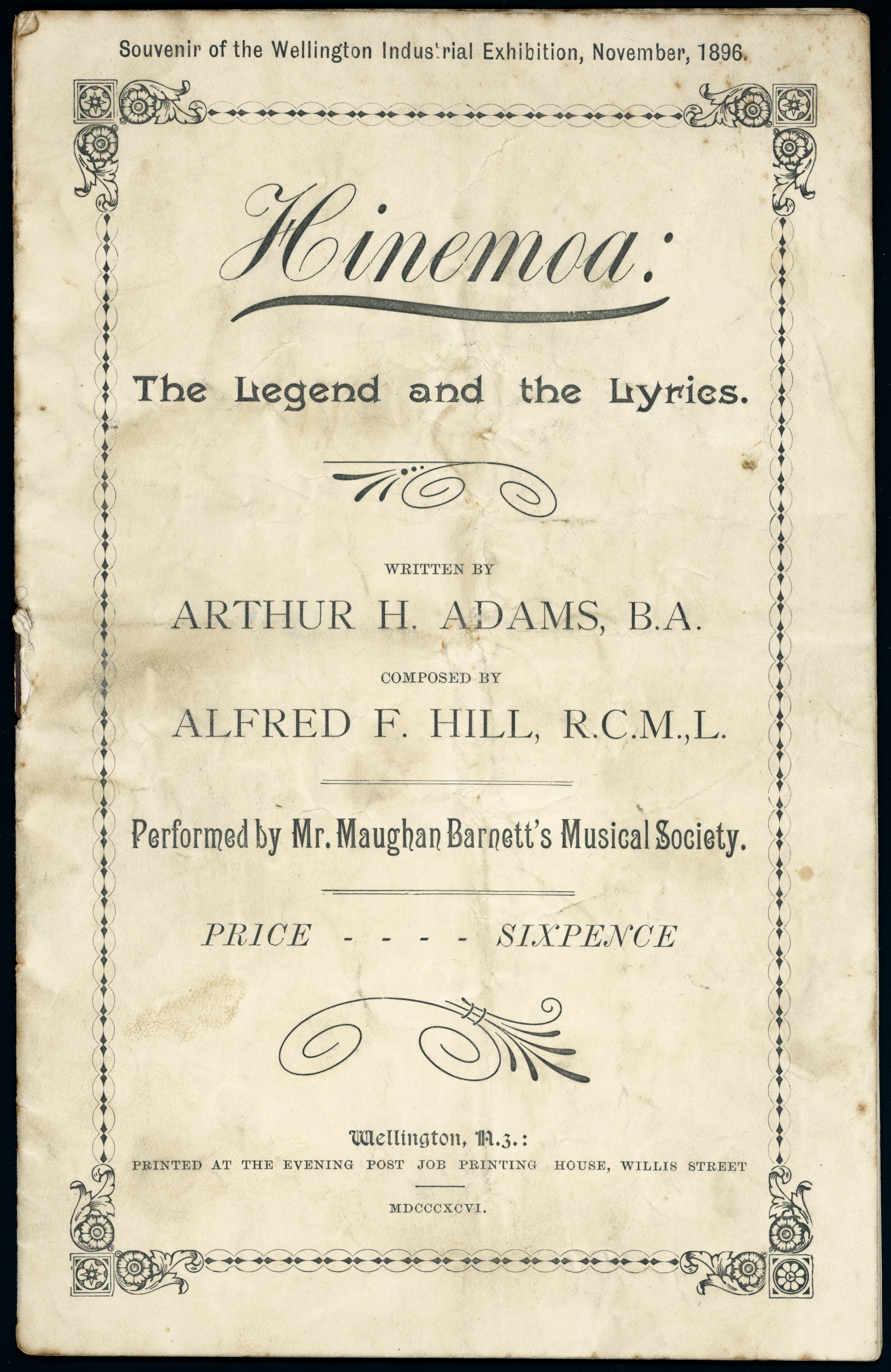
    Cover of a booklet containing the words of the musical work "Hinemoa", 18 November 1896
- Eight operas:
  - The Whipping Boy (1893)
  - Lady Dolly (1900)
  - Tapu (1913)
  - Teora (1913)
  - Giovanni (1914)
  - The Rajah of Shivapore (1917)
  - Auster (1922)
  - The Ship of Heaven (1923)
- Eleven pieces for choir, including:
  - Hinemoa, cantata (1896)
  - Mass in E♭ major for mixed chorus and organ (1931)
  - Make a joyful noise unto the Lord (Psalm 100) for male chorus and piano or organ (1934)
  - The 3 great pillars for male voices and piano or organ (1934)
- 72 Pieces for piano
- Other compositions:
  - Piano Trio in A minor
  - Violin Sonata No. 2 in A minor
  - Violin Sonata No. 3 in A minor
  - Violin Sonata No. 4 in C minor

== Discography (partial) ==
- String Quartets Nos. 5, 6 and 11 (Australian String Quartet) : Marco Polo 8.223746
- String Quartets, Vol. 1 (Dominion String Quartet) – Nos. 1, 2, 3 : Naxos 8.570491
- String Quartets, Vol. 2 (Dominion String Quartet) – Nos. 4, 6, 8 : Naxos 8.572097
- String Quartets, Vol. 3 (Dominion String Quartet) – Nos. 5, 7, 9 : Naxos 8.572446
- String Quartets, Vol. 4 (Dominion String Quartet) – Nos. 10 and 11, Life Quintet : Naxos 8.572844
- String Quartets, Vol. 5 (Dominion String Quartet) – Nos. 12, 13, 14 : Naxos 8.573267
- Symphony No. 2 "Joy of Life" (Adelaide Symphony Orchestra, Adelaide Singers, Patrick Thomas): ABC Classic FM recording
- Symphony Nos 3 and 7, The Lost Hunter, The Moon's Golden Horn (Queensland Symphony Orchestra, Wilfred Lehmann) : Marco Polo 8.223537
- Symphony Nos 4 and 6, The Sacred Mountain (Melbourne Symphony Orchestra, Wilfred Lehmann) : Marco Polo 8.220345
- Symphony Nos 5 and 10, As Night Falls, Tribute to a Musician (Queensland Symphony Orchestra, Wilfred Lehmann) : Marco Polo 8.223538
- Green Water (Peter Munro, narrator; Queensland Symphony Orchestra, John Farnsworth Hall) (1954; ABC recording)

== Resources ==
Listen to Alfred Hill's The Moon's Golden Horn online at ABC Classic FM's classic/amp website.

== Sources ==
- McCredie, A. D. 1978. "Alfred Hill". In Australian Composition in the Twentieth Century, ed. Frank Callaway and David Tunley, 7–18. Melbourne and New York: Oxford University Press. ISBN 0-19-550522-0
- Andrew D. McCredie, "Hill, Alfred Francis (1869–1960)", Australian Dictionary of Biography, National Centre of Biography, Australian National University, https://adb.anu.edu.au/biography/hill-alfred-francis-6667/text11495, published first in hardcopy 1983, accessed online 9 November 2022.
- Thomson, John M. (1970). "The Role of the Pioneer Composer: some Reflections on Alfred Hill 1870–1960". Studies in Music [Australia]. 4: 52–61.
- Thomson, John M. (1980). A Distant Music: the Life and Times of Alfred Hill 1870–1960. Auckland: Oxford University Press Australia. ISBN 978-0-19-554347-6.
- Thomson, John M. (1980). "A Question of Authenticity: Alfred Hill, Ovide Musin, the Chevalier de Kontski and the Wellington Orchestral Society, 1892–1896". Turnbull Library Record. 13: 80–92.
- Thomson, J. M. 2001. "Hill, Alfred." In The New Grove Dictionary of Music and Musicians, ed. S. Sadie and J. Tyrrell. London: Macmillan.
