= Henri Verbrugghen =

Belgian musician

Henri Adrien Marie Verbrugghen
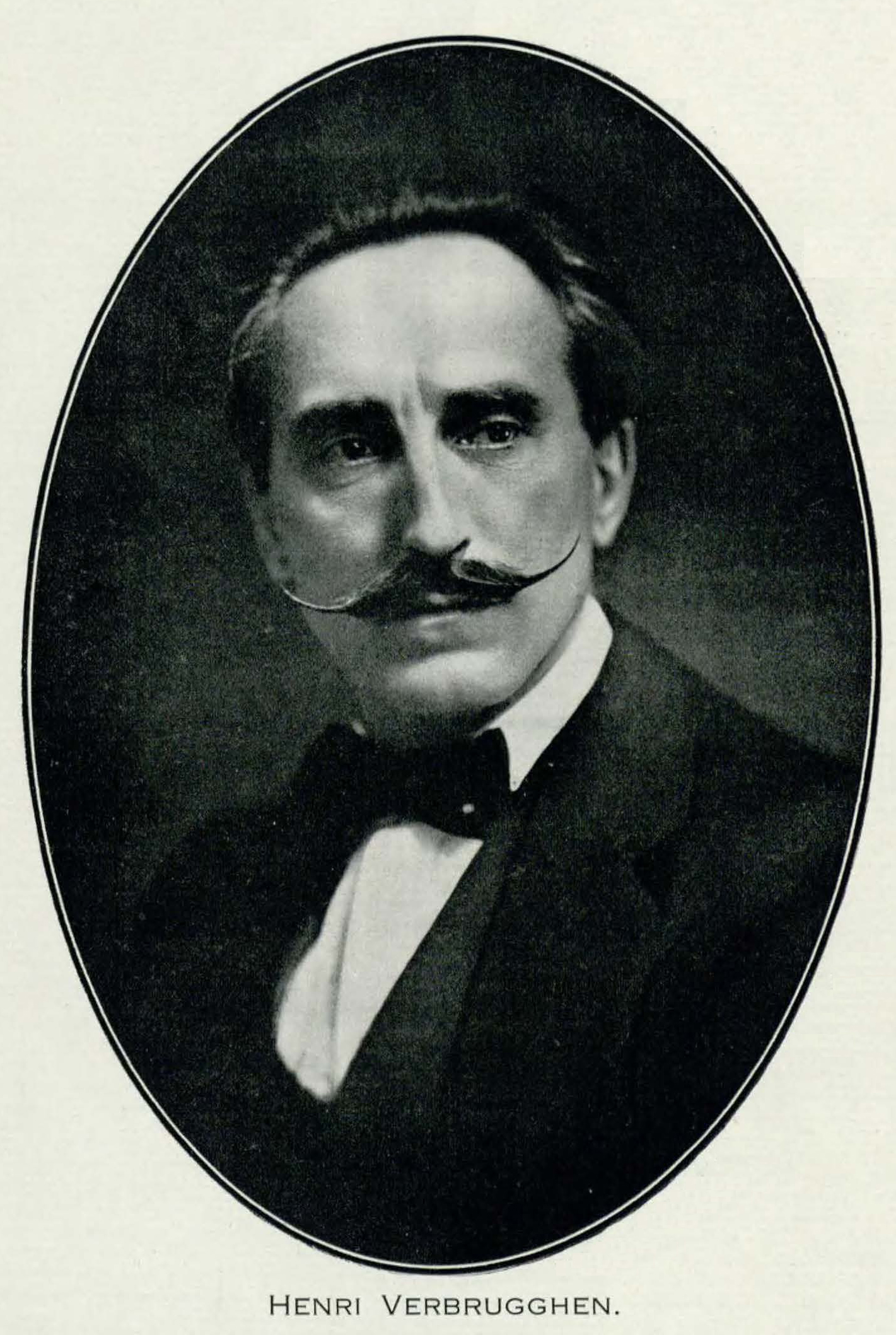
- Henri Verbrugghen ca.1920

Background information
- Born: 1 August 1873; Brussels, Belgium
- Died: 12 November 1934 (aged 61) Northwest, Minnesota, United States of American
- Education: Brussels Conservatoire
- Occupations: Musician, conductor
- Instrument: Violin

Henri Adrien Marie Verbrugghen (1 August 1873 – 12 November 1934) was a Belgian classical musician, who directed orchestras in England, Scotland, Australia and the United States.

Hwe was a violinist who worked with his own string quartet and was a conductor of the Royal Scottish National Orchestra

== Biography ==
Verbrugghen was born in Brussels, Belgian in 1873, to Henri Senior and Elsa nee Derode, and trained at the Brussels Conservatoire by Jenö Hubay

In 1907, he was the soloist in the first performance in England of the Violin Concerto in D minor by Jean Sibelius.

Verbrugghen was Chief of Staff at the Glasgow Athenaeum School of Music He is one of those featured in "Who's Who in Glasgow in 1909"

In 1927 he composed his Missa de Sancta Maria Magdalena for the choir of St Mary's Basilica in Minneapolis, which is still popular in various congregations in the Midwest which celebrate the Tridentine Latin Mass. In 1928, he was elected a national honorary member of Phi Mu Alpha Sinfonia fraternity, the American fraternity for men in music.

He died in November 1934 in Northwood, Minnesota, USA.

There is a Verbrugghen Street in the suburb of Melba in the Australian national capital, Canberra. All the streets in the suburb are named after significant figures in Australian music. Verbrugghen Hall at the Sydney Conservatorium of Music in Sydney also commemorates his name.
