= Fries familly (Mulhouse) =

Patrician familly from Alsace

Fries family
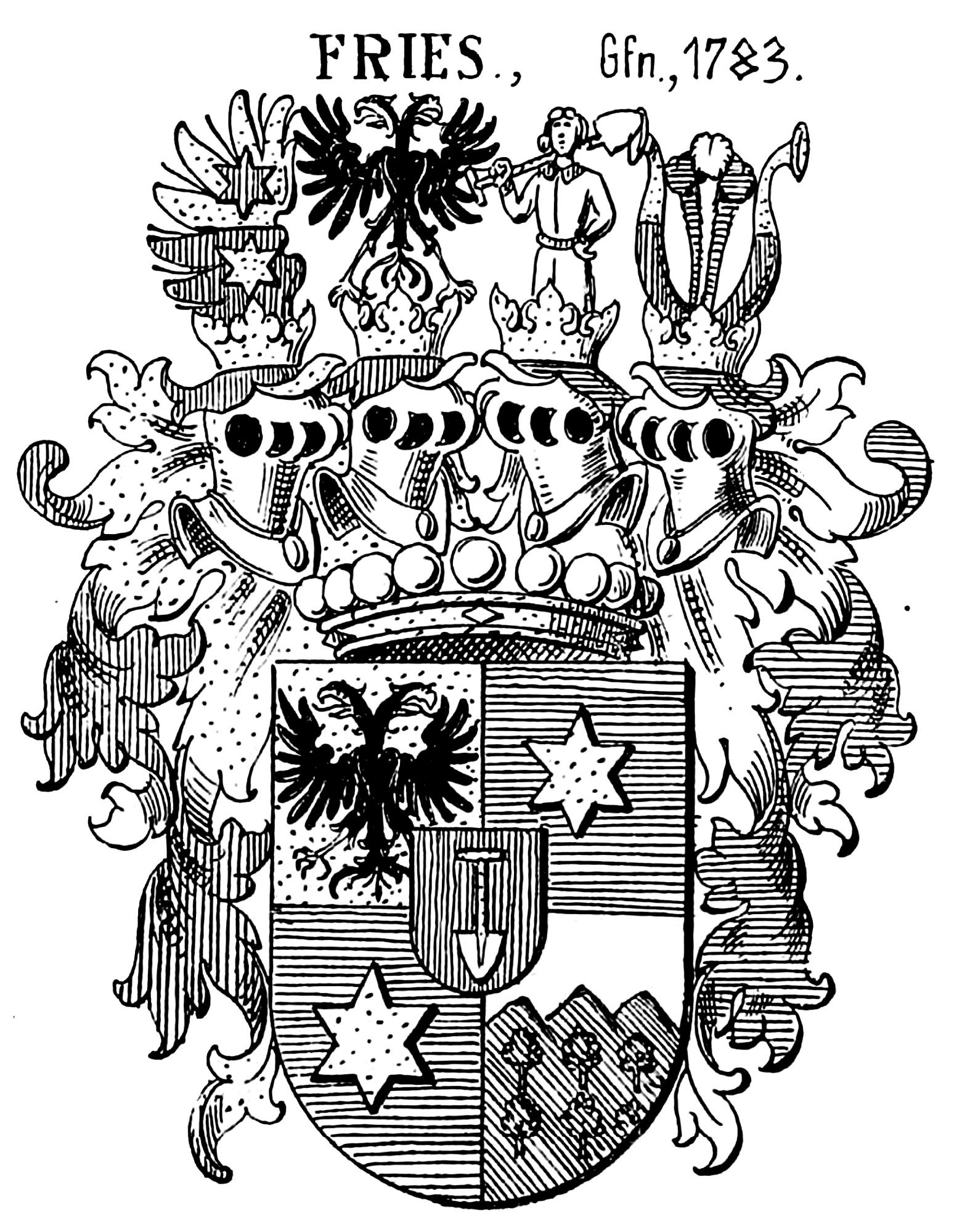
- Arms of the Austrian counts von Fries (1783)
- Origin: Switzerland
- Branches: Mulhouse branch Austrian branch

The Fries family is a family of Swiss origin established in Mulhouse, whose members have been active in trade, banking and the textile industry. It includes an Austrian branch elevated to the ranks of baron and count, as well as several lines based in Mulhouse.

== History ==
Jean-Jacques Fries, admitted to the burghership of Mulhouse in 1649, is the common ancestor of the branches outlined below. Some of his descendants settled in Austria in the eighteenth century, while others continued their activities in Alsace.

In his genealogical study, August von Fries links the family's origins to the Fries von Friesenberg, whom he describes as the lords of the castles of Friesenberg near Bern and Zurich.

=== Municipal government in Mulhouse, fifteenth to seventeenth centuries ===
The Fries belonged to the patriciate of Mulhouse from the late Middle Ages. Rudolph Fries, originally from Basel, is recorded in 1418. His descendants held offices as guild leaders, councillors and burgomasters. Valentin, or Veltin I, represented the town in negotiations for its alliance with Basel in 1506 and in those preceding its alliance with the thirteen Swiss cantons in 1515.

During the Renaissance, Valentin III Fries served as burgomaster from 1573 to 1578 and again from 1586 to 1587. His affair with Agnès Fininger, wife of the town clerk Daniel Wieland, caused a scandal and led to his removal from office in 1578. The family dispute contributed to the Fininger affair, a political and religious crisis that set part of the citizenry against the municipal government.

An uprising in 1587 led to the imprisonment of the magistrates; troops from the Protestant cantons restored them on 15 June. Valentin III died in prison in 1588. Members of the family were exiled and their property confiscated. His son Valentin IV, involved in another attempt to overthrow the government in 1590, took refuge in Austrian territory. The family returned to Mulhouse with Jean-Jacques Fries, admitted to its burghership in 1649.

=== Austrian branch ===
Johann von Fries (1719–1785) founded the bank Fries et Compagnie in Vienna with Johann Jakob Gontard in 1766. He also developed textile manufacturing in the Habsburg lands. Created a baron in 1762 and a count in 1783, he acquired Vöslau and commissioned the building now known as the Palais Pallavicini.

His son Moritz von Fries (1777–1826), an art collector and patron of Ludwig van Beethoven, was the dedicatee of Beethoven's Seventh Symphony. The bank went bankrupt in 1826. His grandson August von Fries (1841–1918), also known as Fries von Friesenberg, published a family genealogy in 1884.

A baronial branch descends from Philipp Jakob von Fries (1753–1822), Johann's nephew and a textile industrialist in Austria, who was created a baron in 1791.

=== Mulhouse branch ===
Members of the family participated in several textile businesses: Blech, Fries et Compagnie from 1796, Reber et Fries at Illzach in 1837, and subsequently Fries-Reber and Weiss-Fries et Compagnie at Kingersheim. The latter names represent successive stages of the same manufacturing business. The designer and painter Emmanuel Fries worked for Blech-Fries and married Barbe Schlumberger.

Émile Fries (1834–1914) was the first director of the Mulhouse weaving school, which opened in 1861. He subsequently directed the combined institution following the decision in 1868 to merge it with the spinning school.

During the First World War, Henri Fries, of Dollfus et Noack, served on the board of the Comptoir d'escompte de Mulhouse.

== Related families ==
Documented marriages include those of Emmanuel Fries to Barbe Schlumberger and Daniel Fries to Laurence Seydoux Fornier de Clausonne.

- Koechlin family
- Dollfus family
- Schlumberger family
- Seydoux family
- De Turckheim family

== Modern members ==
- Pierre Fries (1895–1965), a chemical engineer, directed the Viscose factory in Grenoble from 1932 to 1952 before taking responsibility for international affairs at the Comptoir des textiles artificiels. He was a Knight of the Legion of Honour (1957) and held the Croix de guerre and the Médaille militaire.
- Jean-Gérard Fries (1927–2012), a former director of domestic trade and senior member of the Court of Audit, was an Officer of the Legion of Honour (1987) and a Commander of the National Order of Merit (1980).
- Daniel Fries (1930–2022), a professor of medicine at Paris-Sud University and head of nephrology at Bicêtre Hospital, was a Knight of the Legion of Honour (1979) and an Officer of the National Order of Merit (1989).

The French branch also includes Christiane Scrivener, née Fries (1925–2024), Secretary of State for Consumer Affairs and later a European Commissioner; Fabrice Fries, chairman and chief executive of Agence France-Presse since 2018; and his brother Charles Fries, a diplomat and former ambassador to the Czech Republic, Morocco and Turkey. Christiane Scrivener was their paternal aunt.

== Heraldry and portraits ==
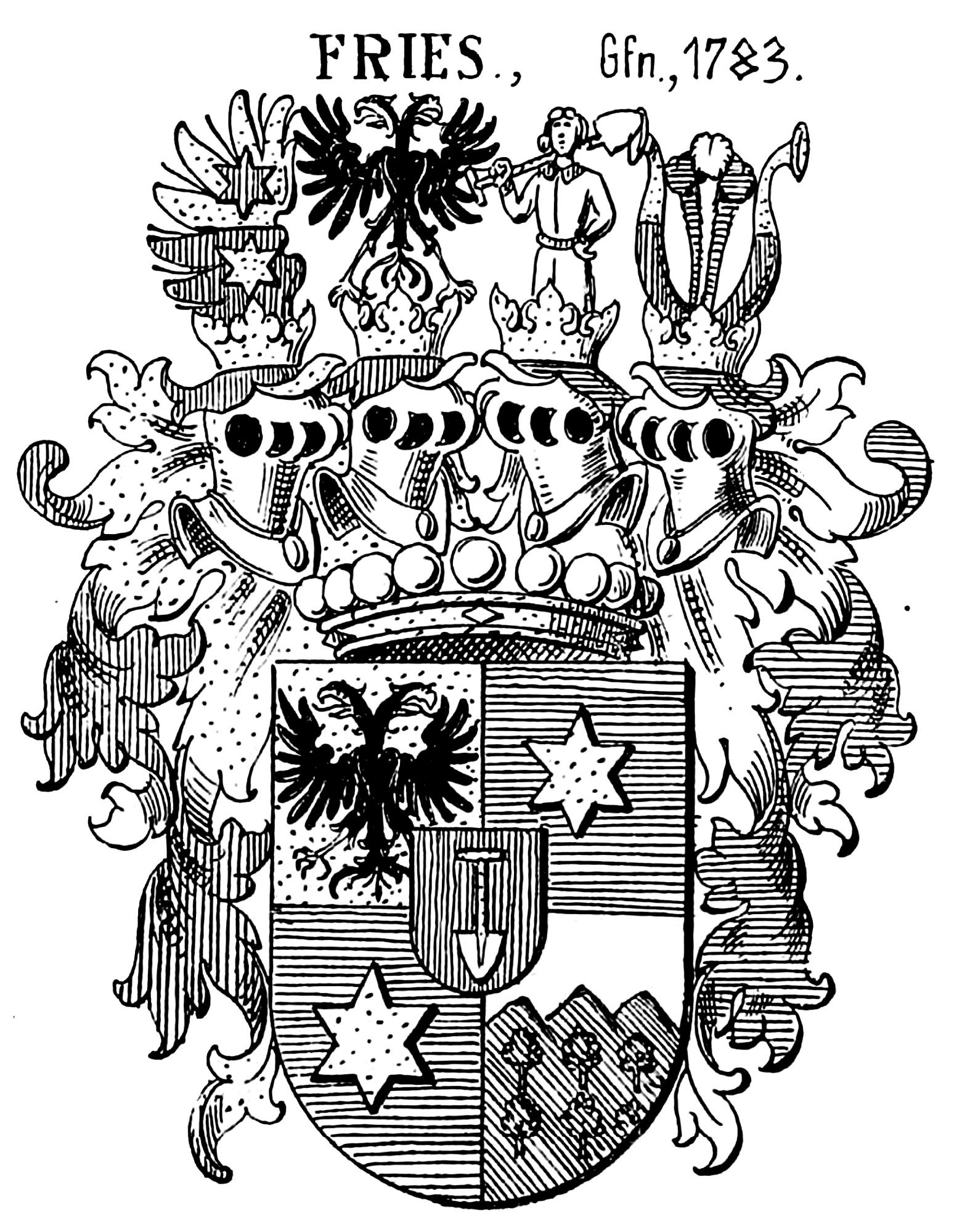
Arms of the counts von Fries (1783), reproduced in Siebmacher, 1918, plate 50.

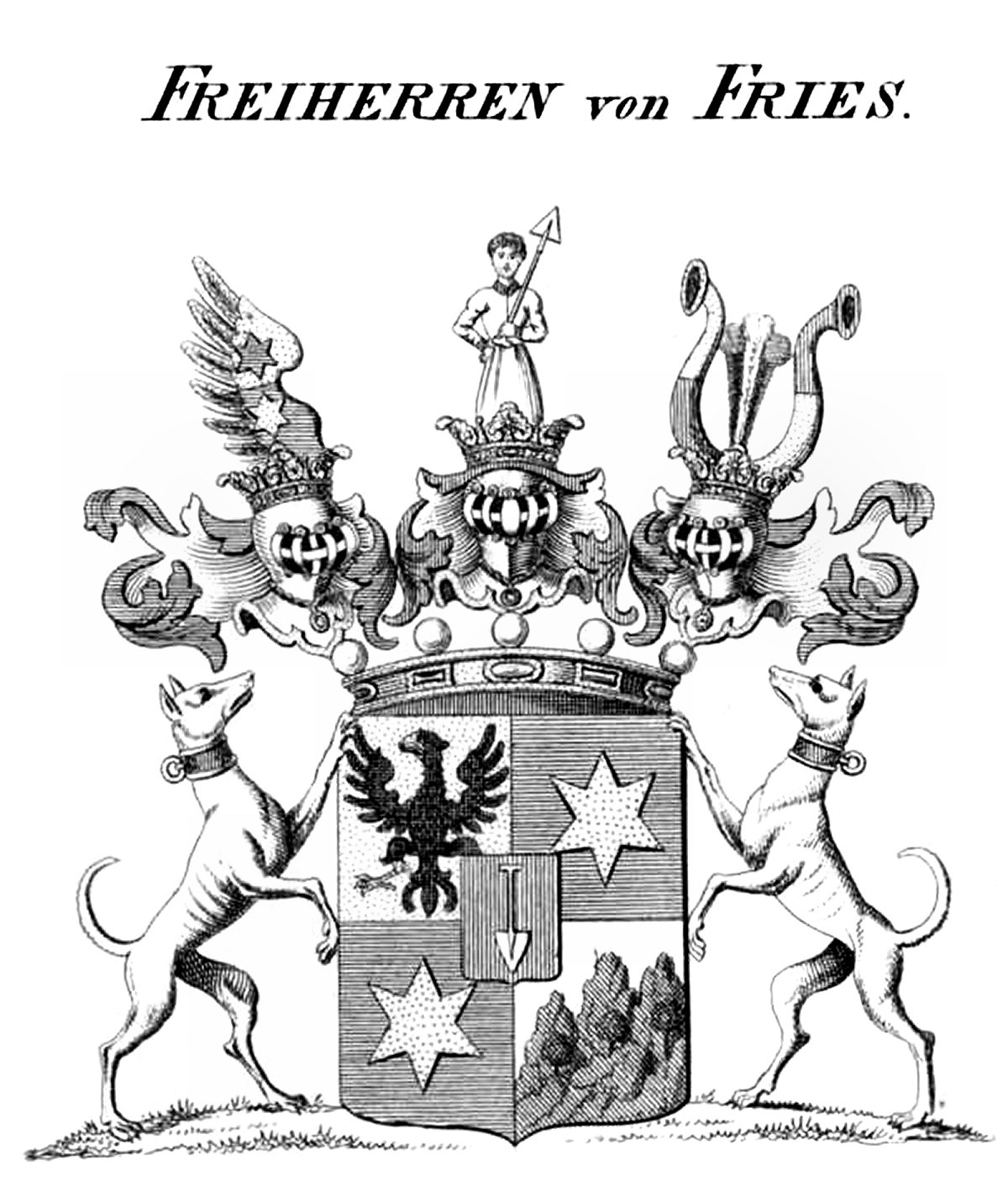
Fries arms in Tyroff's Wappenbuch der österreichischen Monarchie (1831–1868).

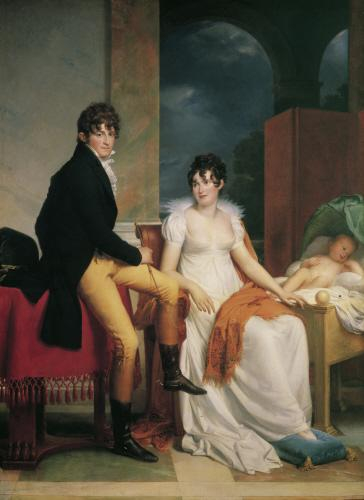
François Gérard, Count Moritz Christian Fries and His Family, c. 1804. Belvedere, Vienna, inventory no. 3386.

Élisabeth Vigée Le Brun, Sophia Fries as Sappho, c. 1793. Jaroměřice Castle.

== Selected genealogy ==
Selected members are shown below; not all children are included.

- Jean-Jacques Fries, burgher of Mulhouse in 1649; married Salomé Barbette
  - Philippe-Jacques Fries, burgomaster (1742–1746)
    - Jean-Jacques Fries (born 1685), married Ursule Bregenzer
      - Johann von Fries (1719–1785), banker in Vienna
        - Joseph von Fries (1765–1788)
        - Moritz von Fries (1777–1826), patron of the arts
          - Moritz von Fries (1804–1887)
            - August von Fries (1841–1918), genealogist
  - Valentin Fries (1660–1746), married Margreth Hartmann
    - Josias Fries (born 1707), married Sara Wirz
      - Emmanuel Fries (1747–1789), physician
        - Emmanuel Fries (1778–1850), painter; married Barbe Schlumberger (1783–1860)
          - Jean Fries (1804–1887), industrialist in Guebwiller
            - Jules Fries (1831–1903)
              - Camille Fries (1871–1952), architect
                - Jean-Paul-André Fries (born 1925)
                  - Éric Fries (born 1960)
            - Émile Fries (1834–1914), school director
              - Henri / Henry Fries (1863–1934)
                - Pierre Fries (1895–1965)
                  - Christiane Fries (1925–2024); married Pierre Scrivener
                  - Jean-Gérard Fries (1927–2012), member of the Court of Audit
                  - Daniel Fries (1930–2022), professor of medicine
                    - Fabrice Fries (born 1960)
                    - Charles Fries (born 1962)

Philipp Jakob von Fries (1753–1822), son of the pastor Philippe-Jacques Fries (1715–1784), established a parallel baronial branch. He was Johann von Fries's nephew.

== See also ==
- Johann von Fries
- Moritz von Fries
- History of Mulhouse

== Bibliography ==
=== Independent historical studies and biographical entries consulted ===
- Gustav Otruba, notices « Fries, Johann » et « Fries, Moritz Christian Johann », Neue Deutsche Biographie, vol. 5, 1961, p. 604–606.
- Raymond Oberlé, notices « Fries, Friess », « Fries Veltin III » et « Fries Emmanuel », Nouveau dictionnaire de biographie alsacienne, 1988, édition en ligne.
- Nicolas Schreck, « Fininger, affaire », Dictionnaire historique de la Suisse, 2003.
- Nicolas Stoskopf, « Une réussite méconnue : le Comptoir d’escompte de Mulhouse (1848–1930) », Annuaire historique de Mulhouse, no 27, 2016, p. 191–206.

=== Specialist studies identified but not consulted in full ===
- Christian Steeb, Die Grafen von Fries: eine Schweizer Familie und ihre wirtschaftspolitische und kulturhistorische Bedeutung für Österreich zwischen 1750 und 1830, Bad Vöslau, 1999.
- Bernard Jacqué, « Un Mulhousien émigré et sa mémoire : le comte Fries et Mulhouse », Annuaire historique de Mulhouse, t. 24, 2013, p. 17–22.

=== Genealogical and family studies ===
- Éric Bungener (dir.), Filiations protestantes, vol. I, France, t. 1, Paris, Éditions familiales, 1996, p. 419–422.
- August Graf von Fries, Die Grafen von Fries: eine genealogische Studie, Vienne, 1884 ; deuxième édition, Dresde, 1903.
- Dominique Kaplan et collaborateurs, « La famille Fries de Mulhouse, cinq siècles d’histoire », Cahiers du Centre de généalogie protestante, nos 119 et 121, 2012–2013.
