= Violin Sonata No. 5 (Beethoven) =

Beethoven's musical work known as "Spring Sonata"

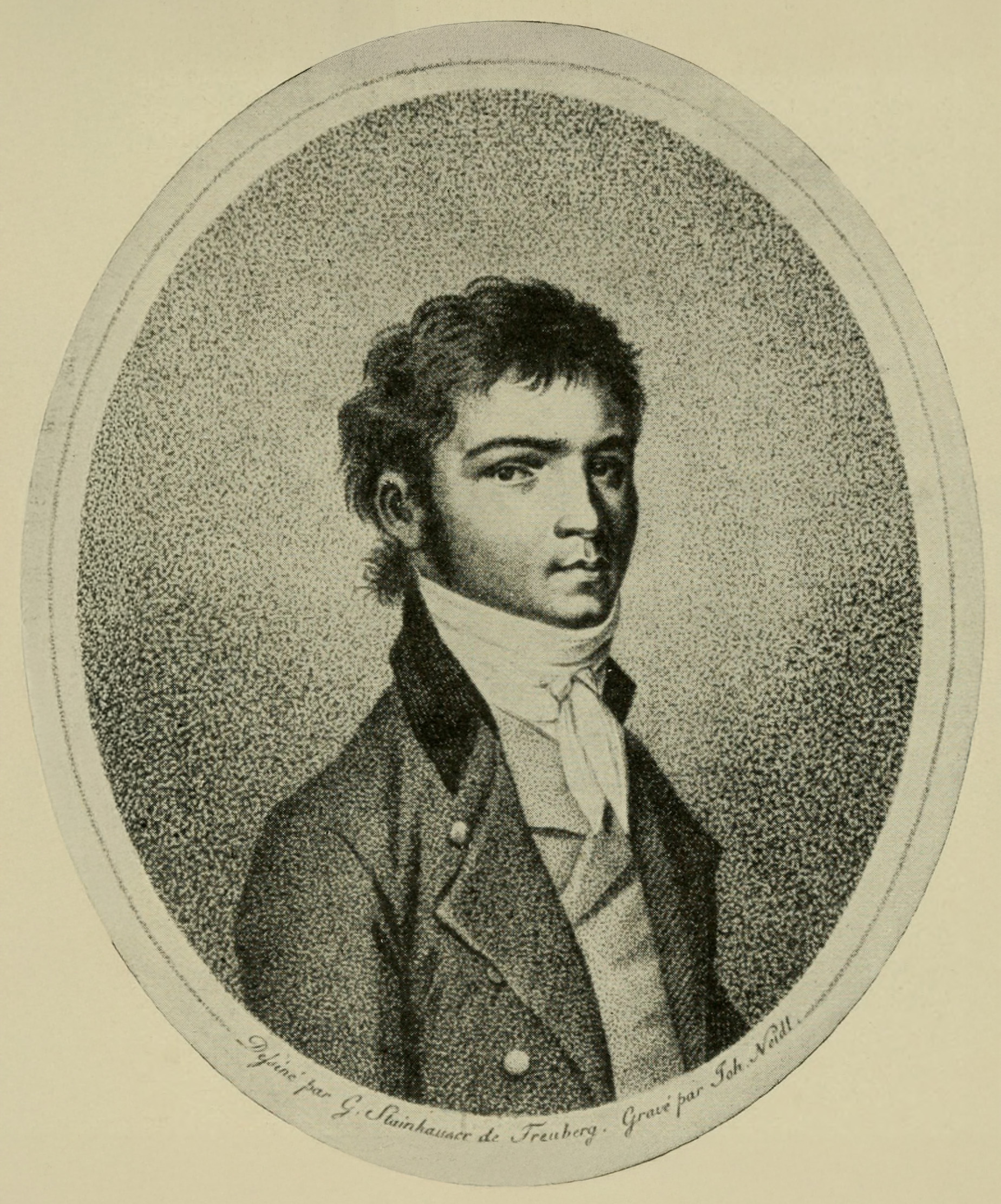
The earliest known portrait of Beethoven; 1801 engraving by Johann Joseph Neidl after a now-lost portrait by Gandolph Ernst Stainhauser von Treuberg, c. 1800

The Violin Sonata No. 5 in F major, Op. 24, is a four movement work for violin and piano by Ludwig van Beethoven. It was first published in 1801. The work is commonly known as the Spring Sonata (Frühlingssonate), although the name "Spring" was apparently given to it after Beethoven's death. The sonata was dedicated to Count Moritz von Fries, a patron to whom Beethoven also dedicated two other works of the same year—the String Quintet in C major, Op. 29 and the Violin Sonata No. 4—as well as his later Symphony No. 7 in A major.

The autograph manuscript of the sonata is preserved in the Austrian National Library.

== Origin ==
Beethoven initially intended to pair this work with his Violin Sonata No. 4, Opus 23, and the two sonatas complement each other in both key and character. However, the two were not published together and thus have different opus numbers. The reason for the separation is unknown.

== Structure ==
The work is in four movements:

1. Allegro
2. Adagio molto espressivo（B flat major）
3. Scherzo: Allegro molto
4. Rondo: Allegro ma non troppo

The entire sonata takes between 23–26 minutes to perform.

== See also ==
- Violin Sonata in A major (Beethoven)
