= Lutheran City Church =

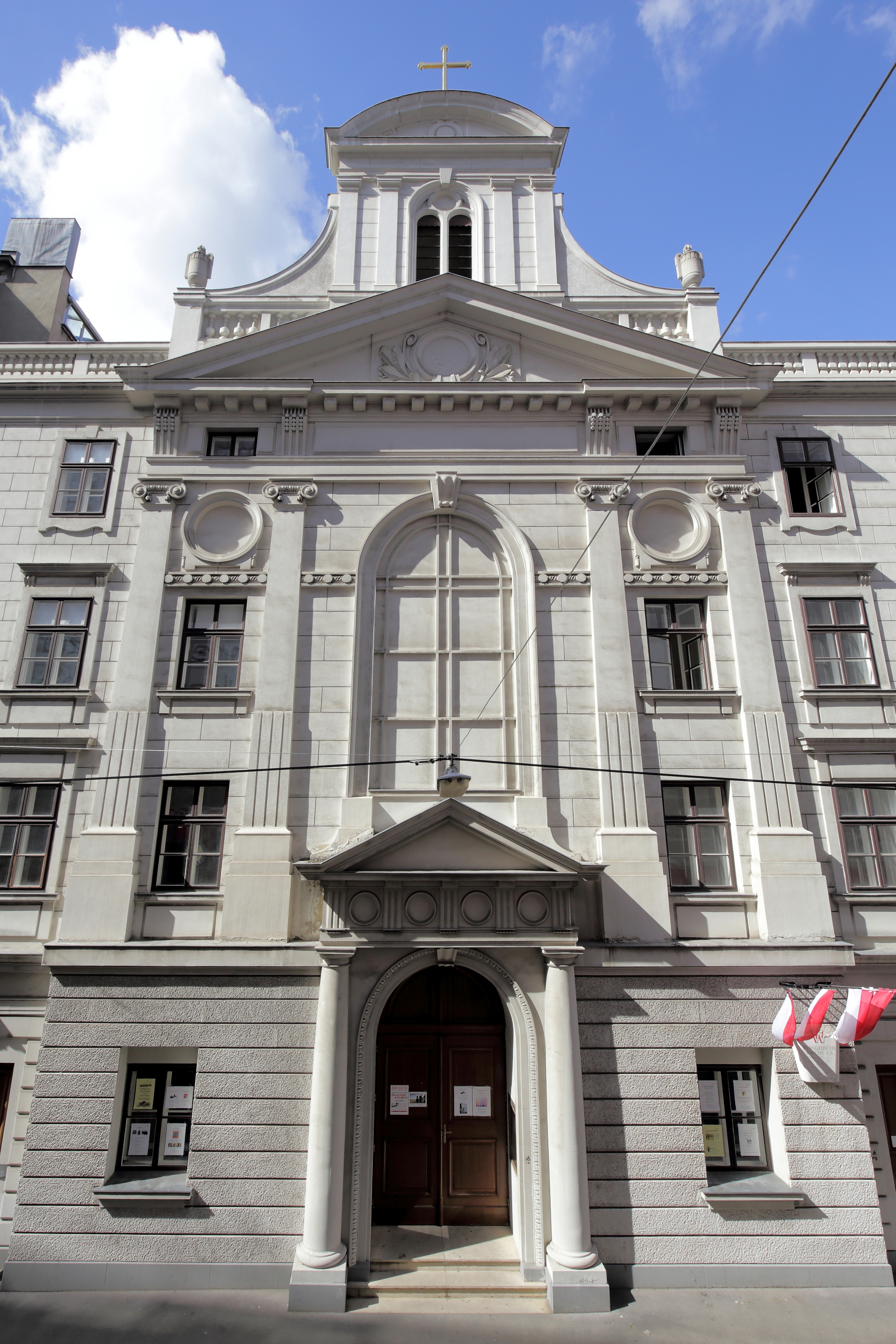
- Lutheran City Church
- 48°12′24″N 16°22′07″E
- Location: Dorotheergasse 18, A-1010 Vienna
- Country: Austria
- Denomination: Lutheranism
- Website: Official Website

Architecture
- Functional status: Active
- Architect(s): Pietro Ferabosco, Jakob Vivian
- Architectural type: Church
- Style: Renaissance
- Completed: 1583

Administration
- Diocese: Lutheran Superintendency of Vienna

Clergy
- Pastor(s): Wilfried Fussenegger, Julia Schnizlein, Ines-Charlotte Knoll (retired)

The Lutheran City Church is a Lutheran church building in Innere Stadt, the first district of Vienna.

== Location and architecture ==
The Lutheran City Church is located at Dorotheergasse 18, next to the Reformed City Church and opposite of the auction house Dorotheum. It was built in the Renaissance period and has a neoclassical facade. There is a triangular pediment above the main entrance. A blind, round arched window is attached to this pediment. It is flanked by two pilasters on each side and topped by large triangular pediment. The Lutheran City Church has no steeple, but a bell-storey.

The aisleless church has a transept-like extension giving it a cruciform floor plan. On all sides of the church there are matronea. The altarpiece painted by Franz Linder in 1783 is a copy of van Dyck's painting Christ on the Cross, which is kept in the Kunsthistorisches Museum just a short walk away. The carved choir stalls next to the altar were installed in 1876. The baptismal font on a scagliola column was transferred to the church in 1822. The hearts of Empress Anna, Emperor Matthias and Emperor Ferdinand II were originally buried in the building. The marble locking plates of their burial niches are located in the back of the church. Plaques commemorating the Protestant martyr Caspar Tauber and Emperor Joseph II are attached to the walls.

== History ==
The Lutheran City Church was built as the monastery church of the Catholic Queen’s Monastery (Königinkloster in German) from 1582 to 1583. The Poor Clare monastery was consecrated to Mary, Queen of the Angels. It was founded by Elisabeth of Austria, daughter of Emperor Maximilian II and widow of King Charles IX of France. The queen dowager established the monastery probably as an atonement for the St. Bartholomew's Day massacre and spent her final years there. The original construction plans of the Queen’s Monastery are by Pietro Ferabosco. The construction was carried out by Jakob Vivian, the later Architect to the Imperial Court.

In the course of the Josephinist reforms, the monastery was abandoned in 1782. The same year, both a Lutheran and a Reformed congregation were able to constitute themselves in Vienna due to the Patent of Toleration of 1781. The parish based in the Lutheran City Church is the oldest of the Lutheran Superintendency of Vienna’s parishes. The Lutheran and the Reformed congregation both bought a part of the former Queen’s Monastery in 1783. The Reformed congregation built the Reformed City Church which was the first building in Vienna intended to be a Protestant church from the beginning. The Lutheran parish purchased the central part of the abandoned monastery including the monastery church. The other parts of the premises were acquired by the banker Johann von Fries who built the Palais Pallavicini there. The former monastery church was extended and converted into a Lutheran church. The three church towers had to be removed since the Patent of Toleration stated that Protestant churches should not be recognizable as churches from the outside. On 30 November 1783, the Lutheran City Church was inaugurated.

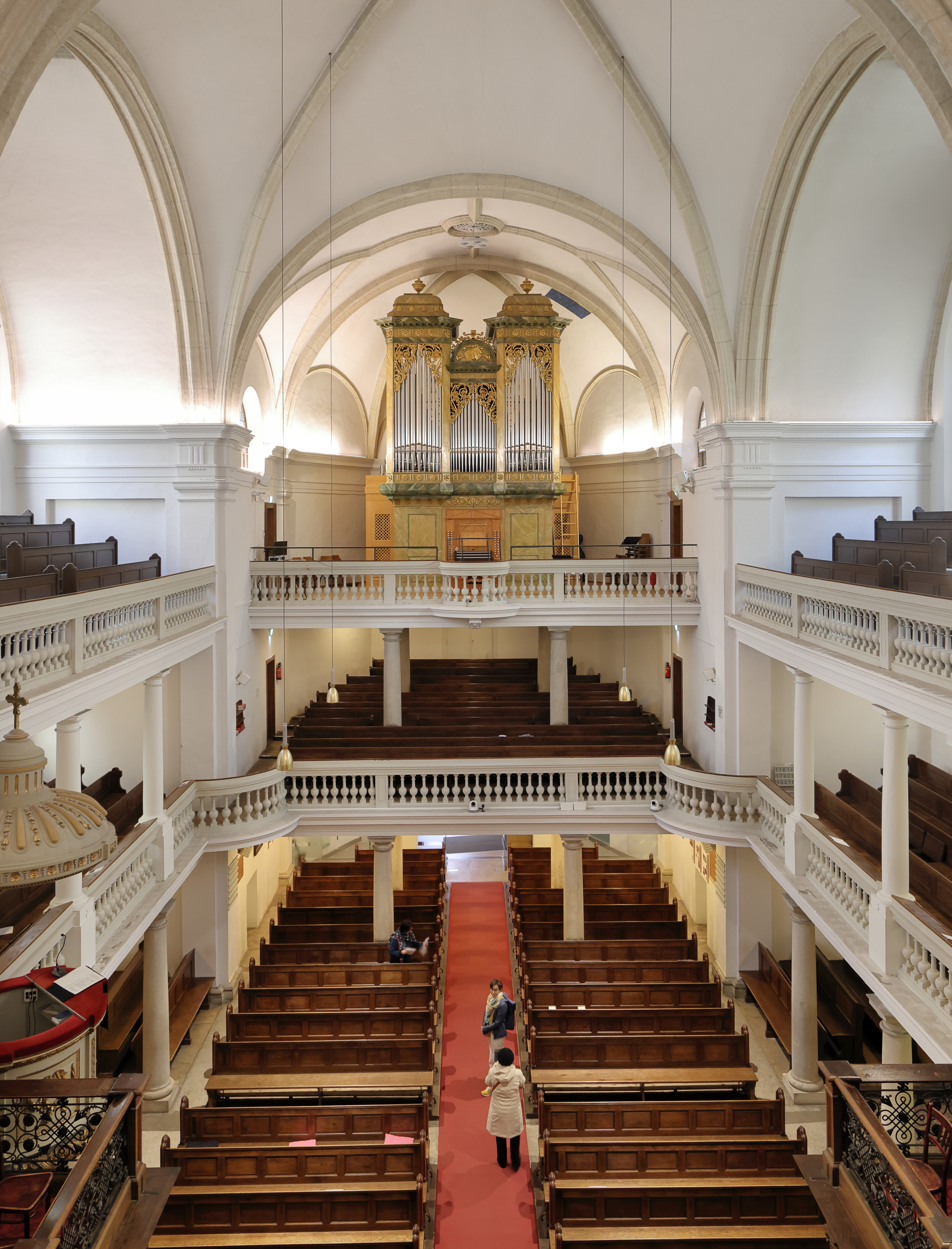
Interior view

After a few minor structural changes a major modification of the building was carried out by the architect Otto Thienemann in 1876. The facade was redesigned so that the church was recognizable as such from the outside as well. This had been allowed by the Protestant Patent of 1861. In the 19th century, the composers Franz Lachner and Hermann Graedener were employed as organists in the Lutheran City Church and the distinguished piano maker Johann Andreas Streicher released a new service hymnal. The Lutheran City Church had to be rebuilt again in 1907 due to more stringent fire regulations after the Ringtheaterbrand. A direct exit to the street became necessary. The architect Ludwig Schöne turned the interior at 180 degrees by swapping the positions of the organ and the altar – an approach similar to the rebuilding of the neighboring Reformed City Church carried out by the architect Ignaz Sowinski in 1887. In World War II, the Lutheran City Church suffered severe damage. The facade was completely destroyed by an aircraft bomb in 1945. In 1948, the facade was rebuilt: plain, with bricked up windows and a distinctive stone cross on the smooth facade. This conversion was reversed in 1989 by restoring the neoclassical facade of 1907.
