= Reformed City Church of Vienna =

Church in Austria

- Reformierte Stadtkirche Wien
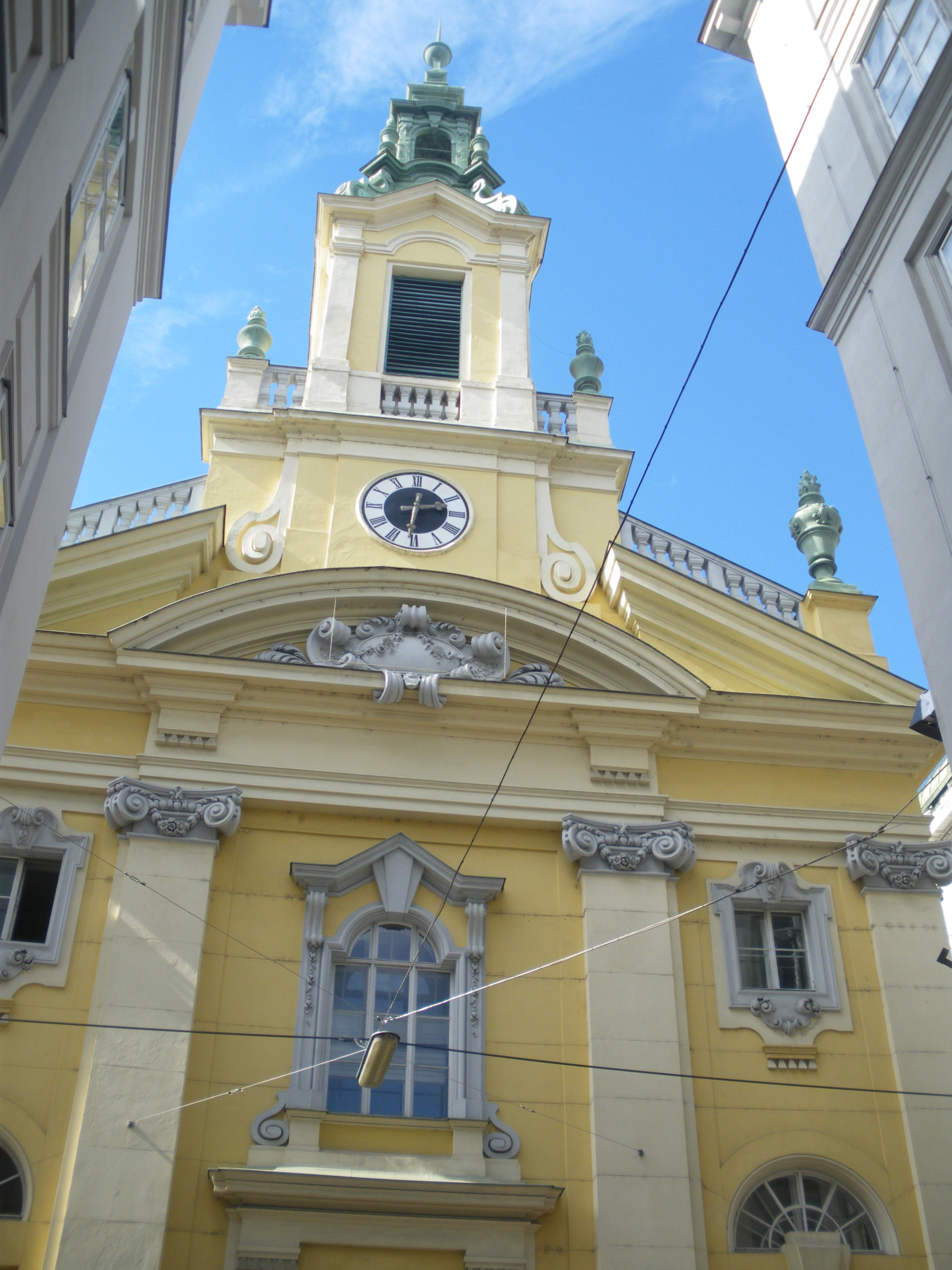
- Reformed City Church of Vienna
- 48°12′25″N 16°22′07″E
- Country: Austria
- Website: https://www.reformiertestadtkirche.at

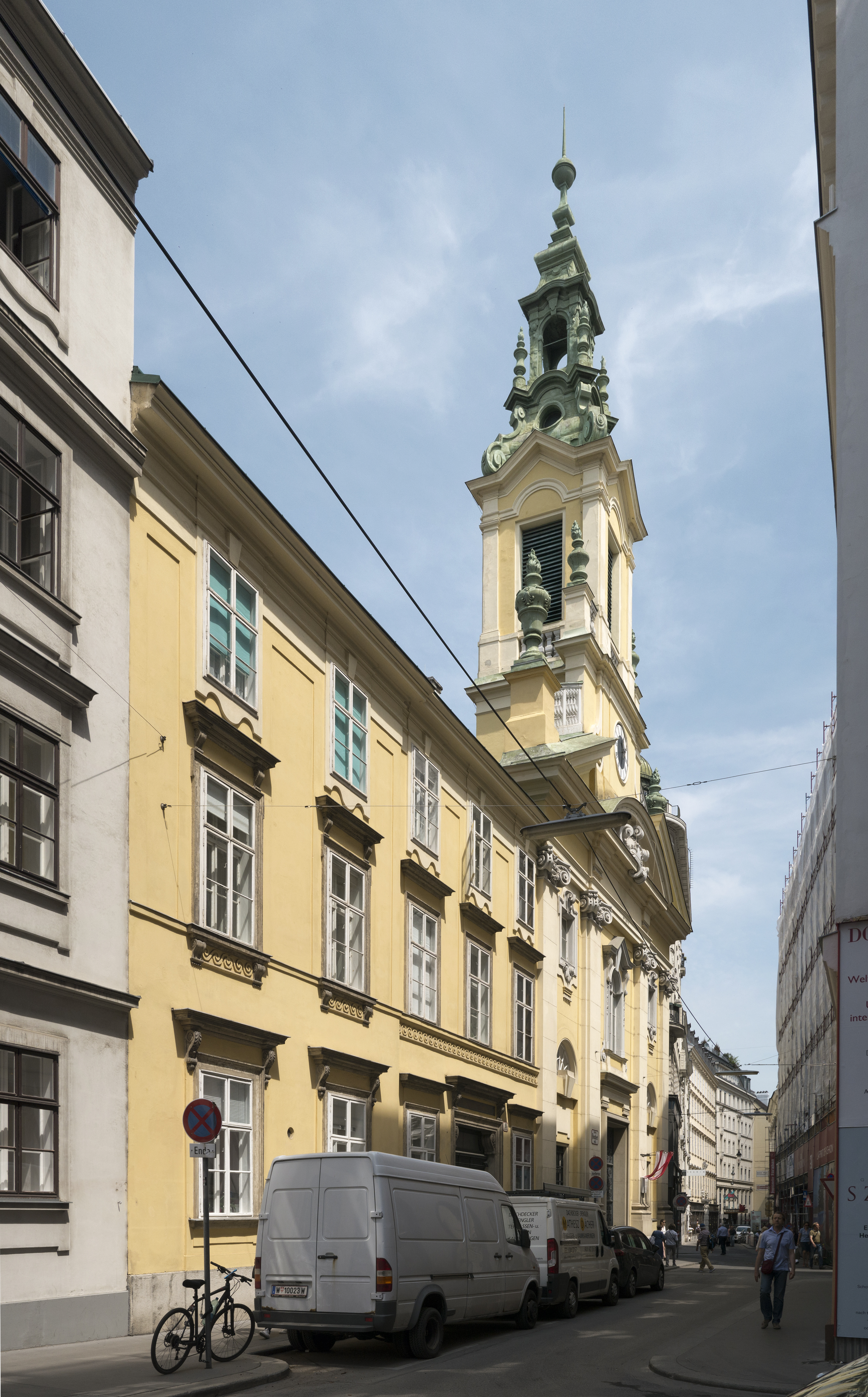
Rectory and main front of the Reformed City Church on Dorotheergasse

The Reformed City Church of Vienna is a church building that belongs to the Evangelical Church of the Helvetic Confession in Austria. It is located in Vienna's 1st municipal district, Innere Stadt, on Dorotheergasse.

Situated at the corner of narrow streets in the old town, the church and its vicarage were constructed as a Tolerance Prayer House for the local Reformed parish, established in 1782 following the Tolerance Patent. The Classicist building complex, erected on the site of an abandoned monastery between 1783 and 1784, was designed by architect Gottlieb Nigelli. In 1887, the church received a neo-Baroque single-tower façade, designed by Ignaz Sowinski. Reflecting the Reformed interpretation of the Second Commandment, the interior of the church is devoid of images.

The Reformed City Church serves as the seat of the Evangelical Parish of H.B. Innere Stadt and the Evangelical Church of H.B. in Austria. It is also home to several foreign-language congregations, which are organized under various legal frameworks and host cultural events. The church is a protected historical monument.

== History ==
=== Previous history ===
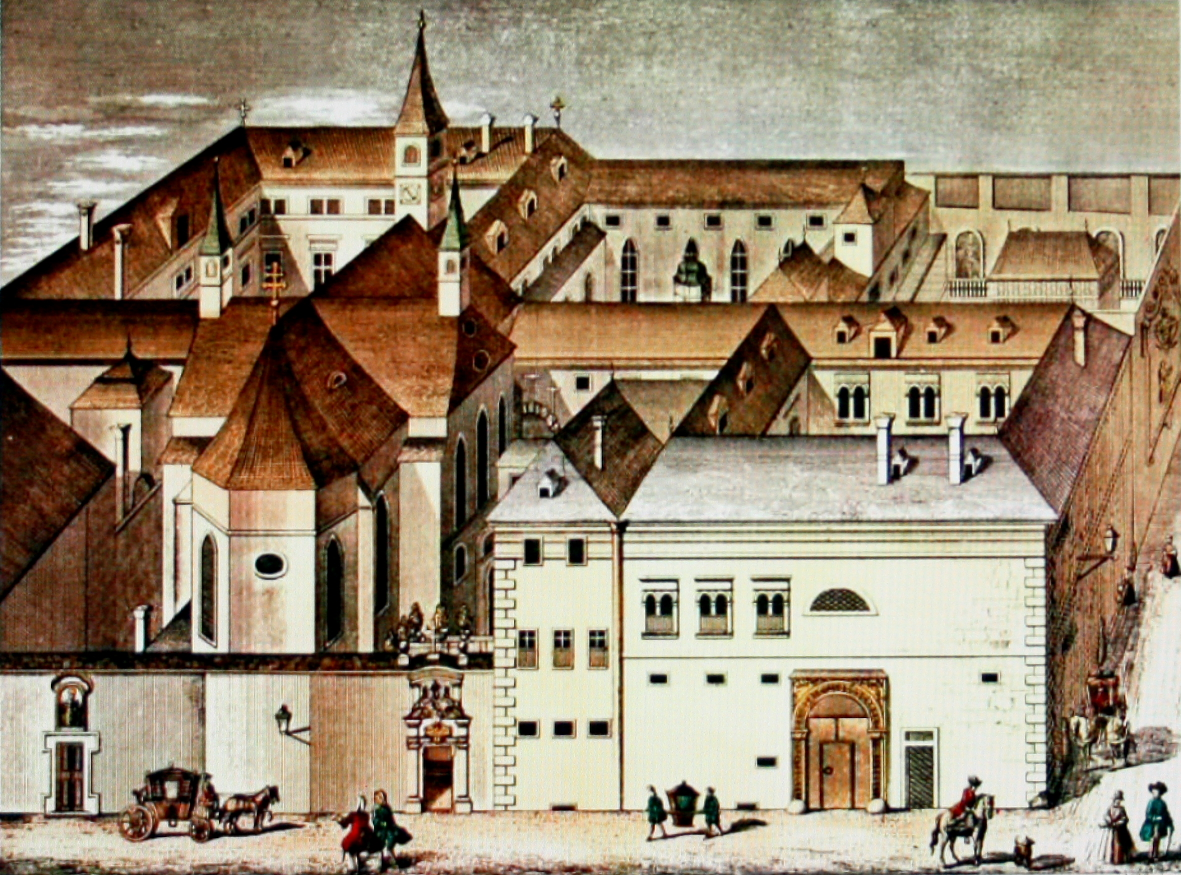
Royal monastery. After a bird's eye view from the Cosmographia Austriaco-Franciscana by Placidus Herzog (1740). View from the east, Dorotheergasse in front, today's Stallburggasse on the right.

Protestant church services in Vienna were prohibited until the issuance of the Tolerance Patent by Emperor Joseph II in 1781. During the Counter-Reformation, secret Protestantism primarily existed in more remote areas of Austria. An exception to this prohibition, tolerated by the state despite opposition from the Vienna Archbishops, was the Reformed church services held at the Dutch legation in Vienna. These services were accessible to the Viennese population and conducted in German. The first known legation preacher was Philipp Otto Vietor, who served in Vienna from 1671 to 1673.

The worship community of the Dutch legation laid the foundation for the Viennese Reformed congregation (H.B.), which was formally established following the Tolerance Patent on 2 March 1782. The congregation appointed Carl Wilhelm Hilchenbach, the former legation preacher, as its first pastor. On 13 March 1782, the parish purchased the farm buildings of the former Royal Monastery for 23,900 guilders to construct a Tolerance Prayer House with a rectory. The monastery, described by the travel writer Friedrich Nicolai as having a "miserable reputation," was among the first to be dissolved during the Josephine Church Reform. Similarly, the Viennese Lutheran congregation (A.B.) was founded as a result of the Tolerance Patent and acquired the former monastery church adjacent to the farm buildings, which was converted into the Lutheran City Church. The farm buildings were subsequently demolished. Gottlieb Nigelli, a sub-architect in the Court Building Office and protégé of State Chancellor Wenzel Kaunitz, was assigned the task of planning the Reformed House of Prayer. At the time the contract was awarded, Nigelli was not yet a recognized or experienced architect.

=== Building history ===
==== Built as a Tolerance Prayer House (1783-1784) and first adaptations ====
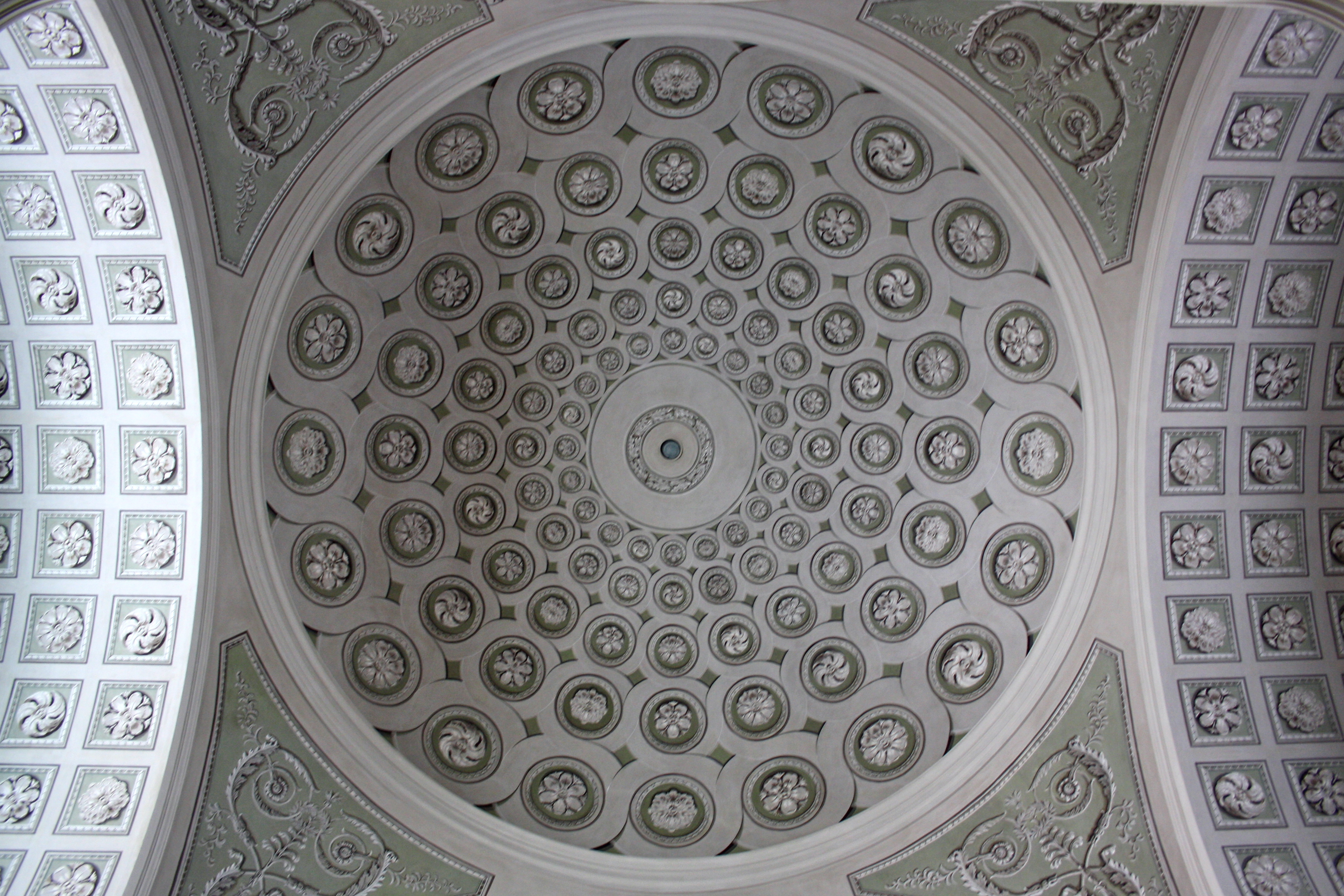
One of the two classicist domes of the Tolerance House of Prayer

The foundation stone for the Tolerance Prayer House was laid on 26 March 1783. In accordance with the provisions of the Tolerance Patent, the building was required to be indistinguishable as a church from the outside and lacked a street-side entrance. As a result, architect Gottlieb Nigelli designed the street façade to resemble a simple residential building, with the two main portals concealed within an inner courtyard not visible from the alley. The interior was designed in a Classicist style, which was considered progressive for its time. The house of prayer was consecrated on 25 December 1784.

The industrialist and banker Johann von Fries, who made the largest financial contribution to the construction of the prayer house, simultaneously commissioned the Palais Fries-Pallavicini on another plot of the former royal monastery. The neoclassical palace was designed by Johann Ferdinand Hetzendorf von Hohenberg, Nigelli's superior in the Court Building Office. A controversy arose between supporters of both architects regarding the artistic quality of the new buildings, a debate that was discussed in various journals and pamphlets. The Fries-Pallavicini Palace faced criticism for the unusual proportions of its exterior and the elaborate caryatids by Franz Anton von Zauner at the main portal. Some commentators suggested that "the architect's intention seems to have been deliberately to draw the eye away from the essentials of the building so as not to notice the flaws of the whole."

In contrast, the Reformed House of Prayer faced the challenge of "drawing the line between extravagant splendor and raw simplicity; and woe betide the architect who is not philosopher enough before he picks up the tools." An anonymous author, presumably Nigelli, responded to these critiques, likely receiving a reply from Hohenberg, accusing him of being "Vienna's Trasyllus," referencing the ancient philosopher who compromised his integrity through his relationship with Emperor Tiberius. As a result of this controversy, Hohenberg had Nigelli transferred from Vienna to the provincial building directorate in Brno.

In 1794, the Reformed and Lutheran parishes in Vienna established a joint school, initially held in the parsonages of both parishes. These parsonages were connected on the second floor by an opening in the firewall, which was later bricked up. Since 1862, the school has been located in a building on Karlsplatz.

Archduchess Henriette of Austria, born a princess of Nassau-Weilburg, maintained her Reformed faith after marrying Archduke Karl of Austria in 1815 and relocating to Vienna. However, it was considered inappropriate for an archduchess to enter the church through a back door in an inner courtyard. In response, court architect Johann Amann obtained permission in 1815 for a structural modification that complied with the Tolerance Patent restrictions. He created an entrance in the side façade of the prayer house, leading into an intermediate passageway that was designated as not part of the actual sacred space. This entrance, known as the Henriettentor, was reserved exclusively for the archduchess. After Henriette's death in the summer of 1830, the gate was walled up.

==== Conversion from 1887 ====
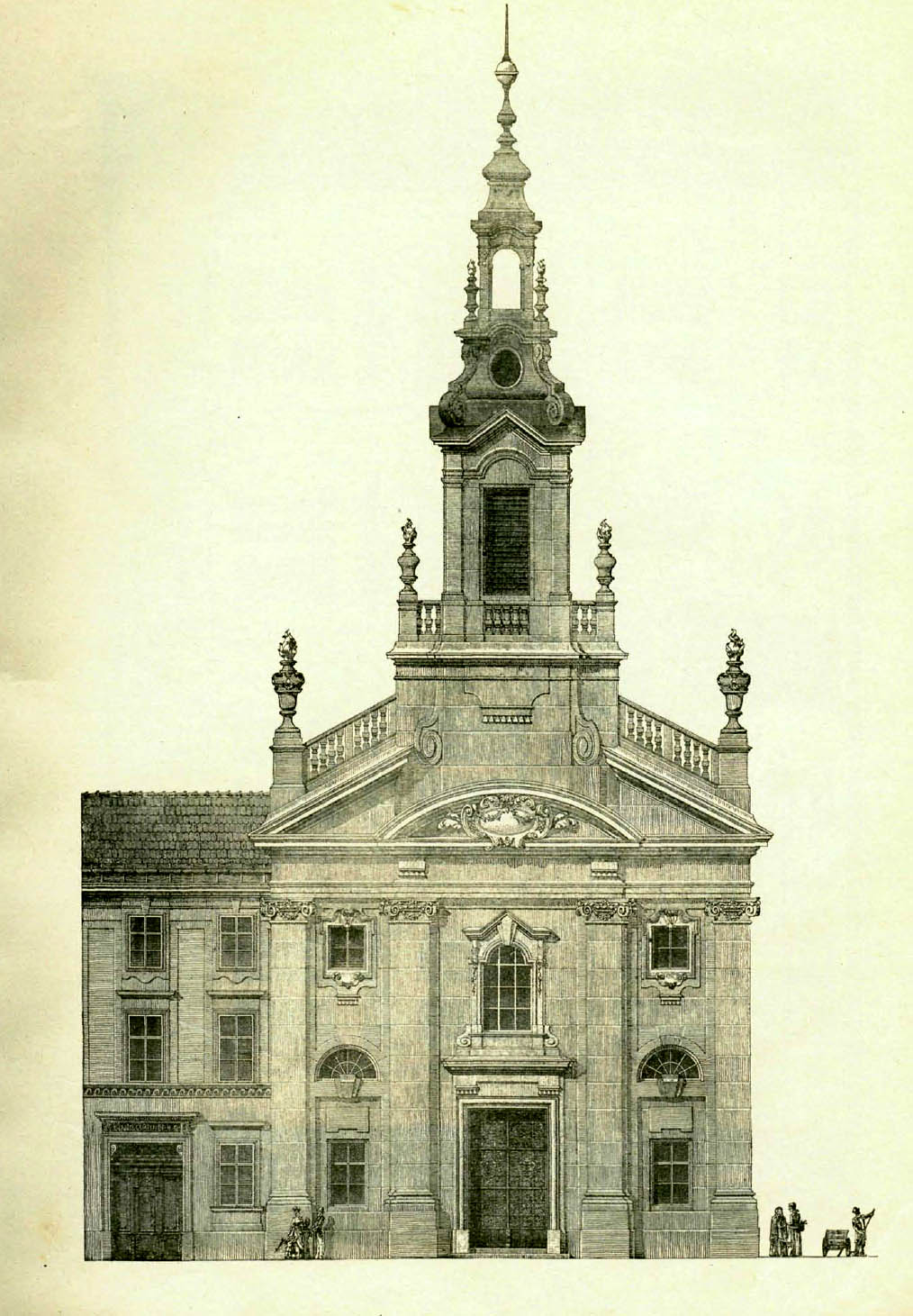
Ignaz Sowinski's design for the new main façade

The Protestant Patent of 1861 granted Protestants in Austria more extensive rights than the Tolerance Patent issued 80 years earlier, allowing the exterior of the prayer house to resemble that of a church. After years of deliberation, the leadership of the congregation decided in 1885 to redesign the building, which included changes to the external appearance and adaptations to the rectory to meet contemporary living requirements. Architect Ignaz Sowinski, a pupil of Heinrich von Ferstel, won a public tender for the project in 1887. Sowinski was just at the beginning of his career at that time.

Construction work began on 8 August 1887. The exterior was entirely transformed into the neo-Baroque style, making the Reformed prayer house the first Protestant church in Vienna to feature a church tower. Sowinski also added a new main portal to the neo-Baroque façade facing Dorotheergasse. Neo-Baroque, theoretically supported by art historian Albert Ilg, increasingly became recognized as an Austrian "national style" in the 1880s. The side façade facing Stallburggasse was also redesigned.

The new main entrance necessitated a redesign of the interior. The positions of the pulpit and organ were swapped, and the church interior was rotated by 180 degrees. A new organ loft was constructed above the main portal in the original apse, and the existing right-side gallery was extended, increasing the total seating capacity to 205. The rectory largely retained its previous external appearance, though significant structural modifications were made internally. Due to dampness on the ground floor, a basement was added. The layout of the rooms on the two upper floors was altered, and new corridors were created. All sanitary facilities, as well as gas, water, and electricity pipes, doors, windows, floors, and the heating system, were completely renewed. The two connecting wings between the rectory and the church were also updated with a newly constructed staircase and sacristy.

The conversion incurred previously unestimated costs. For the rectory's basement, the remains of the foundation of the Königinkloster monastery, made of quarry stone masonry, had to be removed through chiseling work, and a new foundation was subsequently laid for the firewall of the rectory. The construction work was completed within the planned timeframe on 3 December 1887; however, construction costs escalated from the originally estimated 6,500 Austrian guilders to 56,239 guilders.

==== Structural changes after 1887 ====
After the reconstruction in 1887, the essential features of the Reformed Town Church remained largely unchanged. In 1895, three bells were installed in the church tower for the first time, named after their donors: Christoph and Berta Cloeter (parents of author Hermine Cloeter) and Philipp Ritter von Schoeller, along with contributions from parishioners. During World War I, the state confiscated these bells for melting. Following a collection among parishioners, three new bells were cast in 1932 by the Pfundner Bell Foundry, although the two larger bells were melted down during World War II. In 1979, after a donation from presbyter Karl Matysek, the Grassmayr Bell Foundry recast two new bells along with the remaining original bell.

Interior and exterior renovations were conducted in 1901 and 1906, with further work occurring during the interwar period in 1928 and 1934, as well as during the occupation of Austria in 1952 and 1953. A comprehensive interior restoration in 1962 aimed to approximate the original Classicist form of the church, during which parts of the original wall paintings were uncovered. The entire building complex was restored between 1979 and 1984. InIn April 1997, the Reformed City Church became the first church building in Austria to install a photovoltaic system. The 30 m^{2} solar system on the church roof has an annual electricity yield of approximately 2,800 kWh. The last exterior restoration of the church was carried out in 1999. In the summer of 2006, the interior of the church was renovated, and the parish hall, kitchen, and toilet facilities were refurbished.

=== History of use ===
The Reformed City Church serves as the seat of the Protestant parish of H.B. Vienna Innere Stadt and as the headquarters for the leadership of the Protestant Church of H.B. in Austria, known as the Oberkirchenrat H.B. It is also home to the church's newspaper, Reformiertes Kirchenblatt. Regular Sunday services have always begun at ten o'clock, a tradition since the congregation's founding.

In its early years, the congregation observed the Tolerance Festival on 13 October to commemorate Emperor Joseph II's Patent of Tolerance issued in 1781. However, this tradition was discontinued during the Revolutions of 1848 and replaced by a church service for Reformation Day on 31 October. Other widely celebrated Christian feast day services have only been held in the Reformed City Church since the second half of the 20th century: the Christmas Mass has been celebrated annually since 1957, and the Easter Vigil since 1972. The Palm Thursday service, first celebrated in 1969, always takes place on the Thursday before Palm Sunday. At the time of its introduction, it was the only service in Vienna where members of other denominations were officially invited to partake in communion.

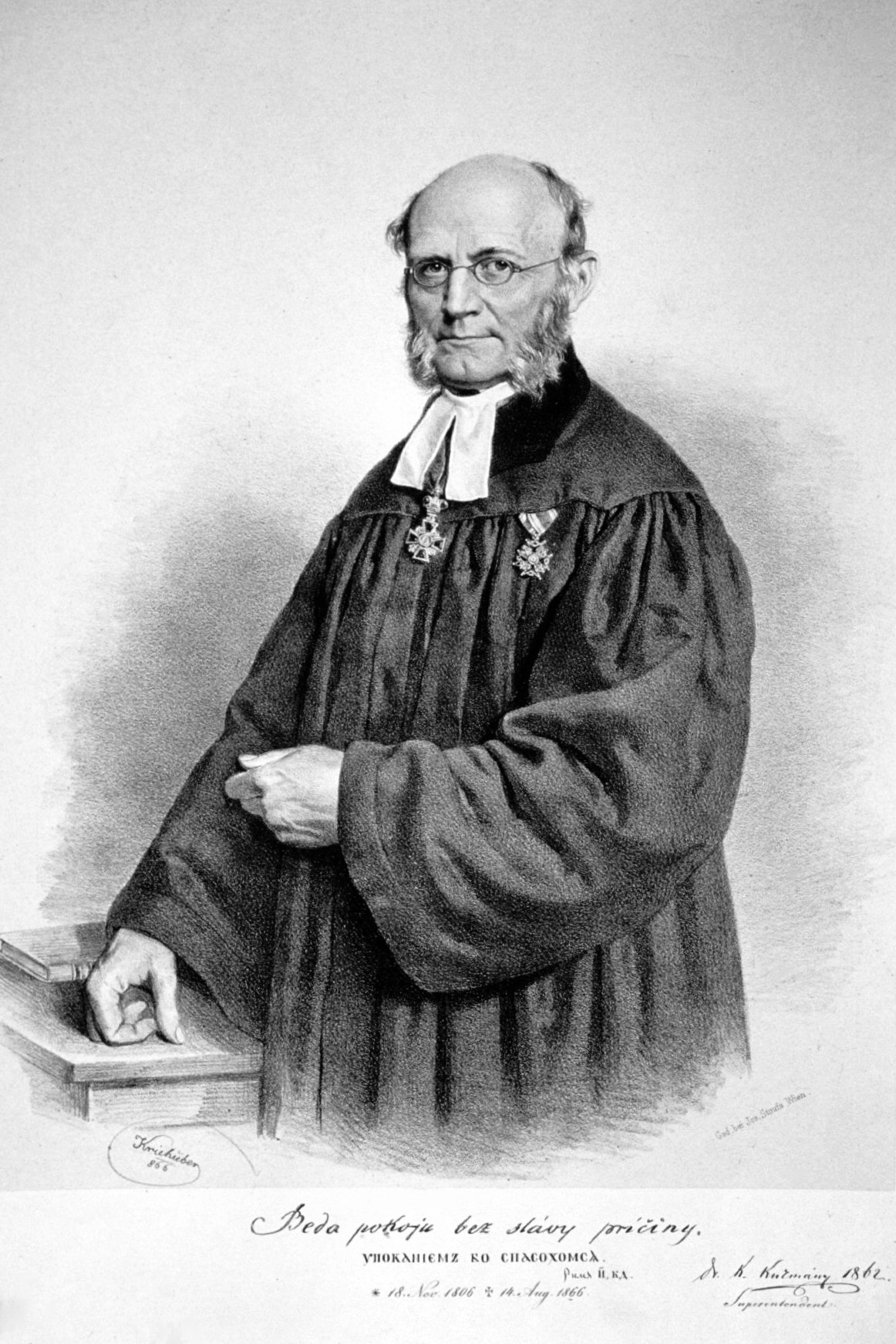
Karol Kuzmány, Lithograph of Josef Kriehuber (1866)

Additionally, the Reformed City Church has hosted services in various languages. In 1851, theology professor Karol Kuzmány and his students began holding regular Czech-language services in the church. This tradition was continued by Heřman z Tardy, who came from Prussian Silesia and was appointed senior church councilor in Vienna in 1867. In 1891, Tardy initiated an association with the goal of founding a separate Czech Reformed congregation and building a congregation center. However, this project was hindered by financial difficulties following World War I. Czech-language services continued regularly until 1945 and occasionally until 1969.

From 1868 until shortly before World War I, two guest preachers held a French-language service every Sunday after the German-language service. Since the early 20th century, there have been occasional Hungarian-language services, typically organized by the Reformed Church in Hungary. The influx of Reformed refugees to Austria following the Hungarian National Uprising of 1956 led to the establishment of the Hungarian Pastoral Service (USD), which operates under the Evangelical Church of H.B. in Austria. The USD holds services at the Reformed City Church every Sunday at 5 p.m. Additionally, the Vienna Community Church (VCC), an interdenominational association founded in 1957, celebrates English-language services every Sunday at noon in the Reformed City Church.

Each year, the Reformed parish hosts a charitable Advent market known as the "Henriettenmarkt," named after the Reformed Archduchess Henriette of Austria. This market commemorates her introduction of the Christmas tree decorated with candles in Vienna in 1816, a tradition she brought from her home in Nassau-Weilburg. The custom later gained popularity among the Viennese aristocracy, including Emperor Franz I. In the first half of the 20th century, the church had its own choir, the Evangelical Reformed Choir Association, which was directed by Fritz Schreiber in 1924.

The Reformed City Church has a long tradition as a concert venue. The blind court organist Josef Labor gave several concerts there from 1905 to 1907, and in the 1930s, the Vienna State Opera, the Wiener Männergesang-Verein, and mezzo-soprano Rosette Anday performed in the church. In the 1980s, the Mozart Boys' Choir also performed regularly. During the 2006 renovations, efforts were made to improve the church's suitability for concerts, including the installation of a sound system, enhanced lighting, and castors for the communion table. From 2004 to 2011, the Reformed City Church also served as an annual venue for the Vienna Independent Shorts film festival.

=== Pastor and church leadership ===
Pastor of the Reformed City Church
Name	Term of office
Carl Wilhelm Hilchenbach	1782–1816
Johann Friedrich Schobinger	1789–1790
Carl Cleynmann	1794–1815
Justus Hausknecht	1816–1834
Carl Wilhelm Faesi	1817–1829
Gottfried Franz	1829–1873
Hermann Theodor Ernst	1836–1861
Cornelius August Wilkens	1861–1879
Carl Alphons Witz	1874–1918
Friedrich Otto Schack	1880–1922
Gustav Zwernemann	1913–1946
Johann Karl Egli	1927–1952
Hermann Noltensmeier	1946–1963
Hermann Rippel	1956–1963
Alexander Abrahamowicz	1957–1990
Peter Karner	1965–2004
Erwin Liebert	1990–1995
Johannes Langhoff	1997–2017
Harald Kluge	seit 2005
Réka Juhász	seit 2017

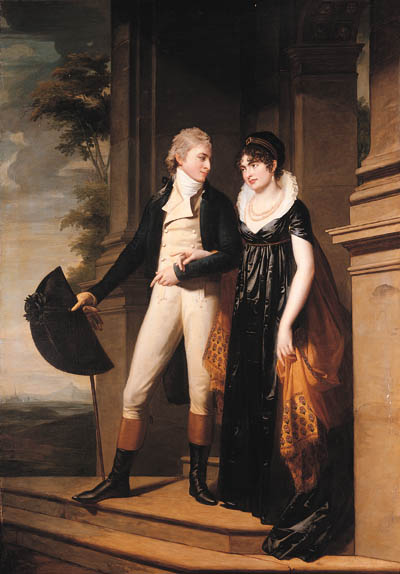
Head of the municipality Moritz von Fries and his wife Maria Theresia Josepha. Painting by Jean-Laurent Mosnier (around 1801)

Since 1789, the Reformed City Church has typically employed two pastors simultaneously. Notable pastors who have served in this capacity include Carl Wilhelm Hilchenbach, Justus Hausknecht, Gottfried Franz, Friedrich Otto Schack, Gustav Zwernemann, Johann Karl Egli, and Peter Karner, many of whom also held the position of (provincial) superintendents in the Protestant Church of H.B. in Austria. Hermann Rippel served as the military superintendent for the Evangelical Church A. u. H.B. in Austria. Currently, Harald Kluge has been serving at the Reformed City Church since 2005, with Pastor Réka Juhász joining in 2017.

In 1861, a presbytery, chaired by a curator, replaced the college of rectors at the Reformed City Church. Two Swiss naturalists played significant roles in shaping parish life as curators up until the First World War. Johann Jakob von Tschudi served as curator from 1874 to 1883, overseeing preparations for the 1887 reconstruction. His successor, Karl Brunner-von Wattenwyl, held the position from 1884 to 1914, completing the project. From the late 19th century, several members of the Rhenish Schoeller family were active in church leadership. Alexander von Schoeller was among the first, serving as rector in 1851 and later as a presbyter from 1862. He was followed by Gustav Adolph von Schoeller in 1867 and Philipp von Schoeller, who held the position from 1889 to 1915. Paul Eduard von Schoeller was elected to the presbytery in 1919.

From 2005 to 2017, Peter Duschet, a specialist in skin and venereal diseases, served as trustee of the community. Gabriele Jandrasits was curator from 2017 until 2023, with Norbert Chytil assuming the role in October 2023.

== Architecture ==
=== Location and floor plan ===
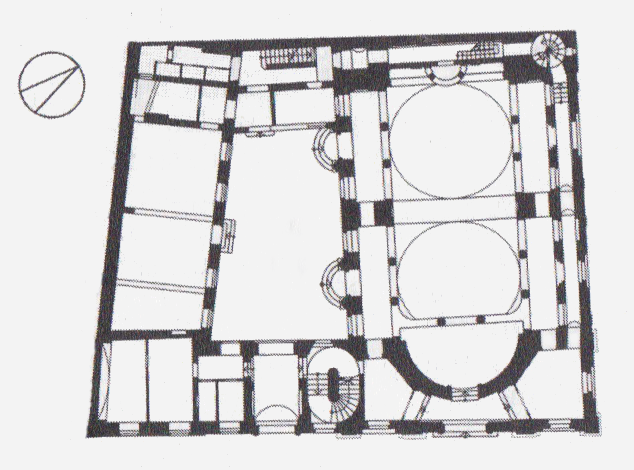
Floor plan: the main church hall on the right, the rectory on the left

The Reformed City Church is located at Dorotheergasse 16, in the district between Graben and the Hofburg. The complex consists of the church building and the adjacent vicarage to the south, connected by two side wings that enclose a trapezoidal inner courtyard. The site is bordered to the west by Friesian tenement houses and to the south by the Lutheran City Church. The main façade of the church and vicarage faces Dorotheergasse, while the northern façade of the church runs along Stallburggasse. Plankengasse creates a visual axis between the church tower and the Donnerbrunnen at Neuer Markt.

=== Exterior ===
The main façade of the Reformed City Church, designed in a neo-Baroque style, features two distinct zones. The main zone is marked by Ionic giant pilasters and a central portal with a metal gate. The windows are framed in the neo-Baroque style. Above the portal axis, a segmental gable is attached to the central risalit, topped by a broken triangular pediment. A vase balustrade connects to the Tuscan corner pilasters. The tower reaches a height of 42 meters, with brickwork extending up to 30 meters. At its top, above a kinked gable, sits a tall lantern dome, covered in copper.

The side façade facing the courtyard retains early neoclassical elements, while the side facing Stallburggasse was remodeled in 1887 to reflect this style. Both façades feature large thermal windows, and the Stallburggasse façade is further structured with wall panels. A small metal door here resembles the main gate from 1887 but is distinct from the Henriettentor built in 1815, which has since been removed. On the outer wall facing the inner courtyard, two former main entrances, framed by Tuscan half-columns and a straight entablature, can be found. Above these former main entrances is a circular memorial plaque dedicated to Emperor Joseph II, with Latin text based on a design by Göttinger Professor Christian Gottlob Heyne.

Memorial plaque above the old main entrances
Image of the original inscription	Latin translation	English translation
Deo optimo maximo sanctissimo imperatore Iosepho II. annuente amor fratrum faciendum curavit MDCCLXXXIIII		The love of the brothers built this house for the best, greatest, holiest God under the favorable approval of Emperor Joseph II. 1784.

=== Interior ===
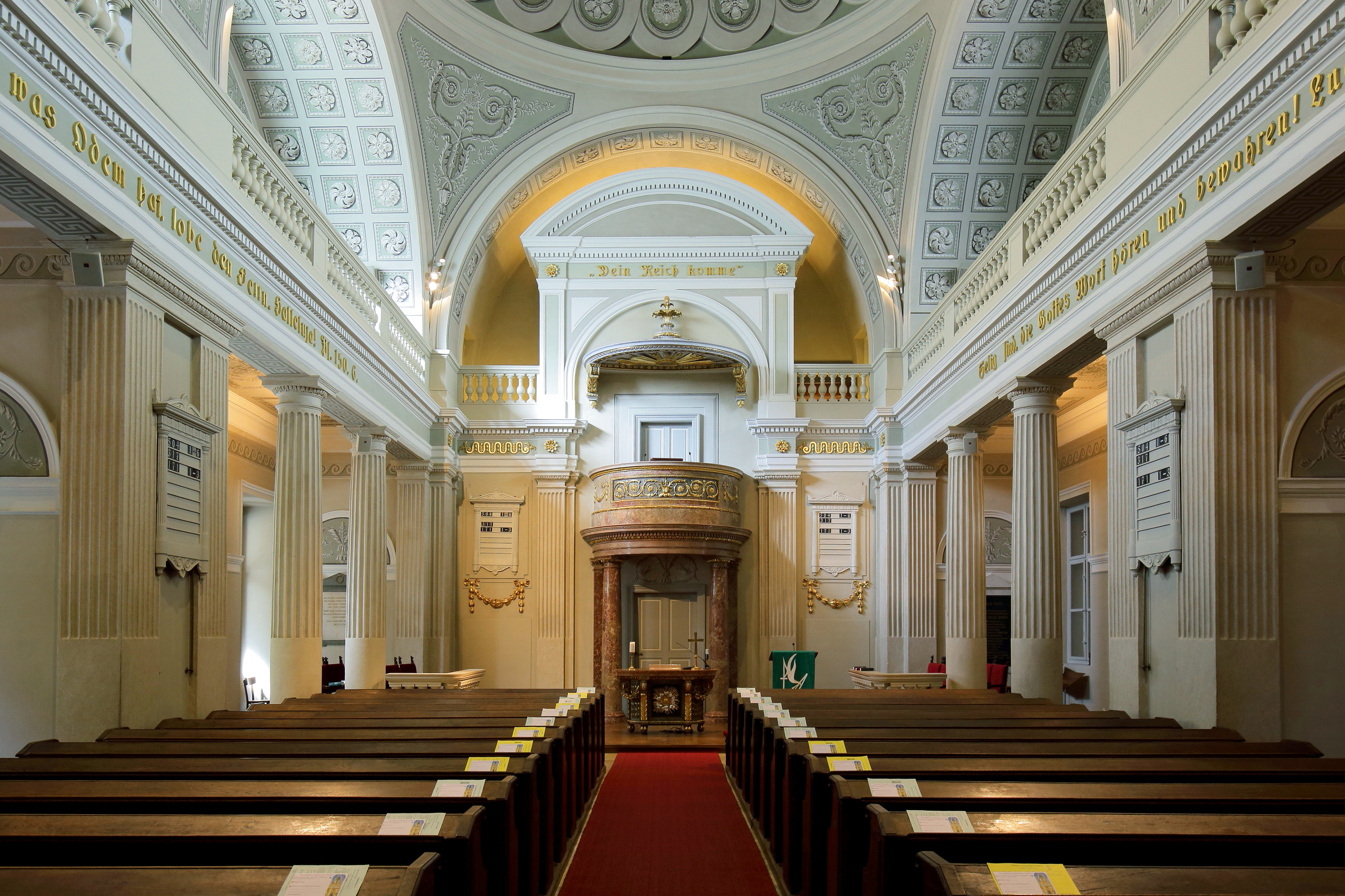
Inside view of the Reformed City Church

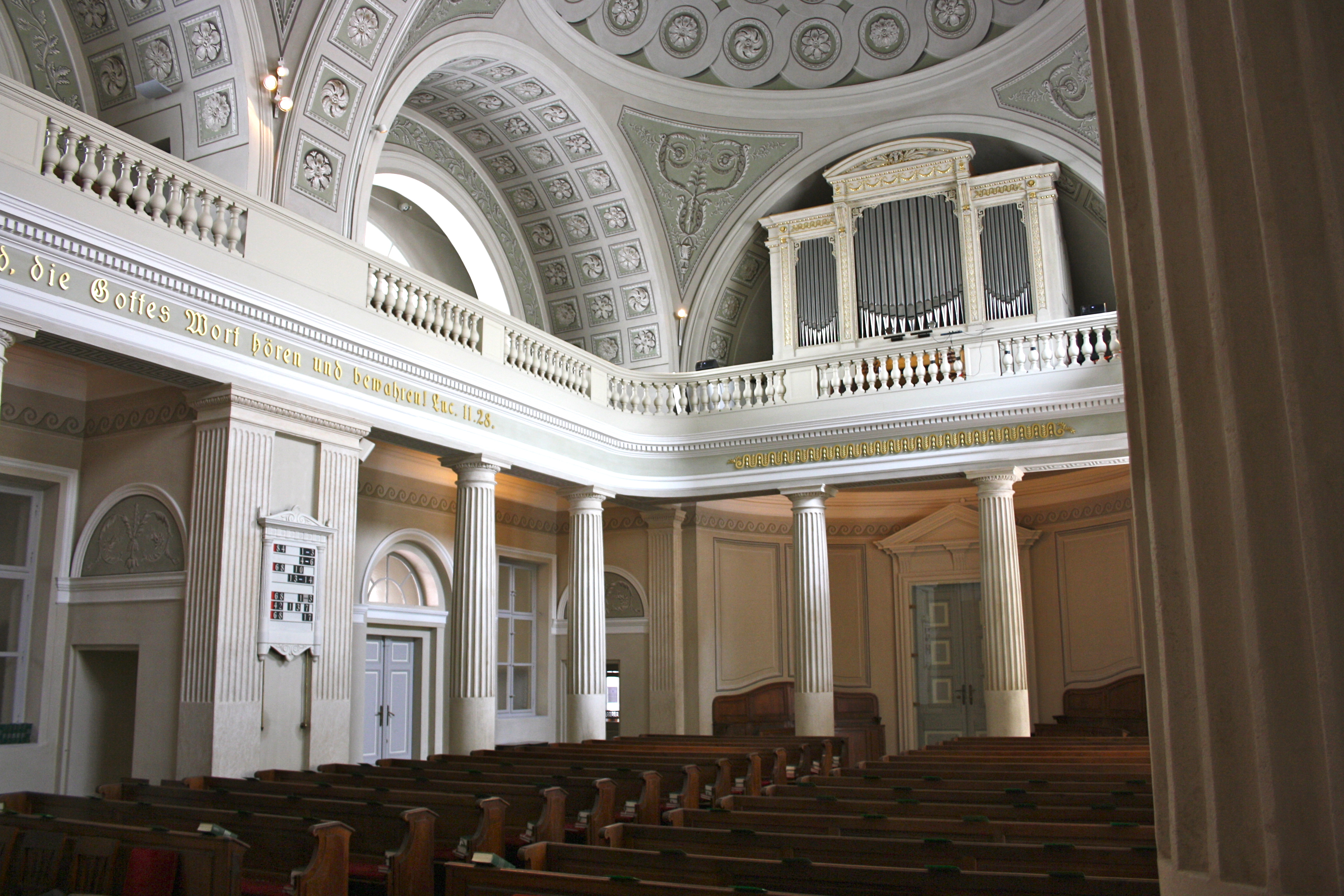
Interior of the Reformed City Church

The Reformed City Church is noted as a significant example of neoclassical architecture in Vienna. The basic structure is a two-bay wall pillar church with two flat pendentive domes, above which there is a roof truss. The former semi-circular apse has been pierced by the inner main portal, which features a triangular gable since the conversion of 1887. The organ loft is located above this portal.

On both long sides, the organ loft continues into lateral galleries, each with two barrel vaults and thermal windows on both sides of the wall pillars. The balustraded galleries are supported by a total of ten Tuscan columns. The two wall pillars, decorated with Tuscan pilasters, are each pierced by passages on the ground floor and gallery levels. The narrow side with the pulpit is designed as a triumphal arch, featuring a basket arch within which is a segmental arch aedicula that houses the pulpit and layered Tuscan pilasters.

In front of the main room on the long side facing Stallburggasse is a corridor, at the end of which a spiral staircase leads to the galleries. A vestibule separates the inner and outer main doors facing Dorotheergasse. There are side entrances to the main room on both sides of the inner main portal. Following the 1887 renovation, these side entrances were intended to allow separate access to the church for men and women, reserving the inner main portal for high feast days, blessings, and funerals. Two further side gates, formerly the main portals, connect the church directly to the inner courtyard.

The interior of the church is characterized by a lack of images and crosses, reflecting a strict adherence to the Second Commandment in the Reformed tradition. Grisaille wall paintings mimic stucco with rosettes and acanthus motifs. The pictorial design of the domes à l'antica, resembling the Paris Pantheón, shows the influence of French classicism on architect Gottlieb Nigelli, who studied in Paris.

Three wall inscriptions in gold lettering, donated by the Wittgenstein family in 1889, feature biblical quotations: "Thy kingdom come" is positioned above the pulpit, while the undersides of the side galleries display "All that breathes praise the Lord, hallelujah! Ps. 150:6" and "Blessed are those who hear and keep the word of God. Luke 11:28."

There are four memorial plaques on the walls near the pulpit and communion table. The oldest plaque, dated 1822, honors Pastor Carl Wilhelm Hilchenbach, described as "the faithful promoter of this building, the pious leader of our souls, the teacher of our youth, the father of our poor." Another plaque commemorates the reconstruction of 1887 and several people involved in it, including architect Ignaz Sowinski. A marble plaque from 1925 honors the parishioners who died in World War I and contains an exhortation to peace, with its text written by theology professor Josef Bohatec.

The most recent memorial plaque dates from 2005 and names Zsigmond Varga and Ernst and Gisela Pollack as representatives of the church members murdered in the concentration camps of the National Socialists. Zsigmond Varga († 1945 in Gusen concentration camp) was a pastor of the Reformed Hungarians in Vienna. Ernst and Gisela Pollack († 1942 in Theresienstadt concentration camp) were benefactors of the congregation.

=== Rectory ===
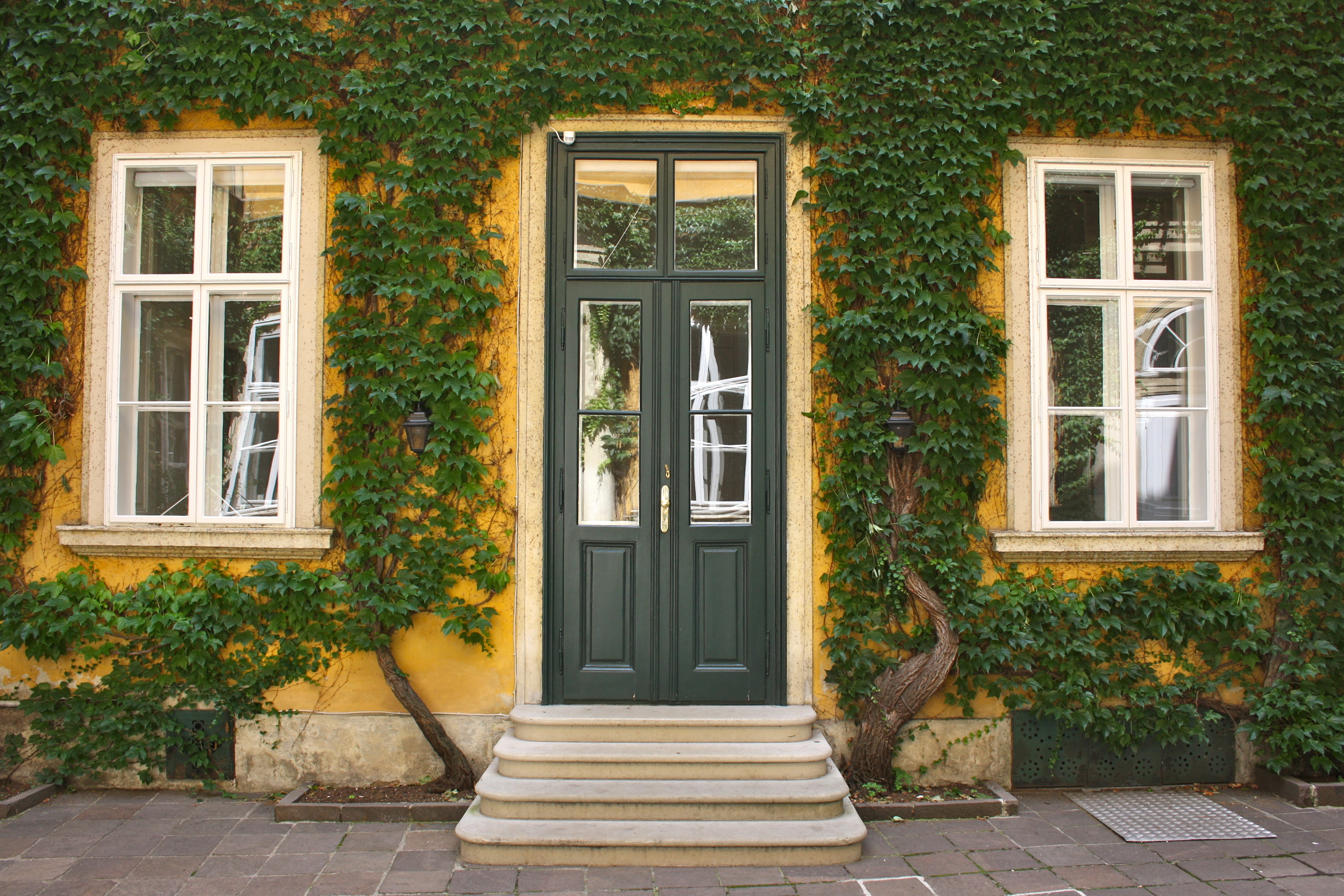
Courtyard entrance to the parish hall in the rectory

The Reformed City Church's rectory is a three-storey early classicist building, featuring a street façade that faces Dorotheergasse, as well as courtyard façades. The left side of the street façade is distinguished by a biaxial side risalit. The windows are adorned with volute consoles and window parapets, while recessed wall bays extend across both upper floors. Meander friezes are present below the windows on the first floor. The street portal of the rectory has recently been condemned, and its original wooden door is decorated with festoons. On the west side of the inner courtyard, there is a two-storey loggia with round arch arcades.

The entrance from Dorotheergasse into the inner courtyard features coffered wall pillars and a barrel vault. The ground floor houses the parish hall, the sexton's apartment, and the sacristy. The first floor contains offices for the parish and the church as a whole. There is an exposed door frame here, which is a remnant of the royal monastery from the end of the 16th century. On the second floor, there is a vicar's apartment. The attic of the rectory dates from the end of the 18th century. The rectory has a two-storey deep cellar. Two street-facing rooms in the lower basement feature cross-ridge vaulting and stitch-cap barrel vaulting, the ridges of which are heavily plastered.

== Furnishings and equipment ==
=== Pulpit, communion table, and pews ===
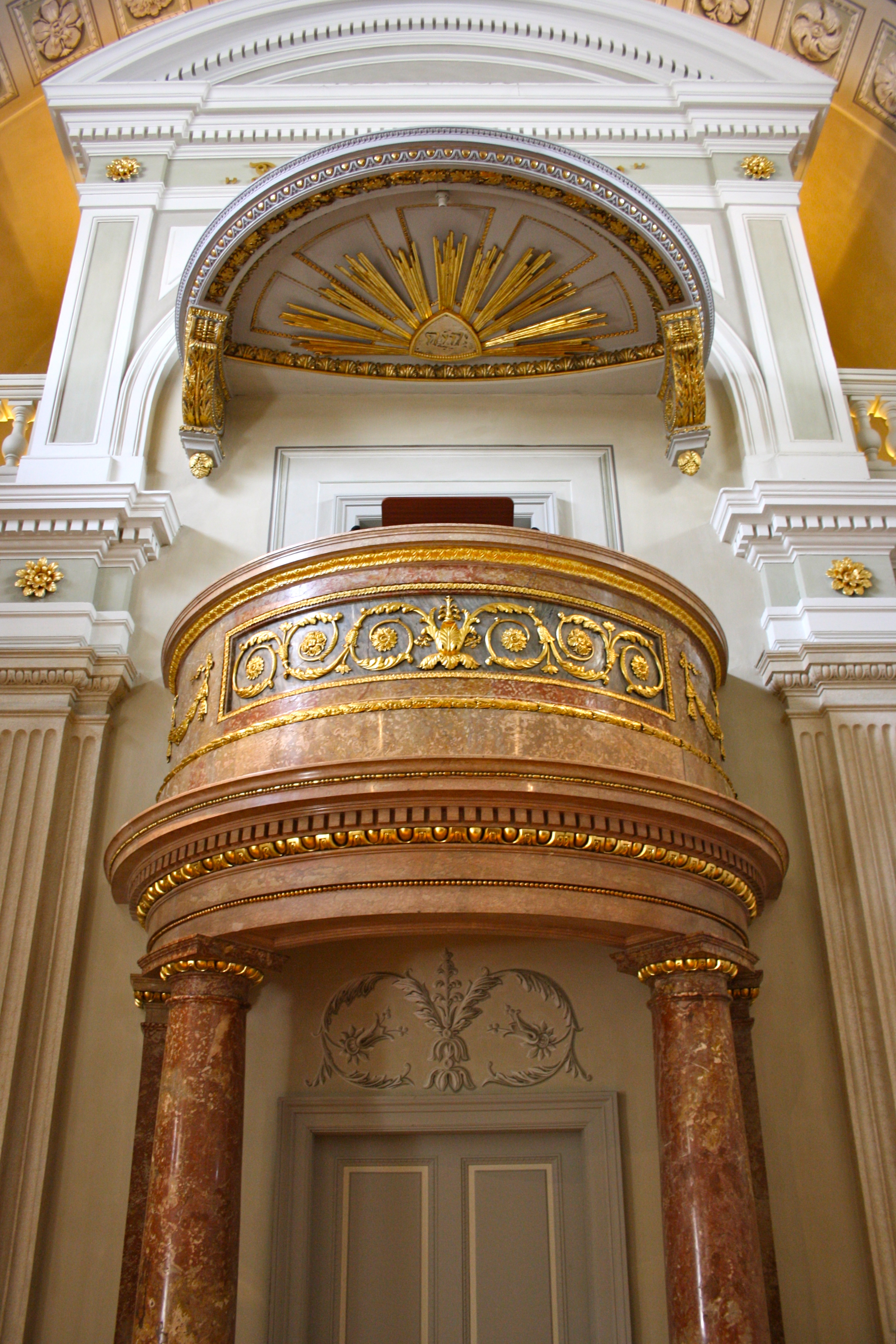
Pulpit of the Reformed City Church

The position of the pulpit in the center of the wall, facing the pews, identifies the Reformed City Church as a preaching church, with the sermon at the center of the service. The semi-circular, early classicist pulpit dates from 1774 and stands on Tuscan columns and pilasters made of reddish marble, adorned with gilded acanthus ornaments. The sounding board features a halo of rays surrounding the Tetragram on its underside.

The communion table below the pulpit is a wooden table topped with reddish marble, decorated with gilded festoons and volute consoles. According to tradition, this communion table was assembled from parts of an altar from the former Kamaldulenserkirche am Kahlenberg. During the Coalition Wars in 1810, the state confiscated all of the parish's church silver and used it as a contribution to France. The newly acquired communion tableware, made of fire-gilt silver, is hallmarked with the year 1807 and consists of a wine jug, two goblets, and a bread plate.

The wooden pews and presbyters' chairs date from 1784. In accordance with the Reformed tradition, which does not allow for kneeling in worship, the pews lack kneeling benches. Under the pews, there are slabs of Kelheim limestone. The presbyter's chairs, intended for the members of the presbytery, are positioned on either side of the communion table and are separated from the rest of the church by freely positioned balustrades.

=== Bells ===
The three church tower bells, made by the Grassmayr Bell Foundry in 1979, are tuned in the minor triad G-sharp–B-sharp. They bear the following inscriptions:

- Post tenebras lux
- I am not ashamed of the gospel of Christ, for it is the power of God for salvation to everyone who believes in it
- Si Deus pro nobis, quis contra nos

=== Organ ===
The first organ in the Reformed City Church was built in 1695, presumably sourced from an abandoned monastery, and was likely adapted by the Viennese organ builder Franz Xaver Christoph. It was replaced in 1901 by a new organ donated to Cilli by the Dresden organ builder Johannes Jahn. The Jahn organ, which was last renovated in 1929, could not be fundamentally repaired after the Second World War due to a lack of funds, ultimately falling into a desolate condition. Additionally, its console was unfavorably located on a narrow side due to spatial constraints. The next organ was built by the Viennese organ builder Herbert Gollini in 1974. Gollini retained the neoclassical case of the Jahn organ and continued to use its pipes. The Gollini organ is a mechanical slider chest organ with 25 stops, distributed over two manuals and pedals.

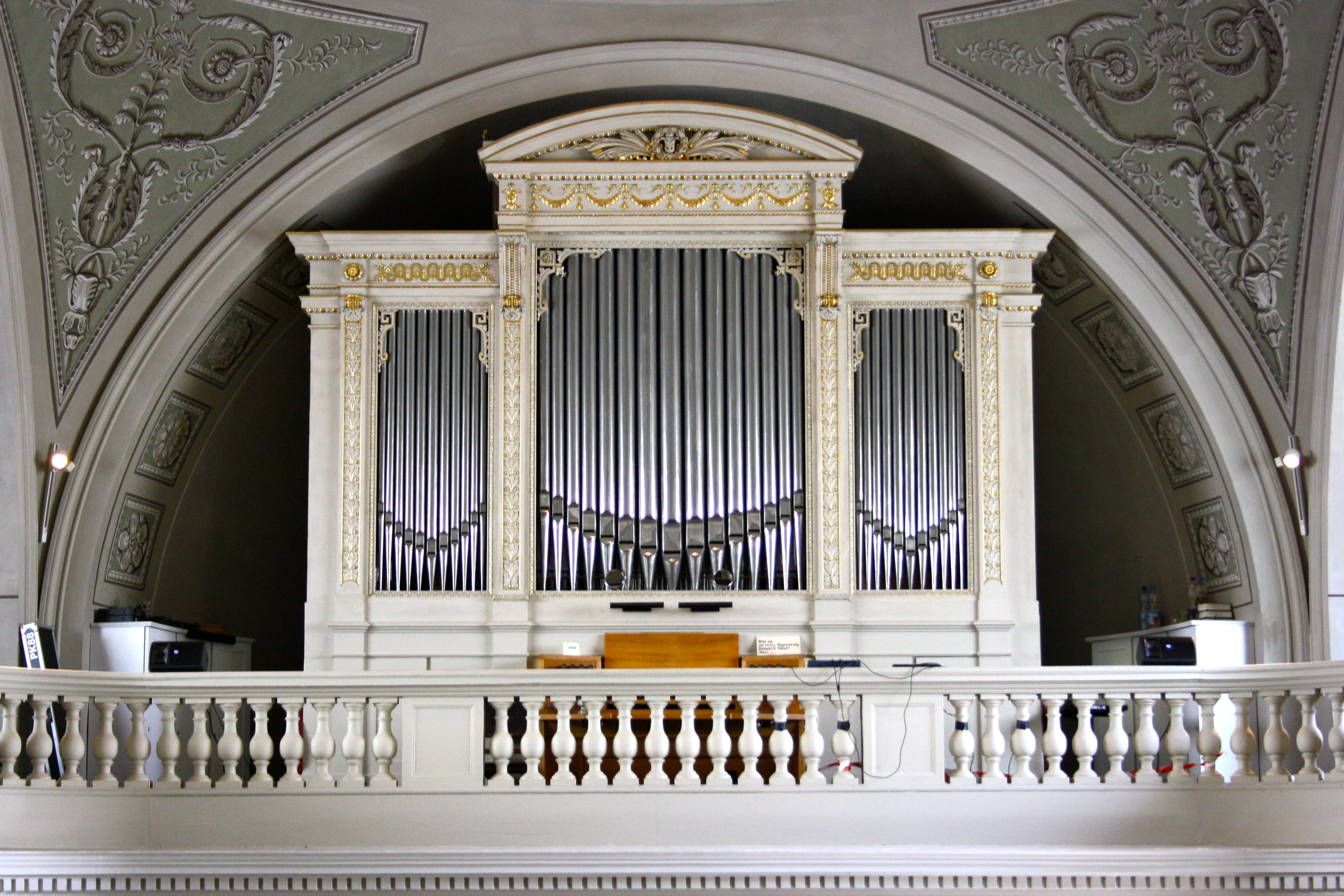
Gollini organ in the Reformed City Church

Its Disposition reads:

I Main work C–g^{3}
1.	Drone	16′
2.	Principal	8′
3.	Reed flute	8′
4.	Octave	4′
5.	Pointed flute	4′
6.	Fifth
7.	Octave	2′
8.	Mixture IV–VI
9.	Trumpet	8′

II Swell unit C–g^{3}
10.	Pedal	8′
11.	Principal	4′
12.	Flute	4′
13.	Gemshorn	2′
14.	Nasard
15.	Sesquialter II
16.	Scharff III–IV
17.	Crumhorn	8′

Pedal C–f^{1}
18.	Sub-bass	16′
19.	Octave bass	8′
20.	Covered bass	8′
21.	Choral bass	4′
22.	Mixture III
23.	Bassoon	16′
24.	Trumpet	8′
25.	Shawl	4′

- Couplers: three standard couplers
- Playing aids: Coupling, swell step

Among the personalities who served as organists at the Reformed City Church were Wilhelm Karl Rust (active 1819–1827), Ignaz Lachner (active 1827–1831), Benedict Randhartinger (active 1831–1835), Gottfried Preyer (active 1835–1841), and Eugen Gmeiner (active 1949–1956).

== Literature ==
- Peter Karner, ed. (1986), Die evangelische Gemeinde H. B. in Wien, Forschungen und Beiträge zur Wiener Stadtgeschichte, 16, Wien: Franz Deuticke, ISBN 3-7005-4579-7
- Die evangelische Kirche in der Dorotheergasse. In: Wiener Bauindustrie-Zeitung/Österreichische Bauzeitung, Year 1887, p. 66 (Online bei ANNO)
- Der Umbau des Kirchen- und Pfarrgebäudes der Evangelischen Gemeinde Helvetischer Konfession in Wien. In: Allgemeine Bauzeitung, Year 1893, p. 87–88 (Online bei ANNO)
