= Violin Sonata No. 4 (Beethoven) =

Piece for violin and piano by Beethonven

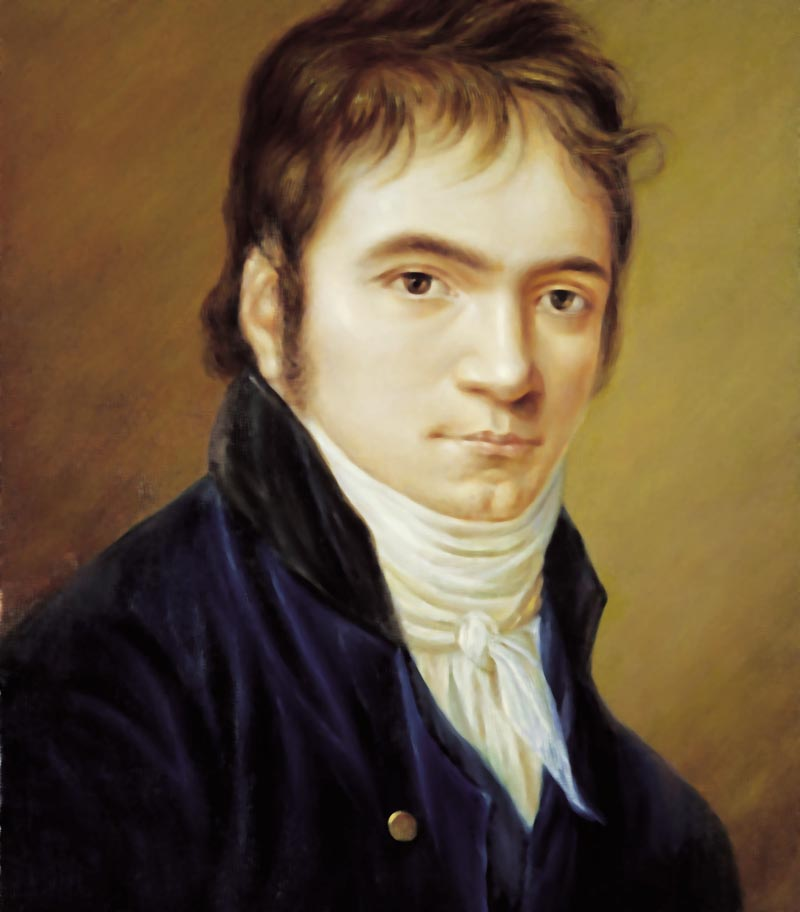
Ludwig van Beethoven in 1803

The Violin Sonata No. 4 in A minor, Op. 23 is a three-movement work for violin and piano composed by Ludwig van Beethoven in 1801. It was published in October that year, and dedicated to Count Moritz von Fries. It followed by one year the composition of his first symphony, and was originally meant to be published alongside Violin Sonata No. 5, however it was published on different sized paper, so the opus numbers had to be split. Unlike the three first sonatas, Sonata No. 4 received a favourable reception from critics.

It has three movements:

1. Presto (in A minor)
2. Andante scherzoso, più allegretto (in A major)
3. Allegro molto (also in A minor)

The work takes approximately 19 minutes to perform.

== Sources ==
- Cady, Arielle E. (2011). Performance Analysis of Beethoven's Violin Sonata, Op. 23: Freedom of Interpretation in Passages of Formal Anomaly (Thesis). Andrews University.
- Heeney, Eimear (2007). Beethoven's Works for Violin and Piano (PDF) (M.A.). Waterford Institute of Technology. Archived from the original (PDF) on 2017-10-30.
