= Charles Frye =

Charles Frye could refer to:

- Charlie Frye (born 1981), American football player and coach
- Charlie Frye (baseball) (1913–1945), American Major League Baseball pitcher

== See also ==
- Charles Fried (born 1935), American jurist and lawyer
- Charles Fries (disambiguation)
- Charles Fry (disambiguation)
