= Daniel Steibelt =

German pianist and composer

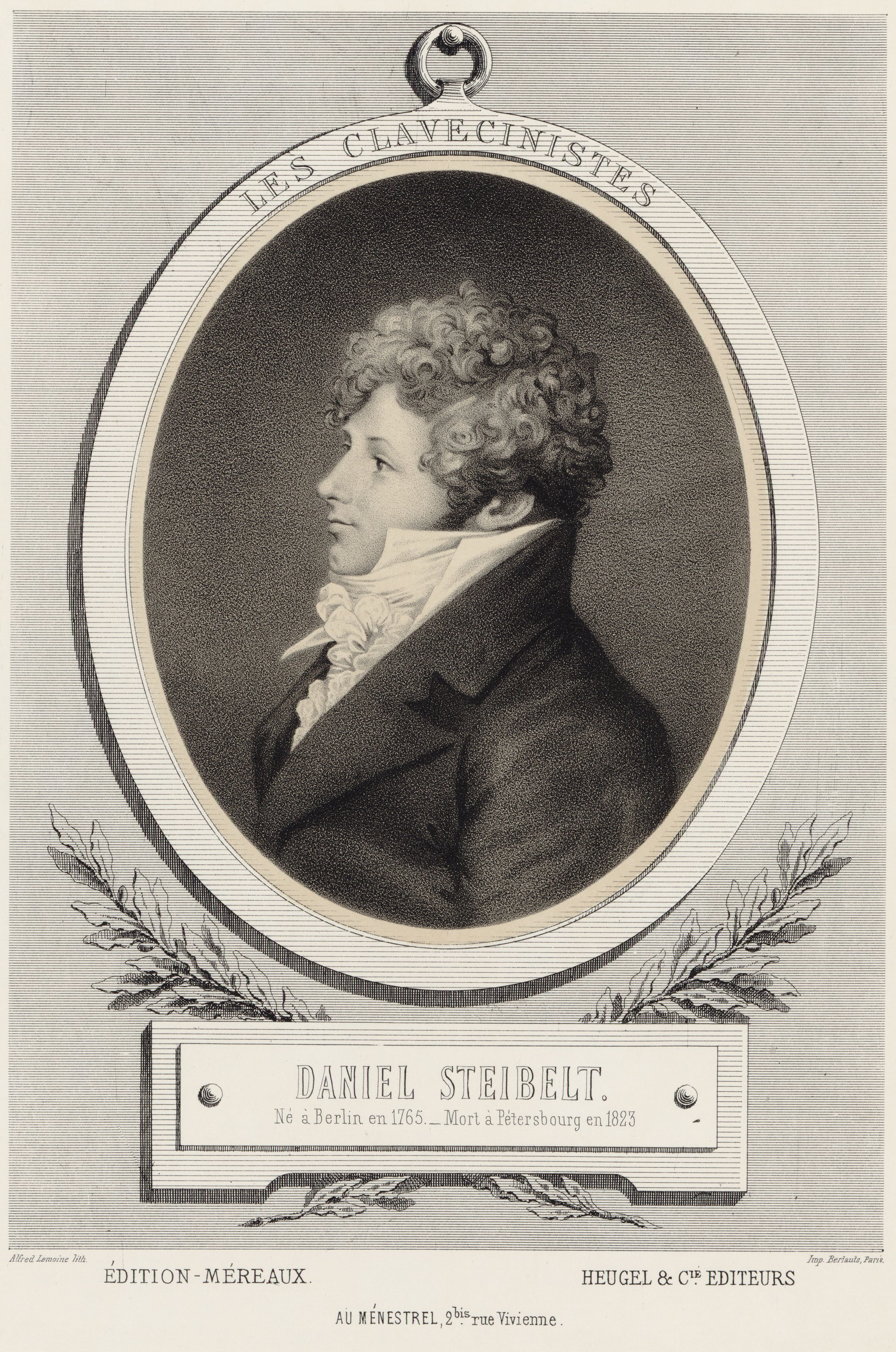
Daniel Steibelt

Daniel Gottlieb Steibelt (22 October 1765 – 2 October [O.S. 20 September] 1823) was a German pianist and composer. His main works were composed in Paris and in London, and he died in Saint Petersburg, Russia. He once challenged and lost to Ludwig van Beethoven in a piano duel.

== Biography ==
Steibelt was born in Berlin, and studied music with Johann Kirnberger before being forced by his father to join the Prussian Army. After deserting, he began a nomadic career as a pianist before settling in 1790 in Paris, where he attained great popularity as a virtuoso as the result of a piano sonata called La Coquette, which he composed for Marie Antoinette. Also in Paris, his dramatic opera entitled Romeo et Juliette, which was later highly regarded by Hector Berlioz, was produced at the Théâtre Feydeau in 1793. This is held by many to be his most original and artistically successful composition.

Steibelt began to share his time between Paris and London, where his piano playing attracted great attention. In 1797 he played in a concert of J. P. Salomon. In 1798 he produced his Concerto No. 3 in E containing a Storm Rondo characterized by extensive tremolos, which became very popular. In the following year Steibelt started on a professional tour in Germany; and, after playing with some success in Hamburg, Berlin, Dresden, and Prague, he arrived at the end of March 1800 at Vienna, where he is reported to have challenged Beethoven to a trial of skill at the house of Count Moritz von Fries. The oft-quoted account by Ferdinand Ries was written 37 years later; Ries did not attend it and became only later a student and friend of Beethoven. The duel between Steibelt and Beethoven consisted of multiple rounds as different assessments of each player's skill. The first round was a prepared playing of someone else's composition. For this Beethoven played a Mozart composition, and Steibelt performed a Haydn piece. The next round of competition involved each player improvising over a theme supplied by their opponent. According to Ries, Beethoven won the first two rounds with ease. The third and final round secured Beethoven's victory. Each player was to sightread a newly written piece from their opponent. Steibelt was given Beethoven's Piano Sonata in B♭ Major, Op. 22, which did earn him some considerable applause. However, Steibelt proceeded to bend the rules and handed Beethoven a Sonata for Cello and Piano instead of just a Piano composition. This did not faze Beethoven at all, as he simply took the score, placed it upside down, and read it backward. He then began improvising on the inversed themes for about 30 minutes, causing Steibelt to furiously storm out before Beethoven had finished. Ries stated that Steibelt had "made it a condition that Beethoven was not to be invited where his own company was desired".

Following this supposed public humiliation Steibelt ended his tour. (The date of his departure from Vienna is not known, while Beethoven did leave Vienna at the end of April or the beginning of May: he played in Buda, Hungary, on 7 May.) Steibelt went again to Paris, where he organized the first performance of Joseph Haydn's oratorio The Creation, which took place on 24 December 1800 at the Opera House. On his way to it, Napoleon Bonaparte narrowly escaped a bomb attack. Steibelt had just published one of his most accomplished sonatas, which he had dedicated to Bonaparte's wife, Josephine. After a second stay in England from March 1802 to March 1805, Steibelt returned to the continent, gave concerts in Brussels (April 1805), and was back in Paris in Summer. He celebrated Napoleon's triumph at Austerlitz with a Musical Interlude named La Fête de Mars, whose première was attended by Napoleon in person (4 February 1806).

In 1808 he was invited by Tsar Alexander I to Saint Petersburg, succeeding François-Adrien Boieldieu as director of the French Opera in 1811. He remained there for the rest of his life. In 1812, he composed The Conflagration of Moscow, a grand fantasy for piano dedicated to the Russian nation. Steibelt generally ceased performing in 1814 but returned to the platform for his Concerto No. 8, which premiered on March 16, 1820, in Saint Petersburg, and is notable for its choral finale. This was four years before Beethoven's unconventional Symphony No. 9 and was the only piano concerto ever written (excluding Beethoven's Choral Fantasy) with a part for a chorus until Henri Herz's 6th concerto, Op. 192 (1858) and Ferruccio Busoni's Piano Concerto (1904). Steibelt died in Saint Petersburg on 20 September 1823 (2 October N.S.), following a prolonged illness.

== Legacy ==
Besides his dramatic music, Steibelt left behind him an enormous number of compositions, mostly for the piano. His playing was said to be brilliant, though lacking the higher qualities which characterized that of such contemporaries as Cramer and Muzio Clementi. Despite this, his playing and compositional skills enabled him to build a career across Europe. On his personal character Grove describes him as "eaten up with vanity, which exhibited itself unceasingly in arrogance, incivility, and affectation [and with] a reckless extravagance in money matters that amounted to criminality".

== Selected list of his works ==
1) Stage

- Romeo et Juliette, 3 acts (1793)
- Albert et Adelaide, 3 acts (1798)
- Le retour de Zephyr, 1 act ballet (1802)
- Le jugement du Berger, 3 acts ballet (1804)
- La Belle Laitière, ou Blanche Reine de Castille (1805)
- La Fête de Mars, intermezzo (1806)
- La Fête de l'Empereur, ballet (1809)
- Der Blöde Ritter (1810)
- Sargines, 3 acts, opera (1810) (This is most likely not a work by Steibelt.)
- Cendrillon, 3 acts opera (1810)
- La Princesse de Babylone, 3 acts opera (1812)
- Le jugement de Midas (1823?)

2) Orchestral

- Concerto No. 1 for Piano and Orchestra in C (Paris edition in 1794)
- Concerto No. 2 for Piano and Orchestra in E minor (1796?)
- Concerto No. 3 for Piano and Orchestra in E "L'orage" (created in 1798; Paris ed. 1799)
- Concerto No. 4 for Piano (or Harp) and Orchestra in E♭ (1800?)
- Concerto No. 5 for Piano and Orchestra in E♭ "À la chasse" Op. 64 (created in 1802; Paris ed. 1805)
- Concerto No. 6 for Piano and Orchestra in G minor "Le voyage au mont Saint-Bernard" (Paris edition 1817)
- Concerto No. 7 for Piano and Orchestra in E minor "Grand concerto militaire dans le genre grec", with 2 orchestras, (Paris ed. 1818)
- Concerto No. 8 for Piano and Orchestra in E♭ "with bacchanalian rondo, acc. chorus" (1820), not published.
- Harp Concerto (1807)
- Ouverture en Symphonie (1796)
- Marches and Waltzes

3) Chamber

- Rondo favorite, for violin or flute, and guitar
- 3 String Quartets, Op. 17 (1796)
- 3 Quintets for Piano and Strings, Op. 28 (1797)
- 6 String Quartets, op. 34 (ca 1799)
- 3 Duos for Violin and Guitar, Op. 37
- 3 String Quartets, Op. 49 (1800)
- 3 Violin Sonatas, Op. 69
- 1 Quartet for Piano and Strings
- 26 trios for piano and strings
- 6 trios for harp and strings
- 115 duos for piano and violin (?)
- 6 duos for Piano and Harp (or for two pianos)
- 6 sonatas for harp
- 36 bacchanals and 12 divertissements for Piano, tambourine and triangle ad lib.
- 77 sonatas for piano solo
- 45 rondos
- 32 fantasias
- 21 divertissements
- 12 caprices or preludes
- 20 pots-pourris
- 2 series of serenades
- 25 series of variations
- 16 sonatas for piano 4 hands (at least 6 of them are apocryphal works)
- Descriptive pieces (Triumph, sieges, marches funebres ... )
- Waltzes, danses.
- Studies, Op. 78

4) Methode de Pianoforte (1805)

5) Songs

- 6 romances (1798)
- Air d'Estelle (1798)
- 30 songs, Op. 10 (1794)

== Selective discography ==
- Variations on two Russian Folksongs, Irina Ermakova, piano (Arte Nova ANO 516260, 1996)
- Sonata in E major, Hiroko Sakagami, piano (Hans Georg Nägeli, publisher and composer, MGB CD 6193, 2002)
- Grand Sonata in E-flat major, dedicated to Madame Bonaparte, Daniel Propper, piano (Echoes of the Battlefields, Forgotten Records, fr 16/17P, 2012)
- The Conflagration of Moscow, a grand fantasia, Daniel Propper, piano (Echoes of the Battlefields, Forgotten Records, fr 16/17P, 2012)
- Grand concerto for harp, Masumi Nagasawa, harpe, Kölner Akademie, dir. Michael Alexander Willens (Ars Produktion, ARS 38 108, 2012)
- Sonata in C minor, Op. 6 No. 2, Anna Petrova-Forster, piano (Gega New, GD 362, 2013)
- Etudes, Op. 78 (Nos. 50, 32 and 3), Anna Petrova-Forster, piano (Gega New, GD 362, 2013)
- Sonata in D major, Op. 82, Anna Petrova-Forster, piano (Gega New, GD 362, 2013)
- Concerto in G minor, No. 6, Le voyage au Mont St. Bernard, Anna Petrova-Forster, solo piano without orchestra (Gega New, GD 362, 2013)
- Rondo The Storm, from his Concerto No. 3, Anna Petrova-Forster, piano (Forgotten Records, fr 32P, 2015)
- Rondo Les Papillons, Anna Petrova-Forster, piano (Forgotten Records, fr 32P, 2015)
- Fantaisie and Variations on two Russian themes, Anna Petrova-Forster (Forgotten Records, fr 32P, 2015)
- Sonata in G major, Op. 64, Anna Petrova-Forster (Forgotten Records, fr 32P, 2015)
- Etudes op.78, Nos. 10, 11, 24, 26, 30, 31, 33, Anna Petrova-Forster, piano (Toccata Classics, TOCN0005, 2021)
