= Charles Fry (disambiguation) =

Charles Fry could refer to:

- C. B. Fry (Charles Burgess Fry, 1872–1956), English cricketer and journalist
- Charles Fry (1940–2024), English cricketer and grandson of C. B. Fry
- Charlie Fry, Australian rules footballer
- Charles M. Fry (1822–1892), American banker

== See also ==
- Charles Fried (born 1935), American jurist and lawyer
- Charles Fries (disambiguation)
- Charles Frye (disambiguation)
