= Charles Fries =

Charles Fries may refer to:

- Charles Fries (producer) (born 1928), American film and television producer
- Charles Arthur Fries (1854–1940), American painter
- Charles Fries (diplomat) (born 1952), French diplomat
- Charles Carpenter Fries (1887–1967), American linguist and language teacher

== See also ==
- Charles Fried (born 1935), American jurist and lawyer
- Charles Fry (disambiguation)
- Charles Frye (disambiguation)
