= Ignaz Sowinski =

Austrian architect

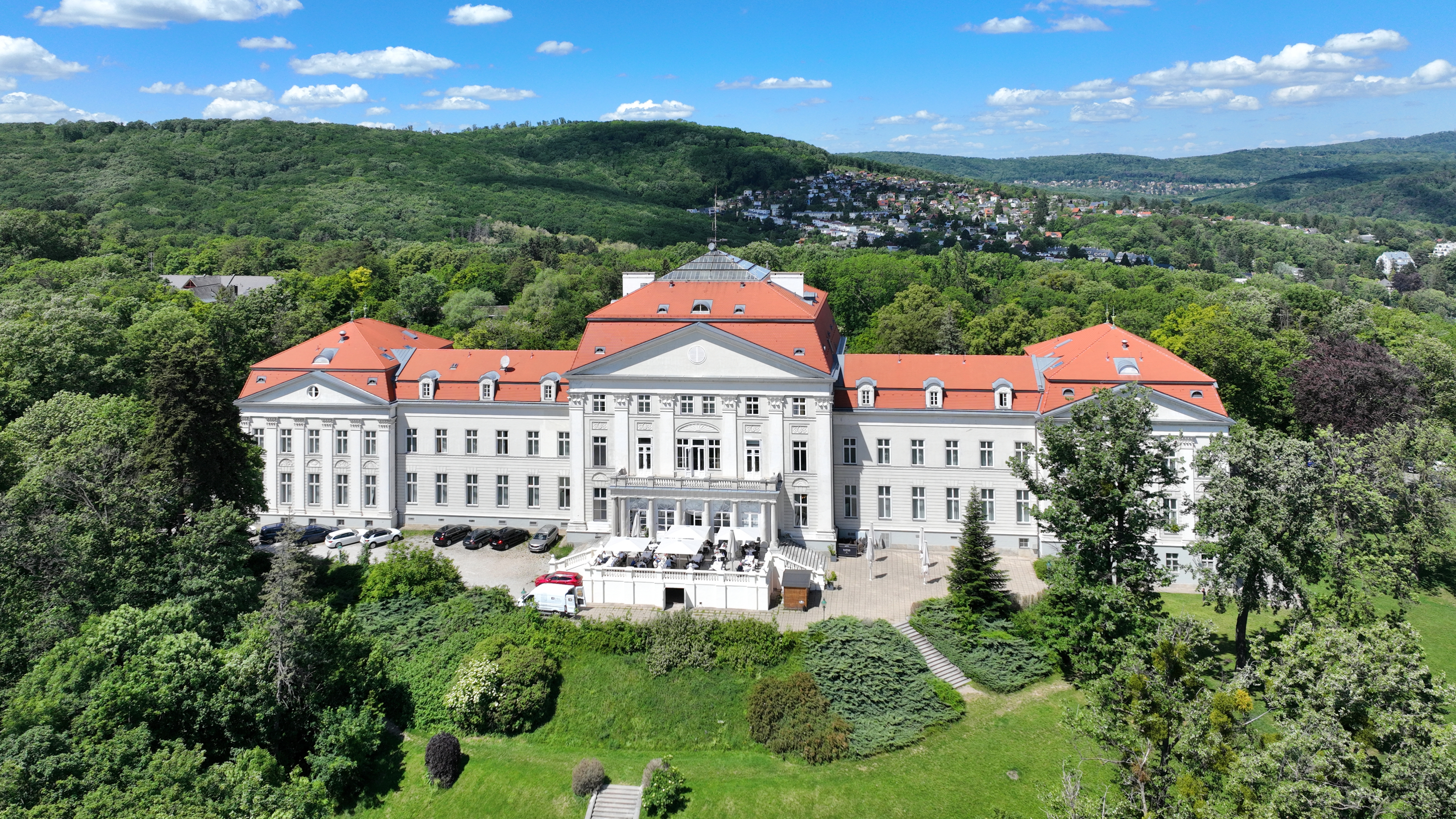
- Wilhelminenberg Castle
- Born: 30 August 1858; Kraków, Austrian Poland
- Died: 20 July 1917 (aged 58); Kraków, Poland
- Education: TU Wien
- Occupation: Architect
- Spouse: Barbara Pammer
- Buildings: Wilhelminenberg Castle

Ignaz Stanislaus Sowinski (Polish: Ignacy Stanisław Sowiński; 1858–1917) was a Polish architect and journalist who was active in Galicia from the middle of the 1880s and until the outbreak of World War I.

== Life ==
Sowinski was born on 30 August 1858 in Kraków, Galicia, in what was then Austrian Poland.

Between 1876 and 1881 he studied at TU Wien in Vienna under Heinrich von Ferstel and Karl König.

From around 1881, he was active as a freelance architect in Vienna where he opened his own studio and occasionally also worked as a journalist.

His spectrum ranged from rental houses and villas to factories. One of his most spectacular commissions was the construction of the Wilhelminenberg Castle in Vienna (1903/08). He was also active in other regions of the Habsburg monarchy, especially in his native Kraków. From September 1913, he took part in the restoration work of the Wawel Castle in Kraków and was appointed head of the company in July 1914. After the outbreak of World War I in the autumn of that year, he left Kraków again and returned to Vienna. After some of his designs had been rejected by the renovation committee, he put off his assignment in February 1916. A little over a year later, on 20 July 1917, he died in Kraków and was buried in the Rakowicki Cemetery.

=== Personal life ===
In 1889 he married Barbara Pammer (1860-1901). They had no children.

== See also ==
- Lutheran City Church
