= Symphony No. 7 (Beethoven) =

Symphony by Ludwig van Beethoven

- by Ludwig van Beethoven
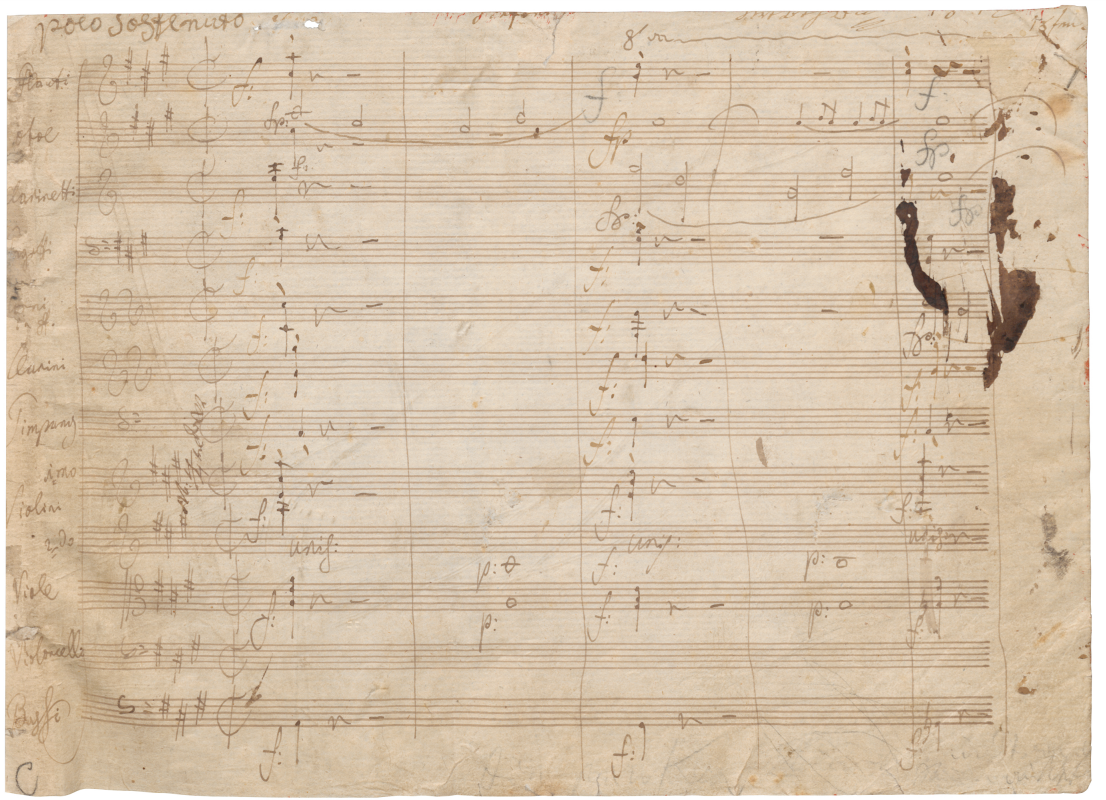
- First page of the autograph manuscript
- Key: A major
- Opus: 92
- Composed: 1811–1812: Teplitz
- Dedication: Count Moritz von Fries
- Duration: 33–45 minutes
- Movements: 4
- Scoring: Orchestra

Premiere
- Date: 8 December 1813
- Location: Vienna
- Conductor: Ludwig van Beethoven

II. Allegretto

IV. Allegro con brio

The Symphony No. 7 in A major, Op. 92, is a symphony in four movements composed by Ludwig van Beethoven between 1811 and 1812, while improving his health in the Bohemian spa town of Tepliz. The work is dedicated to Count Moritz von Fries.

At its premiere at the university in Vienna on 8 December 1813, Beethoven remarked that it was one of his best works. The second movement, "Allegretto", was so popular that audiences demanded an encore.

== History ==
When Beethoven began composing his Symphony No. 7, Napoleon was planning his campaign against Russia. After Beethoven's Symphony No. 3 (and possibly Symphony No. 5 as well), Symphony No. 7 seems to be another one of his musical confrontations with Napoleon, this time in the context of the European wars of liberation from years of Napoleonic domination.

Beethoven's life at this time was marked by a worsening hearing loss, which led him to use "conversation notebooks" to communicate.

=== Premiere and early performances ===
The work was premiered with Beethoven himself conducting in Vienna on 8 December 1813 at a charity concert for soldiers wounded in the Battle of Hanau. In Beethoven's address to the participants, the motives are not openly named: "We are moved by nothing but pure patriotism and the joyful sacrifice of our powers for those who have sacrificed so much for us."

The program also included the patriotic work Wellington's Victory, exalting the victory of the British over Napoleon's France. The orchestra was led by Beethoven's friend Ignaz Schuppanzigh and included some of the finest musicians of the day: violinist Louis Spohr, composers Johann Nepomuk Hummel, Giacomo Meyerbeer and Antonio Salieri. The Italian guitar virtuoso Mauro Giuliani played cello at the premiere.

The piece was very well received, such that the audience demanded the Allegretto movement be encored immediately. Spohr made particular mention of Beethoven's enthusiastic gestures on the podium ("as a sforzando occurred, he tore his arms with a great vehemence asunder ... at the entrance of a forte he jumped in the air"), and "the friends of Beethoven made arrangements for a repetition of the concert" by which "Beethoven was extricated from his pecuniary difficulties".

The symphony was also performed again in 1814 at the Großer Redoutensaal. The performance was a benefit concert for Beethoven to secure income during a period of financial struggle. Alongside the premiere of his Eighth Symphony, Wellington's Victory was also performed, just as it had been in the premiere of the Seventh. Beethoven's memorandum mentions that this performance had a heavily expanded string section and included 2 contrabassoons.

=== Editions ===
The first edition of the score and parts was published in 1816 by S. A. Steiner & Co.

The autograph of the work is preserved in the Jagiellonian Library in Kraków. A facsimile of Beethoven's manuscript was published in 2017 by Laaber Verlag.

== Instrumentation ==
The symphony is scored for two flutes, two oboes, two clarinets in A, two bassoons, two horns in A (E and D in the inner movements), two trumpets in D, timpani, and strings.

Although there is no contrabassoon part in the score, a memorandum from Beethoven himself shows that two contrabassoons were used at the 1814 concert to add strength to the bass parts.

== Form ==
There are four movements:

1. Poco sostenuto – Vivace (A major)
2. Allegretto (A minor)
3. Presto – Assai meno presto (trio) (F major, Trio in D major)
4. Allegro con brio (A major)

A typical performance lasts approximately 33–45 minutes depending on the choice of tempo, and whether the repeats in the 1st, 3rd, and 4th movements are omitted.

The work as a whole is known for its use of rhythmic devices suggestive of a dance, such as dotted rhythm and repeated rhythmic figures. It is also tonally subtle, making use of the tensions between the key centres of A, C and F. For instance, the first movement is in A major but has repeated episodes in C major and F major. In addition, the second movement is in A minor with episodes in A major, and the third movement, a scherzo, is in F major.

=== I. Poco sostenuto – Vivace ===
The first movement starts with a long, expanded introduction marked Poco sostenuto (metronome mark: = 69) that is noted for its long ascending scales and a cascading series of applied dominants that facilitates modulations to C major and F major. From the last episode in F major, the movement transitions to Vivace through a series of no fewer than sixty-one repetitions of the note E.

The Vivace (. = 104) is in sonata form, and is dominated by lively dance-like dotted rhythms, sudden dynamic changes, and abrupt modulations. The first theme of the Vivace is shown below.

The development section opens in C major and contains extensive episodes in F major. The movement finishes with a long coda, which starts similarly as the development section. The coda contains a famous twenty-bar passage consisting of a two-bar motif repeated ten times to the background of a grinding four octave deep pedal point of an E.

A typical performance of this movement lasts approximately 10–16 minutes.

=== II. Allegretto ===
The second movement in A minor has a tempo marking of allegretto ("a little lively"), making it slow only in comparison to the other three movements. This movement was encored at the premiere and has remained popular since. Its reliance on the string section makes it a good example of Beethoven's advances in orchestral writing for strings, building on the experimental innovations of Haydn.

The movement is structured in ternary form. It begins with the main melody played by the violas and cellos, an ostinato (repeated rhythmic figure, or ground bass, or passacaglia of a quarter note, two eighth notes and two quarter notes).

This melody is then played by the second violins while the violas and cellos play a second melody, described by George Grove as, "like a string of beauties hand-in-hand, each afraid to lose her hold on her neighbours". The first violins then take the first melody while the second violins take the second. This progression culminates with the wind section playing the first melody while the first violin plays the second.

After this, the music changes from A minor to A major as the clarinets take a calmer melody to the background of light triplets played by the violins. This section ends thirty-seven bars later with a quick descent of the strings on an A minor scale, and the first melody is resumed and elaborated upon in a strict fugato.

A typical performance of this movement lasts approximately 7–10 minutes.

=== III. Presto – Assai meno presto - Trio ===
The beginning of the scherzo

The beginning of the trio

The third movement is a scherzo in F major and trio in D major. Here, the trio (based on an Austrian pilgrims' hymn) is played twice rather than once. This expansion of the usual A–B–A structure of ternary form into A–B–A–B–A was quite common in other works of Beethoven of this period, such as his Fourth Symphony, Pastoral Symphony, and String Quartet Op. 59 No. 2.

A typical performance of this movement lasts approximately 7–9 minutes.

=== IV. Allegro con brio ===
The last movement is in sonata form. According to music historian Glenn Stanley, Beethoven "exploited the possibility that a string section can realize both angularity and rhythmic contrast if used as an obbligato-like background", particularly in the coda, which contains an example, rare in Beethoven's music, of the dynamic marking fff.

In his book Beethoven and his Nine Symphonies, Sir George Grove wrote, "The force that reigns throughout this movement is literally prodigious, and reminds one of Carlyle's hero Ram Dass, who has 'fire enough in his belly to burn up the entire world.'" Donald Tovey, writing in his Essays in Musical Analysis, commented on this movement's "Bacchic fury" and many other writers have commented on its whirling dance-energy. The main theme is a precise duple time variant of the instrumental ritornello in Beethoven's own arrangement of the Irish folk-song "Save me from the grave and wise", No. 8 of his Twelve Irish Folk Songs, WoO 154.

A typical performance of this movement lasts approximately 6–9 minutes.

== Reception ==
Critics and listeners have often felt stirred or inspired by the Seventh Symphony. For instance, one program-note author writes:

… the final movement zips along at an irrepressible pace that threatens to sweep the entire orchestra off its feet and around the theater, caught up in the sheer joy of performing one of the most perfect symphonies ever written.

Composer and music author Antony Hopkins says of the symphony:

The Seventh Symphony perhaps more than any of the others gives us a feeling of true spontaneity; the notes seem to fly off the page as we are borne along on a floodtide of inspired invention. Beethoven himself spoke of it fondly as "one of my best works". Who are we to dispute his judgment?

Another admirer, composer Richard Wagner, referring to the lively rhythms which permeate the work, called it the "apotheosis of the dance".

On the other hand, admiration for the work has not been universal. Friedrich Wieck, who was present during rehearsals, said that the consensus, among musicians and laymen alike, was that Beethoven must have composed the symphony in a drunken state; and the conductor Thomas Beecham commented on the third movement: "What can you do with it? It's like a lot of yaks jumping about."

The oft-repeated claim that Carl Maria von Weber considered the chromatic bass line in the coda of the first movement evidence that Beethoven was "ripe for the madhouse" seems to have been the invention of Beethoven's first biographer, Anton Schindler. His possessive adulation of Beethoven is well-known, and he was criticised by his contemporaries for his obsessive attacks on Weber. According to John Warrack, Weber's biographer, Schindler was characteristically evasive when defending Beethoven, and there is "no shred of concrete evidence" that Weber ever made the remark.
