= Johann von Fries =

Swiss politician (1719–1785)

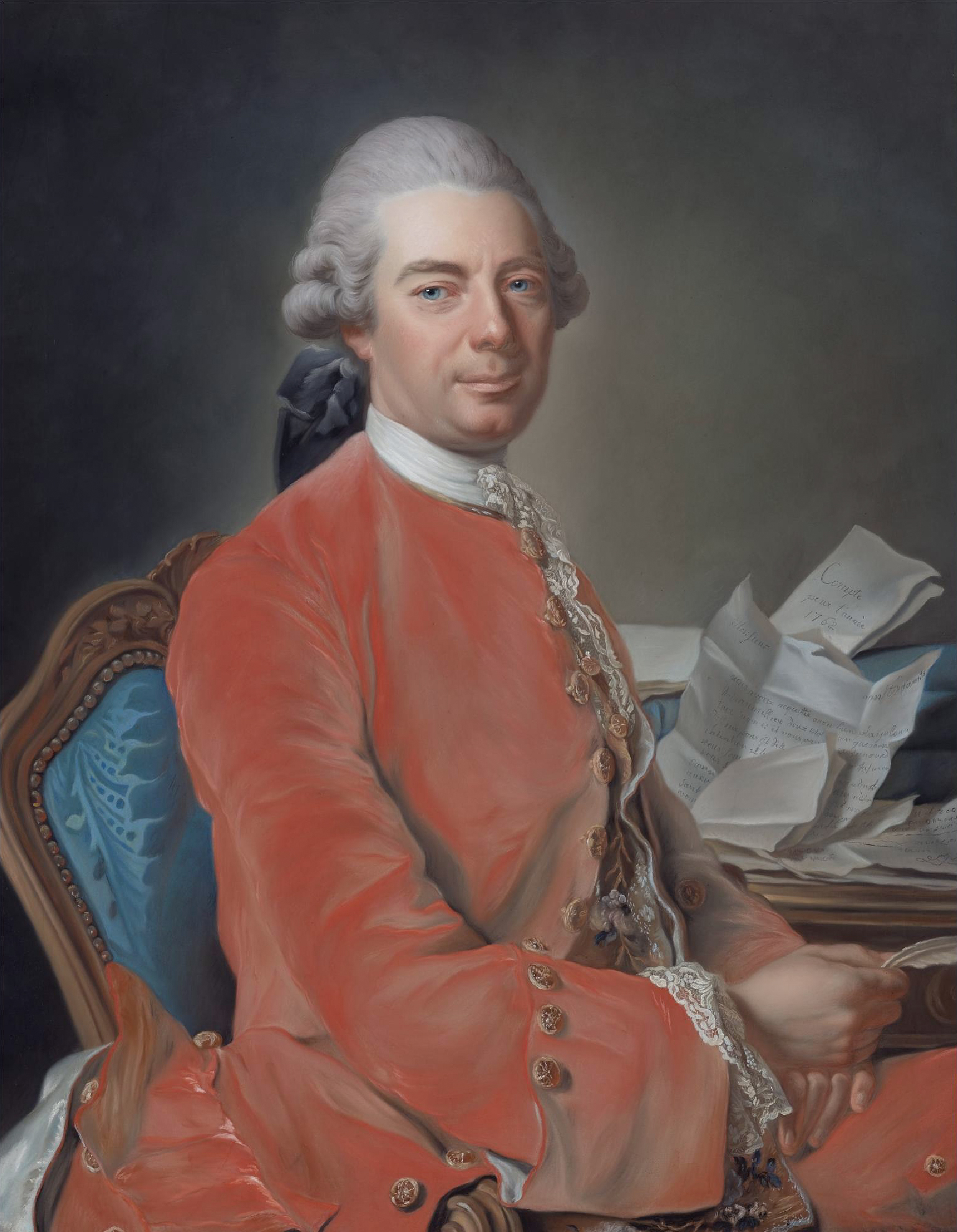
Johann Graf von Fries (Alexander Roslin)

Johann Graf von Fries (19 May 1719 in Mulhouse, Switzerland – 19 June 1785 in Bad Vöslau, Lower Austria) descended from a Swiss family of bankers. He was a counsellor, director of the imperial silk factories, industrialist and banker. His house in Vienna was the current Palais Pallavicini, built upon a monastery erected by Elisabeth of Austria, Queen of France (widow of King Charles IX of France) and closed in 1782 (the church is now the Lutheran City Church).

His son (and heir) was Count Moritz von Fries.

After his time as a mayor of Zürich he entered Austrian service. He was responsible for catering of the army. He was also a lifelong patron of Wolfgang Amadeus Mozart.

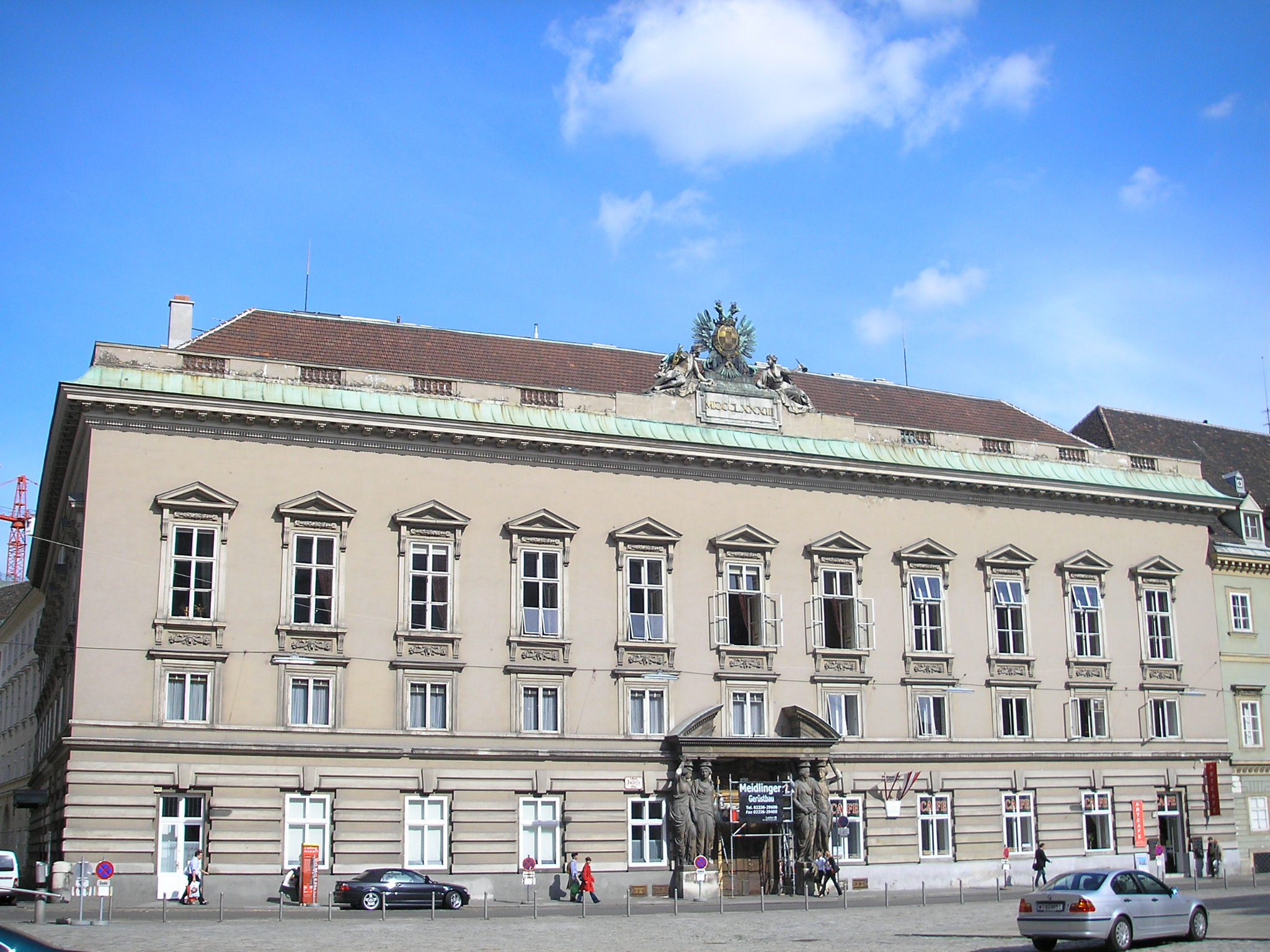
Palais Pallavicini on the Josefsplatz in Vienna
