= Count Moritz von Fries =

Austrian nobleman, banker and patron of the arts

Moritz Christian Johann Reichsgraf von Fries
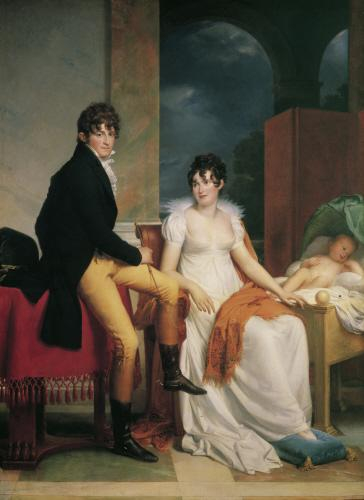
- The Count and his family, by François Gérard
- Born: 6 May 1777; Vienna, Holy Roman Empire
- Died: 26 December 1826 (aged 49); Paris, Kingdom of France
- Spouse: Princess Maria Theresa zu Hohenlohe-Waldenburg-Schillingsfürst
- Father: Count Johann Josef von Fries

Moritz Christian Johann Reichsgraf von Fries (6 May 1777 – 26 December 1826) was an Austrian nobleman, banker and patron of the arts.

== Early life ==
He was born in Vienna as the youngest son of Count Johann von Fries (1719–1785), one of the richest men in the Holy Roman Empire through a series of successful financial and industrial ventures, and his wife, Anna d’Escherny (1737–1807). The family lived at the Palais Fries, now Palais Pallavicini, in Vienna. He had three surviving siblings: Count Joseph Johann von Fries (1755–1788), Countess Ursula Viktoria von Schönfeld (1767–1805), and Countess Anna Philippina von Haugwitz (1769–1842).

== Personal life ==
In 1800, Moritz von Fries married Princess Maria Theresia zu Hohenlohe-Waldenburg-Schillingsfürst (1779–1819), the daughter of Prince Charles Albert I von Hohenlohe-Waldenburg-Schillingsfürst (1719-1793) by his second wife, Baroness Judith Anna Franziska Reviczky von Revisnye (1753-1836). At the time of his marriage, he owned 80% of the family bank, which was itself worth 2.5 million guilders. However, this was the height of von Fries' social and financial success, as the inflation and other economic troubles of the Napoleonic Wars coupled with the vast expenses of his standard of living progressively eroded his fortune. By 1826 von Fries was bankrupt, and moved to Paris with his second wife Fanny Münzenberg (1795–1869), dying shortly thereafter. His children were left penniless.

An admirer of music, Von Fries was also a collector of books and art. His art collection (which he inherited from his brother Johann and then substantially expanded) included over 300 works, including those by Raphael, van Dyck and Rembrandt, and his library extended to over 2,000 books. However, this extensive collection was all sold for the benefit of his creditors after his bankruptcy.

== Legacy ==
Today, von Fries is principally remembered for his patronage of the musical life of Vienna. A member of the Gesellschaft der Associierten Cavaliere, an association of noblemen that organised exclusive concerts with the leading musicians of the day, he also organised many private concerts and musical soirees, where he supported many musicians and composers, most notably Joseph Haydn, Ludwig van Beethoven and Franz Schubert. Haydn's oratorio The Creation was performed at the family residence, the Palais Fries, in April 1800, and Haydn also dedicated his last, unfinished, string quartet to von Fries.

It was at one of Fries's soirees that Beethoven was reportedly challenged to a trial of skill by Daniel Steibelt who consequently left Vienna in embarrassment. Beethoven dedicated two piano and violin sonatas, Op. 23 and Op. 24, to Fries, in return for his financial support. Von Fries inadvertently compromised the publication of these sonatas - Beethoven had arranged that, as their sponsor, the sonatas would be supplied to von Fries in manuscript for his exclusive enjoyment for a year prior to putting them to press. However, von Fries was tricked into supplying these manuscripts to the publisher Artaria, who immediately brought out a 'pirated' edition without Beethoven's permission. However, this error was evidently not fatal to Fries's relationship with Beethoven, who went on to dedicate his Op. 29 quintet and his Seventh Symphony to him.
