= List of compositions by Louis Spohr =

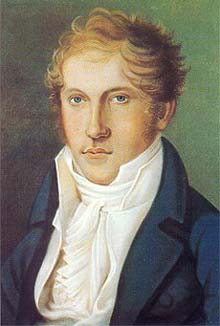
Spohr self-portrait

This is a list of compositions by Louis Spohr (1784–1859). The list is divided into works given an opus number by the composer and those that were not (WoO).

== With opus number ==
- Violin Concerto No. 1 in A major, Op. 1 (1802–03)
- Violin Concerto No. 2 in D minor, Op. 2 (1804)
- 3 Concertant Duos for 2 Violins, Op. 3
- 2 String Quartets, Op. 4 (No. 1 in C major, No. 2 in G minor) (1805)
- Potpourri No. 1 for Violin & String Trio, Op. 5 (1832)
- Theme and Variations for String Quartet, Op. 6
- Violin Concerto No. 3 in C major, Op. 7 (1805)
- Theme and Variations for String Quartet, Op. 8
- 2 Concertant Duos for 2 Violins, Op. 9 (1808)
- Violin Concerto No. 4 in B minor, Op. 10 (1805)
1. Allegro moderato
2. Adagio
3. Rondo. Allegretto
- String Quartet No. 3 in D minor, Op. 11 "Quatuor Brillant No. 1" (1806)
- Overture in C minor, Op. 12
- Duet for Violin and Viola in E minor, Op. 13
- 2 String Quartets, Op. 15 (No. 4 in E♭ major, No. 5 in D major) (1808)
- Sonata for Violin and Harp No. 2 in B♭ major, Op. 16 (1806)
- Violin Concerto No. 5 in E♭ major, Op. 17 (1807)
- Symphony No. 1 in E♭ major, Op. 20 (1811)
- Alruna, die Eulenkönigin (Overture), Op. 21
- Potpourri No. 2 in B♭ major on themes by Mozart for Violin & String Quartet (with Bass ad libitum), Op. 22
- Potpourri No. 3 in G major on themes by Mozart for Violin & Orchestra, Op. 23
- Potpourri No. 4 in B major on Don Giovanni and Die Entführung aus dem Serail by Mozart for String Quartet, Op. 24
- 6 Songs, Op. 25
- Clarinet Concerto No. 1 in C minor, Op. 26 (1808)
- String Quartet No. 6 in G minor, Op. 27 (1812)
- Violin Concerto No. 6 in G minor, Op. 28 (1808–09)
- 3 String Quartets, Op. 29 (No. 7 in E♭ major, No. 8 in C major, No. 9 in F minor)
- String Quartet No. 10 in A major, Op. 30 (1814)
- Nonet in F major, Op. 31 (1813)
- Octet in E major, Op. 32 (1814)
- 2 String Quintets (No. 1 in E♭ major, No. 2 in G major), Op. 33
- Notturno in C major, Op. 34 (1815)
- Fantasy in C minor for solo harp, Op. 35 (1807)
- Variations sur 'Je suis encore dans mon printemps', Op. 36
- 6 Songs, Op. 37
- Violin Concerto No. 7 in E minor, Op. 38 (1814)
- 3 Grand Duos for 2 Violins, Op. 39
- Grand polonaise in A minor, Op. 40 (1815)
- 6 Songs, Op. 41
- String Quartet No. 11 in E major "Quatuor Brillant No. 2", Op. 43 (1818)
- Motet "Rastlose Liebe" for male voice choir (Goethe), Op.44 no.2
- 3 String Quartets, Op. 45 (No. 12 in C major, No. 13 in E minor, No. 14 in F major)
- Violin Concerto No. 8 in A minor, Op. 47 (1816)
- Symphonie Concertante No. 1 in A major for 2 Violins and Orchestra, Op. 48 (1808)
- Symphony No. 2 in D minor, Op. 49 (1820)
- Grand Rondo in G major, Op.51
- Quintet for flute, clarinet, horn, bassoon and piano in C minor, Op. 52
- Piano Quintet No. 1 in C minor, Op. 53 (1820)
- Mass in C minor, Op. 54 (1820–21)
- Violin Concerto No. 9 in D minor, Op. 55 (1820)
- Clarinet Concerto No. 2 in E♭ major, Op. 57 (1810)
- 3 String Quartets, Op. 58 (No. 15 in E♭ major, No. 16 in A minor, No. 17 in G major)
- Potpourri on Irish Themes, Op. 59
- Overture, Faust, Op. 60
- String Quartet No. 18 in B minor "Quatuor Brillant No. 3", Op. 61
- Violin Concerto No. 10 in A major, Op. 62 (1810–11)
- Overture, Jessonda, Op. 63
- Double Quartet No. 1 in D minor, Op. 65 (1823)
- 3 Concertant Duos for 2 Violins, Op. 67
- String Quartet No. 19 in A major "Quatuor Brillant No. 4", Op. 68
- String Quintet No. 3 in B minor, Op. 69 (1826)
- Violin Concerto No. 11 in G major, Op. 70 (1827)
- 6 Songs, Op. 71
- 3 String Quartets, Op. 74 (No. 20 in A minor, No. 21 in B♭ major, No. 22 in D minor)
- Double Quartet No. 2 in E♭ major, Op. 77 (1827)
- Symphony No. 3 in C minor, Op. 78 (1828)
- Violin Concerto No. 12 in A major, Op. 79 (1828)
- Potpourri for Clarinet and Orchestra in F major, Op. 80
- Fantasy and Variations for Clarinet and String Quintet, Op. 81
- 3 String Quartets, Op. 82 (No. 23 in E major, No. 24 in G major, No. 25 in A minor)
- String Quartet No. 26 in E♭ major "Quatuor Brillant No. 5", Op. 83
- 3 String Quartets, Op. 84 (No. 27 in D minor, No. 28 in A♭ major, No. 29 in B minor)
- Three Psalms, Op. 85 (No.1 - ?; No.2 - Ps. 23 "Gott ist mein Hirt"; No.3 - Ps. 130 "Aus der Tiefen")
- Symphony No. 4 in F major "Die Weihe der Töne", Op. 86 (1832)
- Double Quartet No. 3 in E minor, Op. 87 (1833)
- Concertante No. 2 in B minor for 2 Violins and Orchestra, Op. 88 (1833)
- Waltz "a la Strauss" for orchestra "Erinnerung an Marienbad" in A major, Op. 89
- String Quintet No. 4 in A minor, Op. 91 (1833–34)
- Violin Concerto No. 13 in E major, Op. 92 (1835)
- String Quartet No. 30 in A major "Quatuor Brillant No. 6", Op. 93 (1835)
- Psalm 24 for Mixed Chorus, "Jehova ist die Erds", Op.97a
- Gott, du bist gross, cantata, Op. 98
- Lieder pour voix et piano à quatre mains, Op. 101
- Symphony No. 5 in C minor, Op. 102 (1837)
- Sechs Deutsche Lieder (Six German Songs) Op. 103
- String Quintet No. 5 in G minor, Op. 106 (1838)
- Violin Concerto No. 14 in A minor, Op. 110 (1839)
- Sonata for Violin and Harp No. 4 in E♭ major, Op. 113
- Sonata for Violin and Harp No. 5 in E♭ major, Op. 114
- Sonata for Violin and Harp No. 6 in A♭ major, Op. 115
- Symphony No. 6 in G major "Historical Symphony", Op. 116 (1839)
- Fantaisie sur des thèmes de Haendel et Abbé Vogler, Op. 118
- Piano Trio No. 1 in E minor, Op. 119 (1841)
- Symphony No. 7 in C major "The earthly and divine in human life", Op 121 (1841)
- Piano Trio No. 2 in F major, Op. 123 (1842)
- Piano Trio No. 3 in A minor, Op. 124 (1842)
- Piano Sonata in A♭ major, Op. 125 (1842–43)
- Concert Overture "Im ernsten stil" Op. 126
- 6 Duettinos, Op.127
- Violin Concerto No. 15 in E minor, Op. 128 (1844)
- String Quintet No. 6 in E minor, Op. 129 (1845)
- Piano Quintet No. 2 in D major, Op. 130 (1845)
- String Quartet Concerto in A minor, Op. 131
- String Quartet No. 31 in A major, Op. 132
- Piano Trio No. 4 in B♭ major, Op. 133 (1846)
- Psalm 84, "Wie lieblich ist dein heilig Haus", 4 soli, chorus, orch., Op. 134
- 6 Salonstücke, Op. 135
- Double Quartet No. 4 in G minor, Op. 136 (1847)
- Symphony No. 8 in G major, Op. 137 (1847)
- String Sextet in C major, Op. 140 (1848)
- String Quartet No. 32 in C major, Op. 141 (1849)
- Piano Trio No. 5 in G minor, Op. 142 (1849)
- Symphony No. 9 in B minor "The Seasons", Op. 143 (1850)
- String Quintet No. 7 in G minor, Op. 144 (1854)
- 6 Salonstücke, Op. 145
- String Quartet No. 33 in G major, Op. 146 (1851)
- Septet in A minor, Op. 147 (1853)
- Duo for 2 Violins in F major, Op. 148
- Rondoletto for piano in G major, Op. 149
- Duo for 2 Violins in D major, Op. 150
- String Quartet No. 34 in E♭ major, Op. 152 (1855)
- Duo for 2 Violins in C major, Op. 153
- 6 Songs, Op. 154

== Without opus number ==
- Grand Concert Overture in F major, WoO 1
- Fackeltanz in D major (lost), WoO 2
- Festmarsch in D major, WoO 3
- Introductory Music to Act 3 of "Die Belagerung Missolunghis" (lost), WoO 4
- Introduzione in D major, WoO 5
- Die Tochter der Luft (Phantasie in the form of a concert overture), WoO 6
- Overture to "Der Matrose", WoO 7
- Symphony No. 10 in E♭ major, WoO 8 – composed in 1857 but withheld by the composer.
- Violin Concerto in G major, WoO 9
- Violin Concerto in E minor, WoO 10
- Concertante for Violin, Cello, and Orchestra in C major, WoO 11
- Violin Concerto in A major, WoO 12
- Concertante for Violin and Harp in G major, WoO 13
- Concertante for Violin and Harp in E minor, WoO 14
- Variations on "Euer Liebreiz, eure Schönheit" in B♭ major, WoO 15, from the opera Alruna, WoO 49
- Violin Concerto Movement in D Major, WoO 16
- (unknown), WoO 17
- Variations for Violin and Orchestra in A major, WoO 18
- Clarinet Concerto No. 3 in F minor, WoO 19 (1821)
- Clarinet Concerto No. 4 in E minor, WoO 20 (1829)
- Sonata for Violin and Harp No. 1 in C minor, WoO 23 (1805)
- Sonata for Violin and Harp No. 3 in E minor, WoO 27
- Adagio for Violin and Piano in F major, WoO 35
- String Quartet No. 35 in E♭ major, WoO 41
- String Quartet No. 36 in G minor, WoO 42
- Die Prüfung, operetta in one act, WoO 48 (1806)
- Alruna, Grand Romantische Oper in three acts, WoO 49 (1808)
- Der Zweikampf mit der Geliebten, opera in three acts, WoO 50 (1810)
- Faust, Romantische Oper in two acts, WoO 51 (1813; revised with recitativos in 1852, WoO 51a)
- Zemire und Azor, Romantische Oper in two acts, WoO 52 (1818/19)
- Jessonda, grand opera in three acts, WoO 53 (1822)
- Der Berggeist, Romantische Oper in three acts, WoO 54 (1824)
- Pietro von Abano, Romantische Oper in two acts, WoO 56 (1827)
- Der Alchymist, Romantische Oper in three acts, WoO 57 (1829/30)
- Die Kreuzfahrer, Grand Opera in three acts, WoO 59 (1843/44)
- |Die letzten Dinge, WoO 61 (translated by Edward Taylor as The Last Judgement)
- Des Heilands letzte Stunden, WoO 62
- Overture, Der Fall Babylons, WoO 63
- Overture, Das befreite Deutschland, WoO 64
- Vater Unser, WoO 67
- Lied des verlassen Mädchens, WoO 90
- Nachgefühl, WoO 91
- Violin Études
- Motet: Das Lied (Wie ein stolzer Adler) for male voice choir, 1855
- Hymn "Who are these arrayed in white?" for male voice choir, date unknown
