= Op. 43 =

In music, Op. 43 stands for Opus number 43. Compositions that are assigned this number include:

- Atterberg – Aladdin
- Beethoven – The Creatures of Prometheus
- Chopin – Tarantelle
- Elgar – Dream Children
- Milhaud – Little Symphony No. 1
- Nielsen – Wind Quintet
- Rachmaninoff – Rhapsody on a Theme of Paganini
- Rossini – La Danza
- Roussel – Bacchus and Ariadne
- Schumann – 3 Duets
- Scriabin – Symphony No. 3
- Shostakovich – Symphony No. 4
- Sibelius – Symphony No. 2 in D major (1902)
- Spohr – String Quartet No. 11
- Strauss – Explosions-Polka
- Tchaikovsky – Orchestral Suite No. 1
- Waterhouse – Gestural Variations
