= List of compositions by Kurt Atterberg =

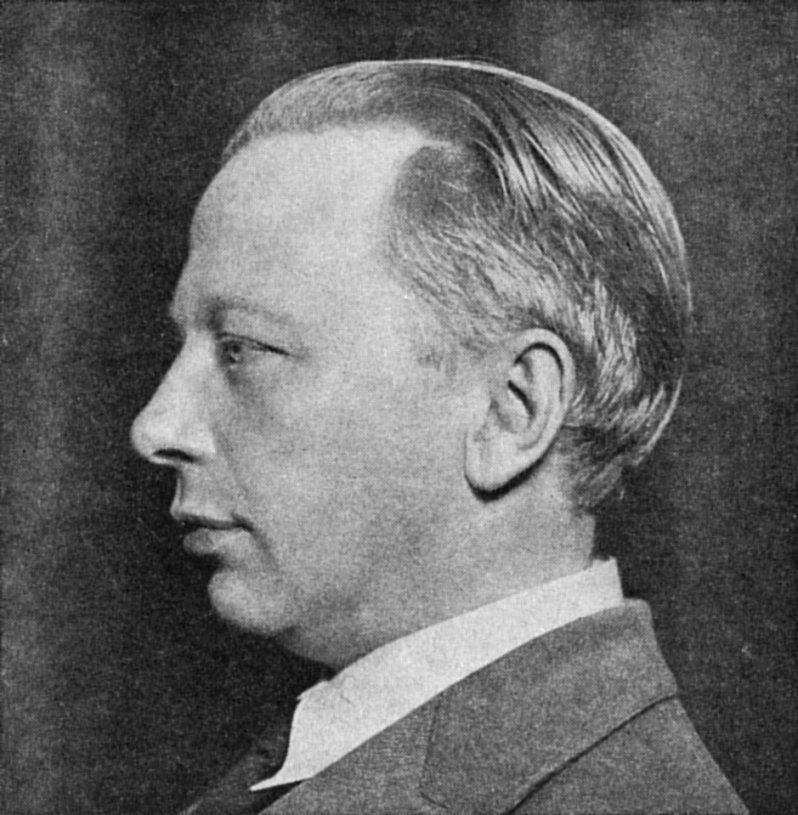
Kurt Atterberg

This is a list of compositions by Kurt Atterberg.

== List of works by main categories ==
=== Orchestral ===
==== Symphonies ====
- Op. 3 Symphony No. 1 in B minor (1909–1911)
- Op. 6 Symphony No. 2 in F major (1911–1913)
- Op. 10 Symphony No. 3 in D major "Västkustbilder" (1914–1916)
- Op. 14 Symphony No. 4 in G minor "Sinfonia piccola" (byggd på svenska folkmotiv) (1918)
- Op. 20 Symphony No. 5 in D minor "Sinfonia funèbre" (1919–1922)
- Op. 31 Symphony No. 6 in C major "Dollar Symphony" (1927–1928)
- Op. 45 Symphony No. 7 in A minor "Sinfonia romantica" (1942)
- Op. 48 Symphony No. 8 in E minor "På Svenska Folkmotiv" (1944)
- Op. 53 Symphony for Strings (Sinfonia per Archi, 1953)
- Op. 54 Symphony No. 9 in B♭ minor "Sinfonia visionaria" for soloists (mezzo-soprano & baritone), chorus, and orchestra (1955–1956)

==== Orchestral Suites ====
- Suite No. 1 "Orientale" (1913)
- Suite No. 2 "Fem stycken" for chamber orchestra (1915)
- Op. 19,1 Suite No. 3 for violin, viola and string orchestra (1917)
- Op. 19,2 Suite No. 4 "Turandot" or '"Chinese suite" for small orchestra (1920)
- Op. 23 Suite No. 5 "Barocco" for flute, oboe, clarinet, and strings (1923)
- Op. 30 Suite No. 6 "Orientalische Legende" for flute, oboe, clarinet, percussion, piano and string orchestra (1925)
- Op. 29 Suite No. 7 for string orchestra after music for a scene of Antoine et Cléopatre of Shakespeare (1926)
- Op. 34 Suite No. 8 "Suite pastorale in modo antico" for small orchestra (1931)
- Op. 47 Suite No. 9 "Suite dramatica" for chamber orchestra (1944)

==== Concertos ====
- Op. 1 Rhapsody for Piano and Orchestra (1909)
- Op. 7 Concerto for Violin in E minor (1913)
- Op. 21 Concerto for Cello in C minor (1922)
- Op. 28 Concerto for Horn in A minor (1926)
- Op. 37 Concerto for Piano in B♭ minor (1935)
- Op. 57 Double concerto for violin, cello, and string orchestra (1959–1960)

==== Works for brass ====
- De fåvitska jungfrurna rhapsody arranged by Gösta Morberg
- Marica trionfale della bella Lucia

==== Other orchestral works ====
- Op. 4 Concert Overture in A minor (1910/12 rev. 1933)
- Op. 18 Svit ur Stormen ("Storm suite") No. 1 (1921/1936)
- Op. 26 Rondeau retrospectif (1925)
- Op. 33 Älven - från fjällen till havet (The River - from the Mountains to the Sea) symphonic poem (1929)
- Op. 36 En värmlandsrapsodi (A Varmland Rhapsody) (published 1935)
- Op. 38 Ballade and Passacaglia over a theme from a Swedish folk tune (1935)
- Op. 40 Kungahyllning for Concert Band (1938)
- Op. 41 Concert overture in popular style (1940)
- Op. 42 Rondeau caracteristique (1939–1940)
- Op. 43 Aladdin - five pieces (1941)
- Op. 44 Aladdin. Ouverture (Perpetuum mobile orientale)
- Op. 51 Indian tunes (1950)
- Op. 52 Daldansen (1951-1952)
- Op. 55 Rondo-overture on melodies from Birger Sjoberg's "Fridas Bok" (1956-7)
- Svensk sommarfest (Swedish summer party) for chamber orchestra (1957)
- Op. 56 Ballad without words (1958)
- Op. 58 Vittorioso (1962) (original finale to Symphony No. 7)
- Op. 59 Svit ur Stormen "Storm suite" No. 2 (1964–1965)

=== Stage music ===
==== Operas ====
- Op. 12 Härvard Harpolekare (1916–18)
- Op. 50 Härvards Heimkehr - Revision of Op. 12 (1951)
- Op. 24 Bäckahästen (1923–24)
- Op. 35 Fanal (1929–32)
- Op. 43 Aladdin (1936–41)
- Op. 49 Stormen "The Storm" (1946–47)

==== Ballets ====
- Op. 9 Per Svinaherde (1914–15)
- Ballettskizzen (1919)
- Op. 17 De fåvitska jungfrurna (1920)

==== Music for the theatre ====
- Jefta (1913)
- Mats und Petter (1915)
- Schwester Beatrice (1917)
- Op. 13 Perseus och vidundret "Persus and the wonder" (1918)
- Turandot (1920)
- Op. 18 Der Sturm "The Storm" (1921)
- Op. 22 De tre mostrarna (1923)
- Ein Wintermärchen (1923)
- Hassan (1925)
- Antonius und Kleopatra (1926)

=== Vocal ===
- Op. 5 Det är sabbatsdag i bygden for baritone and orchestra (text of Olof Thunman) (1911/13)
- Svarta svanor song for baritone or soprano and orchestra (text of Carl Johan Gustaf Snoilsky) (1913/14)
- Ave maris stella for chorus (1917)
- Op. 8 Requiem for soloists, chorus and orchestra (text of van Gustav Schlyter) (1914)
- Op. 16 Järnbäraland for soloists, chorus and orchestra (text of van Hugo Tigerschiöld) (1919)
- Op. 25 Das Lied for soloists (chœur ad lib.) and orchestra (1925)
- Op. 32 Sångens land "The Land of Song" for soloists (chœur ad lib.) and orchestra (text of Ture Rangström) (1928)

=== Chamber music ===
==== String quartets ====
- Op. 2 String Quartet No. 1 in D major (1909) ("Adagio and Scherzo")
- Op. 11 String Quartet No. 2 in B minor (1918)
- Op. 39 String Quartet No. 3 in D major (1937)

==== Other chamber ====
- Reverence à Bach for two cellos (1905)
- Op. 19,2 Suite No. 4 "Suite chinoise" for string quartet (1920)
- Op. 22 bis Bergslags-serenad for string quartet or string orchestra (published ca. 1950)
- Op. 27 Sonata for cello (or violin/viola/horn) and piano in B minor (1925, horn version 1955)
- Op. 31a Piano Quintet in C major (adaption from Symphony No. 6; 1928/1942)
- Op. 46 Variations and fugues - over a text of Bellman for string quartet (1944)
- Sorgmarch (Funeral march) in memoriam His Majesty Gustav V for horn quartet (1950)
- Op. 53a Symphony for strings - version for string quintet of Sinfonia Op. 53 (1953)
- Op. 57a Trio concerto for violin, cello and harp - chamber version (1959/60, rev. 1965)

=== Instrumental ===
==== Piano ====
- Syster Beatrice - Valse "Fantôme" of Maeterlinck (1917)
- Op. 15 2 Höstballader "Autumn Ballads" (1918)
- Op. 26 Rondeau rétrospectif for piano four hands

==== Organ ====
- Bröllopsmarsch "Wedding March" for organ (1916)
- Preludium and fugue for organ (1917)

=== Arrangements ===
- Op. 36 Brahms, String Sextet No. 2 for string orchestra (1939)
