= Potpourri (music) =

Musical form

Potpourri or Pot-Pourri (/ˌpoʊpʊˈriː/ POH-puurr-EE, French: [popuʁi]; lit. 'putrid pot') is a kind of musical form structured as ABCDEF..., the same as medley or, sometimes, fantasia. It is often used in light, easy-going and popular types of music.

This is a form of arrangement where the individual sections are simply juxtaposed with no strong connection or relationship. This type of form is organized by the principle of non-repetition. This is usually to be applied to a composition that consists of a string of favourite tunes, like a potpourri based on either some popular opera, operetta, or a collection of songs, dances, etc.

The term has been in use since the beginning of the 18th century, or to be more specific, since it was used by the French music publisher Christophe Ballard (1641–1715) for the edition of a collection of pieces in 1711. In the 18th century the term was used in France for collections of songs which, with a thematic link, were sometimes given stage presentation. Later the term was used also for instrumental collections, like the "Potpourry français", a collection of originally unconnected dance pieces issued by the publisher Bouïn.

Potpourris became especially popular in the 19th century. The opera overtures of French composers, such as François-Adrien Boïeldieu (1775–1834), Daniel Auber (1782–1871) and Ferdinand Hérold (1791–1833), or the Englishman Arthur Sullivan (1842–1900) belong to this type. Richard Strauss called the overture to his Die schweigsame Frau a "pot-pourri".

The "overtures" to light modern stage works (e.g. operettas or musicals) are almost always written in potpourri form, using airs from the work in question. There is usually some structure to the order presented though. The opening is usually a fanfare or majestic theme (presumably the supposed hoped-for most popular song number), followed by a romantic number, then a comical number; and finally a return to the opening theme or a variation thereof.

== Additional examples ==
The Italian guitar virtuoso Mauro Giuliani, (1781–1829) entitled a number of his works "potpourris": Potpourri, Opp. 18, 26, 28, 31, 42, and Potpourri Romano, Op. 108

There are many more pieces called "potpourris":

- Louis Spohr: Potpourri No. 2 on themes by Mozart for violin, string quartet & double bass in B flat major, Op. 22
- Louis Spohr: Potpourri No. 4 on themes by Mozart for violin & string trio in B major, Op. 24
- Louis Spohr: Potpourri for Clarinet and Orchestra on themes by von Winter in F major, Op. 80
- Carl Maria von Weber: Grand potpourri for cello and orchestra, Op.20
- Johann Strauss: Potpourri Quadrille
- Ernst Krenek: Potpourri, Op. 54 for symphony orchestra
- John Philip Sousa: Carmen grand potpourri de concert
- Giacomo Meyerbeer's L'Africaine Potpourri
- André Rieu: Opera Potpourri (2003)
- Johann Nepomuk Hummel: Potpourri Op. 94 (Fantasie) for Viola and Orchestra
- Karol Kurpinski: Potpourri in D minor for Piano Solo (1822 ca.)
- The Beatles: The Long One (1969)
- Juan Gabriel: Hasta Que Te Conocí (Popurrí) (1990)

== Quotations ==
"If music is frozen architecture, then the potpourri is frozen coffee-table gossip... Potpourri is the art of adding apples to pears..." (Arnold Schoenberg: "Glosses on the Theories of Others" (1929), See "Style and Idea", Faber and Faber 1985, p. 313–314)

== See also ==
- Rhapsody
- Quodlibet

== Bibliography ==
- M. Schönherr and K. Reinöhl: Johann Strauss Vater (London, 1954)
- Andreas Ballsteadt: Potpourri. In Ludwig Finscher (ed.): MGG, Sachteil, vol. 7.
- Till Gerrit Waidelich: Das Opern-Potpourri: Musikalisches Kaleidoskop, ars combinatoria oder musikimmanente Pornographie? In Hans-Joachim Hinrichsen/K. Pietschmann (ed.): Jenseits der Bühne: Bearbeitungs- und Rezeptionsformen der Oper im 19. und 20. Jahrhundert (Schweizer Beiträge zur Musikforschung; 15), Kassel 2010, p. 128-138.
