= Ferdinánd Pálffy =

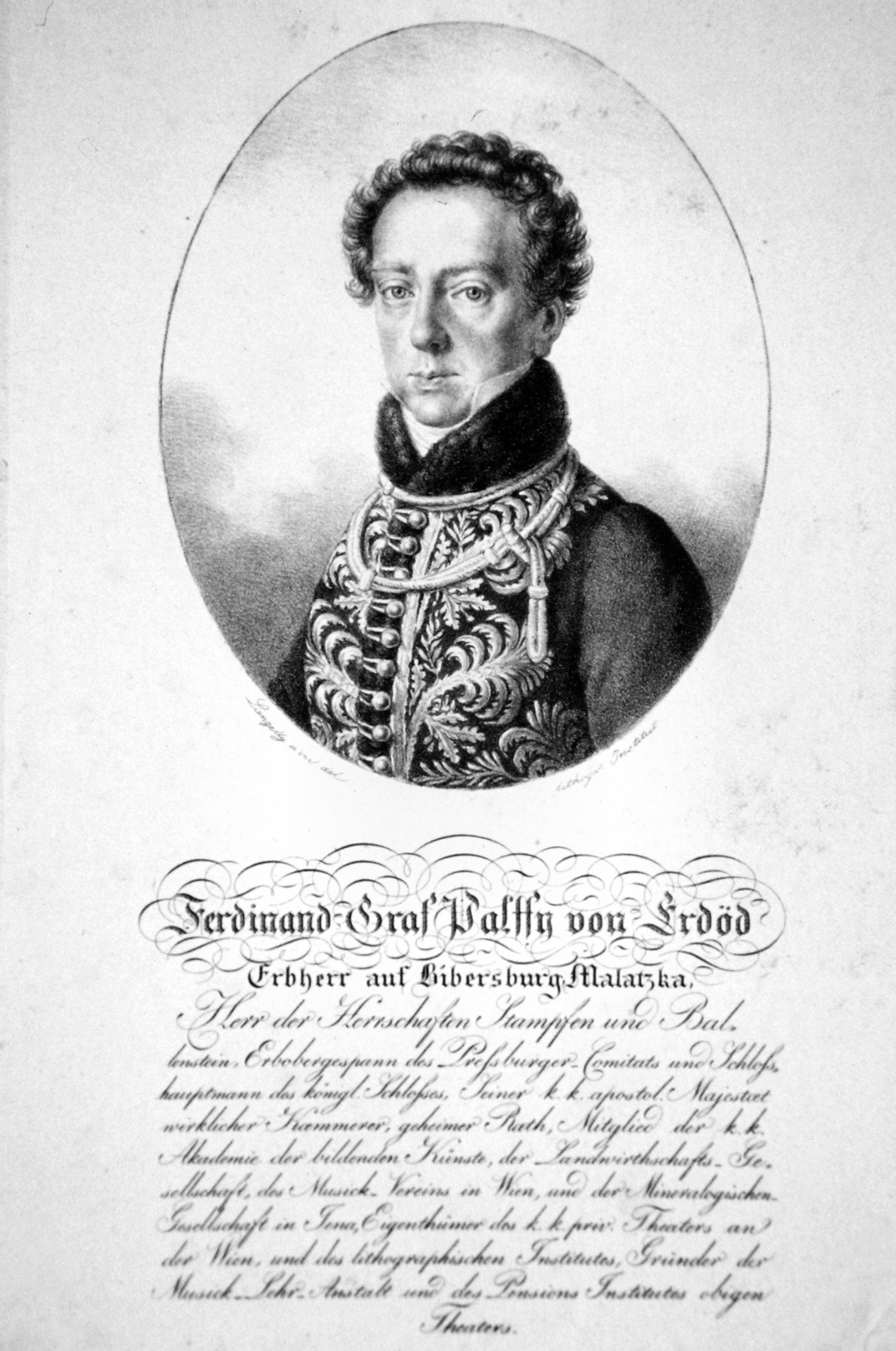
Lithograph by Joseph Lanzedelly the Elder, c. 1820

Count Ferdinánd Pálffy de Erdőd (1 February 1774 – 4 February 1840) was a mining engineer and civil servant of the Austrian Empire who is better remembered for his role in managing the Theater an der Wien, Vienna, in pursuit of which he lost his not inconsiderable fortune and retired from his creditors in Vienna.

== Life ==
Born in the Habsburg residence Vienna the son of Count Lipót Pálffy de Erdőd (1739–1799), he was a distant relative of the Imperial field marshal and Hungarian palatine János Pálffy (1664–1751). He attended the mining institute at Schemnitz, Hungary (now Banská Štiavnica, Slovakia) from 1794 to 1796, where he remained in government service before returning to Vienna in 1806 to work in the Austrian ministry of mines.

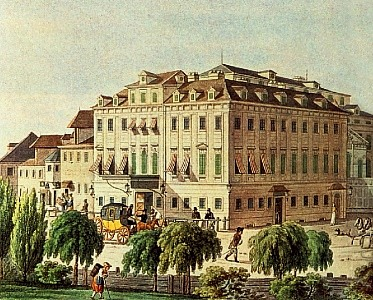
Jakob Alt: Theater an der Wien, 1815

In 1807 Pálffy was among the association of court nobles that acquired the Theater an der Wien, as well as the leases of the other two theatres patronised by the court, the Burgtheater and the Theater am Kärntnertor. By degrees he became solely responsible for the court theaters, and in 1813 he acquired outright the Theater an der Wien, inducing Louis Spohr to come from his court appointment in Gotha to conduct its orchestra.

Count Pálffy was a dedicated patroniser of Ludwig van Beethoven, whom he reserved an honored place in his theatre—in close vicinity to the orchestra due to Beethoven's incipient deafness. According to Spohr, he nevertheless was vociferously accursed by the impetuous composer. Under Pálffy's directorship, the Theater an der Wien saw the premiere of Helmina von Chézy's Rosamunda, which sank without a trace, save for its incidental music by Franz Schubert, whose 1820 melodrama Die Zauberharfe found eight performances at the Theater, for which Schubert dedicated to Palffy his Grande Sonata in B-flat major (D 617). He found fault with Spohr's 1813 opera Faust, so that Carl Maria von Weber arranged its premiere at the Prague Estates Theatre in 1816.

During the period of his proprietorship, which lasted until 1826, he offered opera and ballet and, to appeal to a wider Viennese audience, popular pantomime and variety acts, losing money in elaborate spectacles until he was forced to sell the theater at auction in 1826, and to disperse his library and collection of mineral specimens. Fearing arrest for his outstanding debts, he fled Vienna for Preßburg (Bratislava) where he remained for several years.
