= Žiželice =

Žiželice may refer to places in the Czech Republic:

- Žiželice (Kolín District), a municipality and village in the Central Bohemian Region
- Žiželice (Louny District), a municipality and village in the Ústí nad Labem Region
