= Symphony No. 2 (Spohr) =

Symphony by Louis Spohr

- by Louis Spohr
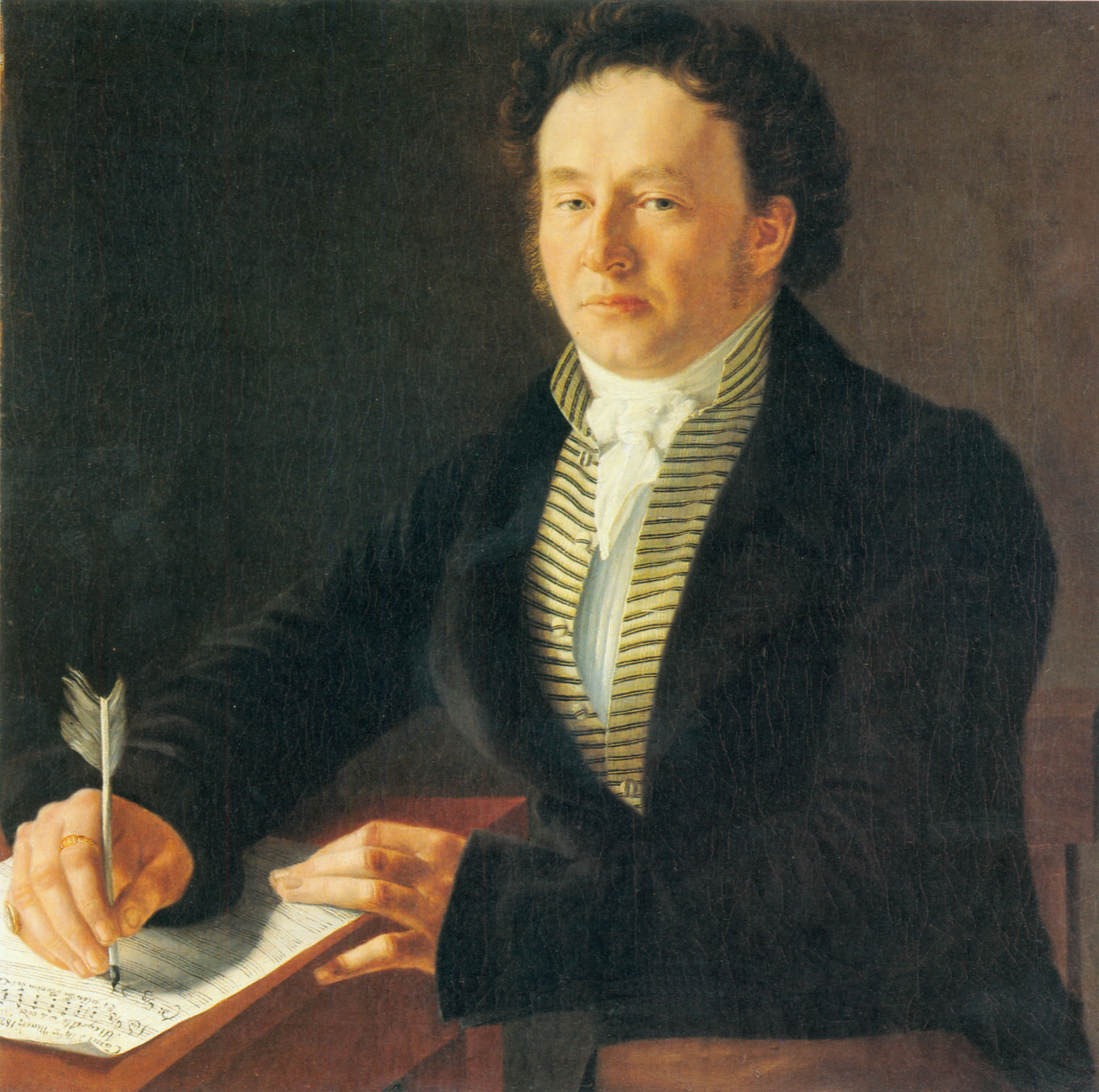
- Portrait of Louis Spohr in 1824
- Key: D minor
- Opus: 49
- Movements: four
- Scoring: Orchestra

The Symphony No. 2 in D minor, Op. 49 by Louis Spohr was written in London and published in 1820 and first performed in April of that year in a concert of the Royal Philharmonic Society.

== Movements ==
The symphony is divided into four movements with the following tempo markings:

1. Allegro (D minor)
2. Larghetto (B♭ major)
3. Scherzo. Presto (D minor)
4. Finale. Vivace (D major)

== Recordings ==
The symphony has been recorded by Howard Griffiths and the NDR Radiophilharmonie, as well as Howard Shelley with the Orchestra della Svizzera Italiana. A recording by Alfred Walter and the Budapest Symphony Orchestra on the Naxos label is also available.
