= String Quartet No. 30 =

String Quartet No. 30 may refer to:

- String Quartet No. 30 (Haydn) by Joseph Haydn
- String Quartet No. 30 (Spohr) by Louis Spohr
