= Op. 93 =

In music, Op. 93 stands for Opus number 93. Compositions that are assigned this number include:

- Beethoven – Symphony No. 8
- Britten – Phaedra
- Dvořák – Othello
- Schumann – Motet, "Verzweifle nicht im Schmerzenstal" for double chorus and organ ad lib
- Shostakovich – Symphony No. 10
- Sibelius – Song of the Earth (Jordens sång), cantata for mixed choir and orchestra (1919)
- Spohr – String Quartet No. 30
