= String Quartet No. 18 =

String Quartet No. 18 may refer to:

- String Quartet No. 18 (Milhaud), Op. 308, by Darius Milhaud
- String Quartet No. 18 (Mozart) by Wolfgang Amadeus Mozart
- String Quartet No. 18 (Spohr) by Louis Spohr
