= Symphony No. 4 (Spohr) =

Composition by Louis Spohr

- by Louis Spohr
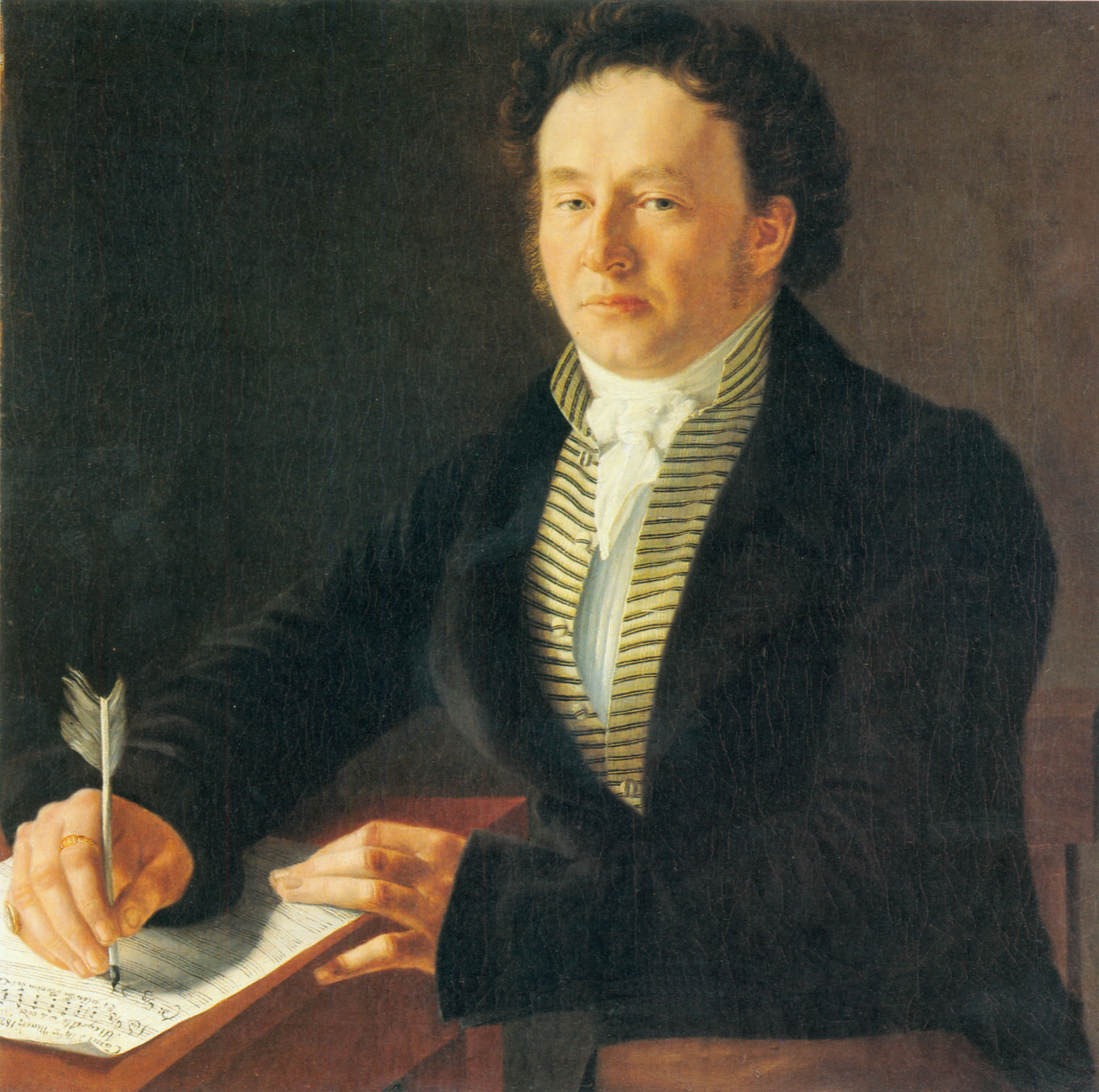
- Portrait of Louis Spohr in 1824
- Key: F major
- Opus: 86
- Movements: four
- Scoring: Orchestra

The Symphony No. 4 in F major, Op. 86 by Louis Spohr has the title "Die Weihe der Töne," meaning "The Consecration of Sound," and is a programmatic work based on the poem of the same name by Carl Pfeiffer. It was composed in 1832 and published in 1834.

== Movements ==
The symphony is divided into four movements with the following tempo markings:

1. Largo – Allegro (F major)
2. Andantino – Allegro (B flat major)
3. Tempo di marcia – Andante maestoso (D major)
4. Larghetto – Allegretto (F major)

An alternative division of the work is sometimes given, more clearly illustrating the work's programmatic nature:

1. Largo. Starres Schweigen der Natur vor dem Erschaffen des Tons
2. Allegro. Reges Leben nach demselben. Naturlaute. Aufruhr der Elemente
3. Andantino. Wiegenlied
4. Allegro. Tanz
5. Tempo di Marcia. Kriegsmusik. Fortziehen in die Schlacht. Gefuhle der Zuruckbleibenden. Ruckkehr der Sieger
6. Andante maestoso. Dankgebet (Ambrosianischer Lobgesang)
7. Larghetto. Bergrabnismusik
8. Allegretto. Trost in Tränen

Nos. 1 and 2 constitute the first movement, 3 and 4 the second, 5 and 6 the third, and 7 and 8 the fourth.

== Recordings ==
The symphony has been recorded by Howard Griffiths and the NDR Radiophilharmonie, as well as Howard Shelley with the Orchestra della Svizzera Italiana. A recording by Alfred Walter and the Budapest Symphony Orchestra on the Naxos label is also available.
