= String Quartet in G minor =

String Quartet in G minor may refer to:

- No. 3 of the String Quartets, Op. 20 (Haydn)
- String Quintet No. 4 (Mozart)
- String Quartet No. 6 (Spohr)
- String Quartet No. 9 (Schubert)
- String Quartet No. 1 (Grieg)
- String Quartet (Debussy)
- String Quartet No. 1 (Nielsen)
- String Quartet No. 2 (Hill)
