= Op. 24 =

In music, Op. 24 stands for Opus number 24. Compositions that are assigned this number include:

- Barber – Knoxville: Summer of 1915
- Beethoven – Violin Sonata No. 5
- Berlioz – La damnation de Faust
- Bliss – A Colour Symphony
- Brahms – Variations and Fugue on a Theme by Handel
- Chopin – Mazurkas, Op. 24
- Enescu – Piano Sonata No. 1
- Enescu – Piano Sonata No. 3
- Fauré – Élégie
- Grieg – Ballade in the Form of Variations on a Norwegian Folk Song
- Hindemith – Kammermusik
- Kabalevsky – Colas Breugnon
- Larsson – God in Disguise (Förklädd gud), a cantata ("lyric suite") for narrator, soloists, mixed chorus, and orchestra (1940)
- McGregor – Outlier
- Moroi – Sinfonietta
- Paderewski – Symphony in B minor
- Rachmaninoff – The Miserly Knight
- Ries – Violin Concerto
- Rózsa – Violin Concerto
- Schumann – Liederkreis, Op. 24
- Scriabin – Rêverie
- Sibelius – Ten Pieces, Op. 24, for solo piano (1895–1903)
- Spohr – Potpourri No. 4
- Strauss – Death and Transfiguration
- Szymanowski – The Love Songs of Hafiz
- Tchaikovsky – Eugene Onegin
- Vierne – Symphony
- Voříšek – Symphony in D
- Webern – Concerto for Nine Instruments
