= String Quartet No. 19 =

String Quartet No. 19 may refer to:

- String Quartet No. 19 (Mozart), Dissonance by Wolfgang Amadeus Mozart
- String Quartet No. 19 (Spohr) by Louis Spohr
