= Op. 26 =

In music, Op. 26 stands for Opus number 26. Compositions that are assigned this number include:

- Barber – Piano Sonata
- Beethoven – Piano Sonata No. 12
- Brahms – Piano Quartet No. 2
- Bruch – Violin Concerto No. 1
- Chopin – Polonaises, Op. 26
- Dvořák – Piano Trio No. 2
- Enescu – Cello Sonata No. 2
- Ernst – Grand Caprice on "Erlkönig"
- Goldmark – Rustic Wedding Symphony
- Kabalevsky – The Comedians
- Mendelssohn – The Hebrides
- Myaskovsky – Symphony No. 8
- Oswald – Piano Quartet No. 2
- Prokofiev – Piano Concerto No. 3
- Sarasate – Spanish Dances, Book IV
- Schoenberg – Wind Quintet
- Schumann – Faschingsschwank aus Wien
- Scriabin – Symphony No. 1
- Sibelius – Finlandia, tone poem for orchestra (1899, revised 1900)
- Spohr – Clarinet Concerto No. 1
- Tchaikovsky – Sérénade mélancolique
- Waterhouse – Piccolo Quintet
- Weber – Concertino for Clarinet
