= String Quartet in E major =

String Quartet in E major may refer to:

- String Quartet No. 11 (Spohr)
- String Quartet No. 11 (Schubert)
- String Quartet No. 8 (Dvořák)
