= Joseph Karl Bernard =

Austrian journalist and librettist

Joseph Karl Bernard (forenames also spelled Joseph Carl, Josef Karl and Josef Carl; 26 January 1780 – 31 March 1850) was an Austrian journalist and librettist, and friend of Ludwig van Beethoven.

== Life ==
Bernard was born in Horatitz (present-day Hořetice, part of Žiželice in the Czech Republic), and studied in Žatec, Prague and Heidelberg. He moved to Vienna about 1800, and was employed there by the Hofkriegsrat.

He edited the magazine Thalia from 1810 to 1813, and Friedensblätter in 1814; he was a collaborator for the magazine Wiener Zeitschrift für Kunst, Literatur und Mode. For 30 years until 1847 (initially for foreign affairs) he was editor of Wiener Zeitung. From 1849 he published the daily paper Austria.

=== Librettist ===
He wrote the libretti for Louis Spohr's opera Faust (1814), and Conradin Kreutzer's opera Libussa (1823).

Bernard was a friend of Beethoven for many years, and appears frequently in Beethoven's conversation books (used during the composer's later years of deafness). The composer often asked for his advice in various matters.

In 1815 Bernard rewrote the text, originally written by Aloys Weissenbach, of Beethoven's cantata Der glorreiche Augenblick, Op. 136 (first performed in 1814). He later wrote the text for a projected oratorio by Beethoven, Der Sieg des Kreuzes (The Victory of the Cross), commissioned in 1818 by the Gesellschaft der Musikfreunde. In 1823 Bernard delivered the text, awaited since 1820; Beethoven, dissatisfied with Bernard's work, told the Gesellschaft that corrections to the text were necessary. The oratorio was never written.
