= String Quartet No. 6 (Spohr) =

String quartet by Louis Spohr

Louis Spohr's String Quartet No. 6 ("Gran Quatuor") in G minor, Op. 27, was completed in 1812. Dedicated to Count Razumovsky, the dedicatee of Beethoven's Opus 59 string quartets, the composition, like the earlier String Quartet No. 3, is a concertante work with the musical emphasis being placed on the first violinist, while the other players act as accompaniment.

== Movements ==
The composition is in four-movement form:

1. Allegro moderato
2. Adagio
3. Menuetto: Allegro
4. Finale: Vivace

Keith Warsop notes that the Adagio second movement seems to have been adapted from sketches to an unfinished violin concerto.
