= Dorette Spohr =

German musician

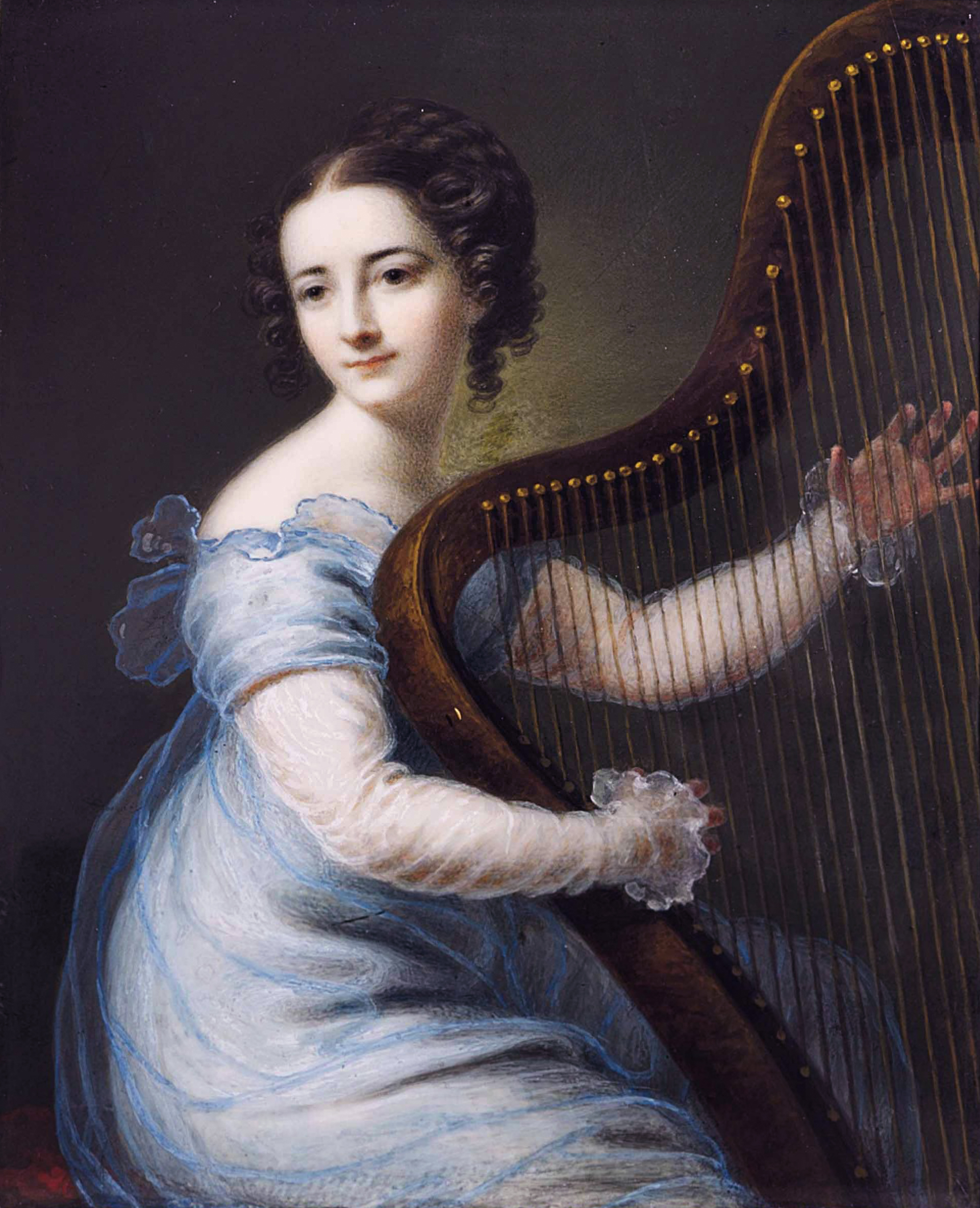
- Portrait of Spohr, painted by Carl Gottlob Schmeidler
- Born: 2 December 1787; Kassel, Germany
- Died: 20 November 1834 (aged 46)
- Occupations: harpist and pianist

Dorette Spohr (2 December 1787 – 20 November 1834), also called Dorette Scheidler Spohr, was a German harpist and pianist active in the early 19th century.

== Biography ==
Dorette Spohr was born as Dorette Scheidler on 2 December 1787 in Kassel, Germany. Her father was a cellist and chamber musician from Gotha, and her mother was a singer. She learned harp from Johann Georg Heinrich Backofen, who was a harpist at the court of Gotha.

In 1805, Scheidler met Louis Spohr, a concertmaster at the court of Gotha. They were married on 2 February 1806.

== Music career ==
Spohr initially performed music composed by Backofen, but after her marriage, Louis Spohr composed for her. Between June 1806 and October 1807, Spohr bought a harp from Paris using part of her dowry. From 1810 to 1812, Spohr was principal harpist at the court of Gotha, where she taught the Duke's daughter, Princess Louise of Saxe-Gotha-Altenburg. Spohr and her husband toured Germany, Switzerland, and Russia, performing with a number of musical orchestras.

In 1820, after experiencing difficulties adapting to a new harp with a double-action pedal mechanism, Spohr retired from playing harp. After her retirement, she became interested in piano.

Spohr died in 1834 following a fever. Although she seems “not to have composed any music herself," Rensch says that "she inspired the composition of some of the first major ensemble music for harp and violin."
