= Vasily Kalafati =

Russian composer and pedagogue

Vasily Pavlovich Kalafati (Russian: Василий Павлович Калафати, Vasilij Pavlovič Kalafati; 10 February [O.S. 29 January] 1869, Yevpatoria, Crimea – 20 March 1942, near Leningrad) was a composer and pedagogue of Greek descent in the Russian Empire and later the Soviet Union.

Kalafati was a pupil of Nikolai Rimsky-Korsakov at the Saint Petersburg Conservatory, and would also teach composition and music theory there between 1907 and 1929, having been promoted to professor in 1923. His own students included Alexander Scriabin, Igor Stravinsky, and Heino Eller. He died during the German siege of Leningrad in World War II.

Although largely forgotten after his death, Kalafati was one of the most important composers in Russia during his lifetime. He composed in a style which resembled that of Rimsky-Korsakov and his most notable works were an opera Cygany (based on Pushkin's poem The Gypsies), a symphony in A minor, a symphonic poem Legenda (which won him a prize at the 1928 International Schubert Competition in Vienna), an overture, a polonaise for orchestra, chamber music, pieces for piano, as well as art songs. Pianist Mary-Victoria Voutsas recorded his works. Naxos released a cd of orchestral works including the Symphony and “Legenda”. (Naxos, 8.574132)
