= 1928 International Columbia Graphophone Competition =

American music competition

The 1928 International Columbia Graphophone Competition was a competition part-sponsored by the Columbia record company in honour of the centenary of the death of Franz Schubert. Its original aim was to encourage composers to produce completions of Schubert's 'Unfinished' Symphony but the rules were modified several times to allow the submission of original symphonic works. Preliminary rounds were judged on a country or area basis, and the winning works at this level were then forwarded to the final judging for the world prize, which took place in Vienna. Notable composers who gained prizes in the country categories included Vasily Kalafati, Havergal Brian, Czesław Marek and Franz Schmidt, but the overall prize, after a wrangle among the judges, was awarded to the Swedish composer Kurt Atterberg for his Sixth Symphony.

== Inception and changing rules ==
Organized jointly by the Gesellschaft der Musikfreunde in Vienna and the Columbia Graphophone Company of Britain and America, the competition was originally announced on 26 June 1927 as a contest for composers from around the world to complete Schubert's Symphony in B minor, D. 759 (the Unfinished). Between July 1927 and February 1928 the rules of entry were modified several times to allow the submission of original works rather than a completion of Schubert, and also to permit the use, if prospective completers wished, of Schubert's own sketches for the third movement of the Unfinished. Those composers who wished to submit a completion of Schubert's work were to use an orchestra no larger than that already employed in the existing movements of the Unfinished. As far as the submission of individual works was concerned, in October 1927 the organizers stipulated that these should be 'in two movements, composed in the Romantic spirit that animates Schubert's music'. Only a few weeks later this formulation was changed to 'symphonic works in one or more movements, presented as an apotheosis of the lyrical genius of Schubert'; it was also suggested, though not stipulated, that there could be non-symphonic works, as long as these were sets of variations on Schubert themes, but all works had to be for orchestra. Later still, a further revision of the rules stated that 'the compositions, apart from faultless formal structure, must be marked by the predominance of a vigorous melodic content, and the number of instruments employed must not substantially exceed the measure established by the classical orchestras of Schubert's time'.

== Submissions and zone judging ==
The contest was to be judged in two stages. "The World" (effectively Europe, the Americas, and the British Commonwealth) was divided into ten 'zones', each of which could award prizes for three works, the first prize being £150 sterling or $750, the second prize £50 or $250 and the third prize no money, but an 'honourable mention' (hochste Anerkennung). These 30 scores were then to be entered for the sole international first prize of £2,000 or $10,000, to be adjudicated in Vienna. The 'Zone' jurors, who judged the first stage, included such well-known personalities as Maurice Ravel, Thomas Beecham, Ottorino Respighi, and Karol Szymanowski.

As far as is known, despite the prestige of the competition, very few of the youngest generation of composers bothered to enter, especially those of a modernist persuasion. The terms of entry, and indeed the identity of many of the jurors, bespoke a highly conservative and traditionalist view of musical history. Nevertheless, several substantial figures of more senior generations participated in the competition, and not all their works were destined to be forgotten. At least 513 composers, and probably many more, submitted scores by the closing date. If the 30 or so winning entries in the first stage accurately reflect the proportion of original works to completions of Schubert, it would seem that about 20 per cent, i.e., something over 100 different "finishings" of the Unfinished, were submitted. Among the remaining 80 per cent of entries - the original works - there was a tremendous diversity of approach and character, and many submitted scores that had only the most tenuous connexion with the ideals outlined in the conditions of entry.

=== Examples ===
A full list of winners by zone is given by Paul Rapoport (see Sources, below). In the 'English' zone, for example, the first prize of £150 was divided between the composer-pianist Frank Merrick (who submitted a completion of the Schubert symphony) and John St. Anthony Johnson, for a symphonic movement called Pax Vobiscum. The second prize went to the composer Havergal Brian for the orchestral movements from his Gothic Symphony. (This symphony, which had evolved between 1919 and 1927, is famous for the gigantic orchestra and chorus employed in the choral finale that forms Part Two. It had clearly not been written as an entry for the competition, but as submitted by the composer, only the somewhat smaller manuscript for Part One, consisting of three more conventional orchestral movements, was deemed eligible to be adjudged as a stand-alone work.) In the Austrian section, the first prize was awarded to Franz Schmidt for his Third Symphony, the second to Hans Gál for his First Symphony and the third prize to a symphony by Moni Friedsohn. In the Scandinavian section, the first prize went to Kurt Atterberg of Sweden for his Sixth Symphony, the second to the Norwegian, Ludvig Irgens-Jensen, for his orchestral Passacaglia, and the third prize to a symphony by the Dane Jens Laursen Emborg.

== Final judging ==
From 19 to 23 June 1928 the 30 winning scores from the ten national zones were evaluated in Vienna by the International jury. This body consisted of one delegate from each of the zones plus an eleventh juror appointed in Vienna. The chairman was Alexander Glazunov; he was assisted by Franco Alfano, Alfred Bruneau, Walter Damrosch, Carl Nielsen, Franz Schalk, Max von Schillings, and Donald Tovey. The Polish delegate was Emil Młynarski; the eleventh, Viennese, delegate was Guido Adler. Since the deliberations of the jury were never published, they have been the subject of much rumour. It was agreed that all the completions of Schubert's Unfinished should be ruled out and the judging devoted only to the original works. The sole international prize was awarded to the Sixth Symphony of Kurt Atterberg. Vasily Kalafati received a second place acknowledgment for his work Legende, Op. 20. Atterberg's Symphony received two recordings at the time (conducted by Beecham on Columbia, and by Atterberg himself with the Berlin Philharmonic on Polydor). The works by the joint UK prize winners Frank Merrick and John St. Anthony Johnson were also recorded by Columbia, Charles Haubiel's Karma was recorded in the USA, and the joint first prize winners for France/Belgium/Switzerland (by Gustave Guillemoteau and Henry Ryder) were recorded in Paris by Columbia (the Conservatoire Orchestra, conducted by Philippe Gaubert).

Kurt Atterberg's Symphony was eventually reviewed with a fair amount of derision by international critics as a particularly weak and derivative specimen of contemporary music. It is clear that Atterberg's symphony was in direct competition with two other scores, namely Franz Schmidt's Third Symphony and Czesław Marek's Sinfonia, because both of these pieces - though they received no prize, no money and no recording - merited an 'honourable mention' in the final judgment. Other pieces may however have been involved in the final balance. Sources within the Columbia Graphophone company released unattributable stories to suggest that Havergal Brian's Gothic Symphony, which Donald Tovey as British delegate certainly considered a masterpiece, was also evaluated, as well as a set of symphonic variations entitled Karma by the American Charles Haubiel. This account would square with a report in The New York Times (29 November 1928) which suggested that the jury were divided on four scores which were considered outstanding but eventually rejected as 'in a modernistic vein inappropriate to the occasion', and that Atterberg's Symphony was awarded the prize as the best of the others, with (it seems) five jurors dissenting and the deadlock broken by the casting vote of Glazunov. Yet Atterberg's Symphony No. 6 is by no means the mere pastiche that it was represented as in contemporary reviews; and one might have expected that its rather prominent vein of polytonality would have rendered it equally 'inappropriate to the occasion'.

== Sources ==
- Paul Rapoport, Havergal Brian and his Symphony "The Gothic", Masters Thesis, University of Illinois at Urbana-Champaign (University Microfilms International, 1972)
- Malcolm MacDonald, 'Czesław Marek and his Sinfonia' in Chris Walton and Antonio Baldassare (eds.), Musik im Exil: Die Schweiz und das Ausland 1918-45 (Berne: Peter Lang, 2005) ISBN 3-03910-492-6.
- Havergal Brian's letters to Ernest Newman, edited by David Jenkins, Newsletter 175 (September–October 2004).
