= Sonata in B minor (Atterberg) =

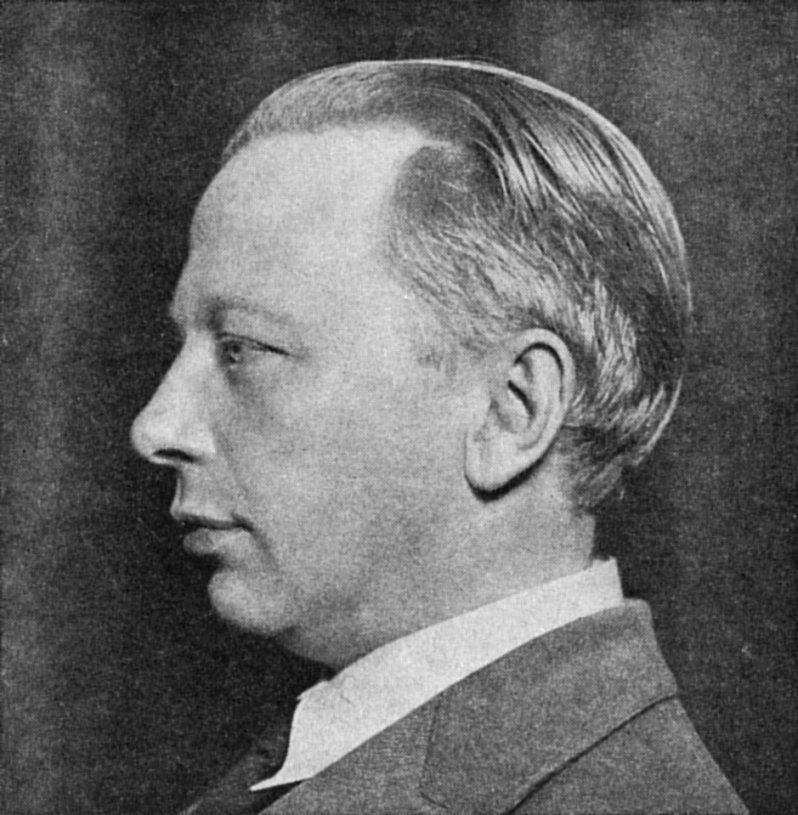
Kurt Atterberg

The Sonata in B minor, Op. 27, is the only sonata written by Swedish composer Kurt Atterberg. It can be performed by either a string instrument (violin, viola, cello) or horn with piano.

== History ==
The sonata was completed in 1925. Originally intended for cello (the composer's instrument), it was published in 1930 as a sonata for cello, viola or violin and piano. The cello version was played by Atterberg himself in the early winter of 1925 in the Organ Hall of the Royal Academy of Music. A performance at an ISCM concert followed a few months later.

The piece was adapted by the composer for horn and piano in 1955, at the request of Domenico Ceccarossi.

== Structure ==
The sonata is in 3 traditional movements:

1. Allegro
2. Adagio molto
3. Allegro energico, poco pesante

The broad first movement follows romantic tradition, the second bears influence of Swedish folklore, and the third is a virtuoso finale.

== Recordings ==
- (1993) Eszter Perenyi (violin) and Ilona Prunyi — Marco Polo 8.223404
- (1993) Imre Magyari (horn) and Ilona Prunyi — Marco Polo 8.223405
- (1997) Werner Thomas-Mifune (cello) and Carmen Piazzini — Koch-Schwann 3-1585-2
