= Czesław Marek =

Polish composer, pianist and piano teacher

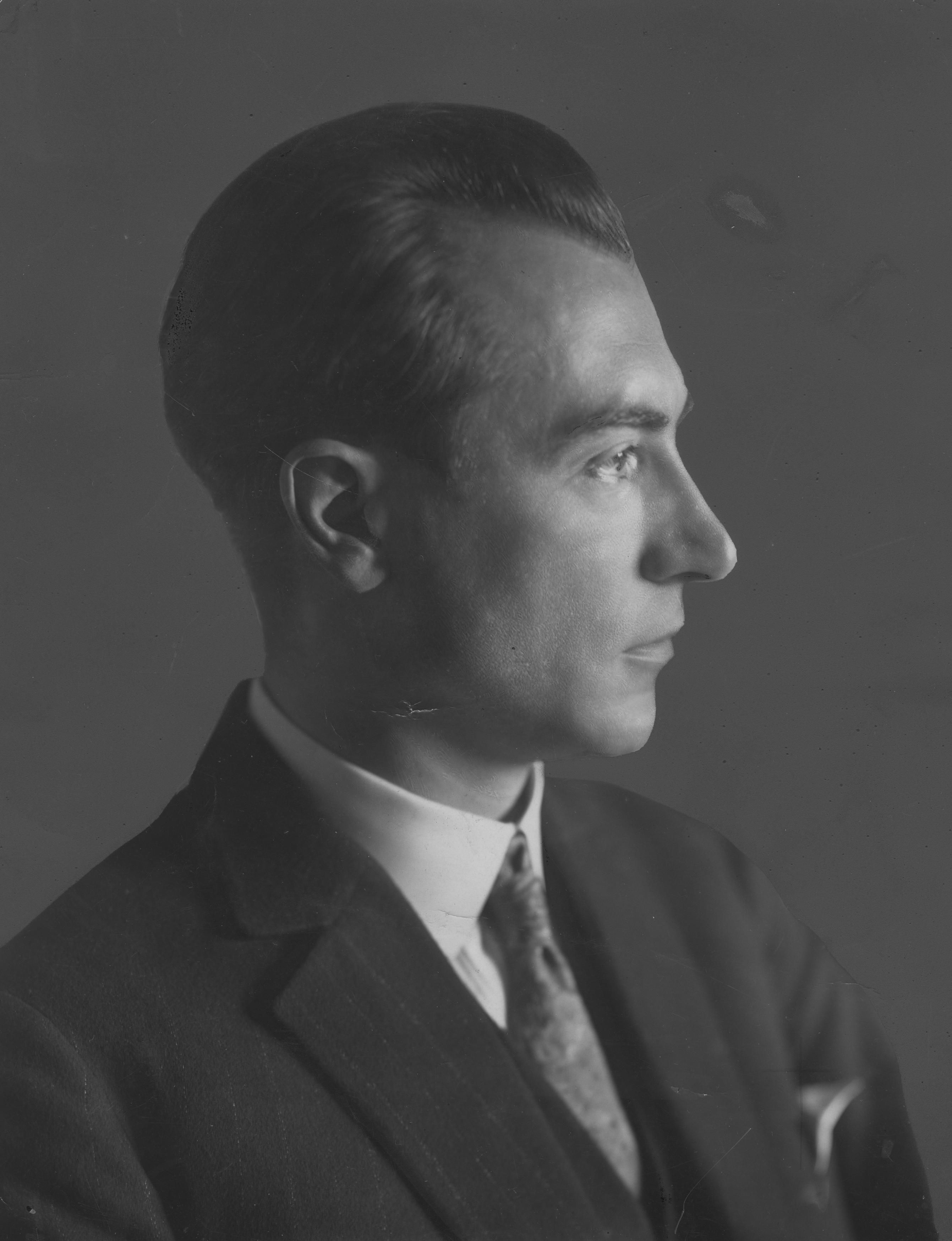
Czesław Marek

Czesław Marek (1891–1985) was a Polish composer, pianist, and piano teacher who settled in Switzerland during World War I.

== Life ==
Born in the town of Przemyśl in Eastern Galicia, near Lwów (now Lviv in Ukraine), Marek studied in that city and then later in Vienna, where he became a private pupil of Theodor Leschetizky. He studied composition with Karl Weigl and later, in Strasbourg, with Hans Pfitzner. He was appointed to a Piano professorship in Lwów in 1914 but three months later the German invasion of Galicia and their battles with the Russian armies forced Marek and his parents to flee to Prague, where he was assisted by Alexander Zemlinsky. In January 1915 he travelled to Switzerland and settled in Zürich, where he became friendly with Busoni and married the violinist Claire Hofer. Up to 1924 he made a sustained attempt to carve out a career as a concert pianist. Though he afterwards withdrew from the concert stage, Marek continued to teach and compose. He died in Zurich aged 94.

== Music career ==
Among his most significant compositions are the fugal Triptychon, op. 8 (1913, rev. 1923) for piano, the one-movement Sinfonia, op. 28, for large orchestra, which won first prize in the Polish section of the 1928 International Columbia Graphophone Competition celebrating the centenary of Schubert's death, and two Polish song-cycles for voice and chamber orchestra on folk texts. In the 1930s he produced a number of works for harp, including a transcription of Ravel's Ondine for two harps; he also wrote several works in a jazz style. He ceased to compose during the 1940s but in 1972 published Lehre des Klavierspiels on the art of piano-playing. The first part of this work originally appeared in 1961 under the title Was ist "musikalisch"?.

Posthumous interest in Marek's music has grown; recordings of the majority of his works were issued on compact disc in the late 1990s (on the Guild label) and are now also available digitally.
