= Aladdin (Atterberg opera) =

Opera by Kurt Atterberg

- Opera by Kurt Atterberg
- Einar Andersson as Aladdin in the 1941 original production of the opera.
- Librettist: Bruno Hardt-Warden and Ignaz Michael Welleminsky
- Language: Swedish, German
- Based on: Aladdin
- Premiere: 18 March 1941; Royal Swedish Opera, Stockholm

Aladdin or Aladin, Op. 43, is an opera by the Swedish composer Kurt Atterberg, to a libretto written by Bruno Hardt-Warden and Ignaz Michael Welleminsky. Two versions exist, in Swedish and German. The opera is based on the story, "Aladdin's Magic Lamp" from One Thousand and One Nights. It was first performed on 18 March 1941 at the Royal Swedish Opera, Stockholm.

== Original idea ==
The idea for the composition was born in August 1936 when the composer met the librettists in Garmisch. The libretto was largely finished when Atterberg began composing the piano score on 15 July 1937. On 24 August 1940 the piano score was finalized and Atterberg started with the orchestration, which he completed on 28 January 1941. However, the overture was only written later for the German premiere. Together with his wife, Atterberg translated the German original of the libretto into Swedish. As Welleminsky was Jewish, it was not possible for him to be named by the publisher as a librettist.

The composing took so long because Atterberg had a heavy workload, involving conducting and other tasks, but also because of the outbreak of the Second World War.

== History of performances ==
Ruth Moberg as princess Laila in the original 1941 production.

The premiere of Aladdin took place in 1941 at the Royal Swedish Opera of Stockholm in Swedish and was conducted by S. A. Axelson. Several members of the Swedish royal house were attending the performance, including the king Gustaf V of Sweden. Atterberg was satisfied with the production, except for the dances. However, the opera was not the success they hoped for and was put on only eleven times. The first act of the world premiere was broadcast by the Swedish Broadcasting Service, and was recorded on an acetate disc. Together with a 1968 recording of the overture, this remained the only recording of the opera until 2017 (see below).

Einar Andersson (Aladdin), Ruth Moberg (Laila), Joël Berglund (Muluk), Björn Forsell, Arne Wirén, Leon Björker and Folke Johnson performed in the world premiere.

The German premiere took place on 18 October 1941 at the Theater Chemnitz. Although the artistic director ecstatically stated: "Applause broke out right after the overture and increased from scene to scene, culminating in a standing ovation. I believe in the lasting success of this work.", the success was modest and there were no performances ever since.

On 11 March 2017, only the third performance worldwide was staged at the Staatstheater Braunschweig under the musical supervision of Jonas Alber, which was broadcast via Deutschlandfunk Kultur and was received with excitement by the critics. The leading roles were performed by Michael Ha (Aladdin), Solen Mainguene (Laila), Frank Blees (Nazzreddin), Selcuk Hakan Tirasoglu (beggar/Dschababirah) and Oleksandr Pushniak (Muluk). Due to political correctness the libretto differs from the original one in 1941 and places the plot in the present, into a former central Asian Soviet Union.

== Music ==
Since his first composition, Op. 1 from 1913, Atterberg had repeatedly tried to incorporate oriental motifs into his works, without lasting success. He adopted numerous ideas from those compositions for Aladdin.

The opera employs a late-romantic-dramatic sound language. "The opera is dominated by a bright timbre, large melodic lines and sprinklings of oriental folklore". Some critics regard the opera as a "musical cross of the Orientalism in Nikolai Rimsky-Korsakov's operas together with string-movements and background choirs from American pop-songs". While Atterberg's symphonies are still performed, his operas, including Aladdin, fell into oblivion.

== Instruments ==
The opera's orchestra consisted of the following instruments:

- Woodwinds: two flutes (with piccolo), two oboes (with cor anglais), two clarinets (with E♭ clarinet and bass clarinet), two bassoons
- Brasss: four French horns, three trumpets, three trombones, tuba
- Percussion: timpani, drum kit (three players): oriental timpani, two triangles, tambourin, snare drum, bass drum, cymbal, tam-tam
- Keyboards: Piano, celesta
- Brass band: two oboes, two clarinets, three trumpets
- Strings: harp, six violins 1, four violins 2, three violas, three celli, two double basses

== Recordings ==
- Aladin Michael Ha, Frank Blees, Solen Mainguene, Oleksandr Pushniak, Selcuk Hakan Tirasoglu, Chor des Staatstheaters Braunschweig, Staatsorchester Braunschweig, Jonas Alber. 2CD CPO, recorded 2017, released 2023
