= String Quartet No. 19 (Spohr) =

String quartet by Louis Spohr

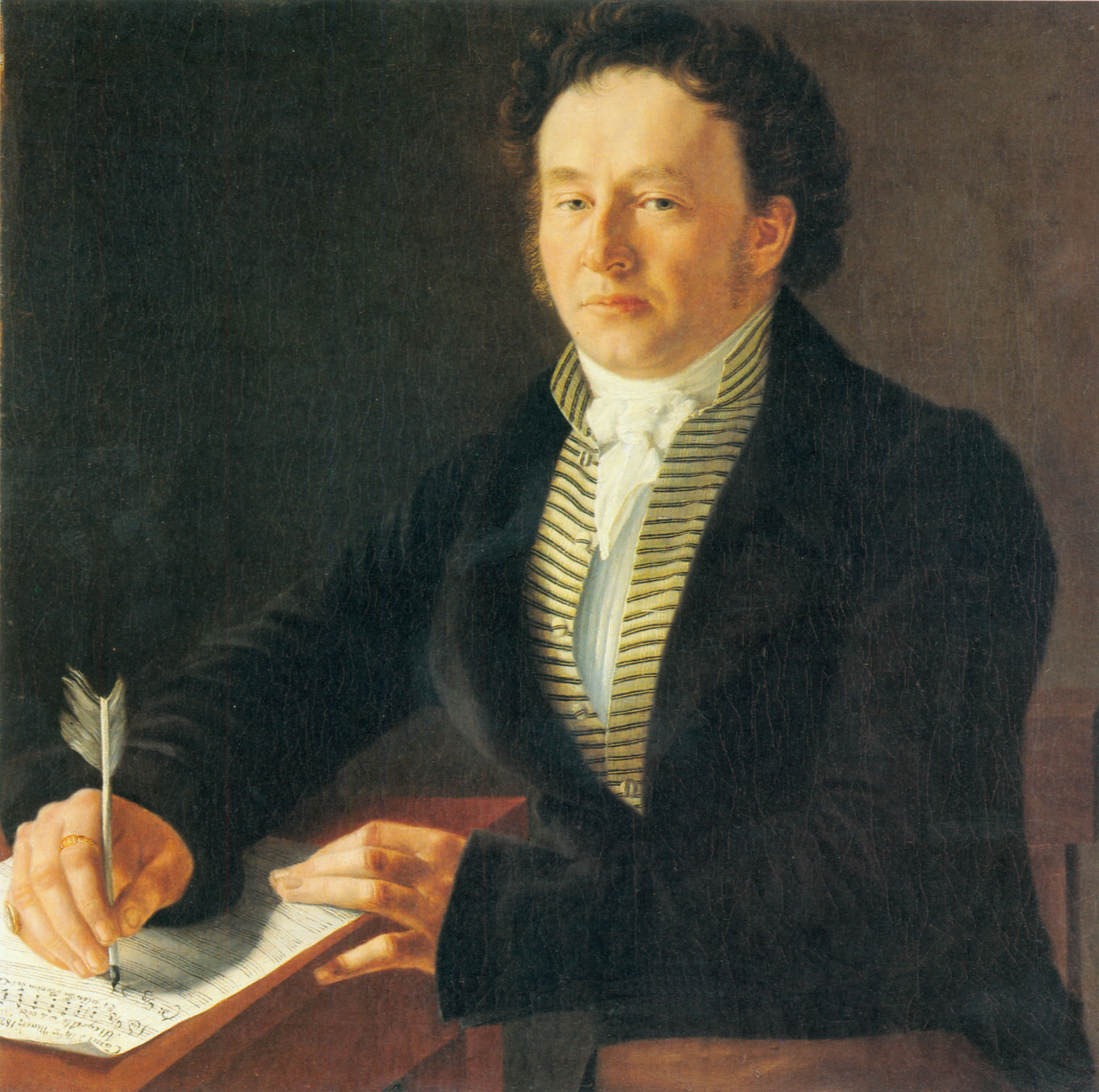
Portrait of Louis Spohr in 1824

Louis Spohr's String Quartet No. 19 ("Quatuor brillant") in A major, Op. 68, was composed by Spohr in 1823. Like a concerto, the work is designed to display a soloist's skills, but in a more intimate setting than the concert hall.

== Movements ==
The string quartet is in three movement form:

1. Allegro moderato
2. Larghetto
3. Rondo: Allegretto
