= String Quartet No. 18 (Spohr) =

String quartet by Louis Spohr

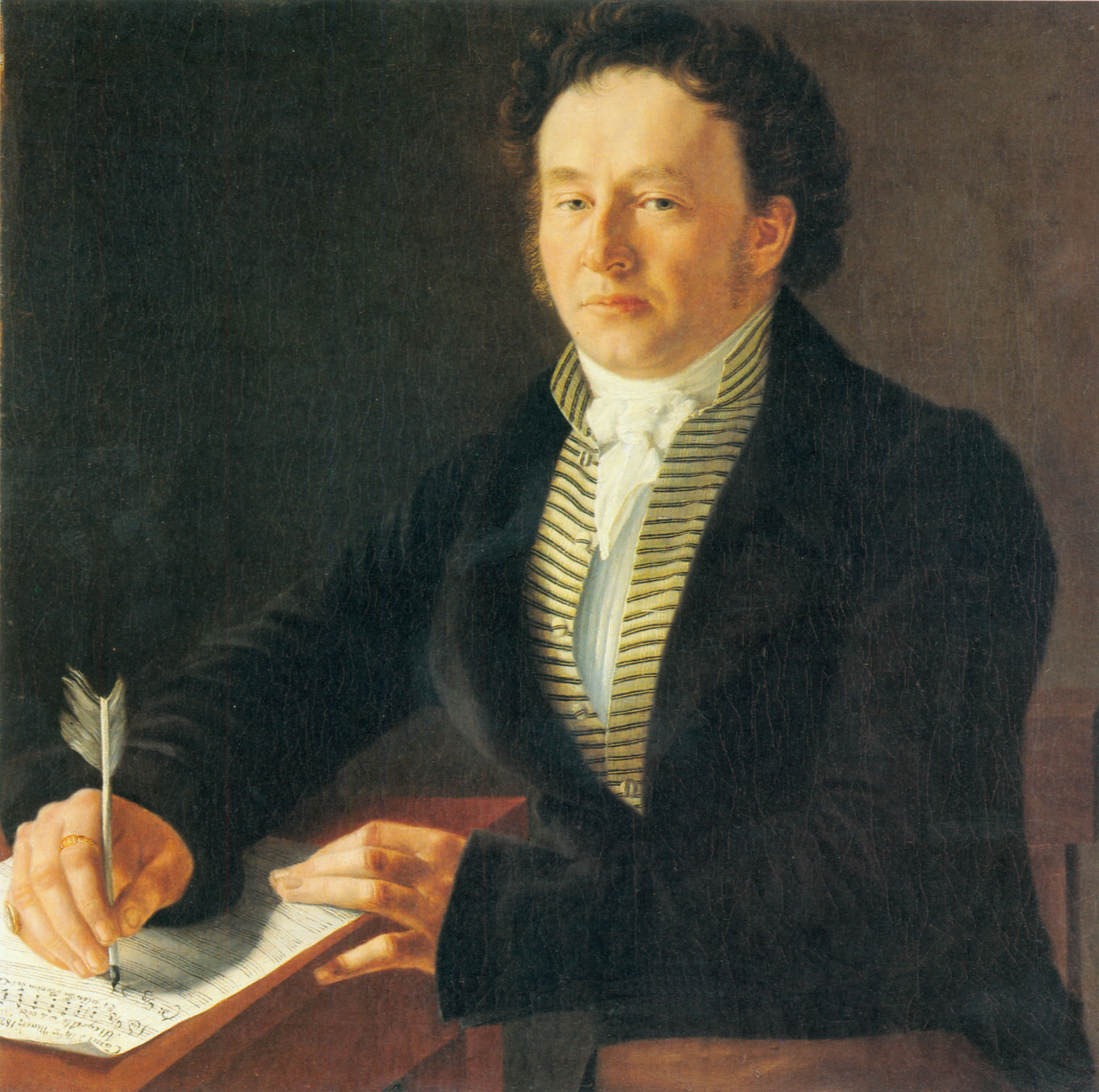
Portrait of Louis Spohr in 1824

Louis Spohr's String Quartet No. 18 ("Quatuor brillant") in B minor, Op. 61, is one of eight such works the composer wrote between 1806 and 1835, and was published about 1824. Like a concerto, the work is designed to display a soloist's skills but in a more intimate setting than the concert hall.

== Movements ==
This quartet is in three movement form:

1. Allegro moderato
2. Adagio
3. Allegretto
