= Kurt Atterberg =

Swedish composer and engineer

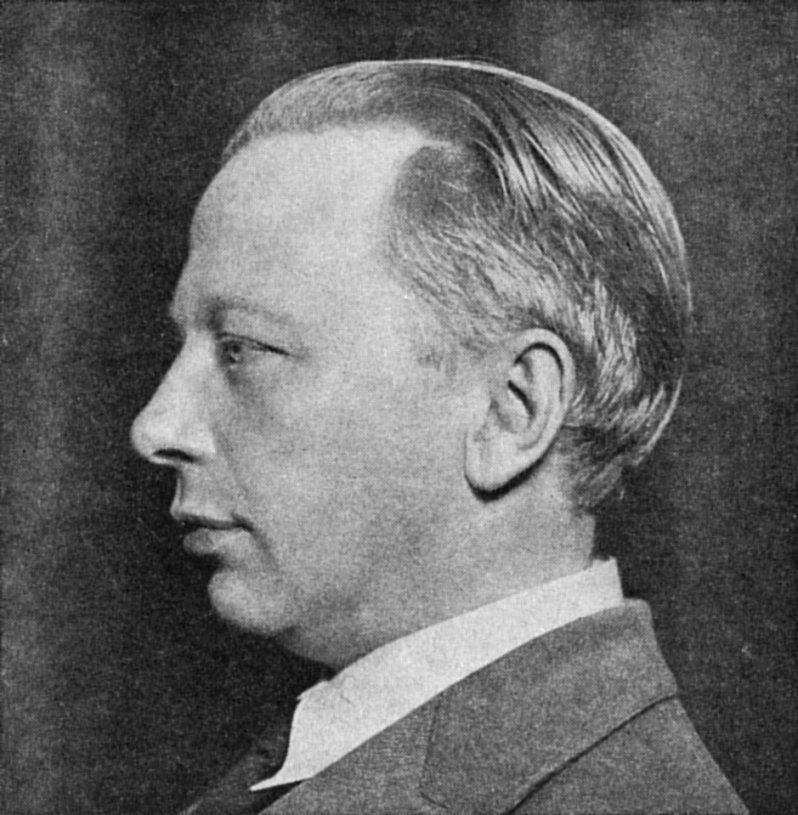
Kurt Atterberg

Kurt Magnus Atterberg (Swedish: [²atːɛrbærj], 12 December 1887 – 15 February 1974) was a Swedish composer and civil engineer. Along with Ture Rangström, he was one the foremost Swedish composers of the generation succeeding Wilhelm Peterson-Berger, Wilhelm Stenhammar and Hugo Alfvén. Atterberg is best known for his symphonies, operas, and ballets.

== Biography ==
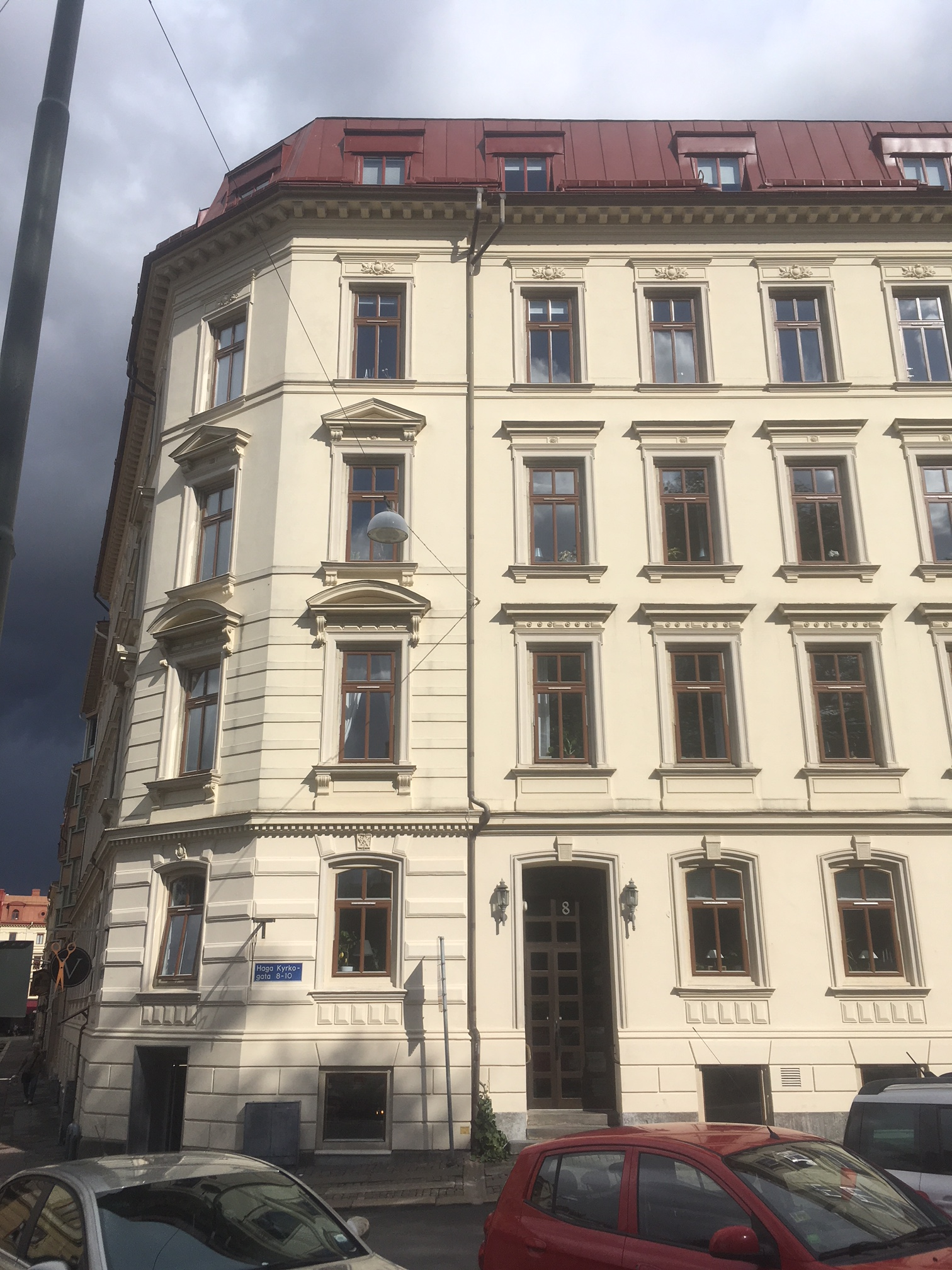
Haga kyrkogata 8, Gothenburg. Atterberg was born on the third floor.

Atterberg was born in Gothenburg. His father was Anders Johan Atterberg, engineer; his uncle was the chemist Albert Atterberg. His mother, Elvira Uddman, was the daughter of a famous male opera singer.

In 1902, Atterberg began learning the cello, having been inspired by a concert by the Brussels String Quartet, featuring a performance of Beethoven's String Quartet No. 8. Six years later he became a performer in the Stockholm Concert Society, now known as the Royal Stockholm Philharmonic Orchestra, as well as publishing his first completed work, the Rhapsody for Piano and Orchestra, Op. 1. His String Quartet No. 1 in D major, Op. 2, soon followed.

While already studying electrical engineering at the Royal Institute of Technology, Atterberg also enrolled at the Royal College of Music, Stockholm in 1910 with a score of his Rhapsody and an incomplete version of his Symphony No. 1. There he studied composition and orchestration under the composer Andreas Hallén. He earned his engineering diploma a year later, as well as being awarded a State Music Fellowship. He made his conducting debut at a concert in Gothenburg in 1912, premiering his first symphony and the Concert Overture in A minor, Op. 4.

Although continuing to compose and conduct, Atterberg enjoyed a fulfilling career in several different organisations. He accepted a post at the Swedish Patent and Registration Office in 1912, going on to become a head of department in 1936 and working there until his retirement in 1968.

Possibly Atterberg's greatest success was his triumph in the 1928 International Columbia Graphophone Competition, organized to commemorate the 100-year anniversary of Franz Schubert's death. Eventually, his sixth symphony was chosen out of 500 submissions as the winning work, over Franz Schmidt's 3rd symphony and Czeslaw Marek's Sinfonia brevis. It was performed all over the Western world in subsequent years, among others by Thomas Beecham and Arturo Toscanini.

Atterberg died on 15 February 1974 in Stockholm, aged 86, and was buried there in the Northern Cemetery.

== Alleged ties to Nazi Germany ==
Both before and during the Nazi era, Atterberg worked with German composers and music organizations with the aim of strengthening Swedish-German musical relations. He sometimes conducted his own works with famous orchestras in Germany and several famous conductors also performed Atterberg's symphonies. Atterberg never hesitated to pass on the German contacts he had made over the years to his Swedish colleagues or to work to have Swedish works performed in Germany. In this way, Albert Henneberg could collaborate with Fritz Tutenberg, whom Atterberg had known since a music festival in Kiel in 1926, and together with him write operas for the opera in Chemnitz. From 1935–1938, Atterberg was also general secretary of the Permanent Council for the International Co-operation of Composers (Ständiger Rat für die internationale Zusammenarbeit der Komponisten), founded by Richard Strauss.

Racial identity references are found in correspondence between Atterberg and composer Moses Pergament, a music critic for the Svenska Dagbladet. In a letter to Pergament in 1923, Atterberg writes: "I could not have dreamed that you would launch yourself as a Swedish composer […] So far, you are a purely Jewish composer for the sake of principle - why not in name as well?" The contradiction between the composers was rooted in their diametrically different artistic orientations and the fact that Atterberg was a leading personality in Swedish musical life and an advocate of the romantic national identity. Pergament on the other hand, belonged to a more modernist phalanx, together with Gösta Nystroem and Hilding Rosenberg.

After the end of World War II, Atterberg was accused of being a Nazi sympathizer. At his own request, an investigation was set up by the Royal Academy of Music. The investigation could not confirm suspicions of Nazi sympathies. However, after the war, Atterberg seems to have been marginalized and ostracized by at least some of his fellow Swedish composers.

== Organizer and critic ==
Atterberg co-founded the Society of Swedish Composers in 1918, alongside other prominent composers such as Ture Rangström, Wilhelm Stenhammar and Hugo Alfvén. Six years later he was elected president of the society, maintaining the position until 1947. At a similar time, he became president of the Svenska Tonsättares Internationella Musikbyrå, which he also helped to found, and of which his presidency lasted until 1943. Other jobs taken on by Atterberg included his work as a music critic for the Stockholms Tidningen from 1919 to 1957, and as secretary of the Royal Swedish Academy of Music from 1940 to 1953.

== Musical style ==
Atterberg composed in a romantic style that may be compared to that of the musicians of the Nordic nationalist current, in particular Edvard Grieg or Jean Sibelius. Other important influences include (according to himself) Brahms, Reger, and several Russian composers including Tchaikovsky and Rimsky-Korsakov.

== Assessment ==
Together with Ture Rangström, Atterberg must be considered a leading composer of the second generation of Swedish late romantics and thus continued the tradition founded by Wilhelm Peterson-Berger, Wilhelm Stenhammar and Hugo Alfvén. He was a proponent of the idea that romantic music should portray and strengthen national identity, while opponents defined the character of modern music as transnational and cosmopolitan. While his five operas have fallen into neglect, the nine symphonies (ten when including the 1953 Sinfonia per archi) are once again being heard more frequently, and have been recorded several times.

== Works ==
Atterberg composed nine symphonies (or ten if the Symphony for Strings, Op. 53, is included). His Ninth Symphony (entitled Sinfonia Visionaria) was, like Beethoven's, scored for orchestra and chorus with vocal soloists. His output also includes six concertante works (including his Rhapsody, Op. 1, and a cello concerto), nine orchestral suites, three string quartets, a Sonata in B minor, five operas and two ballets.

For the 100th anniversary of the death of Schubert in 1928, the Columbia Graphophone Company sponsored a worldwide symphony competition in which composers were to write a symphony completing, or inspired by, Schubert's "Unfinished" Symphony. Atterberg entered his Symphony No. 6 in C major, Op. 31, and was awarded first prize, winning $10,000. The symphony, which was later known as the "Dollar Symphony", was recorded by Sir Thomas Beecham. The symphony was performed by Arturo Toscanini in 1943, during an NBC Symphony Orchestra broadcast concert; Atterberg praised the performance upon hearing the recorded broadcast.

On February 22, 2005, CPO Records released a complete box set of recordings of Atterberg's symphonies, as well as the symphonic poem Älven – Från Fjällen till Havet (The River – From the Mountains to the Sea). The recordings were performed by the NDR Radiophilharmonie, Hamburg, Radio-Sinfonie-Orchester Stuttgart and the Radio-Sinfonie-Orchester Frankfurt, all conducted by Finnish conductor Ari Rasilainen. Between 2013 and 2016, a second complete set of symphonies, with added material, was recorded by the Gothenburg Symphony Orchestra under the direction of Neeme Järvi and released on the Chandos label.

== Personal life ==
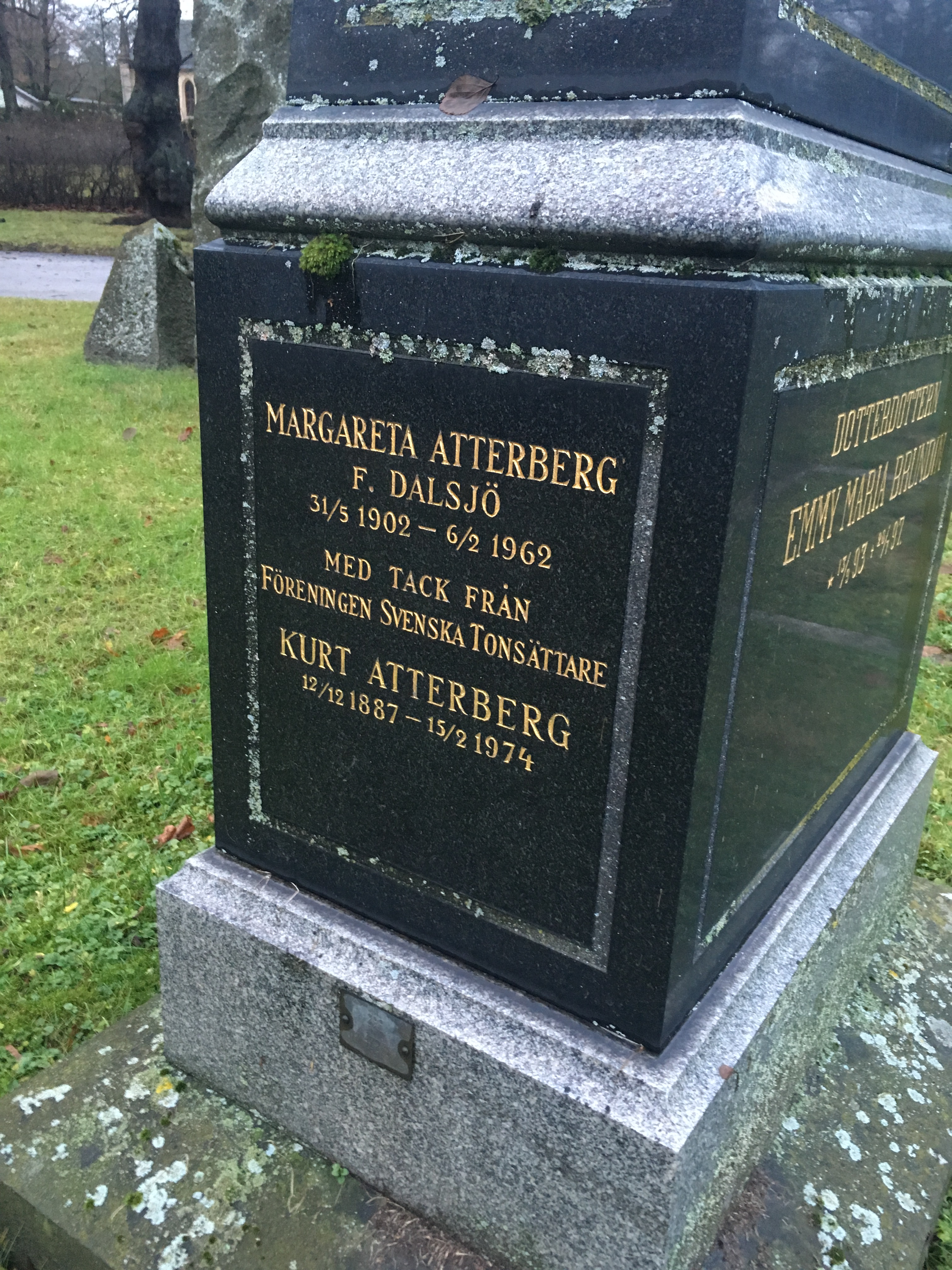
The tomb marker of Kurt Atterberg at the Northern Cemetery, Solna, Stockholm.

Atterberg married twice, first Ella Peterson, a pianist, in 1915; they divorced eight years later. His second marriage was to Margareta Dalsjö in 1925, which lasted until her death in 1962.
