= Žiželice (Louny District) =

- Municipality
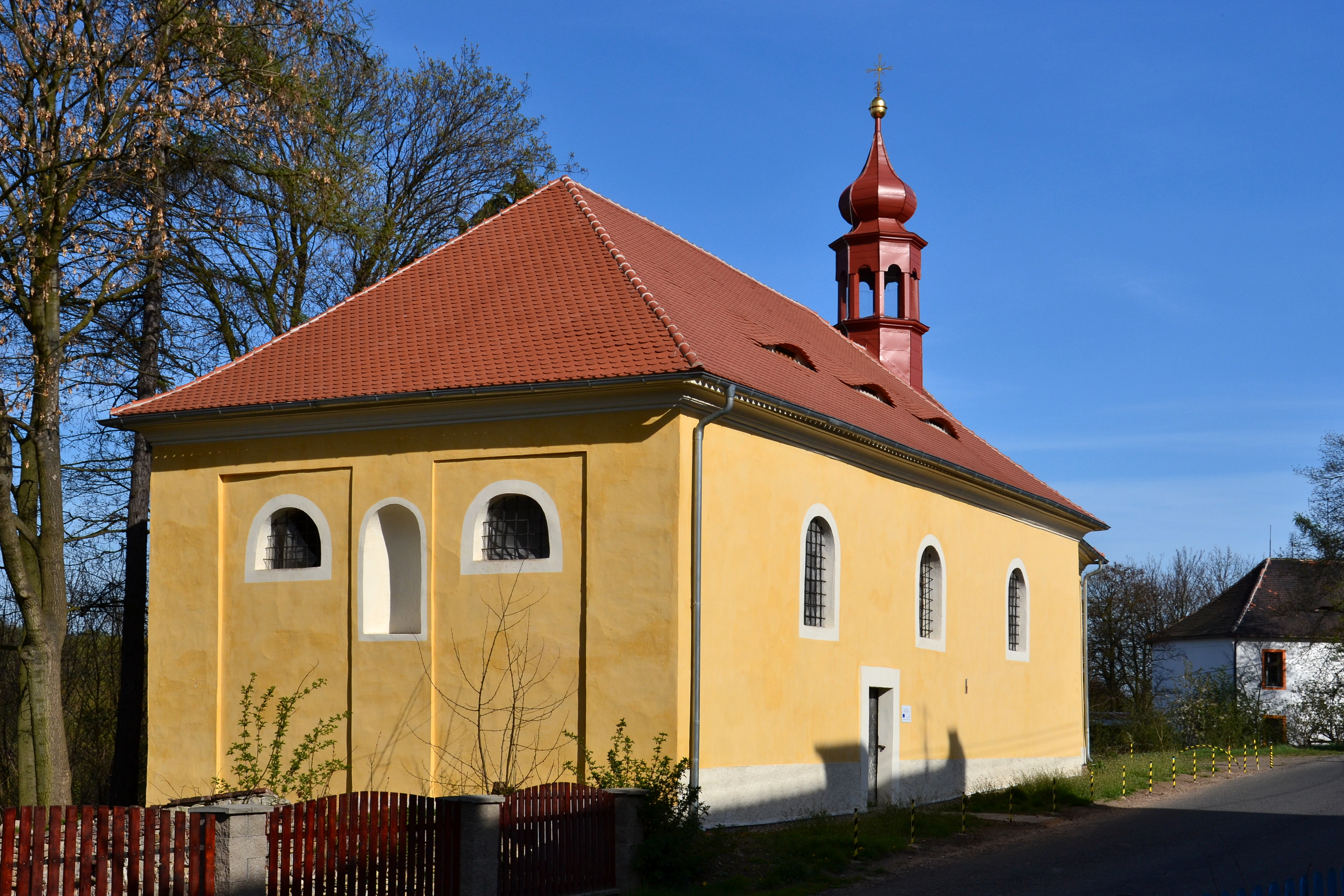
- Church of Saint Lawrence in Hořetice

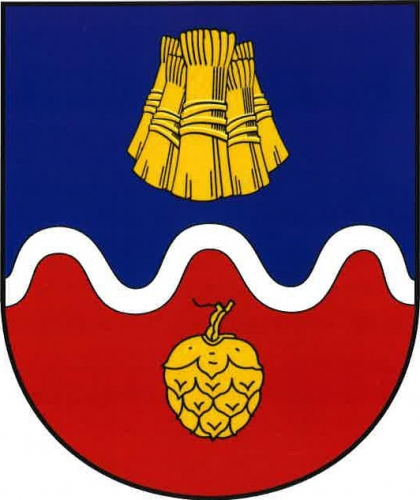
- Flag Coat of arms

- Location in the Czech Republic
- Coordinates: 50°22′3″N 13°32′24″E
- Country: Czech Republic
- Region: Ústí nad Labem
- District: Louny
- First mentioned: 1318

Area
  - Total: 14.76 km^{2} (5.70 sq mi)
- Elevation: 231 m (758 ft)

Population (2026-01-01)
  - Total: 430
  - Density: 29/km^{2} (75/sq mi)
- Time zone: UTC+1 (CET)
  - Summer (DST): UTC+2 (CEST)
- Postal code: 438 01
- Website: www.obeczizelice.cz

Žiželice (German: Schießelitz) is a municipality and village in Louny District in the Ústí nad Labem Region of the Czech Republic. It has about 400 inhabitants.

Žiželice lies approximately 19 kilometres (12 mi) west of Louny, 48 km (30 mi) south-west of Ústí nad Labem, and 70 km (43 mi) north-west of Prague.

== Administrative division ==
Žiželice consists of four municipal parts (in brackets population according to the 2021 census):

- Žiželice (209)
- Hořetice (74)
- Přívlaky (14)
- Stroupeč (87)

== Demographics ==
Historical population
Year	Pop.	±%
1869	970	—
1880	974	+0.4%
1890	1,005	+3.2%
1900	1,095	+9.0%
1910	1,106	+1.0%
1921	1,077	−2.6%
1930	1,081	+0.4%
1950	531	−50.9%
1961	595	+12.1%
1970	525	−11.8%
1980	606	+15.4%
1991	404	−33.3%
2001	446	+10.4%
2011	409	−8.3%
2021	384	−6.1%
Source: Censuses

== Notable people ==
- Joseph Karl Bernard (1780–1850), Austrian journalist and librettist
