= Clarinet Concerto No. 1 (Spohr) =

Musical composition by Louis Spohr

The Clarinet Concerto No. 1 in C minor, Op. 26, was composed by Louis Spohr between fall of 1808 and early 1809, and published in 1812. The concerto was the first of four that Spohr would compose in his lifetime, all of which were dedicated to the German clarinet virtuoso Johann Simon Hermstedt.

Spohr was inspired to write the concerto after meeting Hermstedt in Sondershausen and performing the Mozart Clarinet Quintet with him, with Spohr playing the first violin part. Spohr began work on the Concerto No. 1 soon after and finished it in January 1809. While Spohr was familiar with the range of the clarinet, he was not aware of its limitations and was willing to alter the score according to Hermstedt's advice. However, Hermstedt liked the score the way it was and decided to alter his own instrument to be able to play the piece. The result was an instrument with thirteen keys instead of the usual five. Thus, the composition of the concerto could be seen as a driving factor in the clarinet's development throughout the 19th century.

The concerto was premiered by Hermstedt in June 1809 and was received with much enthusiasm. Allgemeine musikalische Zeitung, then the leading musical magazine in Germany, praised both the composer and the performer in its review:

"As no composition whatever existed in which this excellent artist could display all the superiority of his playing, Herr Concertmeister Spohr of Gotha has written one for him; and, setting aside this special purpose, it belongs to the most spirited and beautiful music which this justly famous master has ever written."

== Movements ==
The concerto consists of three movements:

1. Adagio – Allegro (in C minor and sonata form, ends in C major)
2. Adagio (in A♭ major and modified sonata form without development; only the solo clarinet, violins, and cellos play in this movement, with all other instruments tacet)
3. Rondo (Vivace) (in C minor and in sonata rondo form) – The overall form is "First Subject in C minor – Secondary Subject in E♭ major – First Subject in C minor – Development in A♭ major – Secondary Subject in C major – First Subject in C minor – Coda in C minor". Unlike many classical works, the finale fades away in C minor, instead of ending with loud chords.
