= String Quartet No. 3 (Spohr) =

String quartet by Louis Spohr

Louis Spohr's String Quartet No. 3 ("Quatuor brillant") in D minor, Op. 11, was completed in 1806, then published in 1808. It is the first of eight quatuors brillants written by Spohr. Inspired by similar works written by Viotti and Rode, the composition is a mini-concerto, written to provide the composer with the means of demonstrating his skills with a violin in a more intimate setting than a concert hall.

== Movements ==
This quartet is in three movement form:

1. Allegro moderato
2. Adagio
3. Rondo
