= Jessonda =

Opera by Louis Spohr

- Grand opera by Louis Spohr
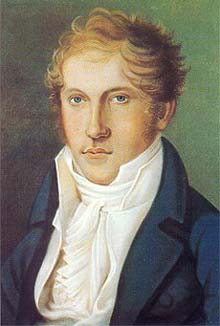
- Louis Spohr, self-portrait
- Librettist: Eduard Heinrich Gehe
- Language: German
- Based on: Antoine-Marin Lemierre's La veuve du Malabar
- Premiere: 28 July 1823; Kurfürstliches Hoftheater, Kassel

Jessonda is a grand opera (Große Oper) by Louis Spohr, written in 1822. The German libretto was written by Eduard Heinrich Gehe, based on Antoine-Marin Lemierre's 1770 play La veuve du Malabar ou L'Empire des coutumes.

Spohr had been newly appointed Hofkapellmeister in Kassel. He had reservations about Weber's recently performed Der Freischütz, and sought a subject that was poetic and uncomplicated, avoiding, in his setting, any spoken dialogue. He was opposed to the use of speech on mundane subjects in an operatic context. Ballets and spectacle were provided in set pieces that might also attract ordinary theatre-goers, in a German form of grand opera.

== Performance history ==
The first performance was at the Kurfürstliches Hoftheater in Kassel on 28 July 1823 under the direction of the composer.

This opera was performed regularly up to about 1860. While the overture to Jessonda may be heard today in concert performance, the opera itself no longer holds the place it once did in the operatic repertoire.

In February 1980, the Oxford University Opera Club performed this opera in the Oxford Playhouse.

== Roles ==
Roles, voice types, premiere cast
Role	Voice type	Premiere cast, 28 July 1823 Conductor: Louis Spohr
Jessonda, widow of a Rajah	soprano	Katinka Braun / Wilhelmine Schröder-Devrient
Amazili, her sister	soprano	Sophie Roland/Beltheim
Nadori, a young Brahmin	tenor	Samuel Friedrich Gerstäcker
Pedro Lopez, Portuguese colonel	tenor	Johann Gottfried Bergmann
Tristan d'Acunha, Portuguese general	baritone	Franz Hauser/Keller
Dandau, chief Brahmin	bass	Eduard Berthold /Friedrich Sebastian Mayer
Indian officer	tenor	Johann Ludwig Tourny
First dancer	soprano	
Second dancer	soprano	

== Synopsis ==
In this opera the heroine, Jessonda, widow of the Rajah, must be burned to death on his funeral pyre. Before her marriage she had been in love with a Portuguese general. A young Brahmin, Nadori, is sent from the Hindu temple to bring Jessonda the order for her death, as dictated by their customs. However, he falls in love with her sister, Amazili.

The Portuguese forces that are camped outside the city are led by Tristan d'Acunha, who has sworn that Indian customs will be preserved. Nadori has vowed to save Jessonda and Tristan now discovers that she is his long lost love. The Indian breach of the truce allows Tristan to act and Jessonda is rescued in the nick of time, before Dandau, the chief Brahmin, can carry out the intended sacrifice.
