= Faust (Spohr) =

1816 opera by Louis Spohr

- Opera by Louis Spohr
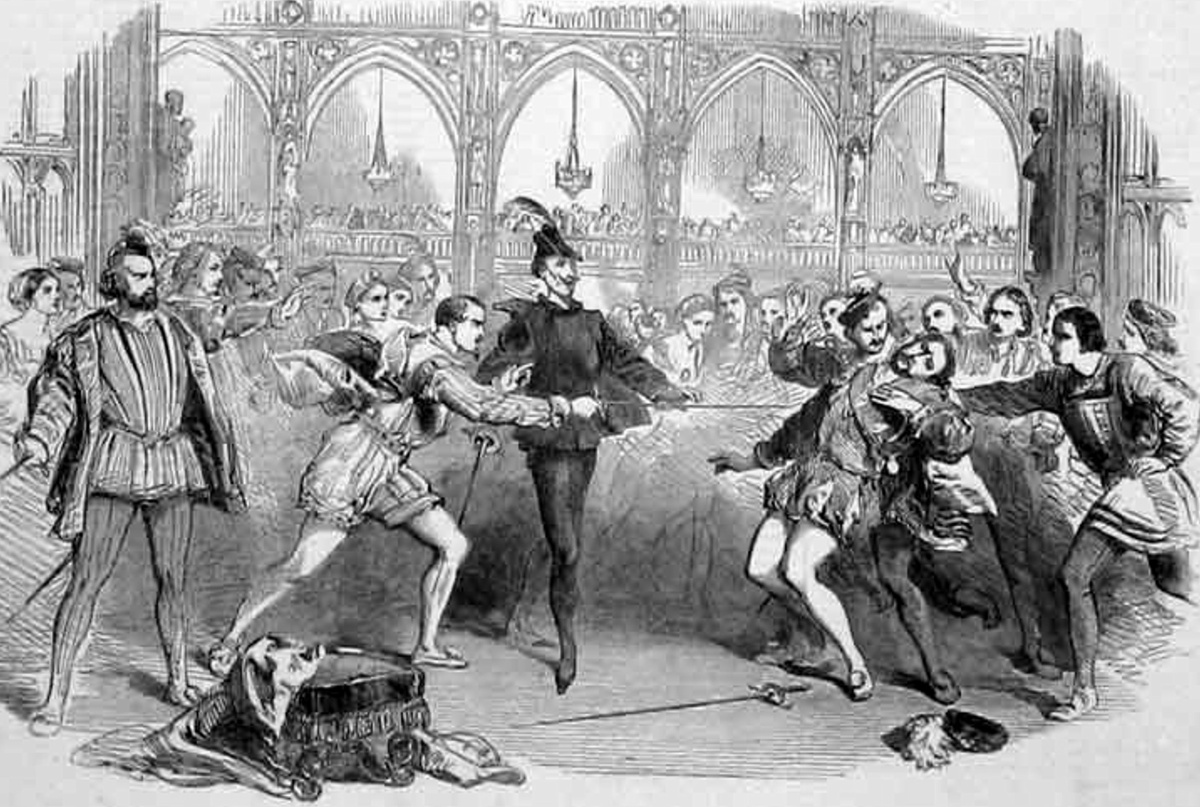
- Faust at the Royal Italian Opera, from The Illustrated London News Supplement, 31 July 1852
- Librettist: Joseph Karl Bernard
- Language: German
- Based on: legend of Faust
- Premiere: 1 September 1816; Estates Theatre in Prague

Faust is an opera by the German composer Louis Spohr. The libretto, by Joseph Karl Bernard, is based on the legend of Faust; it is not influenced by Goethe's Faust, though Faust, Part One had been published in 1808. Instead, Bernard's libretto draws mainly on Faust plays and poems by Friedrich Maximilian Klinger and Heinrich von Kleist. Spohr's Faust is an important work in the history of German Romantic opera.

== Performance history ==
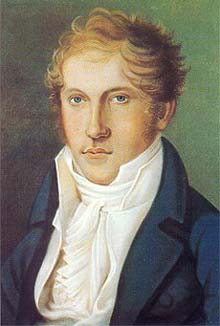
Louis Spohr

Spohr had left his court appointment at Gotha and taken up a post in Vienna at the Theater an der Wien, which had recently been purchased by Count Ferdinánd Pálffy de Erdöd. Spohr composed the opera in less than four months, May to September 1813 but had difficulties with Count Pálffy that interfered with getting it staged in Vienna. Though he took the manuscript score privately to Giacomo Meyerbeer, who played it, with Spohr singing — supplementing his vocal range by whistling — it was not until Carl Maria von Weber took an interest in the score that it received its premiere. Weber conducted the first performance of Faust at the Estates Theatre in Prague on 1 September 1816. Meyerbeer introduced it at Berlin.

In its original form, the opera was a Singspiel in two acts. In 1851, Spohr turned the piece into a grand opera in three acts, replacing the spoken dialogue with recitative. This version (in an Italian translation) received its premiere in London at the Royal Italian Opera, Covent Garden, on 15 July 1852. A performance was given by the University College Opera at the Bloomsbury Theatre in February 1984. In 1993 the Bielefeld Opera also performed this form of Faust in what was claimed to be the first staged production worldwide since 1931. Conducted by Geoffrey Moull and directed by Matthias Oldag, the opera was given eight performances and subsequently recorded for CPO.

== Roles ==
Roles, voive types, premiere cast
| Role | Voice type | Premiere cast, 1 September 1816 Conductor: Carl Maria von Weber |
|---|---|---|
| Faust | baritone | Johann Nepomuk Schelble |
| Mephistopheles | baritone | |
| Count Hugo | tenor | |
| Kunigunde his fiancée | soprano | Therese Grünbaum |
| Röschen a young girl | soprano | |
| Kaylinger a friend of Faust | baritone | |
| Wohlhardt a friend of Faust | tenor | |
| Wagner a friend of Faust | tenor | |
| Moor a friend of Faust | baritone | |
| Franz | tenor | |
| Gulf | bass | |
| Sycorax a witch | soprano | |
| Count Hugo's page | spoken role | |

== Synopsis ==
Faust is torn between his love for the young Röschen and his desire for Kunigunde, the fiancée of Count Hugo. He makes a pact with the devil Mefistofeles which allows him to rescue Kunigunde from the clutches of the evil knight Gulf. Faust obtains a love potion from the witch Sycorax which he gives to Kunigunde during her wedding celebrations. Outraged at the sudden passion his bride shows for Faust, Count Hugo challenges him to a duel. Faust kills Hugo and flees. Meanwhile, Faust's first love, Röschen, drowns herself in despair. Mefistofeles seizes Faust and drags him down to Hell.

== Recordings ==
- Faust (1852 revision) Bielefeld Opera, Soloists, Chorus, Bielefeld Philharmonic Orchestra, conducted by Geoffrey Moull (CPO, 1994).
- Faust – Bo Skovhus, Franz Hawlata, Robert Swensen, Brigitte Wohlfarth, Hillevi Martinpelto, others; Südfunkchor Stuttgart; Rundfunkorchester des SWF Kaiserslautern; Klaus Arp conducting; Capriccio CD label. (1994) OCLC 32555844 This recording is of the original version.
