= String Quartet No. 11 (Spohr) =

String quartet by Louis Spohr

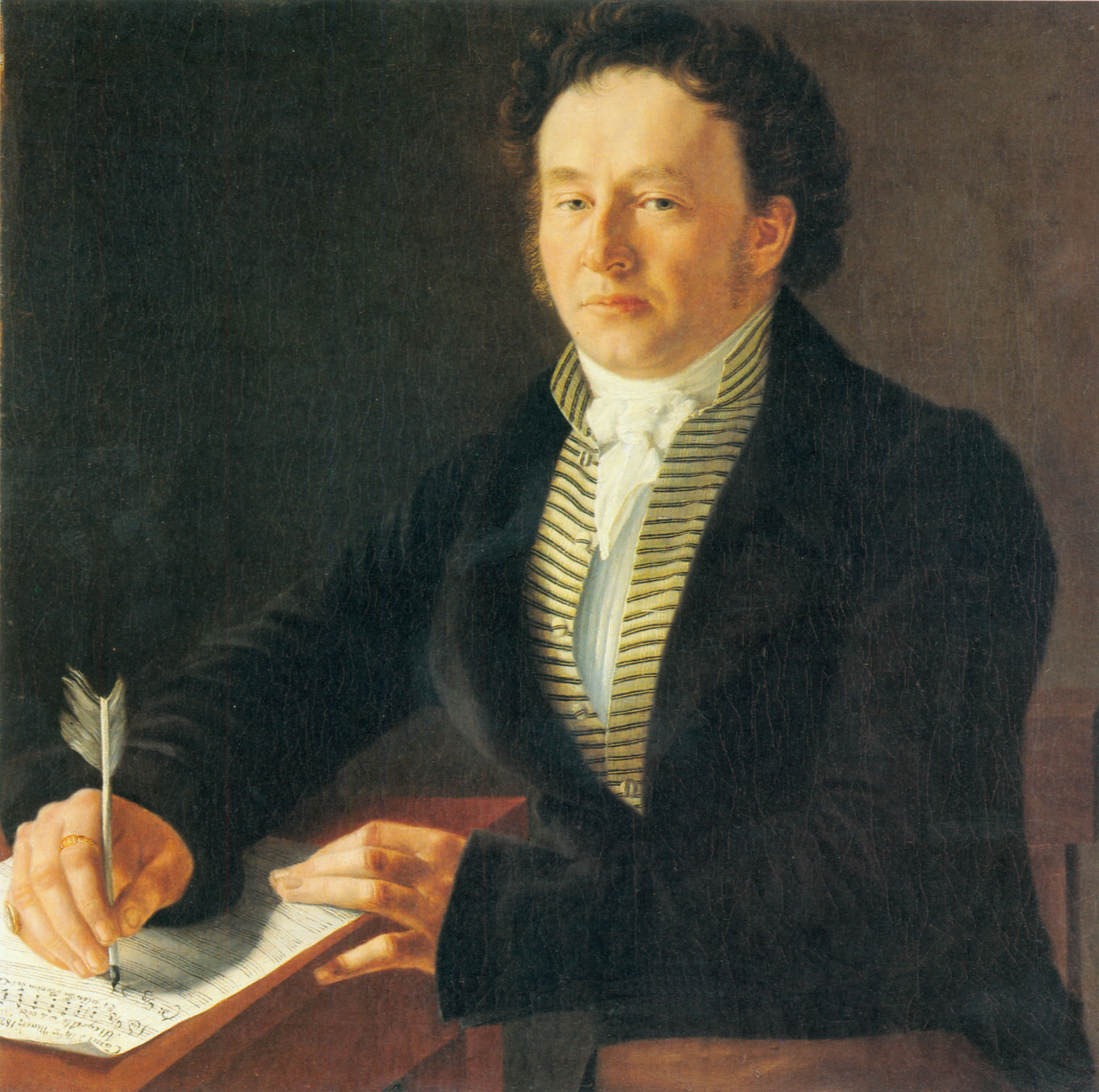
Portrait of Louis Spohr in 1824

Louis Spohr's String Quartet No. 11 ("Quatuor brillant") in E major, Op. 43, was completed in May of 1818. It is one of eight similar works Spohr wrote between 1806 and 1835. Like a concerto, the work is designed to display a soloists skills but in a more intimate setting than the concert hall.

== Movements ==
This quartet is in three movement forms:

1. Allegro
2. Adagio
3. Tempo di minuetto: Un poco vivace
