= String Quartet No. 30 (Spohr) =

String quartet by Louis Spohr

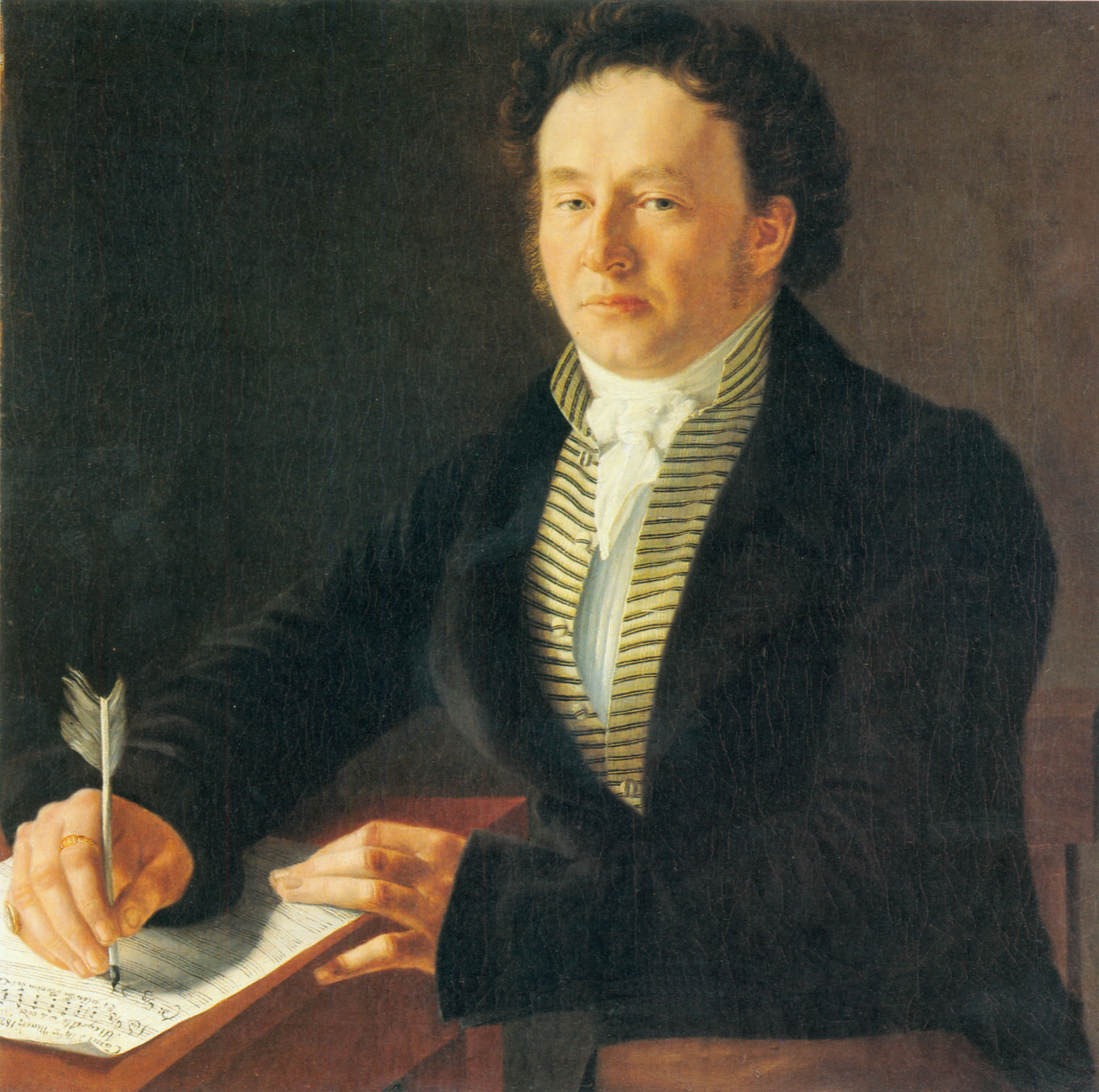
Portrait of Louis Spohr in 1824

Louis Spohr's String Quartet No. 30 ("Quatuor brillant") in A major, Op. 93, was completed in September of 1835. It is one of eight such works Spohr wrote between 1806 and 1835. He would not write another string quartet for ten years.

== Movements ==
This quartet is in three movement form:

1. Andante – Allegro
2. Larghetto
3. Rondo: Allegretto
