= Potpourri No. 4 (Spohr) =

Potpourri No. 4 in B major, Op. 24, by Louis Spohr, was completed in 1808. The work was one of several compositions that Spohr, a noted violinist, wrote to provide a virtuoso encore when performing more serious chamber works such as Beethoven's Opus 18 string quartets. Written for a virtuoso first violin, with accompanying string trio (violin, viola, cello), like many similar works of this period, was based on themes from popular operas, in this case Mozart's Die Entführung aus dem Serail (In Mohrenland gefangen war) and Don Giovanni (Batti, batti).

== Movements ==
The composition is made up of a single multi-tempo movement, marked Adagio con molto espressione – Andante – Grazioso – Allegro vivace – Allegretto, and an average performance should take around 11 minutes.
