= Alfred Walter =

Alfred Walter (May 8, 1929 – March 7, 2004) was a Bohemian-Austrian conductor.

He was born in Southern Bohemia to Austrian parents, and studied at the University of Graz. He was appointed as assistant conductor to the Opera of Ravensburg in 1948. Later, he became the conductor of the Graz Opera, a title that he held until 1965, while serving at Bayreuth as assistant to Hans Knappertsbusch and Karl Böhm. Walter was the principal conductor of the Durban Symphony Orchestra in South Africa from 1966 to 1969. After that, he served fifteen years as General Director of Music in Münster. In Vienna he worked as guest conductor at the State Opera, and in 1980, Walter was awarded the Golden Medal of the International Gustav Mahler Society. In 1986, the Austrian government gave him the title of Professor.

Walter recorded many works of Johann Strauss II and other composers for Naxos Records.
