= Louis Spohr =

German composer, violinist and conductor (1784–1859)

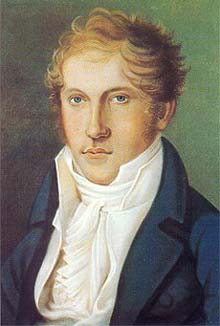
Spohr self-portrait

Louis Spohr ([ˈluːi ˈʃpo:ɐ], 5 April 1784 – 22 October 1859), baptized Ludewig Spohr, later often in the modern German form of the name Ludwig, was a German composer, violinist and conductor.

Highly regarded during his lifetime, Spohr composed ten symphonies, ten operas, eighteen violin concerti, four clarinet concerti, four oratorios, and various works for small ensemble, chamber music, and art songs. Spohr invented the violin chinrest and the orchestral rehearsal mark. His output spans the transition between Classical and Romantic music, but fell into obscurity following his death, when his music was rarely heard. The late twentieth century saw a modest revival of interest in his oeuvre, primarily in Europe, but his reputation has never been restored to that during his lifetime.

== Life ==
Spohr was born in Braunschweig in the duchy of Brunswick-Wolfenbüttel to Karl Heinrich Spohr and Juliane Ernestine Luise Henke on 5 April 1784; then in 1786 the family moved to Seesen. Spohr's first musical encouragement came from his parents: his mother was a gifted singer and pianist, and his father played the flute. A violinist named Dufour gave him his earliest violin teaching. The pupil's first attempts at composition date from the early 1790s. Dufour, recognizing the boy's musical talent, persuaded his parents to send him to Brunswick for further instruction.

Bust of Spohr

The failure of his first concert tour, a badly planned venture to Hamburg in 1799, caused him to ask Duke Karl Wilhelm Ferdinand of Brunswick for financial help. A successful concert at the court impressed the duke so much that he engaged the 15-year-old Spohr as a chamber musician. In 1802, through the good offices of the duke, he became the pupil of Franz Eck and accompanied him on a concert tour which took him as far as Saint Petersburg. Eck, who completely retrained Spohr in violin technique, was a product of the Mannheim school, and Spohr became its most prominent heir. Spohr's first notable compositions, including his Violin Concerto No. 1, date from this time. After his return home, the duke granted him leave to make a concert tour of North Germany. A concert in Leipzig in December 1804 brought the influential music critic Friedrich Rochlitz "to his knees," not only because of Spohr's playing but also because of his compositions. This concert brought the young man overnight fame in the whole German-speaking world.

In 1805, Spohr obtained a position as concertmaster at the court of Gotha, where he stayed until 1812. There he met the 18-year-old harpist and pianist Dorette Scheidler, daughter of one of the court singers. They were married on 2 February 1806, and lived happily until Dorette's death 28 years later. They performed successfully together as a violin and harp duo (Spohr having composed the Sonata in C minor for violin and harp for her), touring in Italy (1816–1817), England (1820) and Paris (1821), but Dorette later abandoned her harpist's career and concentrated on raising their children.

In 1808, Spohr practiced with Beethoven at the latter's home, working on the Piano Trio, Op. 70 No. 1, The Ghost. Spohr wrote that the piano was out of tune and that Beethoven's playing was harsh or careless. In 1812, Spohr conducted a concert in the Predigerkirche of the French-occupied Principality of Erfurt to celebrate Napoleon's 43rd birthday. Spohr later worked as conductor at the Theater an der Wien, Vienna (1813–1815), where he continued to be on friendly terms with Beethoven; subsequently he was opera director at Frankfurt (1817–1819) where he was able to stage his own operas — the first of which, Faust, had been rejected in Vienna. Spohr's longest period of employment, from 1822 until his death, was as the director of music at the recently succeeded William II, Elector of Hesse's court of Kassel, a position offered him on the suggestion of Carl Maria von Weber.

In Kassel on 3 January 1836, he married his second wife, the 29-year-old Marianne Pfeiffer, daughter of the jurist Burkhard Wilhelm Pfeiffer. She survived him by many years, living until 1892.

In 1851 the elector refused to sign the permit for Spohr's two months' leave of absence, to which he was entitled under his contract, and when the musician departed without the permit, a portion of his salary was deducted. In 1857 he was pensioned off, much against his own wish, and in the winter of the same year he broke his arm, an accident which put an end to his violin playing. Nevertheless, he conducted his opera Jessonda at the fiftieth anniversary of the Prague Conservatorium in the following year. In 1859 he died at Kassel on 22 October.

Like Haydn, Mozart, and his own slightly older contemporary Hummel, Spohr was an active Freemason. He was also active as a violin instructor and had about 200 pupils throughout his career – many of them becoming famous musicians. His notable pupils included violinists Henry Blagrove and Henry Holmes. See: List of music students by teacher: R to S#Louis Spohr.

== Works ==
Sechs Deutsche Lieder, Op. 103
1. Sei still, mein Herz

2. Zwiegesang

3. Sehnsucht

4. Wiegenlied

5. Das heimliche Lied

6. Wach auf!
Soprano Montserrat Alavedra is joined by William McColl, clarinet (ca 1820), and Joseph Levine, fortepiano

As a composer, Spohr produced more than 150 works with opus numbers, in addition to nearly 140 works without such numbers. He wrote music in all genres. His nine symphonies (a tenth was completed, but withdrawn: Cf.) show a progress from the classical style of his predecessors to program music: his sixth symphony represents successive styles from "Bach–Handel" to the moderns; his seventh symphony represents the 'sacred and secular in human life' with a double orchestra; and his ninth symphony represents Die Jahreszeiten (The Seasons). (The autograph score of the tenth symphony, which bears the complete work, is held by the Staatsbibliothek Berlin. Furthermore, the same institution holds a complete set of copied parts. Cf. also). Between 1803 and 1844 Spohr wrote more violin concertos than any other composer of the time, eighteen in all, including works left unpublished at his death. Some of them are formally unconventional, such as the one-movement Concerto No. 8, which is in the style of an operatic aria, and which is still periodically revived (Jascha Heifetz championed it), most recently in a 2006 recording by Hilary Hahn. There are two double-violin concertos as well. Better known today, however, are the four clarinet concertos, all written for the virtuoso Johann Simon Hermstedt, which have established a secure place in clarinettists' repertoire.

Among Spohr's chamber music is a series of no fewer than 36 string quartets, as well as four double quartets for two string quartets. He also wrote an assortment of other quartets, duos, trios, quintets and sextets, an octet and a nonet, works for solo violin and for solo harp, and works for violin and harp to be played by him and his wife together.

Though obscure today, Spohr's operas Faust (1816), Zemire und Azor (1819) and Jessonda (1823) remained in the popular repertoire through the 19th century and well into the 20th, when Jessonda was banned by the Nazis because it depicted a European hero in love with an Indian princess. Spohr also wrote 105 songs and duets, many of them collected as Deutsche Lieder (German songs), as well as a mass and other choral works. Most of his operas were little known outside of Germany, but his oratorios, particularly Die letzten Dinge (1825–1826) were greatly admired during the 19th century in England and America. This oratorio was translated by Edward Taylor (1784–1863) and performed as The Last Judgment in 1830 for the first time. During the Victorian era Gilbert and Sullivan mentioned him in act 2 of The Mikado in a song by the title character.

Spohr, with his eighteen violin concertos, won a conspicuous place in the musical literature of the nineteenth century. He endeavored (without any good result) to make the concerto a substantial and superior composition free from the artificial bravura of the time. He achieved a new romantic mode of expression. The weaker sides of Spohr's violin compositions are observed in his somewhat monotonous rhythmic structures; in his rejection of certain piquant bowing styles, and artificial harmonics; and in the deficiency of contrapuntal textures.

Spohr was a noted violinist, and invented the violin chinrest, about 1820. He was also a significant conductor, being one of the first to use a baton and also inventing rehearsal letters, which are placed periodically throughout a piece of sheet music so that a conductor may save time by asking the orchestra or singers to start playing "from letter C", for example.

In addition to musical works, Spohr is remembered particularly for his Violinschule (The Violin School), a treatise on violin playing which codified many of the latest advances in violin technique, such as the use of spiccato. It became a standard work of instruction. In addition, he wrote an entertaining and informative autobiography, published posthumously in 1860. A museum is devoted to his memory in Kassel.

According to Rey M. Longyear, Spohr's best works were hailed by many of his contemporaries as quintessentially Romantic and inherited by Mendelssohn.

== Selected recordings ==
Opera

- Faust (WoO 51) Hillevi Martinpelto, Franz Hawlata and Bo Skovhus. Klaus Arp conducting the SWR Radio Orchestra, Kaiserslautern. Label: Capriccio, 1995.
- Faust (WoO 51a – recitative version of 1852) A live recording of Bielefeld Opera from June 17/18, 1993. Geoffrey Moull conducting the Bielefelder Philharmonie, Chorus of the Bielefeld opera house. Label: CPO Records, 1994.
- Zemire und Azor (WoO 52) "The Beauty and the Beast" – A production with singers of the Manhattan School of Music, New York, Christopher Larkin conducting. English spoken dialogues. Label: Albany Records, 2005.
- Zemire und Azor (WoO 52) Anton Kolar conducting the Max Bruch Philharmonie, a production of the Theater Nordhausen. Label: Ds – Pool Music und Media, 2003.
- Jessonda (WoO 53) Gerd Albrecht conducting the Hamburg State Philharmonic Orchestra, with Dietrich Fischer-Dieskau, Júlia Várady, Renate Behle, Kurt Moll a.o. The Chorus of the Hamburgische Staatsoper. Label: Orfeo, 1994.
- Der Berggeist (WoO 54) Wykonawca: Camerata Silesia, Polska Orkiestra Radiowa, Susanne Bernhard, Agnieszka Piass, Dan Karlstrom, Szabolcs Brickner. Conductor: Łukasz Borowicz. Warsaw, April 8, 2009.
- Der Alchymist (WoO 57) Bernd Weikl, Moran Abouloff, Jörg Dürmüller, Jan Zinkler, Susanna Pütters, Staatsorchester Braunschweig, Christian Fröhlich. Label: Oehms, 2009. The libretto is based on Washington Irving's sketch "The Student of Salamanca" from Bracebridge Hall, 1822.

Note: WoO = work without opus number (see also: Folker Göthel "Thematisch-Bibliographisches Verzeichnis der Werke von Louis Spohr". Tutzing, 1981).
