= List of compositions by Arthur Bliss =

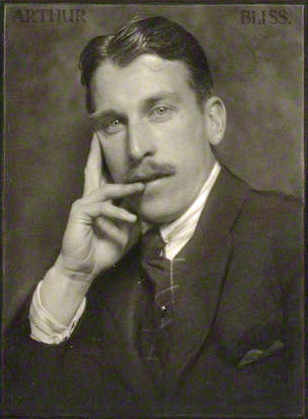
Arthur Bliss c. 1922 (photograph by Herbert Lambert)

This is a list of compositions by Arthur Bliss.

Bliss's works have been catalogued by Lewis Foreman, and "F" numbers are now commonly used to identify his music.

== Stage ==
=== Operas ===
- F. 97, The Olympians (1948)
- F. 96, The Beggar's Opera (1952)
- F. 98, Tobias and the Angel (1960)

=== Ballets ===
- F. 8, Rout (a ballet in one scene) (1920?)
- F. 119, Melee Fantasque (1921)
- F. 7, Narcissus and Echo (1931; based on Rhapsody)
- F. 2, Checkmate (1937)
- F. 6, Miracle in the Gorbals (1944)
- F. 1, Adam Zero (1946)
- F. 5, The Lady of Shallot (1958)
- F. 3, Diversions (based on Music for Strings) (1961)
- F. 4, Frontier (based on music from Quintet for Oboe and String Quartet) (1969?)
- F. 9, A Royal Offering (based on A Colour Symphony) (1977)

=== Incidental music ===
- F. 85, As You Like It (1919)
- F. 86, King Solomon (1924)
- F. 87, Summer Day's Dream - violin and oboe (1949)

== Orchestral ==
- F. 119, Melee Fantasque (revision) (1921/1937/1965)
- F. 133, Two Studies (1920)
- F. 106, A Colour Symphony (1921/1932)
- F. 127, Pyonepsion (last movement of A Colour Symphony) (1922)
- F. 102, Bliss: One Step (1923)
- F. 134, Twone, the house of Felicity (1923)
- F. 124, Polonaise (1925)
- F. 116, Hymn to Apollo (1926/1965)
- F. 117, Introduction and Allegro (1926/1937)
- F. 123, Music for Strings (1935)
- F. 94, March, The Phoenix - homage to France (1944)
- F. 120, Memorial Concert (1946)
- F. 120, Theme and Cadenza (from "Memorial Concert", radio play by Trudy Bliss) (1949)
- F. 126, Processional (1953)
- F. 101, A Birthday Greeting for Her Majesty, (1955)
- F. 118, Meditation on a Theme by John Blow (1955)
- F. 114, Edinburgh Overture (1956)
- F. 113, Discourse for Orchestra (1957/1965)
- F. 104, Ceremonial Prelude (1965)
- F. 93, March in homage of a great man (1965)
- F. 122, Metamorphic Variations (1972)
- F. 132, Two Contrasts for String Orchestra (1972)

== Concertante ==
- F. 109, Concerto for Piano, Strings, Tenor and Percussion (1920/1923)
- F. 110, Concerto for Two Pianos and Orchestra (1924)
- F. 91 Viola Concerto (1933/2024), the Viola Sonata orchestrated by Philip Wilby
- F. 108, Concerto for Piano in B♭ major (1938; premiered by Solomon)
- F. 111, Violin Concerto (1953; premiered by Alfredo Campoli in 1955)
- F. 107, Cello Concerto (1970; premiered by Mstislav Rostropovich)

== Vocal/choral orchestral ==
- F. 33, Pastoral 'Lie strewn the white flocks' (1928)
- F. 32, Morning Heroes (1930)
- F. 34, Songs of Welcome (1954)
- F. 28, Beatitudes, The (1961)
- F. 31, Mary of Magdala (1962)
- F. 30, Golden Cantata (1963)
- F. 29, God save the Queen (1969)
- F. 36, World is charged with the Grandeur of God, The (1969)
- F. 35, Two Ballads (1971)

== Chamber music ==
- -, Trio for piano, clarinet and cello (1909)
- -, Quartet for piano, clarinet, cello and timpani (1910??)
- F. 23, String Quartet in A major (1913)
- F. 18, Piano Quartet in A minor (1915)
- F. 17, Fugue for String Quartet (1916) (Note: lost)
- F. 22, Piano Quintet (1919) (Note: lost)
- F. 16, Conversations (1920)
- F. 24, String Quartet (1923) (Note: fragmentary work)
- F. 190, Allegro (from incomplete string quartet) (1927)
- F. 21, Quintet for oboe and strings (1927)
- F. 20, Quintet for Clarinet and String Quartet (1932)
- F. 91, Sonata for Viola and Piano (1933)
- F. 25, String Quartet No.1 B♭ major (1941)
- F. 26, String Quartet No.2 (1950)
- F. 27, Toast to the Royal Household (1961)
- F. 19, Play a penta (1971)
- -, Prelude for Brass, Percussion, Piccolo and Double Bassoon (1974?) (also known as Fanfare for Lancaster)

== Instrumental ==
=== Piano ===
- F. 142, May Zeeh (1910)
- F. 147, Suite (1912)
- F. 139, Intermezzo (1912)
- F. 152, Valse Fantastiques (1913)
- F. 155, Rout (two piano arrangement) (1920?)
- F. 138, Bliss: One Step (1923)
- F. 141, Masks (1924)
- F. 148, Suite (1925)
- F. 149, Toccata (1925)
- F. 151, Two Interludes (1925)
- F. 144, Rout Trot, The (1927)
- F. 146, Study (1927)
- F. 140, Karen's Piece (1940/1941)
- F. 145, Piano Sonata (1952) (written for Noel Mewton-Wood, who had played the Piano Concerto to Bliss's great satisfaction; first recording 1960 by Marguerite Wolf)
- F. 143, Miniature Scherzo (1969)
- F. 154, Fun and Games (three hands/two pianos, adapted from the ballet Adam Zero) (1970)
- F. 150, Triptych (1970)
- F. 153, Wedding Suite, A (1974)

=== Organ ===
- F. 137, Praeludium (1971)

=== Other ===
- F. 89, Intermezzo for Viola and Piano (1914?)
- F. 192, Violin Sonata (incomplete) (1914)
- F. 92, Two Pieces for Clarinet (1916)
- F. 89a, Andante Tranquillo e Legato (1926??)
- F. 91, Viola Sonata (1933), premiered by Lionel Tertis and Solomon
- F. 88, Enid’s Blast (1968)
- F. 90, Music for a Prince (1970)

== Vocal ==
=== Voice and ensemble ===
- F. 160, Madam Noy (1918)
- F. 161, Rhapsody (1919)
- F. 162, Rout (1920)
- F. 165, Two Nursery Rhymes for Voice, Clarinet in A (or Viola), and Piano (1920)
- F. 164, The Tempest, (1921)
- F. 166, Women of Yu’eh (1923)
- F. 158, Four Songs (1927)
- F. 163, Serenade for Baritone and Orchestra (1929)
- F. 163, Two Love Songs (from the Serenade) (1929)
- F. 157, The Enchantress, (1951)
- F. 156, Elegiac Sonnet (1954)
- F. 159, A Knot of Riddles, (1963)
- F. 35, Two Ballads (1971)
- F. 158, Four Songs (1973)

=== Voice and piano ===
- F. 181, Tis time I think by Wenlock Town (1914)
- F. 173, The Hammers, (1915)
- F. 182, The Tramps, (1916)
- F. 188a, La Serva Padrona (Pergolesi) (1919)
- F. 179, Three Romantic Songs (1921)
- F. 180, Three Songs (1923/1972)
- F. 170, Ballad of the Four Seasons, The (1923)
- F. 178, Three Jolly Gentlemen (1923)
- F. 185, When I was one and twenty (1923)
- F. 172, Fallow deer at the lonely house, The (1924)
- F. 168, At the Window (1925)
- F. 174, Rich or Poor (1925)
- F. 171, Child's prayer, A (1926)
- F. 177, Simples (1932)
- F. 176, Seven American Poems (1940)
- F. 184, Two American Poems (1940)
- F. 169, Auvergnat (1943)
- F. 191, Pack clouds away (incomplete) (1960s)
- F. 193, Song of a man who has come through (incomplete) (1960s)
- F. 167, Angels of the Mind (1969)
- F. 175, Sailing or Flying (1970)
- F. 183, Tulips (1970)

=== Choral ===
- -, When wilt thou save thy people? (1943??)
- F. 37, Aubade for Coronation Morning (1953)
- F. 51, Seek the Lord (1956)
- F. 38, Birthday songs for a Royal child (1959)
- F. 54, Stand up and bless the Lord (1960)
- F. 40, Cradle Song of a newborn child (1963)
- F. 45, O give thanks unto the Lord (1965)
- F. 41, He is the Way (1967)
- F. 50, River Music (1967)
- F. 55, Sweet Day, so cool (1967)
- F. 56, Three Songs for Girls and Boys (1967)
- F. 42, Lord, who shall abide in thy tabernacle? (1968)
- F. 46, One, two, buckle my shoe (1968)
- F. 48, Prayer to the infant Jesus, A (1968)
- F. 39, Christ is Alive! Let Christians sing (1970)
- F. 44, Ode for Sir William Walton (1972)
- F. 47, Prayer of St Francis of Assisi (1972)
- F. 49, Put thou thy trust in the Lord (1972)
- F. 43, Mar Portugues (1973)
- F. 52, Shield of Faith (1974)
- F. 53, Sing, Mortals (1974)

=== Hymns ===
- -, Pen Selwood – Hymn Tune (1967?)
- -, Santa Barbara – Hymn Tune (1967??)
- -, Mortlake – Hymn Tune (1971?)

== Brass/military band ==
- F. 113, Kenilworth (1936)
- F. 12, First Guards (1956)
- F. 11, Call to Adventure (1962)
- F. 10, Belmont Variations, The (1963)
- F. 14, Linburn Air (1965)
- F. 15, Salute to Lehigh University (1968)

== Fanfares ==
- F. 62, Fanfare for a Political Address (1921)
- F. 63, Fanfare for Heroes (1930)
- F. 59, Dominion Greetings (1935)
- F. 83, Three Jubilant and Three Solemn Fanfares (1935/1943)
- F. 61, Fanfare for a Dignified Occasion (1938)
- F. 57, Birthday Fanfare for Henry Wood (1944)
- F. 75, Peace Fanfare for Children (1944)
- F. 79, Salute to Painting, A (1953)
- F. 80, Salute to the RAF, A (1956)
- F. 82, Service of the Order of the Bath (1956)
- F. 68, Fanfare preceding the National Anthem (1960)
- F. 74, Let the People Sing - Two Fanfares (1960)
- F. 78, Royal Fanfares and Interludes (1960)
- F. 81, Salute to the Royal Society, a (1960)
- F. 71, Greetings to a City (1961)
- F. 84, Wedding of Princess Margaret, Music for (1961?)
- F. 70, Gala Fanfare (1962)
- F. 72, High Sheriff's Fanfare (1963)
- F. 67, Fanfare, Homage to Shakespeare (1964)
- F. 64, Fanfare for the Commonwealth Arts Festival (1965)
- F. 77, Right of the Line, The (1965/1982 poth.)
- F. 69, Fanfare: Prelude for Orchestra ‘Macclesfield’ (1966)
- F. 65, Fanfare for the Lord Mayor of London (1967)
- F. 76, Prince of Wales Investiture Music (1969)
- F. 158, Birthday Greetings to the Croydon Symphony Orchestra (1971)
- F. 60, Fanfare for a Coming of Age (1973)
- F. 66, Fanfare for the National Fund for Crippling Diseases (1973)
- F. 84, Wedding of Princess Anne, Music for (1973)
- F. 73, Lancaster-prelude (1974)

== Orchestral arrangements ==
- F. 188, Fire Dance (arr. of work by Sinding)
- F. 189, Set of act Tunes and Dances (Purcell) (1921)
- F. 186, Das alte jahr vergangen is (Bach) (1932)

== Arrangements for brass/military band ==
- F. 187, Three Bach Chorales from St John Passion (1960)

== Music for media ==
=== Film music ===
- F. 131, Things to Come (1934)
- F. 112, Conquest of the Air (1936)
- F. 103, Caesar and Cleopatra (1945) (not used; replaced by a new score by Georges Auric)
- F. 121, Men of Two Worlds (1945)
- F. 125, Présence au combat (1945)
- F. 105, Christopher Columbus (1949)
- F. 135, War in the Air (1954)
- F. 95, Welcome the Queen (1954)
- F. 129, Seven Waves Away (1956)

=== Music for radio ===
- F. 136, Your question answered (1944)
- F. 115, Heritage of Britain (1950)

=== Music for television ===
- F. 99, ABC Television Signature and Interval Music (1956)
- F. 100, An Age of Kings (1960)
- F. 128, Royal Palace Music for The Royal Palaces of Britain (1966)
- F. 130, Spirit of the Age (1975)

== Lost ==
- -, Elizabethan Suite (??)
- -, March and Valse des Fleurs (arr. Tchaikovsky) (1910??)
- -, Valses Melancoliques, Deuxième Preludes; Valse-Phantasie (1913??)
- -, The Festival of Flora (arr. of Henry Purcell) (1927??)
- -, Theme from Processional Interlude (1969)
