= Op. 4 =

In music, Op. 4 stands for Opus number 4. Compositions that are assigned this number include:

- Beethoven – String Quintet, Op. 4
- Berg – Altenberg Lieder
- Bliss – String Quartet in A major
- Brahms – Scherzo
- Britten – Simple Symphony
- Chopin – Piano Sonata No. 1
- David – Trombone Concertino
- Dommayer – Gunstwerber
- Dvořák – Symphony No. 2
- Elgar – Idylle
- G. English – Symphony No. 1
- Handel – Organ concertos, Op. 4
- Madetoja – Elegia, for strings (1910)
- Mielck – Symphony in F minor (1897, revised 1898)
- Mendelssohn – Violin Sonata in F minor
- Reger – Sechs Lieder, Op. 4
- Schoenberg – Verklärte Nacht
- Schumann – Intermezzi
- Schütz – Cantiones sacrae
- Sibelius – String Quartet in B-flat major (1890)
- Strauss – Kettenbrücke-Walzer
- Stravinsky – Feu d'artifice
- Vivaldi – La stravaganza
- Wieniawski – Polonaise de Concert, Op. 4
- Zandonai – Francesca da Rimini
