= George English =

George English may refer to:

- George Bethune English (1787–1828), American adventurer, diplomat, soldier, and convert to Islam
- George English (politician), Member of the Alabama House of Representatives, 1878
- George English (tenor) (1882–1972), Australian tenor soloist, conductor and composer
  - George Selwyn English (1912–1980), Australian composer, son of the latter
- George W. English (1866–1941), United States federal judge
