= Oleg Troyanovsky (composer) =

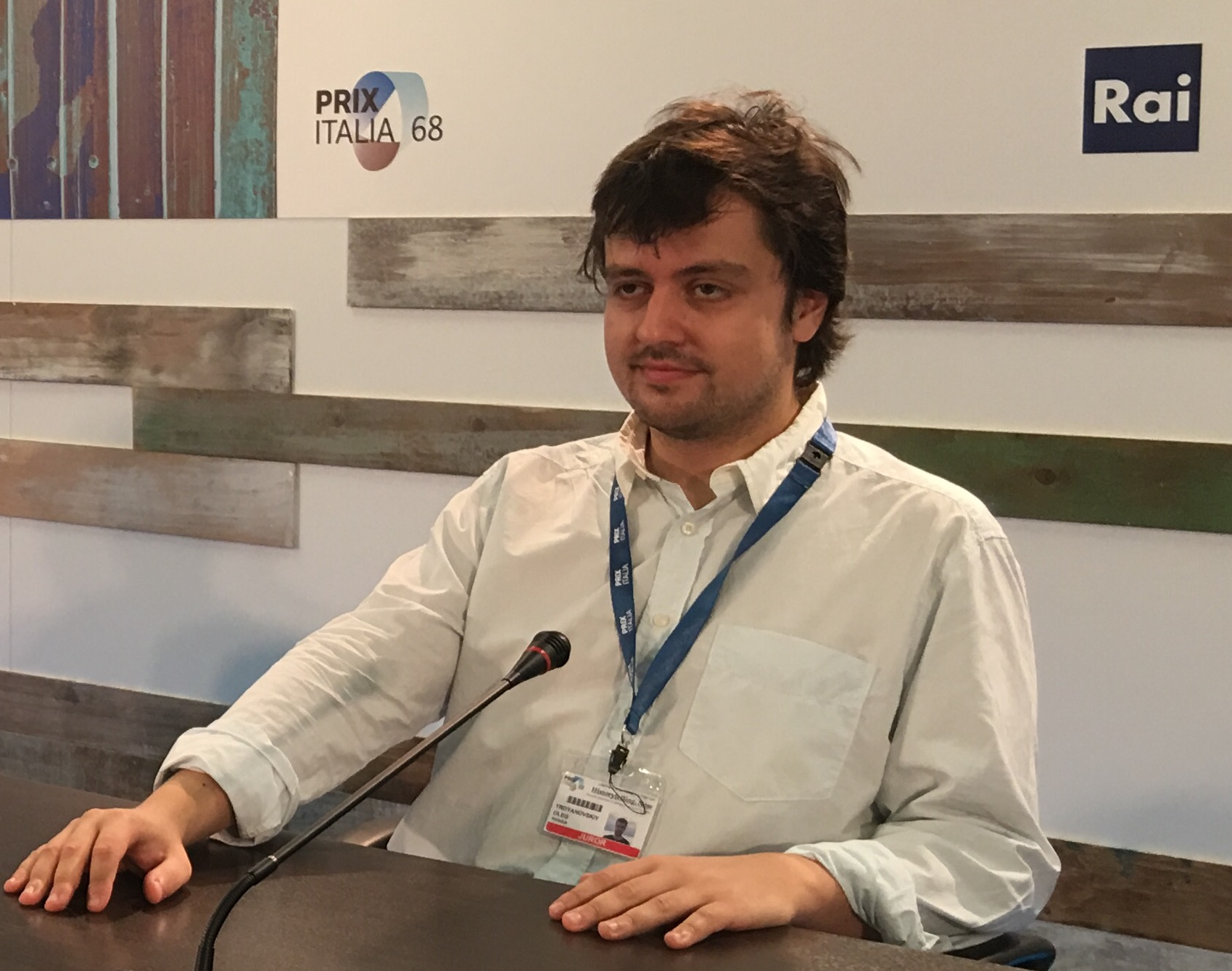

Background information
- Born: 1980 (age 45–46)
- Education: Moscow Conservatory
- Genres: Contemporary classical music, Electroacoustic music, Interactive music, Film score
- Occupations: Composer, media artist
- Label: Claves Records

Oleg Troyanovsky (born 1980) is a composer and media artist based in New York City. His work has included instrumental music, sound installations, radio compositions, and film scores. He has used numerical data, codes and other non-musical systems as musical material.

His radio work Encrypted in Music, won the Prix Italia – Radio Music award in 2015, while Radio Symphony: Music Observatory received a Special Commendation award at Prix Europa the same year. His orchestral composition Unknown Story was recorded by the London Symphony Orchestra for a 2026 album released by Claves Records.

== Education ==
Troyanovsky spent his early childhood in Geneva, Switzerland. He graduated from the Moscow Conservatory in 2004, where his composition teachers included Sergei Zagny.

== Career ==
=== Radio works ===
Troyanovsky created Encrypted in Music for Radio Russia in 2015 as its author, composer, director and sound designer. The work explores how messages, mathematical formulas and visual images can be encoded in music. It included contributions from composers Sofia Gubaidulina, Tom Johnson and Sergei Zagny, as well as musicologists Anatoly Milka and Ulrich Siegele. A feature by Sergey Sych in Argumenty Nedeli examined the work and included Troyanovsky's comments on its use of musical cryptography. In 2015, Encrypted in Music won the Prix Italia award for best programme about any kind of music attracting a broader audience.

Radio Symphony: Music Observatory is a hybrid radio composition structured as a discussion among five fictional composers who present and debate works attributed to them. The participants are portrayed by actors, and the programme is ultimately revealed as a single five-part symphony with spoken voices by Troyanovsky. It received a Special Commendation award in the Radio Music category at Prix Europa in 2015.

In 2016, Troyanovsky served on the Radio Music jury of the Prix Italia.

=== Data-based compositions and installations ===
In 2019, Troyanovsky composed Periodic Table for a virtual reconstruction of Dmitri Mendeleev's study created by Moscow State University in connection with the International Year of the Periodic Table. The composition uses the atomic masses of chemical elements as musical material, mapping letters and numerical information in notes and instrumental parts. Troyanovsky and the method behind the work were the subject of a report on the Russia-K news programme Novosti kultury.

For ROSIZO's 2019 exhibition History of One House, Troyanovsky created an installation derived from the Botkin family coat of arms, mapping its circles and dots onto a musical staff.

In 2023, his composition Paysage intérieur accompanied the exhibition Tel endroit, tel moment at the Espace Saint-Pierre des Minimes and Galerie de l'Est in Compiègne, France. The work used the composer's biodata as structural material.

In 2025, his interactive sound installation Tap Code Songs was presented at Amherst College as part of the exhibition Pictures from the "Dead House": Leonid Lamm's Prison Dialogue with Fyodor Dostoevsky. The installation uses a prison tap code to translate prisoners' messages into musical material with which visitors can interact.

=== Concert music ===
Troyanovsky's orchestral composition Unknown Story is included on the 2026 album Hope: 12 Prayers for Cello & Orchestra. It was recorded at Abbey Road Studios by cellist Andreas Graf with the London Symphony Orchestra conducted by Ben Palmer and released by Claves Records. The work was subsequently broadcast by Swiss public broadcaster SRF in a programme devoted to the album.

=== Film and television ===
Troyanovsky has composed music for films and television productions, including Boris Yukhananov's The Mad Angel Pinocchio (2022), the KION series First Number (2024) and Polden (2026), and Stasia Tolstaya's Family Happiness (2025).

In 2020, Troyanovsky was selected as one of six finalists from more than 11,000 entries in the Westworld Scoring Competition organized by Spitfire Audio and HBO. The jury included J. J. Abrams, Jonathan Nolan, Ramin Djawadi and Lisa Joy.
