= Trbojević =

Trbojević is a Serbian name, which may refer to:

- Ben Trbojevic (born 2001), Australian rugby league player
- Dušan Trbojević (1925–2011), Serbian pianist, composer, musical writer and university professor
- Jake Trbojevic (born 1994), Australian rugby league player
- Jovanka Trbojević (1963–2017), Finnish composer
- Petar Trbojević (born 1973), Serbian water polo player
- Tom Trbojevic (born 1996), Australian rugby league player
