= George English (politician) =

American politician

For people with similar names see George English (disambiguation)

George English was a state legislator in Alabama. He was elected in 1878 to represent Wilcox County, Alabama after the Reconstruction era unraveled and Democrats reasserted control, disenfranchising African Americans. English was one of the last African Americans to serve in the Alabama House of Representatives. The Farmer's Magazine and Kentucky Live-stock Monthly disparaged him and the other last remaining African American member in the House in a description printed in 1877.

English had accused fellow representative Hugh A. Carson of stealing money from him, but the issue was settled by their attorneys before legal action was taken.
