= Symphony No. 2 (G. English) =

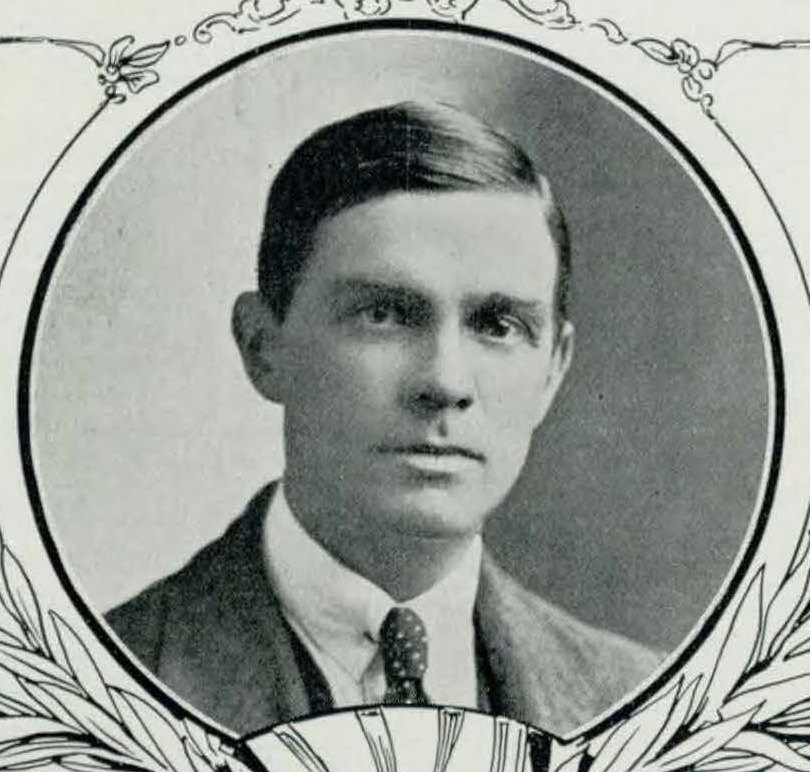
George English c.1920

Symphony No. 2 in D minor, Op. 5 was composed by George English in 1933 (from 1 February to 2 November). It is a larger work than his First, but more conventional.

== History ==
Like English's Symphony No. 1, this symphony was performed by the Melbourne Symphony Orchestra under the composer's direction during the Melbourne Centenary Celebrations (1934). On 28 October 1934 another performance of the Second followed, again with the composer conducting. An advertisement in The Argus described it as The Australian Symphony. On 30 June 1935 the First was heard again, performed by the City of Sydney Orchestra under the composer. The same concert included Andante con espressione from the Second. Both works had favorable reviews.

The full score of the symphony is at the National Library of Australia. It consists of 124 pages and bears the dates of compositions.

== Scoring ==
The symphony is scored for double woodwind (second flute being interchangeable with piccolo), cor anglais, 4 horns, 3 trumpets, 3 trombones, tuba, timpani and strings.

== Structure ==
The symphony consists of four movements.

1. Adagio moderato con molto espressione (D minor)
2. Allegro vivace (G major)
3. Andante con espressione (E major)
4. Con brio e appassionato (C minor, ends in D major)

== Analysis ==
English's second symphony is a darker and more turbulent work than the first. Its outer movements are marked by heavy scoring, while their texture is like that of Robert Schumann or Johannes Brahms. Harmonic diversities of the first symphony are largely missing from the second, and regular sonata outlines are much more evident in it.
