= A Colour Symphony =

Musical work composed by Arthur Bliss

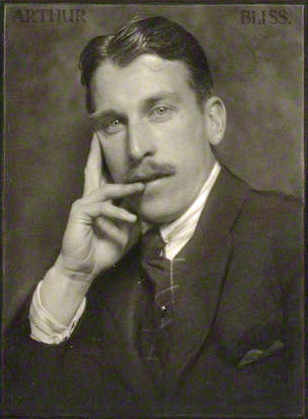
Arthur Bliss c. 1922 (photograph by Herbert Lambert)

A Colour Symphony, Op. 24, F. 106, was written by Arthur Bliss in 1921–22. It was his first major work for orchestra, and is today one of his best-known compositions.

== Orchestration ==
The symphony is scored for three flutes (one doubling on piccolo), two oboes, cor anglais, two clarinets, bass clarinet, two bassoons, double bassoon, four horns, three trumpets, three trombones, tuba, two tympanists, cymbals, two harps, and strings.

== History ==
A Colour Symphony was written to be performed at the Three Choirs Festival, held in 1922 in Gloucester, at the invitation of Sir Edward Elgar, who also invited Herbert Howells and Eugene Goossens to write a piece each. Howells wrote Sine Nomine for wordless chorus, which was not given its second performance until his centenary year 70 years later, in 1992. Goossens wrote a piece called Silence for chorus and orchestra. Elgar's own contribution was his orchestration of Johann Sebastian Bach's Fantasia and Fugue in C minor.

Bliss decided to write a symphony, but was at first undecided what the theme or character of the work would be. He could not get started for some weeks. One day, by chance, he came across a book on heraldry in which he read of the symbolic meanings attached to certain colours; this gave him the notion of writing a work about colours. He attempted to give each movement a character corresponding to these meanings, but without attempting to depict the colours themselves. Although Bliss dedicated the symphony to the conductor Adrian Boult, it appears that there is no existing recording of the symphony by Boult himself.

The first performance, with the London Symphony Orchestra, in Gloucester Cathedral on 7 September 1922, was conducted by the composer. It was not well received at first, due to poor preparation. The work uses a large orchestra, but the platform was so taken up with the chorus required for other works also being performed, that several instruments had to be omitted. Elgar attended, but found it "disconcertingly modern". It nevertheless entered the repertoire and has been recorded various times, although it is now an infrequent visitor to concert platforms.

== Analysis ==
The four movements are:

I	Purple	Andante maestoso	slow and majestic in pace and ceremonial in character
I	The colour of Amethysts, Pageantry, Royalty and Death	Andante maestoso	slow and majestic in pace and ceremonial in character
II	Red	Allegro vivace	a glittering, spiky and percussive scherzo, reminiscent of Stravinsky.
II	The colour of Rubies, Wine, Revelry, Furnaces, Courage and Magic	Allegro vivace	a glittering, spiky and percussive scherzo, reminiscent of Stravinsky.
III	Blue	Gently flowing	slow, with chords used to depict the lapping of water against a moored boat or a pier
III	The colour of Sapphires, Deep Water, Skies, Loyalty and Melancholy	Gently flowing	slow, with chords used to depict the lapping of water against a moored boat or a pier
IV	Green	Moderato	a double fugue (which has been described as "Schoenbergian") on violas, strings, clarinets and woodwinds, leading to a triumphant climax
IV	The colour of Emeralds, Hope, Youth, Joy, Spring and Victory	Moderato	a double fugue (which has been described as "Schoenbergian") on violas, strings, clarinets and woodwinds, leading to a triumphant climax

A theme from towards the end of the Red movement was used as the signature tune of the televised "Royal Institution Christmas Lectures".

== Revision ==
In 1932, Bliss revised the codas of the first two movements. He conducted the revised work himself in a recording with the London Symphony Orchestra in 1955.

The last movement, "Green", was separately published as Pyonepsion.

== Other uses ==
In 1977, a ballet called Royal Offering was created, with music based on A Colour Symphony.

A short extract from the 'Red' movement was used as the opening music to BBC TV coverage of The Proms until 2011.

The British artist Kevin Laycock created a visual piece called Four Movements in Colour, in which he attempted to portray, in colour, the sounds created by Arthur Bliss. In 2004, Laycock created a series of paintings called Tectonics as a direct response to Bliss's A Colour Symphony using parallel compositional structures.

== Select discography ==
- Arthur Bliss conducting the London Symphony Orchestra, Decca "Ace of Clubs" ACL 239, 1964, Mono.
- Charles Groves conducting the Royal Philharmonic Orchestra, EMI ASD 3416, 1977, Stereo.
- Vernon Handley conducting the Ulster Orchestra, Chandos Records CHAN 8503, 1987, Digital Stereo.
- Barry Wordsworth conducting the BBC Welsh Symphony Orchestra, Nimbus Records NI 5294, 1991, Digital Stereo.
- David Lloyd-Jones conducting the English Northern Philharmonia, Naxos 8.553460, 1996, Digital Stereo.

== Sources ==
- Arthur Bliss, liner notes to the recording by Anthony Collins and the London Symphony Orchestra
