= Prix Italia =

International award for radio, TV and digital

The Prix Italia is an international award for radio, television, and digital productions. It was established in 1948 by RAI – Radiotelevisione Italiana (in 1948, RAI had the denomination RAI – Radio Audizioni Italiane) in Capri and is honoured with the High Patronage of the President of the Italian Republic.

== History ==
The Prix Italia was established in Capri in 1948. Originally dedicated only to radio works, starting from 1957 it also included television works, and from 1998, the competition has also awarded multimedia projects created on web digital platforms. Over the years it has been hosted in many of the most famous Italian cities of art.

The idea of an international radio award was proposed in 1948 by the director general of Rai, Salvino Sernesi, the director of programmes Giulio Razzi and the director of the drama and revue sector, the playwright Sergio Pugliese. On 13 September of the same year in Capri, the delegations of fourteen radio organisations representing Austria, the Vatican State, Egypt, France, Great Britain, Italy, the Principality of Monaco, The Netherlands, Poland, Portugal, Sweden, Switzerland, Czechoslovakia and Trieste (which was then a free territory). On that same occasion, the regulations were drawn up and the international prize was officially established.

== Organisation ==
The Prix Italia comprises over 100 public and private broadcasting organizations from 57 countries. Delegates from the member broadcaster determine the organization's editorial direction and elect its president.

RAI is in charge and responsible for the organisation of the event, and the General Secretariat has its headquarters in Rome. Prix Italia is held in an Italian city of art and culture annually every September/October for a week, in collaboration with local authorities. The event is a gathering and professional debate about the quality of the programmes in competition.

The public participates in concerts, films, shows, previews, round tables, "all night out", master classes, radio and web events. Due to the "on demand" workstations, anyone can listen to and watch worldwide programmes in competition.

== Categories of award ==
At first, there was just one award, simply named Prix Italia. In 1949 and 1950 the prize was awarded to a single broadcast: an RDF programme, Frédéric Général, and a RAI production, Ifigenia. In 1951 and 1952, the prize was awarded to two productions in each year (Une larme du diable (RTF) and The Face of Violence (BBC) in 1951, and Le joueur du flûte (RTF) and Lord Inferno (RAI) in 1952). In 1953, the awards were expanded. The Prix Italia was awarded in two categories, for music and drama programmes, and a new prize, sponsored by the Italian Press Association, was awarded for radio documentaries or news programmes. In addition RAI sponsored prizes for music and drama productions. All the prizes are commonly referred to as the Prix Italia. In subsequent years, the categories of award have expanded. The 2025 prize categories are indicated in the following table.

Prix Italia 2025 awards
Section	Award categories		
Radio and Podcast	Music	Drama	Documentary and reportage
TV	Performing Arts	Drama	Documentary
Digital	Factual	Innovation	Multimedia

In addition, there are some special awards. The Global South Award, "dedicated to broadcasters and productions from countries of the so-called Global South" is new in 2025. The YLab Award has been in place since 2017: it is conferred by university students based in the city hosting the Prix Italia each year. A Special Prize in Honour of the President of the Italian Republic is awarded to a work of particular cultural and artistic quality in any medium. The Signis Special Prize is awarded by Signis (the World Catholic Association for Communication) to "television programmes that best reflect the social and human values of the Association."

== Festival editions ==
2025 - Naples (20 ‒ 24 October) "Get Real"
2024 - Torino (1 - 4 October) "Loud and Clear"
2023 - Bari (1 - 6 October) "Engage Me"
2022 - Bari (3 - 8 October) "Sustainable Me"
2021 - Milan - "Rebuilding Culture and Entertainment. Media’s Role for a New Start"
2020 - Rome - “Public Service and the Virtual Newsroom: Back to the Future?”
2019 - Rome - "Celebrating Cultural Diversity in a Global Media World"
2018 - Capri - "The Memory of the Future"
2017 - Milan - "Back to Facts"
2016 - Lampedusa - "Historytelling, now"
2015 - Turin - "The Power of Storytelling"
2014 - Turin - "The Innovation Laboratory"
2013 - Turin - "The Tree of Ideas"
2012 - Turin - "The World in the Mirror"
2011 - Turin
2010 - Turin
2009 - Turin
2008 - Cagliari
2007 - Verona
2006 - Venice
2005 - Milan
2004 - Catania - Taormina
2003 - Catania - Siracusa
2002 - Palermo - Agrigento
2001 - Bologna - Reggio Emilia
2000 - Bologna - Rimini
1999 - Florence - Siena
1998 - Assisi
1997 - Ravenna
1996 - Naples
1995 - Bologna
1994 - Turin
1993 - Rome
1992 - Parma
1991 - Urbino - Pesaro
1990 - Palermo
1989 - Perugia
1988 - Capri
1987 - Vicenza
1986 - Lucca
1985 - Cagliari
1984 - Trieste
1983 - Capri
1982 - Venice
1981 - Siena
1980 - Riva del Garda
1979 - Lecce
1978 - Milan
1977 - Venice
1976 - Bologna
1975 - Florence
1974 - Florence
1973 - Venice
1972 - Torin
1971 - Venice
1970 - Florence
1969 - Mantua
1968 - Rome
1967 - Ravenna
1966 - Palermo
1965 - Florence
1964 - Genoa
1963 - Naples
1962 - Verona
1961 - Pisa
1960 - Trieste
1959 - Sorrento
1958 - Venice
1957 - Taormina
1956 - Rimini
1955 - Perugia
1954 - Florence
1953 - Palermo
1952 - Milan
1951 - Naples
1950 - Turin
1949 - Venice
1948 - Capri

== List of laureates ==
- 1955: Claude Aveline
- 1956: Tony Schwartz
- 1959: George Selwyn English
- 1965: Raymond Raikes
- 1966: Nigel Butterley
- 1967: Krzysztof Penderecki
- 1970: Bent Lorentzen
- 1978: Roland Joffé
- 1980: Marian Finucane
  Eric Salzman
  Tony Palmer
- 1981: Tony Palmer
- 1982: Luciano Berio
- 1984: Peter Brook
- 1989 Leslie Megahey
- 1995: Jean-Louis Agobet (composer) – Special Prize
- 1999: Stephen Poliakoff
- 2001: Hannes Råstam
- 2002: Filip Šovagović
- 2003: Colin Black
- 2005: Jonathan Mills
- 2009: Jovanka Trbojević
- 2010: Benjamin Dupé
- 2013: Paolo Pietropaolo
- 2015: Oleg Troyanovsky
- 2016: Erik van Empel

== Bibliography ==
- Amelia Belloni Sonzogni, Cultura e qualità di rete. Storia del Prix Italia 1948 - 2008, UNI Service, 2008, ISBN 978-88-6178-214-3.
