= Anton Batagov =

Russian composer

Anton Aleksandrovich Batagov
- Антон Александрович Батагов
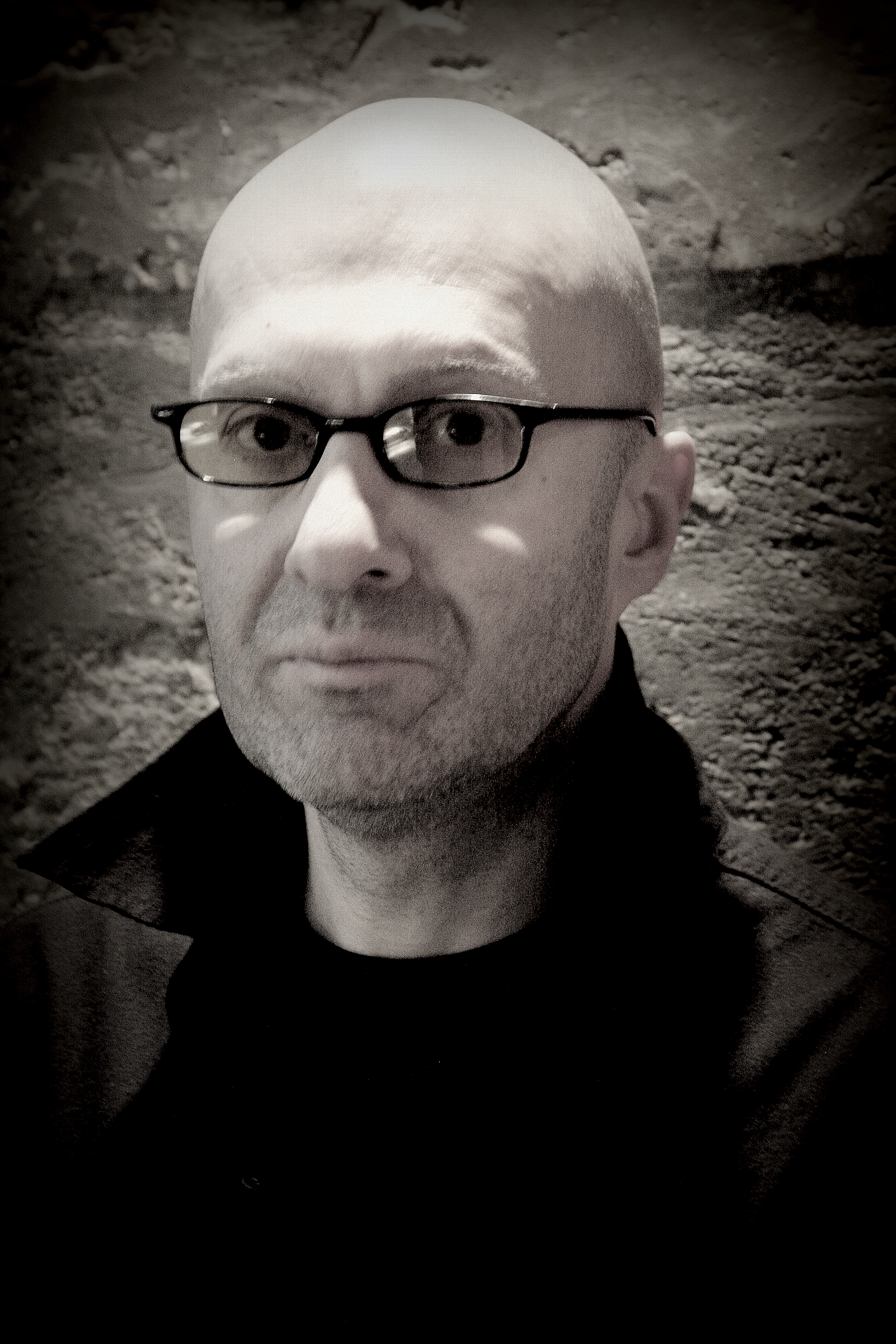
- Anton Batagov in 2012
- Born: October 10, 1965 (age 60)
- Education: Gnessin School of Music, Moscow Tchaikovsky Conservatory
- Occupations: Pianist, post-minimalist composer

Anton Batagov (born 10 October 1965) is a Russian pianist and post-minimalist composer. "One of the most significant and unusual figures of Russian contemporary music", according to 'Newsweek's Russian edition in 1997, Batagov is an influential Russian composer and performer.

== Biography ==
A graduate of the Gnessin School and the Moscow Tchaikovsky Conservatory and prize-winner at the International Tchaikovsky Competition (1986) and other competitions, Batagov introduced music by John Cage, Morton Feldman, Steve Reich and Philip Glass to Russian audiences. From 1989 to 1996 Batagov was the artistic director of the festival of Alternativa, a festival of contemporary music. Batagov's work has been influential on the understanding of classical and new music in Russia.

In 1997 he stopped performing live for 12 years to focus on composition and studio recordings.

The style of Batagov's post-minimalist compositions is rooted in the harmonic and rhythmic patterns of Russian church bells and folk songs seamlessly mixed with the spirit of Buddhist philosophy and the dynamic pulse of early Soviet avant-garde. His discography includes over 50 albums. Batagov is the author of several movie soundtracks, and original music for major Russian TV channels.

In 2009 he returned to live performances. Since then, he has been performing a series of unique solo piano programs. His repertoire includes works by Bach, Pachelbel, Purcell and early English music, Mozart, Schubert, Debussy, as well as many other composers, and his numerous piano compositions. He has performed at The Grand Hall of Moscow Conservatory and The Grand Hall of St.Petersburg Philharmonie, Moscow International House of Music and Zaryadye Hall, Brooklyn Academy of Music (New York), Jordan Hall (Boston), and Bing Concert Hall (Palo Alto, CA), Elbphilharmonie (Hamburg), The Berliner Philharmonie and Philharmonie de Paris, Musiikkitalo (Helsinki) and Reduta Hall (Bratislava), Teatro Regio (Parma, Italy) and Palau de la Música Catalana (Barcelona, Spain), and many other venues. The list of festivals he has participated in includes Salzburg Festival (Austria, Diaghilev Festival (Perm, Russia), Ruhrtriennale (Essen, Germany), Next Wave and Bang on a Can (New York), Glass at 80 (University of North Carolina), Aarhus 2017 Festival (Aarhus, Denmark), and others.

Anton Batagov is one of the closest collaborators of Philip Glass, one of the leading performers of his music. He has been touring internationally with Glass for almost a decade. His Glass albums have received worldwide recognition.

Anton Batagov's compositions have been performed and recorded by outstanding Russian classical and rock musicians and orchestras. Numerous musicological articles and dissertations have been written about his music. The philosophy of Batagov's projects eliminates any boundaries between "performance" and "composition" by viewing all existing musical practices—from ancient rituals to rock and pop culture and advanced computer technologies—as inseparable elements of his work.

== Discography ==
Music by Anton Batagov

- I was looking at green trees for a long time (1994)
- Music for December (1998)
- Best Before 02.2000 (2000)
- Prayers and Dances (2001)
- Music for the 35 Buddhas (2001)
- The Wheel of the Law (2002)
- Music for Piano (2003)
- Save Changes Before Closing? (2003)
- Symphony.ru (2003)
- From the Beginning up to the End (2004)
- Tetractys (2004)
- Music for Films (2005)
- Passionate Desire to Be an Angel (2006)
- Breathing In Breathing Out (original motion picture soundtrack) (2007)
- The Monk Thogmey's Thirty-Seven Precepts (2007)
- The Musicmaker's Contract (NTV/NTV+ channels greatest hits) (2007)
- ab & xmz. The Piano And Other Sounds (2008)
- Lama Sonam Dorje & Anton Batagov. Daily Practice (2008)
- Bodhicharyavatara (with Telo Tulku Rinpoche) (2009)
- ab & xmz II (2009)
- Tayatha (Yungchen Lhamo & Anton Batagov ) (2013)
- Selected Letters of Sergei Rachmaninoff (2013)
- Post Production (2014)
- I Fear No More. Selected songs and meditations of John Donne (2015)
- The One Thus Gone (2017)
- Where We Are Not. Letters of Mother Seraphima (2017)
- 16+ (Female poetry through the ages) (Nadine Koutcher / Anton Batagov) (2019)
- Disquiet (Music for Ivan Vyrypaev's drama) (2019)
- Made in 1993: The Art of Sampling (2020)
- Lamrim. A Prayer to the Gurus (EP, 2020)
- I See Your Dream. You See My Dream (EP, 2020)
- Invisible Lands (2020)
- Early Piano Works Revisited (2021)
- Optical Illusion (songs to the poetry of Alexander Pushkin and Daniil Kharms) (2021)
- Quietude and Joy As Envisioned by Russian Painters (2021)
- Bodhicharyavatara (Feat. Telo Tulku Rinpoche) (Remastered digital edition) (2022)
- Dialog (2022)
- The Last Alchemist (2023)
- The Well-Meditated Clavier (2023)
- Music for December (solo piano version) (EP, 2024)
- Tat Tvam Asi (2024)
- Samsara Ocean (2024)
- Bobeobi (2025)
- Strings, Piano (May 1994) (2025)
- Different Things (2025)
- The Well-Meditated Clavier, Book 2 (2026)

Music by various composers performed by Anton Batagov

- Messiaen: Vingt Regards sur l'Enfant-Jesus (1990)
- Rails (Russian avant-garde piano music) (1991)
- Bach: Die Kunst der Fuge (1993)
- Ravel: Piano works (1994)
- Alexandre Rabinovitch: Oeuvres pour piano (1994)
- The New Ravel (Ravel: Piano works) (1996)
- Yesterday (Russian post-minimalist piano music) (1998)
- Vladimir Martynov: Opus posth (1998)
- Sergei Zagny: Sonata (2000)
- Remix (Beethoven, Schubert, Bach) (2002)
- Morton Feldman: Triadic Memories (2003)
- The Battell (music of William Byrd and Johann Pachelbel) (2014)
- Alle Menschen Müssen Sterben (music of Johann Pachelbel) (2015)
- Prophecies (Music by Philip Glass from Einstein on the Beach and Koyaanisqatsi arranged for piano solo and performed by Anton Batagov) (2016)
- Tchaikovsky Competition 1986 (2016)
- BACH (Johann Sebastian Bach: Partitas No.4 & 6, Jesus bleibet meine Freude) (2017)
- Philip Glass: The Complete Etudes (2017)
- An Evening Hymn (Early English Music) (2018)
- Big My Secret (Piano recital: Rameau, Bach, Mozart, Nyman, Bull) (2018)
- Philip Glass: The Hours / Distant Figure (2018)
- Sunny Night (Piano recital: Rebikov, Debussy, Grieg, Chopin, Waters) (2020)
- Debussy. Preludes, Book 1 (Live) (2020)
- SCHUBERT (Franz Schubert: Sonate in B flat major and other works) (2021)
- One Two Three. Music in triple time (Piano recital: Bach, Satie, Tchaikovsky, Scarlatti, Rachmaninoff, Ravel, Beethoven, Bach) (2021)
- Seven Works of Johann Pachelbel (Live in Princeton) (2025)
- Philip Glass: Prison And Protest (2026)
