= George English (tenor) =

Australian musician (1882–1972)

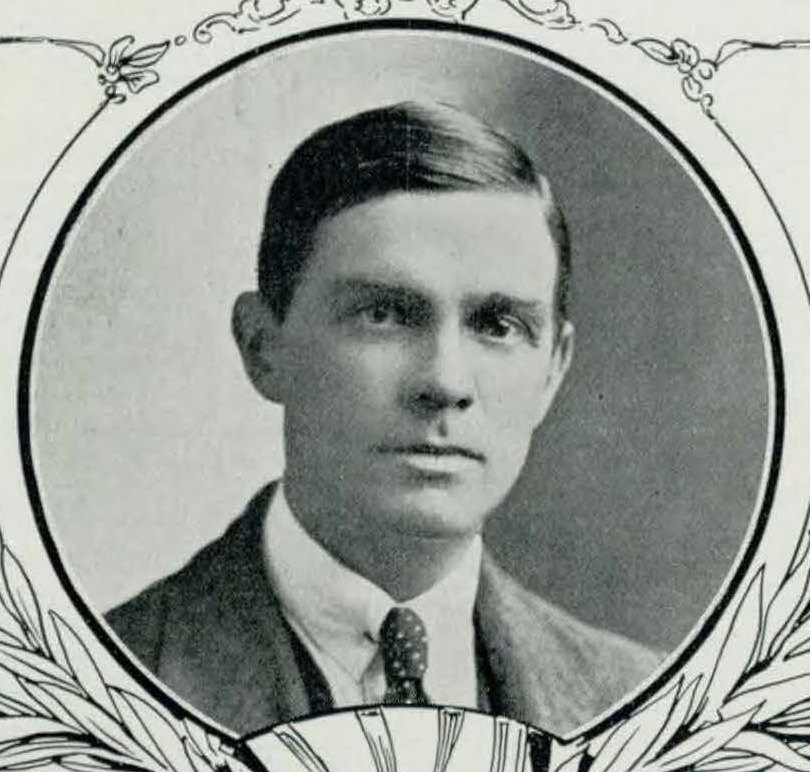
George English c.1920

George Philip John Engisch (1882–1972), later English, was an Australian tenor soloist, composer and conductor. His two symphonies of the early 1930s (No. 1 of 1932 and No. 2 of 1933) represent the late-Romantic style just like the better-known late symphonies by Alfred Hill.

English was born in Sydney but later resided in Melbourne. He moved to Brisbane in the 1940s and established the Brisbane Opera Guild.

He sang in J.S. Bach's St Matthew Passion and Christmas oratorios. In the late 1910s he sung the tenor parts in Hector Berlioz's La damnation de Faust with the Sydney Philharmonic. By 1920 he was tenor soloist at St. Paul's Cathedral in Melbourne.

In May 1920 he participated in the Beethoven Festival organized by the New South Wales Conservatorium being the soloist in Beethoven's Missa solemnis (on 15 May).

He married Marjorie Blanche, née Hodgson. They had a son, George Selwyn English, who also became a composer. The pair divorced in 1929, which resulted in financial difficulties.

In 1935 the University of Melbourne decided to establish a Bach Society under the direction of Professor Bernard Heinze and the conductorship of George English.

On 10 May 1939 he was before the bankruptcy court in Melbourne. In June he was transferred by the ABC to Sydney.

In 1942 he was appointed conductor of the Queensland State and Municipal Choir (in succession to E.R.B. Jordan). The first rehearsal took place at the beginning of August.

George English was Conductor of the Heidelberg District Musical Society from 1924 to 1926. He also conducted the Victorian Postal Institute Choir.

== Compositions ==
Both Symphony No. 1 and Symphony No. 2 by George English were performed by the Melbourne Symphony Orchestra under his direction at the Melbourne Centenary Celebrations (1934). His oratorio Armageddon was performed on 9 November 1941. In 1947 he composed a String Quartet, which got its first public performance on 30 October 1950 in Brisbane Albert Hall by the Queensland State String Quartet. He also composed several songs.

- The Six-starred flag of Anzac for 2 voices and piano (1919)
- Symphony No. 1 in A major, Op. 4 (1932)
- Symphony No. 2 in D minor, Op. 5 (1933)
- Armageddon, oratorio for SATB, mixed choir and orchestra (1941)
- String Quartet in F major (1947, premiered 1950)
- Six negro spirituals arranged as part songs (SATB)

== Sources ==
- Rhoderick McNeill (23 March 2016). The Australian Symphony from Federation to 1960. Routledge. pp. 72–74. ISBN 978-1-317-04087-3.
