= Sergei Zagny =

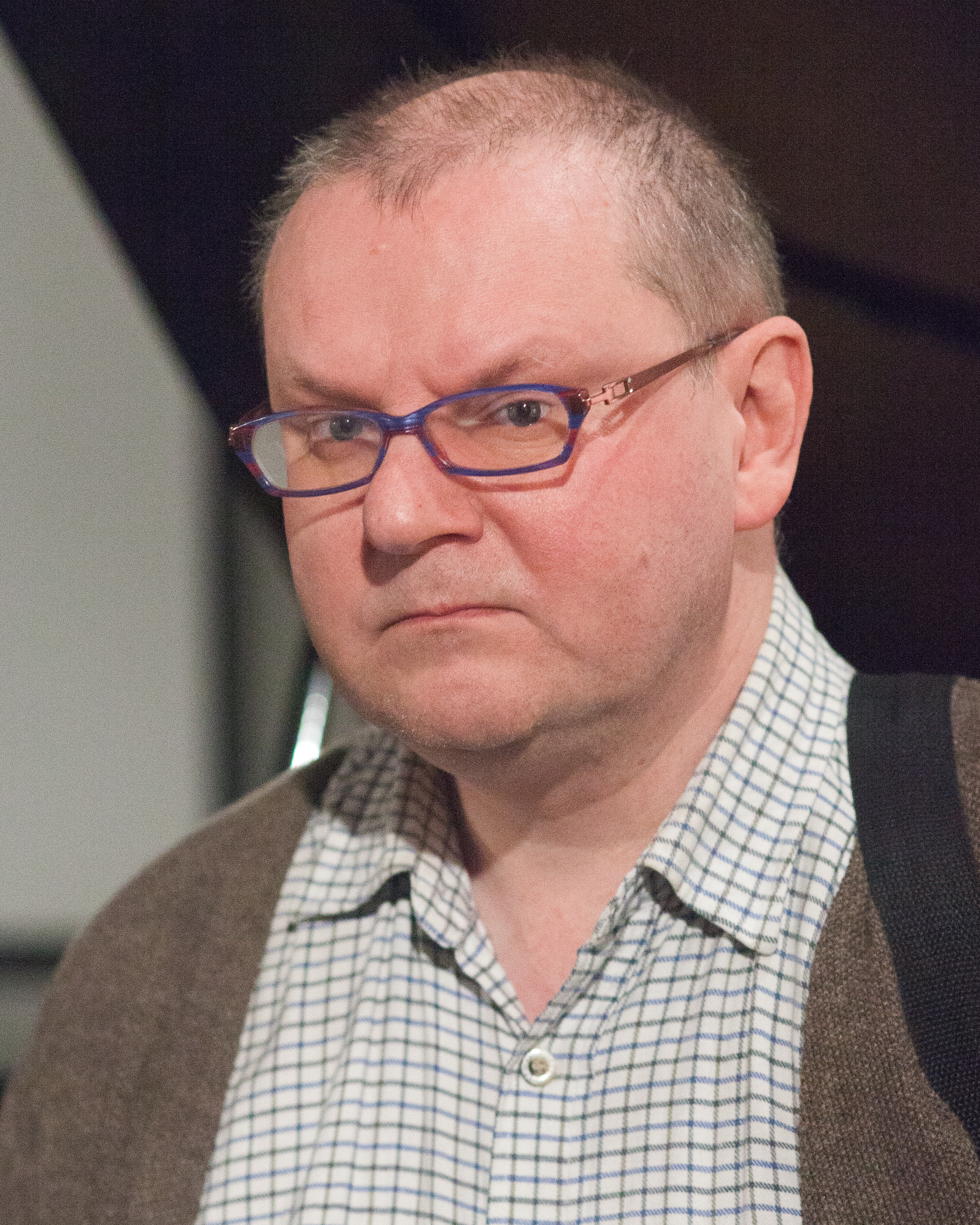
- Zagny in 2014

Background information
- Born: 1960 (age 65–66); Moscow, Soviet Union
- Genres: Contemporary classical music, minimalism
- Occupations: Composer, music theorist, educator

Sergei Zagny (Russian: Сергей Анатольевич Загний; born 1960) is a Russian composer, music theorist and educator. His work has been discussed in connection with Russian minimalism, conceptual music and composition based on mathematical and logical structures. Musicologist Tara Wilson identifies Zagny, alongside Anton Batagov and Pavel Karmanov, as a major figure in the second generation of Russian minimalism, while Margarita Katunian includes him among the composers through whom Russian minimalism developed distinct individual forms. Zagny has taught at the Moscow Conservatory since 1992.

== Biography and career ==
Zagny was born in Moscow in 1960. He graduated from the Moscow Conservatory in 1988, studying composition with Albert Leman and musicology with Vsevolod Zaderatsky. From 1988 to 1991 he continued postgraduate study in composition under Leman, and then in the spring of 1992 he joined the conservatory's composition department where he has taught polyphony, harmony and musical form ever since.

In 1992 Zagny received the First Russian John Cage Prize.

On 14 May 1992, pianist Anton Batagov performed Zagny's Sonata at Bang on a Can in New York, as part of the programme 1 Hour of Beautiful Piano Music at the New York Society for Ethical Culture.

Alongside his work as a composer, Zagny has published writings on music theory. His article "Imitation: Traditional and Nontraditional Transformations of Melodies" appeared in Perspectives of New Music in 1999, and "Magic Stars and Their Components" was published in the proceedings of the 2006 Bridges conference in London.

== Music ==
Zagny is regularly discussed in scholarship on Russian minimalism, although the label does not encompass his entire output. Wilson places him, Batagov and Karmanov among the principal representatives of its second generation. Katunian similarly includes Zagny in her account of Russian minimalism but describes his relationship to it more narrowly: she identifies early works such as the Sonata of 1990 with minimalist techniques, while noting that his subsequent interests became considerably broader.

Katunian describes this later work as increasingly experimental and conceptual. She cites Electronic Music No. 5 and other compositions in which Zagny explored the limits of freedom in the choice and manipulation of musical material, including the use of algorithms and combinatorial procedures.

A substantial part of Zagny's work has involved relationships between mathematical structures and musical composition. Musicologist Gilbert Delor places Zagny, Tom Johnson and Luiz Henrique Yudo within a tendency he calls "formalist minimalism", characterized by compositions governed by rational systems, and these compositions are based on logical rules. Delor discusses Zagny's Magic Stars, a long-term project developed between 1982 and 2008 and comprising a large collection of piano pieces.

The project is based on six mathematical six-pointed "magic stars", each containing the numbers 1 through 12 arranged so that the four numbers on each line have the same sum. Zagny mapped these numbers onto the twelve pitches of the chromatic scale and derived musical structures from different components of the stars. Although the pitch structures are systematically determined, aspects of their temporal realization are left free to the performer. Delor observes that the mathematical symmetry underlying the pieces is often impossible to perceive directly in the resulting music. Zagny himself described the construction of the work in his paper "Magic Stars and Their Components".

Katunian discusses Metamusica (2001) as an example of Zagny's movement toward conceptual and performative forms. The work includes a verbal text read by the composer, so that the presentation of the score becomes part of a performance. Its subject matter includes authorship, sound and silence, the legacy of John Cage, and the relationship between minimalist reduction and conceptualism. Katunian interprets the piece as extending reduction beyond musical material into the manipulation of concepts themselves.

In 2008 Zagny participated in Teodor Currentzis’s Requiem Without Borders project at the Territory festival, in which contemporary composers were invited to contribute music in response to the unfinished portions of Mozart’s Requiem. Of the four invited composers, works by Zagny and Vladimir Nikolayev were ultimately written and performed. Zagny contributed Benedictus and Hosanna. Katunian describes the former as employing strict, archaic contrapuntal writing with elements of hocket, while Hosanna replaces the Latin liturgical text with a Russian text set in simple recurring phrases for high female voices.

Composer Tom Johnson has also discussed Zagny in the context of European minimalism. Writing in The Journal of Music, Johnson characterized Zagny’s output as stylistically varied but predominantly minimal and described The Bells as a sound landscape centered on distant church bells together with environmental sounds.

== Selected works ==
- Sonata (1990)
- Electronic Music No. 5
- Magic Stars (1982–2008)
- Metamusica (2001)
- Benedictus and Hosanna (2008)
- The Bells

== Selected writings ==
- Zagny, Sergei. "Imitation: Traditional and Nontraditional Transformations of Melodies." Perspectives of New Music, vol. 37, no. 2, 1999, pp. 163–187.
- Zagny, Sergei. "Magic Stars and Their Components." Bridges London: Mathematics, Music, Art, Architecture, Culture, 2006, pp. 69–72.
- Zagny, Sergei. "Introduction to Quarter-Tone Tonality." Symmetry: Culture and Science, vol. 28, no. 1, 2017, pp. 89–93.
- Zagny, Sergei. "Extended Theory of Imitation and Canon, or New Methods of Transforming Proposta into Risposta." Journal of Moscow Conservatory, vol. 13, no. 2, 2022, pp. 382–403.
