= Symphony No. 1 (G. English) =

1932 musical composition

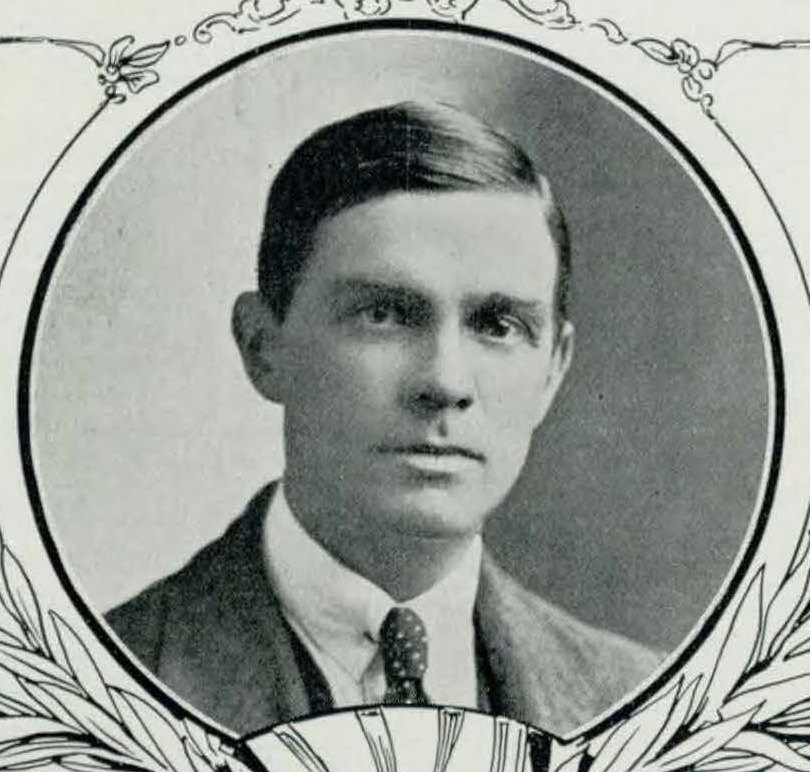
George English c.1920

Symphony No. 1 in A major, Op. 4 was composed by George English in early 1932 (from 1 January to 28 April). It uses Romantic material and shows various influences including Brahms, Wagner, Richard Strauss, Elgar, Delius and Faure. It was never performed after 1945, and, according to Rhoderick McNeill, it is interesting and deserves a revival. The approximate duration is 28 minutes.

== History ==
Like English's Symphony No. 2, this symphony was performed by the Melbourne Symphony Orchestra under the composer's direction during the Melbourne Centenary Celebrations (1934). On 30 June 1935 another performance of the First followed, this time by the City of Sydney Orchestra again with the composer conducting. The same concert included Andante con espressione from English's Symphony No. 2. Both works had favorable reviews. The symphony was broadcast for the last time on 24 February 1945.

The full score of the symphony is at the National Library of Australia. It consists of 106 pages, bears the dates of compositions and timing.

== Scoring ==
The symphony is scored for double woodwind (second flute being interchangeable with piccolo), 4 horns, 3 trumpets, 3 trombones, tuba, timpani and strings.

== Structure ==
The symphony consists of four movements, first two of which are played without a pause.

1. Moderato espressivo (A major)
2. Allegretto moderato vivace (A major)
3. Adagio con espressione (D minor)
4. Con brio moderato

== Analysis ==
English uses late Romantic harmonies, including secondary sevenths and occasional passages of chromatic dissonance. Unlike his contemporaries Alfred Hill and Robert Dalley-Scarlett (Symphony in E♭ major Alla Haydn, 1932), who composed in generally the same Romantic style, he avoids sonata-form formulae. His style is linear and full-textured. Little evidence of impressionism or neo-classicism can be found in this work.

The first movement lasts about 6 minutes. It is a lyrical development of an arching two-bar melodic phrase and its descending tail, without any contracting episodes. Instead the material is worked in melodic sequences to several high points. It leads directly to the scherzo resembling with its duple metre a heavy-footed gigue. One can think of Hubert Parry's Symphony No. 3 here. The music passes many distant keys, while the scoring is heavy. Next comes the slow movement, whose tone is sentimental. The heavy brass of the scherzo are silent during this movement, resulting in a gentle and tender character of the music. This movement opens with a motive of seventh chords in parallel motion. The basic material is carried then through a series of different keys (opening D minor – C minor – D major – F♯ major – C major), and again there is no real contracting episode. The vigorous finale is for the most part in D major, though it ends in A major, the principal key of the symphony. The main melody of this is stated at first in a diatonic manner, but quite surprisingly is elaborated later with more complex harmonic language, which includes intermittent whole-tone inflections and crunchy parallel seventh chords. There is only one contrasting episode and some fluent sections of imitative counterpoint (though not becoming a formal fugato). The impetus is never relaxed, and the movement feels like a moto perpetuo.
