= Jovanka Trbojević =

Yugoslav-born Finnish composer

Jovanka Trbojević (March 27, 1963 – May 12, 2017) was a Yugoslavian-born Finnish composer.

== Early life and career ==
She was born in Bosnia and grew up in Belgrade. She studied at the Mokranjac Music School and continued with studies in piano at the Prague Music Academy and composition at the Sibelius Academy in Helsinki. She studied composition with Eero Hämeenniemi and Paavo Heininen in Helsinki.

She composed chamber music, orchestral music and operas as well as music for film and television. Her radiophonic work Creation Game received the Prix Italia. Her Opera Absurdium was first presented at the 2014 Time of Music festival in Viitasaari. Other works include In the View of the Wise for voices, Orgone Accumulator and Vertigo for orchestra and Heart in a Plastic Bag, a chamber opera.

== Death ==
Trbojević died in Helsinki at the age of 54.
