= George Selwyn English =

Australian composer

George Selwyn English (16 September 1912 – 8 October 1980) was an Australian composer. Like Roy Agnew and Raymond Hanson, he was overshadowed by the Australian avant-garde of the 1960s.

== Life ==
English was born in Sydney, his parents being George Philip John Engisch (later English), a tenor, conductor and late-Romantic composer, and Marjorie Blanche, née Hodgson (they divorced in 1929). He was educated at Malvern Church of England Grammar and Melbourne High schools. Initial music education was provided by his father, but partly it was due to the boy's own efforts, as after the divorce his mother vetoed proper training.

In 1935–1939 he resided in Britain, studying in libraries, attending concerts and working as music critic. He was also the founder and editor of the British Motorist magazine.

In 1939 English returned to Sydney and worked for Amalgamated Wireless (Australasia) Ltd. On 14 July 1942 he was enlisted in the Royal Australian Air Force, but was soon (23 December) discharged on medical grounds. He worked as a critic for Sydney newspapers, then became chief editor for W. H. Paling & Co. Ltd. (musical publishers). At the same time he was composing and arranging music, especially for theatre, radio and films (this is what he is remembered today for).

While not a first-rate composer, English was very active in music politics. His posts included:

- founding president (1960) of the Fellowship of Australian Composers (later secretary and a long-time councillor)
- 'writer member' (1961–68) of the board of the Australasian Performing Right Association
- editor (1969–78) of the journal of the Australasian Performing Right Association

In 1961 he began to campaign for a musical counterpart of the Commonwealth Literary Fund and led in 1965 a delegation to meet Prime Minister Harold Holt and eventually made some success in 1967, when the Commonwealth Assistance to Australian Composers Advisory Board was established.

He died of cancer in Mosman, aged 68, and was buried in Northern Suburbs cemetery.

== Family ==
On 19 December 1936 English married Clare Rosina Henkes in Hampstead. This marriage gave birth to a son and a daughter. They divorced 40 years later (1975), and he married at Cremorne Marcia Clement Rose, an advertising executive.

== Compositions and style ==
English wrote music to a movie Alice through the Centre (1950), which was followed by a documentary The Australian Dingo (1958), a radio Death of a Wombat (it won a Prix Italia in 1959) and The First Waratah (1972).

His most notable serious compositions were created in 1960s: the overture Botany Bay 1770 (1960), Chiaroscuro for string trio (1966), a String Quartet (1966, inedited) and a Wind Quintet (1969). He also wrote at least two symphonies: an undated in A minor and a Sinfonia (1947 or 1967).

English's style was a tempered version of the English 1920s–1930s modernism. He was a skilled composer, though with limited imagination. Compositions written after the Chiaroscuro show 'a cautious acceptance of the principles of serialism'.

== A selective list of compositions ==
- Symphony in A minor (undated)
- Sinfonia (1947) for string orchestra
- For a Royal Occasion (1952), overture for full orchestra
- Song for a Crowning (1953), text by Elizabeth Riddell
- The Australian Dingo (1958), documentary film score
- Death of a Wombat (1959) for narrator and 10 instruments (won the Prix Italia), arranged as a miniature piano suite (Theme – Nocturne – Threnody)
- Botany Bay 1770 (1960), overture
- Chiaroscuro (1966) for string trio
- String Quartet (1966, inedited)
- Wind Quintet (1969)
- Alfresco miniature suite (pub. 1969), for 3 recorders (Pastorale – Wayfarers – Shepherd's song)
- The First Waratah for narrator, wind quintet and percussion (1972)
- Power with precision, documentary film score
- All manner of trains, documentary film score
- Yulunga for chamber orchestra
- Myuna Moon for chamber orchestra
- The Young Mozart, simple suite for piano (pub. 1956)
- Fantasia for orchestra
- Coach and horses for orchestra
- All school's songbook for unison and 2-part voices and piano

== Recordings ==
- (LP, mono, 1961) English: The Death of a Wombat; Robert Hughes: Sinfonietta. – Sydney Symphony Orchestra, cond. English (1) and Nicolai Malko (2). – RCA L16233

== Sources ==
- John Carmody. English, George Selwyn (1912–1980) / Australian Dictionary of Biography, National Centre of Biography, Australian National University, published first in hardcopy 1996
