= String Quartet in A major (Bliss) =

- Chamber music by Arthur Bliss
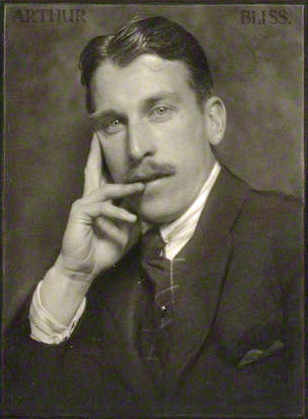
- The composer
- Catalogue: F. 23
- Opus: 4
- Composed: 1913
- Published: 1914
- Movements: three
- Scoring: violin; violin; viola; cello

Arthur Bliss's String Quartet in A major, Op. 4 (F. 23) is the first of four string quartets the composer wrote. (Note: In addition to this work, Bliss completed a string quartet in 1923/24, also withdrawn by the composer and which only survives in fragmentary form. Aside from this work and his acknowledged 1st (1941) and 2nd (1950) string quartets, there are two separate movements for string quartet: a fugue composed in 1916 and an allegro composed in 1927.) Composed in 1913 while Bliss was still a student at Cambridge, the work was withdrawn from performance by the composer in 1919, along with most of his pre-war chamber music, and not revived until the 1990s.

== Composition history ==
Like many of the composer's pre-World War I works, a certain amount of confusion existed about the composition's history. In the liner notes to the 1985 recording of the composer's 1st and 2nd string quartets, his friend George Dannatt wrote that the work had been completed in 1914, leading many to believe the piece was a wartime composition. Subsequent research shows that the work was composed about a year earlier.

Sam Ellis, in his thesis, writes that the work was probably completed while the composer was still at Cambridge, possibly revised while the composer studied under Charles Villiers Stanford at the Royal College of Music and that the first performance was given at Cambridge on 9 June 1914. Following this the composer made arrangements for the work to be published by Stainer & Bell as his Opus 4 with a dedication to Edward Dent, one of his tutors at Cambridge.

The quartet's next identified performance took place at the Aeolian Hall in London on 25 June 1915, (Note: Performed by the Philharmonic Quartet, as was the work's third performance.) with a third performance at the same location taking place on 12 November in the same year. The latter performance was attended by Lady Elgar, who wrote to the composer expressing her liking of the work's "eager life and exhilarating energy and hope".

Subsequent wartime performances have not been identified and when the composer returned from the war, it along with the majority of his pre-World War I compositions was withdrawn from performance. It was not until 1993 that his widow, Trudy, was persuaded to reverse the decision for this and several other early chamber works. This led to the first commercial recording, (Note: Performed by the Maggini Quartet.) released by Naxos in 2002 and republication of the quartet by Edition Peters.

== Instrumentation and structure ==
The work was composed for a standard string quartet and is in three movements:

1. Moderato ma tranquillo
2. Andante sostenuto
3. Allegro vivace con grazia

Typical performances take between 20 and 25 minutes.

Ellis, aside from identifying the quartet as likely being a student work, similar in character to the string quartets composed by John Ireland, in their analysis of the quartet's first two movements states that the work is entirely based on standard tonalities and modal harmonies (Note: Ellis specifically identifies the quartet as making use of the Phrygian, Lydian and Aeolian modes.) and while folksong is not directly quoted, the quartet evokes it by the musical devices used. This puts the work firmly within the English Pastoral School, a possible explanation for the composer's decision to withdraw the work following World War I, given that it and the other withdrawn works would have represented a musical direction he no longer wished to follow.

Ellis identified the most likely influences on the work as being Elgar, Vaughan Williams and French composers such as Ravel. Ellis attributes the work's "Classical simplicity" to either the influence of his teachers at Cambridge, Charles Wood and Edward Dent, the quartet's eventual dedicatee, a noted expert on Mozart, or simply to the composer's inexperience at this stage in his development.

== Reception ==
Aside from Lady Elgar's comment, no contemporary reaction to the pre-World War I performances has been located. Responses to the release of the Naxos recording in 2002, spoke positively of the quartet, with two reviewers, Neil Horner and Christa Norton, commenting that they preferred this work to the B-flat major quartet the composer acknowledged as his first. What all the reviewers commented on, as did John Quinn in his review of a live performance by the Carducci Quartet in 2019, was the composer's idiomatic writing for strings even at this early stage in his career.
