= Herbert Lambert =

British photographer

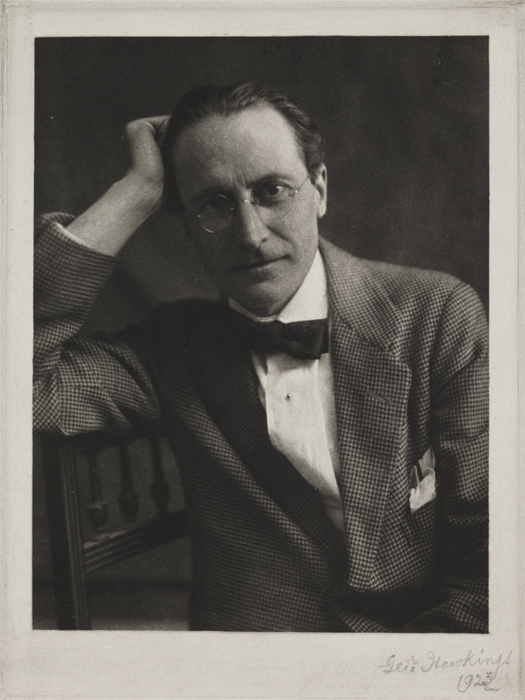
- Born: Herbert Richard Lambert; 1882; United Kingdom
- Died: 7 March 1936 (aged 53–54); United Kingdom
- Occupation: Photographer

Herbert Richard Lambert, FRPS, (1882 – 7 March 1936) was a British portrait photographer known for his portrayals of professional musicians and composers including Gustav Holst.

In 1923 he published Modern British Composers: Seventeen Portraits in collaboration with Sir Eugene Goossens, and in 1926, he became managing director of the Elliott & Fry portrait studio. In 1930, he published Studio portrait lighting, a technical guidebook. He is also responsible for salvaging much of the 19th-century photography of Henry Fox Talbot, by re-photographing the remains of Talbot's photographs.

In addition to photography, Lambert was also an amateur maker of musical instruments, specialising in harpsichords and clavichords. In 1927, he lent a clavichord which he had built to Herbert Howells; Howells used it to compose a 12-piece collection, which he named "Lambert's Clavichord".

Howells also introduced Lambert to Gerald Finzi, whose 1936 Interlude for oboe & string quartet, Op. 21 was inspired by Lambert.

A Quaker, Lambert was imprisoned as a conscientious objector during the First World War. He lived in Combe Down, Bath, Somerset.
