= Unvollendete =

Unvollendete is German for "Unfinished" and may refer to:

- Symphony No. 8 in B minor by Franz Schubert
- Symphony No. 10 by Gustav Mahler
- Symphony No. 10 in E-Flat major by Ludwig van Beethoven
