= Symphony No. 10 =

Symphony No. 10 may refer to:

- Symphony No. 10 (Beethoven/Cooper) in E-flat major, sketched by Ludwig van Beethoven, c. 1827, assembled by Barry Cooper, 1988
- Beethoven's Tenth, nickname of Symphony No. 1 (Brahms) in C minor (Op. 68) by Johannes Brahms, 1855–76
- Symphony No. 10 (Brian) in C minor by Havergal Brian, 1953–54
- Symphony No. 10 (Davies) (Op. 327, Alla ricerca di Borromini) by Peter Maxwell Davies, 2013
- Symphony No. 10 (Diamond) by David Diamond, 1987/2000
- Symphony No. 10 (Ficher) (Op. 131) by Jacobo Ficher, 1976–77
- Symphony No. 10 (Glass) by Philip Glass, 2011–12
- Symphony No. 10 (Haydn) in D major (Hoboken I/10) by Joseph Haydn, c. 1760
- Symphony No. 10 (Michael Haydn) in D major (Perger 45, Sherman 8, MH 69) by Michael Haydn, c. 1774
- Symphony No. 10 (Henze) by Hans Werner Henze, 1997–2000
- Symphony No. 10 (Holmboe) (M. 250) by Vagn Holmboe, 1970–2
- Symphony No. 10 (Hovhaness) (Op. 184, Vahaken) by Alan Hovhaness, 1959
- Symphony No. 10 (Mahler) in F-sharp major by Gustav Mahler 1910 (unfinished)
- Symphony No. 10 (Milhaud) (Op. 382) by Darius Milhaud, 1960
- Symphony No. 10 (Mozart) in G major (K. 74) by Wolfgang Amadeus Mozart, 1770
- Symphony No. 10 (Myaskovsky) in F minor (Op. 30) by Nikolai Myaskovsky, 1926–27
- Symphony No. 10 (Pettersson) by Allan Pettersson, 1971–72
- Symphony No. 10 (Raff) in F minor (Op. 213, Autumn) by Joachim Raff, 1879-1881
- Symphony No. 10 (Rubbra) (Op. 145, da Camera) by Edmund Rubbra
- Symphony No. 10 (Schubert) in D major (D 936A, The Last) by Franz Schubert, 1828 (unfinished)
- Symphony No. 10 (Schuman) (American Muse) by William Schuman, 1976
- Symphony No. 10 (Shostakovich) in E minor (Op. 93) by Dmitri Shostakovich, c. 1953
- Symphony No. 10 (Simpson) by Robert Simpson, 1988
- Symphony No. 10 (Villa-Lobos) (Sumé pater patrium: Sinfonia ameríndia com coros) by Heitor Villa-Lobos, 1952–53
