= Cadence =

End of a musical phrase with resolution

The final two chords present an authentic (or perfect) cadence with roots in the bass lines and the tonic note in the highest voice of the final chord): the three chords are a ii–V–I progression in C major, in four-part harmony.

In Western musical theory, a cadence (from Latin cadentia 'a falling') is the end of a phrase in which the melody or harmony creates a sense of full or partial resolution, especially in music of the 16th century onwards. A harmonic cadence is a progression of two or more chords that concludes a phrase, section, or piece of music. A rhythmic cadence is a characteristic rhythmic pattern that indicates the end of a phrase. A cadence can be labeled "weak" or "strong" depending on the impression of finality it gives.

While cadences are usually classified by specific chord or melodic progressions, the use of such progressions does not necessarily constitute a cadence—there must be a sense of closure, as at the end of a phrase. Harmonic rhythm plays an important part in determining where a cadence occurs. The word "cadence" sometimes slightly shifts its meaning depending on the context; for example, it can be used to refer to the last few notes of a particular phrase, or to just the final chord of that phrase, or to types of chord progressions that are suitable for phrase endings in general.

Cadences are strong indicators of the tonic or central pitch of a passage or piece. The musicologist Edward Lowinsky proposed that the cadence was the "cradle of tonality".

== Nomenclature across the world ==
Terms used for cadences
US usage	British usage	Spanish usage	Italian usage	French usage	German usage	Typical harmonic sequence
authentic cadence	perfect cadence	cadencia auténtica	cadenza perfetta	cadence parfaite	Ganzschluss	V → I or V7 → I (dominant to tonic or dominant seventh to tonic)
half cadence	imperfect cadence	semicadencia	cadenza sospesa	demi-cadence	Halbschluss	I, II, IV or VI → V (tonic, supertonic, subdominant or submediant to dominant)
plagal cadence	plagal cadence	cadencia plagal	cadenza plagale	cadence plagale	plagale Kadenz	IV → I (subdominant to tonic)
deceptive cadence	interrupted cadence	cadencia rota	cadenza d'inganno	cadence rompue	Trugschluss	V → vi or V7 → vi (dominant to submediant or dominant seventh to submediant)

== Common classifications ==
Cadences are divided into four main types, according to their harmonic progression: authentic (typically perfect authentic or imperfect authentic), half, plagal, and deceptive. Typically, phrases end on authentic or half cadences, and the terms plagal and deceptive refer to motion that avoids or follows a phrase-ending cadence. Each cadence can be described using the Roman numeral system of naming chords.

=== Authentic cadence ===
The final two chords represent a perfect authentic cadence; from Beethoven's Piano Sonata No. 8, mvmt. III, mm. 16–17.

An authentic cadence is a cadence from a dominant-functioning chord (commonly V) to the tonic chord (I). During the dominant chord, a seventh above the dominant may be added to create a dominant seventh chord (V^{7}); other dominant-functioning chords such as a leading tone triad or seventh chord can also take its place. The dominant chord may also be preceded by a cadential ^{6}_{4} chord. The Harvard Concise Dictionary of Music and Musicians says, "This cadence is a microcosm of the tonal system, and is the most direct means of establishing a pitch as tonic. It is virtually obligatory as the final structural cadence of a tonal work." Authentic cadences are generally classified as either perfect or imperfect. The phrase perfect cadence is sometimes used as a synonym for authentic cadence but can also have a more precise meaning depending on the chord voicing.

==== Perfect authentic cadence ====
In a perfect authentic cadence (PAC), the chords are in root position – that is, the roots of both chords are in the bass – and the tonic is in the highest voice of the final chord. This is generally considered the strongest type of cadence and often found at structurally defining moments. Music theorist William Caplin writes that the perfect authentic cadence "achieves complete harmonic and melodic closure."

==== Imperfect authentic cadence ====
There are three types of imperfect authentic cadences (IAC):

- Root position IAC (shown below): Similar to a perfect authentic cadence, but the highest voice is not the tonic.
- Inverted IAC: Similar to a perfect authentic cadence, but one or both chords are inverted.
- Leading-tone IAC: The penultimate (V) chord is replaced with a chord based on the leading-tone (vii^{o} chord).

Note that in many recent theories (William Caplin's Theory of Formal Functions, Janet Schmalfeldt's "Becoming," and James Hepokoski and Warren Darcy's Sonata Theory, the latter two categories of IAC are categorized as non-cadential (see evaded cadence, below).

===== Evaded cadence =====
An evaded cadence (a subtype of the inverted IAC) moves from a dominant seventh third inversion chord (V^{4}_{2}) to a first inversion tonic chord (I^{6}). Because the seventh of the dominant chord must fall stepwise to the third of the tonic chord, it forces the cadence to resolve to the less stable first inversion chord. To achieve this, a root position V usually changes to a V^{4}_{2} right before resolution, thereby "evading" the root-position I chord that would usually follow a root-position V. (See also inverted cadence below.)

=== Half cadence ===
A half cadence (also called an imperfect cadence or semicadence) is any cadence ending on V, whether preceded by II (V of V), ii, vi, IV, or I—or any other chord. Because it sounds incomplete or suspended, the half cadence is considered a weak cadence that calls for continuation.

Several types of half cadences are described below.

==== Phrygian half cadence ====
The last two chords represent a Phrygian half cadence in J. S. Bach's four-part chorale, Schau, lieber Gott, wie meine Feind.

A Phrygian half cadence is a half cadence iv^{6}–V in minor, so named because the semitonal motion in the bass (sixth degree to fifth degree) resembles the half-step heard in the ii–I of the 15th-century cadence in the Phrygian mode. Due to its being a survival from modal Renaissance harmony this cadence gives an archaic sound, especially when preceded by v (v–iv^{6}–V). A characteristic gesture in Baroque music, the Phrygian cadence often concluded a slow movement immediately followed ("attacca") by a faster one.

==== Lydian cadence ====
A Lydian cadence is similar to the Phrygian half cadence, involving iv^{6}–V in the minor. The difference is that in the Lydian cadence, the whole iv^{6} is raised by a half step. In other words, the Phrygian half cadence begins with the first chord built on scale degree, while the Lydian half cadence is built on the scale degree ♯.

==== Burgundian cadences ====
Burgundian cadences became popular in Burgundian music. Note the parallel fourths between the upper voices.

==== Plagal half cadence ====
The rare plagal half cadence involves a I–IV progression. Like an authentic cadence (V–I), the plagal half cadence involves an ascending fourth (or, by inversion, a descending fifth). The plagal half cadence is a weak cadence, ordinarily at the ending of an antecedent phrase, after which a consequent phrase commences. One example of this use is in "Auld Lang Syne". But in one very unusual occurrence – the end of the exposition of the first movement of Johannes Brahms's Clarinet Trio, Op. 114—it is used to complete not just a musical phrase but an entire section of a movement.

=== Plagal cadence ===
A plagal cadence is a cadence from IV to I. It is also known as the Amen cadence because of its frequent setting to the text "Amen" in hymns.

William Caplin disputes the existence of plagal cadences in music of the classical era, although they begin to appear in the nineteenth century:

An examination of the classical repertory reveals that such a cadence rarely exists. ... Inasmuch as the progression IV–I cannot confirm a tonality (it lacks any leading-tone resolution), it cannot articulate formal closure .... Rather, this progression is normally part of a tonic prolongation serving a variety of formal functions – not, however a cadential one. Most examples of plagal cadences given in textbooks actually represent a postcadential codetta function: that is, the IV–I progression follows an authentic cadence but does not itself create genuine cadential closure.

The plagal cadence may be interpreted as I–V if the IV–I cadence is perceived as a modulation in which the IV chord becomes the I chord of the new tonic key and the I chord of the previous key is now a dominant chord in the modulated key. (Cf. §Half cadence above and Secondary dominant.)

==== Minor plagal cadence ====
A minor plagal cadence, also known as a perfect plagal cadence, uses the minor iv instead of a major IV. With a very similar voice leading to a perfect cadence, the minor plagal cadence is a strong resolution to the tonic.

==== Moravian cadence ====
The Moravian cadence, which can be found in the works of Leoš Janáček and Bohuslav Martinů amongst others, is a form of plagal cadence in which the outer notes of the first chord each move inwards by a tone to the second. (IV^{add6} → I^{6}). An early suggestion of the Moravian cadence in classical music occurs in Antonín Dvořák's New World Symphony.

=== Deceptive cadence ===
A deceptive cadence in the second movement of Mozart's Piano Sonata No. 10.

Also known as an interrupted or false cadence, the deceptive cadence is a cadence from V to any chord other than the tonic (I), usually the submediant (VI). This is the most important irregular resolution, most commonly V^{7}–vi (or V^{7}–♭VI) in major or V^{7}–VI in minor. This is considered a weak cadence because of the "hanging" (suspended) feeling it invokes.

At the beginning of the final movement of Gustav Mahler's 9th Symphony, the listener hears a string of many deceptive cadences progressing from V to IV^{6}.

One of the most striking uses of this cadence is in the A-minor section at the end of the exposition in the first movement of Johannes Brahms's Third Symphony. The music progresses to an implied E minor dominant (B^{7}) with a rapid chromatic scale upwards but suddenly sidesteps to C major. The same device is used again in the recapitulation; on that occasion the sidestep is—as one would expect—to F major, the tonic key of the whole Symphony.

The interrupted cadence is also frequently used in popular music. For example, the Pink Floyd song "Bring the Boys Back Home" ends with such a cadence (at approximately 0:45–50).

== Other classifications ==
=== Inverted cadence ===
An inverted cadence (also called a medial cadence) inverts the last chord. It may be restricted only to the perfect and imperfect cadence, or only to the perfect cadence, or it may apply to cadences of all types. To distinguish them from this form, the other, more common forms of cadences listed above are known as radical cadences.

=== Rhythmic classifications ===
Cadences can also be classified by their rhythmic position:

- A metrically accented cadence has its final note in a metrically strong position, typically the downbeat of a measure.
- A metrically unaccented cadence has its final note in a metrically weak position, for instance, after a long appoggiatura.

Metrically accented cadences are considered stronger and are generally of greater structural significance. In the past, the terms masculine and feminine were sometimes used to describe rhythmically "strong" or "weak" cadences, but these terms have not been generally used since at least the mid-1980s. Susan McClary has written extensively on the gendered terminology of music and music theory in her book Feminine Endings.

The example below shows a metrically unaccented cadence (IV–V–I). The final chord is postponed to fall on a weak beat.

=== Picardy third ===
A Picardy third (or Picardy cadence) is a harmonic device that originated in Western music in the Renaissance era. It refers to the use of a major chord of the tonic at the end of a musical section that is either modal or in a minor key. The example below shows a picardy third in the final chord, from J.S. Bach's Jesu, meine Freude (Jesus, My Joy), mm. 12–13.

=== Upper leading-tone cadence ===
Upper-leading tone trill

Diatonic trill

This example from a well-known 16th-century lamentation shows a cadence that appears to imply the use of an upper leading-tone, a debate over which was documented in Rome c. 1540. The final three written notes in the upper voice are printed B–C–D, in which case the customary trill on the second to last note should be played using D and C. However, convention implied that the written C should be played as a C♯ in this context, and a cadential trill of a whole tone on the second to last note would then require a D♯/E♭, the upper leading-tone of D♮. Presumably, the debate was over whether to use D♯–C♯ or D–C♯ for the trill.

== In medieval and Renaissance polyphony ==
Medieval and Renaissance cadences are based upon dyads rather than chords. The first theoretical mention of cadences comes from Guido of Arezzo's description of the occursus in his Micrologus, where he uses the term to mean where the two lines of a two-part polyphonic phrase end in a unison.

=== Clausula vera ===
A clausula vera cadence from Lassus's Beatus homo, mm. 34–35.

A clausula or clausula vera ("true close") is a dyadic or intervallic, rather than chordal or harmonic, cadence. In a clausula vera, two voices approach an octave or unison through stepwise motion in contrary motion.

A three-voice clausula vera from Palestrina's Magnificat Secundi Toni: Deposuit potentes, mm. 27–28.

In three voices, the third voice often adds a falling fifth creating a cadence similar to the authentic cadence in tonal music.

According to Carl Dahlhaus, "as late as the 13th century the half step was experienced as a problematic interval not easily understood, as the remainder between the perfect fourth and the ditone:

$$\frac{\frac43}{\left(\frac98\right)^2} = \frac{256}{243}$$

In a melodic half step, listeners of the time perceived no tendency of the lower tone toward the upper, or the upper toward the lower. The second tone was not the 'goal' of the first. Instead, musicians avoided the half step in clausulas because, to their ears, it lacked clarity as an interval. Beginning in the 13th century, cadences begin to require motion in one voice by half step and the other a whole step in contrary motion.

=== Plagal cadence ===
A plagal cadence was found occasionally as an interior cadence, with the lower voice in two-part writing moving up a perfect fifth or down a perfect fourth.

=== Rest ===
A rest in one voice may also be used as a weak interior cadence. The example below, Lassus's Qui vult venire post me, mm. 3–5, shows a rest in the third measure.

=== Evaded cadence ===
In counterpoint, an evaded cadence is one where one of the voices in a suspension does not resolve as expected, and the voices together resolve to a consonance other than an octave or unison (a perfect fifth, a sixth, or a third).

=== Corelli cadence ===
The Corelli cadence, or Corelli clash, named for its association with the violin music of the Corelli school, is a cadence characterized by a major and/or minor second clash between the tonic and the leading-tone or the tonic and supertonic. An example is shown below.

=== English cadence ===
Another "clash cadence", the English cadence, is a contrapuntal pattern particular to the authentic or perfect cadence. It features the blue seventh against the dominant chord, which in the key of C would be B♭ and G–B♮–D. Popular with English composers of the High Renaissance and Restoration periods in the 16th and 17th centuries, the English cadence is described as sounding archaic or old-fashioned. It was first given its name in the 20th century.

The hallmark of this device is the dissonant augmented octave (compound augmented unison) produced by a false relation between the split seventh scale degree, as shown below in an excerpt from O sacrum convivium by Thomas Tallis. The courtesy accidental on the tenor's G♮ is editorial.

=== Landini cadence ===
A Landini cadence (also known as a Landini sixth, Landini sixth cadence, or under-third cadence) is a cadence that was used extensively in the 14th and early 15th century. It is named after Francesco Landini, a composer who used them profusely. Similar to a clausula vera, it includes an escape tone in the upper voice, which briefly narrows the interval to a perfect fifth before the octave.

== Common practice period ==
The classical and romantic periods of musical history provide many examples of the way the different cadences are used in context.

=== Authentic cadences and half cadences ===
Mozart's Romanze from his Piano Concerto No. 20 follows a familiar pattern of a pair of phrases, one ending with a half (imperfect) cadence and the other with an authentic cadence:

Mozart, Romanze from Piano Concerto 20

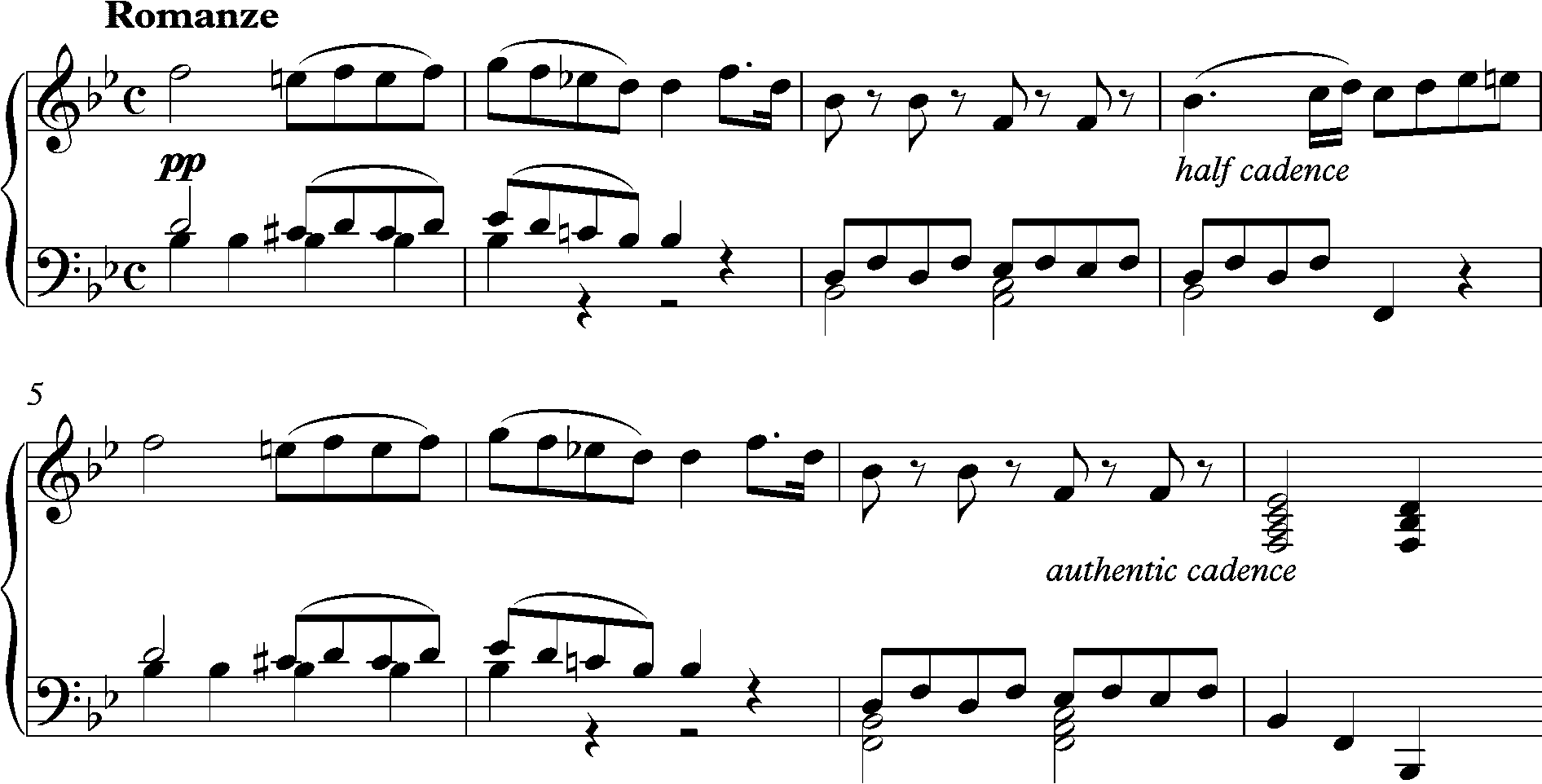
Mozart Romanze from Piano Concerto 20

The presto movement from Beethoven's String Quartet, Op 130 follows the same pattern, but in a minor key:

Beethoven, Presto from String Quartet Op. 130

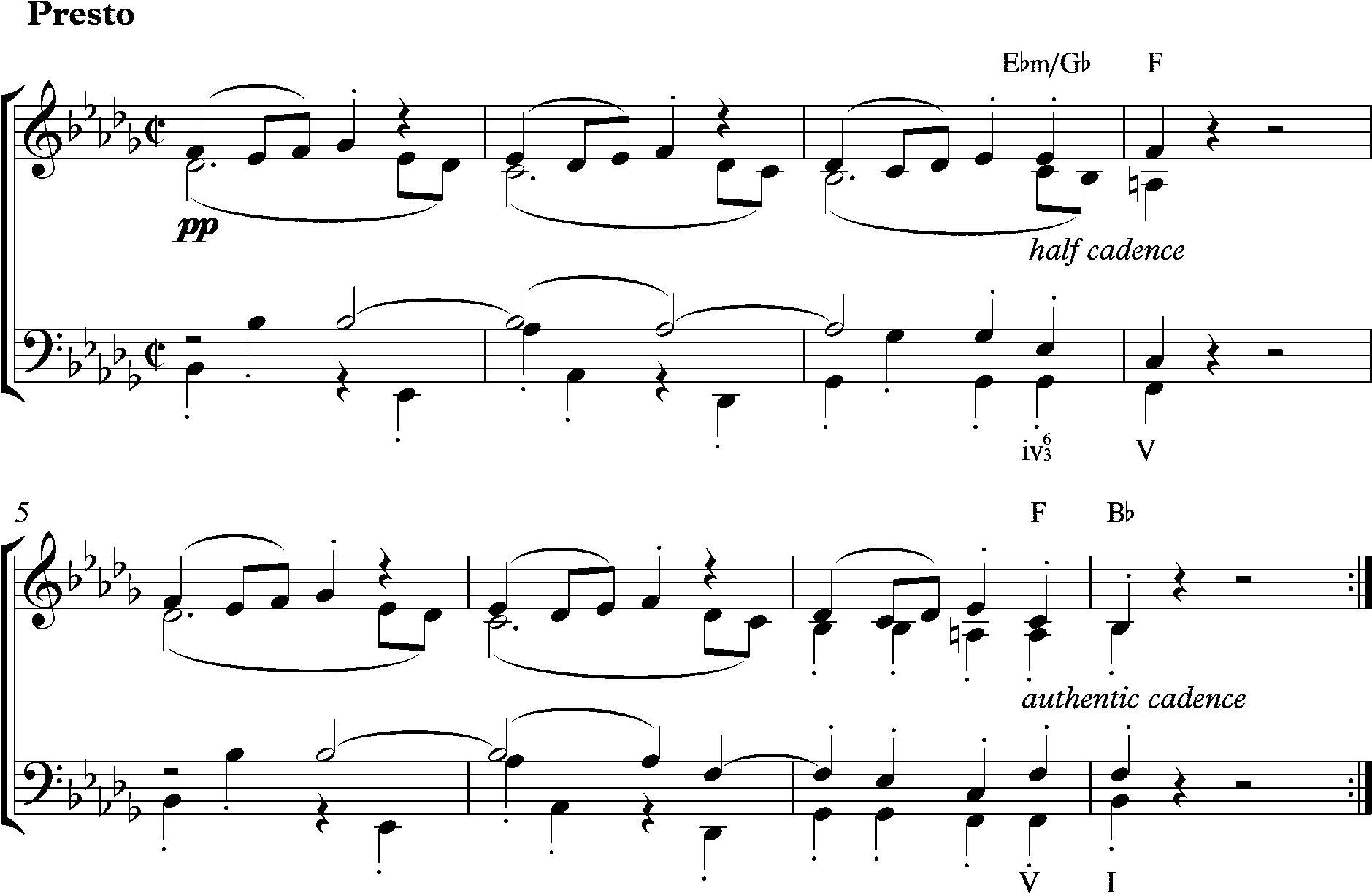
Beethoven Presto from String Quartet, Op. 130

=== Plagal cadences ===
The Hallelujah Chorus from Handel's Messiah culminates powerfully with an iterated plagal cadence:

Handel, Messiah, Hallelujah Chorus, closing bars

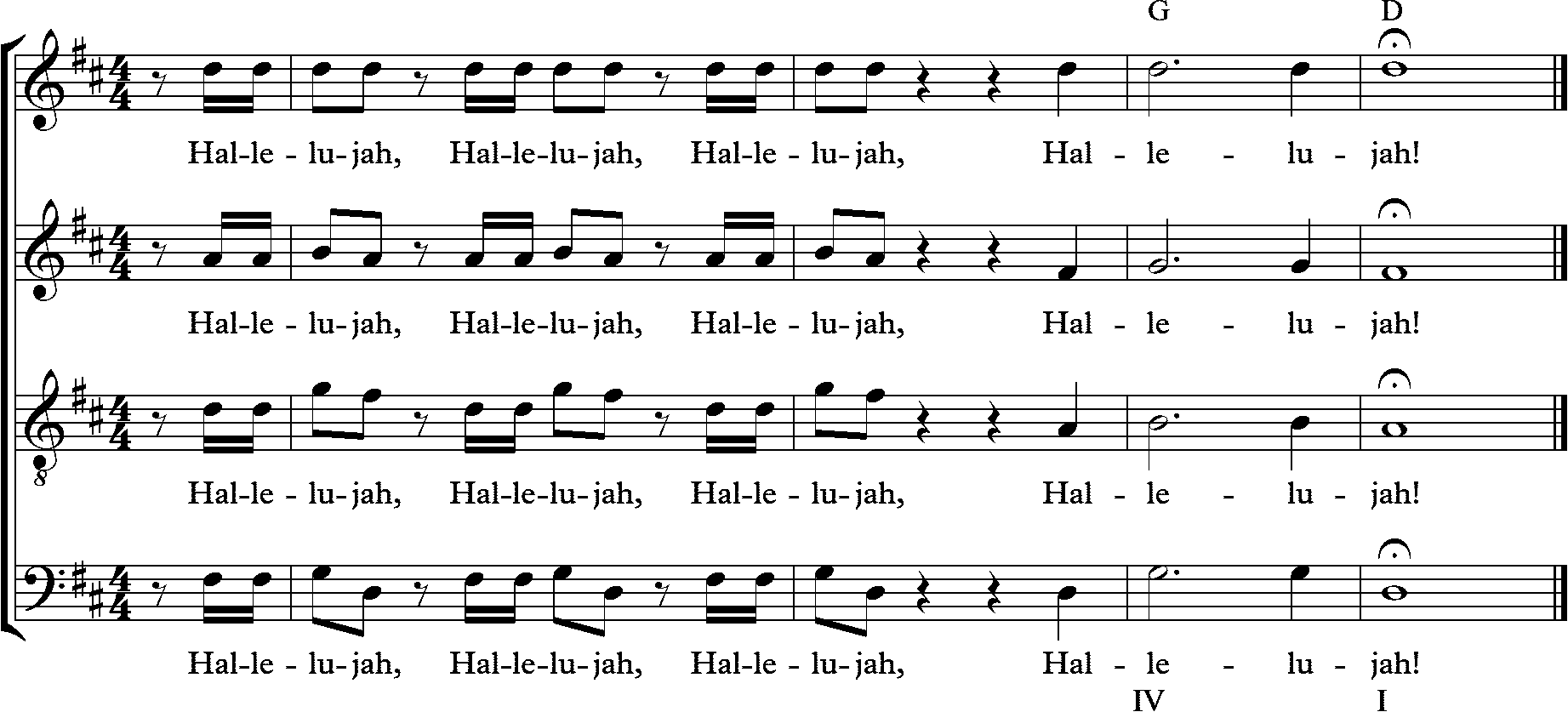
Handel, Messiah, Hallelujah Chorus closing bars

Debussy's piano prelude La fille aux cheveux de lin contains a plagal cadence in its 2nd and 3rd bars :

Debussy, La fille aux cheveux de lin, bars 1–4

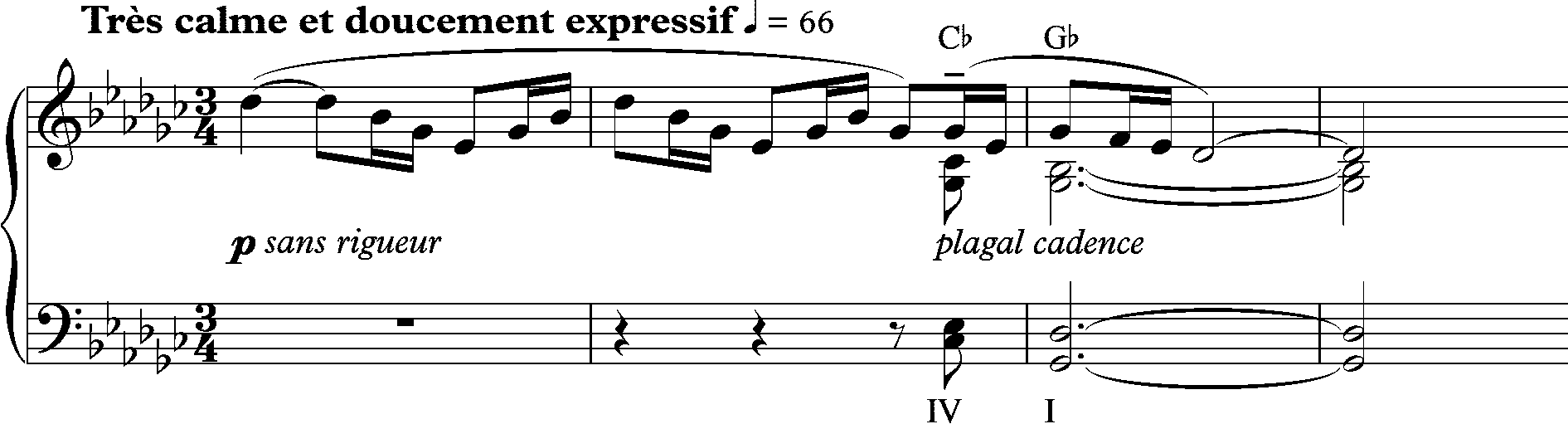
Debussy, La fille aux cheveux de lin, bars 1-4

One of the most famous endings in all music is found in the concluding bars of Wagner's opera Tristan und Isolde, where the dissonant chord in the opening phrase of the opera is finally resolved "three enormous acts and five hours later" in the form of a minor plagal cadence:

Wagner, Tristan und Isolde, Liebestod closing bars

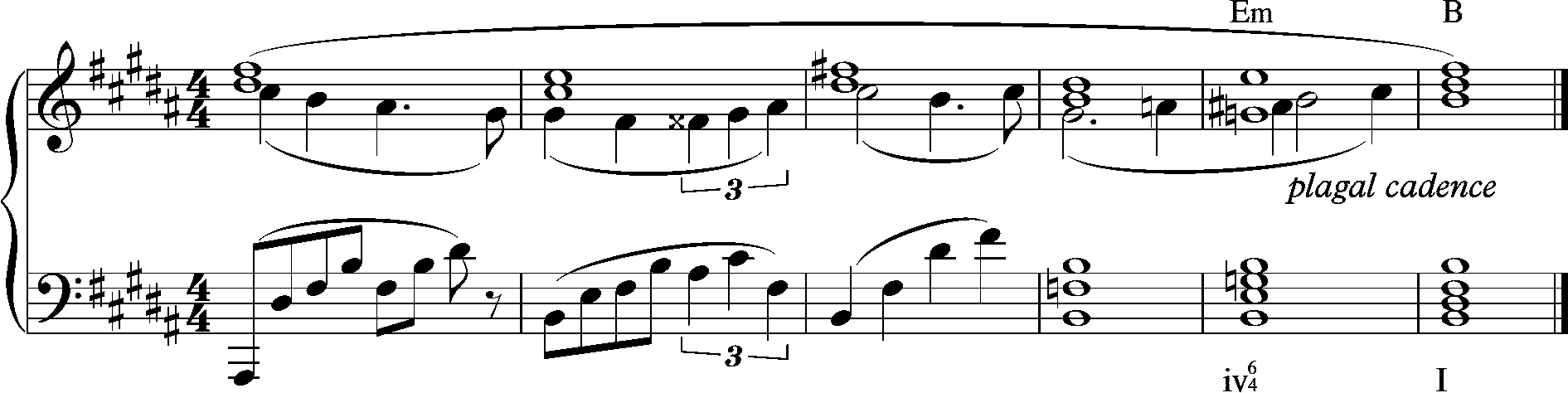
Wagner, Tristan und Isolde, Liebestod closing bars

=== Deceptive cadences ===
In J.S. Bach's harmonization of the chorale "Wachet auf", a phrase ending in a deceptive cadence repeats with the cadence changed to an authentic one:

J.S. Bach, chorale "Wachet auf"

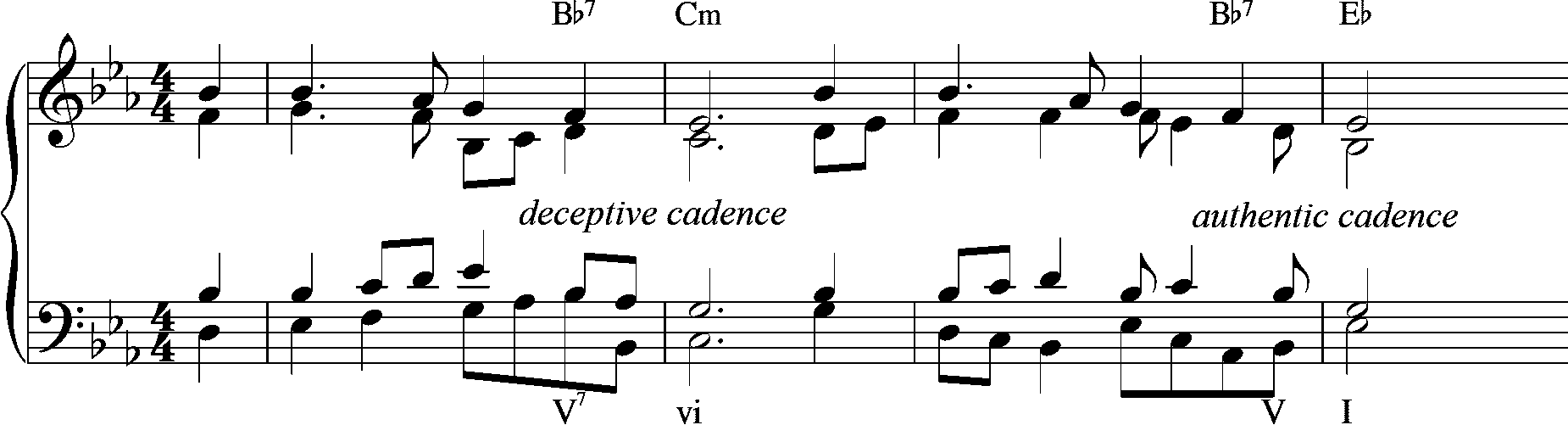
J.S. Bach, chorale "Wachet auf"

The exposition of the first movement of Beethoven's Piano Sonata No. 21, Op. 53 (Waldstein) features a minor-key passage where an authentic (perfect) cadence precedes a deceptive (interrupted) one:

Beethoven, Piano Sonata No. 21, 1st movement, bars 78–84

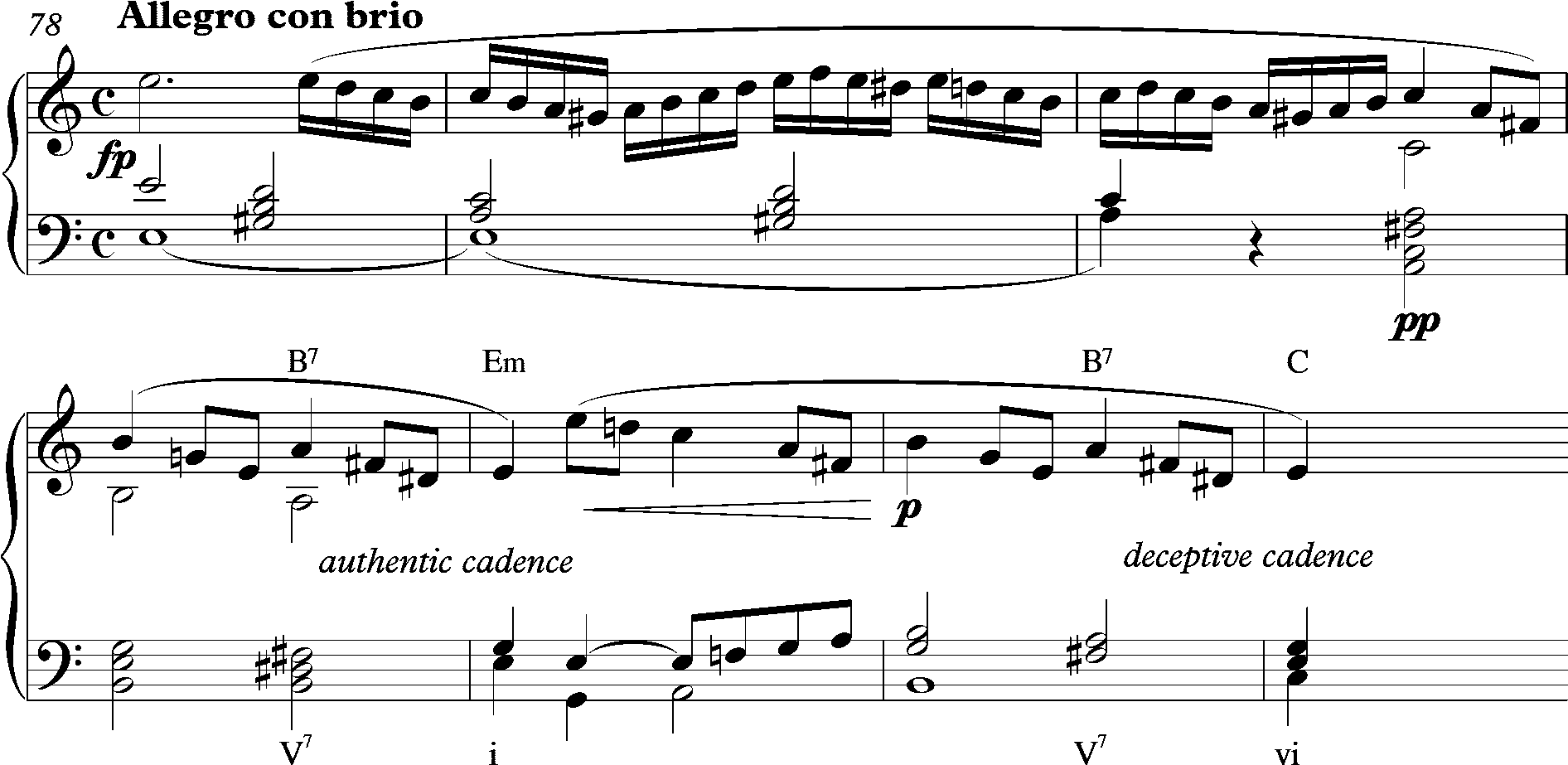
Beethoven, Piano Sonata No. 21, 1st movement, bars 78–84

Dvořák's Slavonic Dances, Op. 72, No. 2 features deceptive (interrupted), half (imperfect) and authentic (perfect) cadences within its first sixteen bars:

Dvořák, Slavonic Dances, Op. 72, No. 2

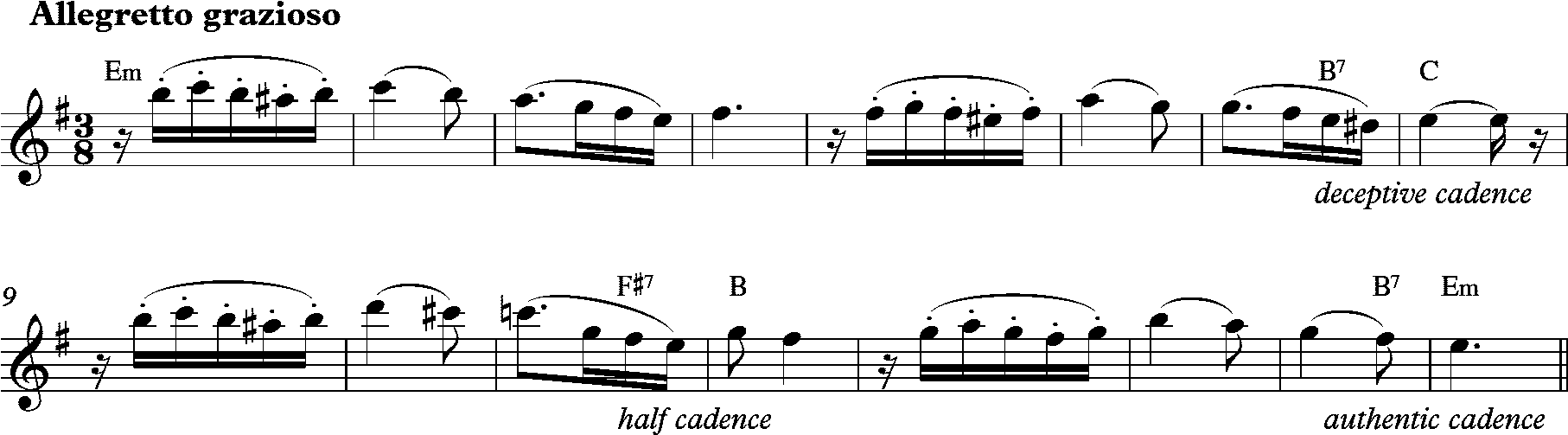
Dvořák, Slavonic Dances, Op. 72, No. 2

Debussy's piano prelude La fille aux cheveux de lin (see also above) concludes with a passage featuring a deceptive (interrupted) cadence that progresses, not from V–VI, but from V–IV:

Debussy, La fille aux cheveux de lin, bars 26–29

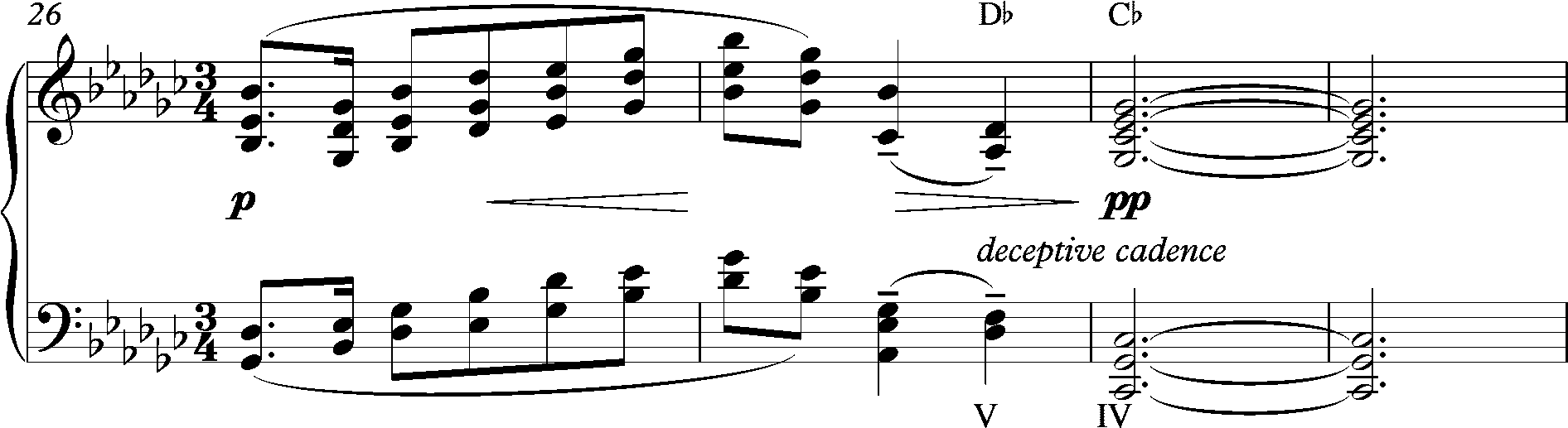
Debussy, La fille aux cheveux de lin, bars 26–29

Some varieties of deceptive cadence that go beyond the usual V–VI pattern lead to some startling effects. For example, a particularly dramatic and abrupt deceptive cadence occurs in the second Presto movement of Beethoven's Piano Sonata No. 30, Op. 109, bars 97–112, "a striking passage that used to pre-occupy theorists". The music at this point is in B minor, and carries the expectation is that the chord of F sharp (Chord V) will be followed by the tonic chord of B. However, "Dynamics become softer and softer; dominant and tonic chords of B minor appear isolated on the first beat of a bar, separated by silences: until in sudden fortissimo ... the recapitulation bursts on us in the tonic E minor, the B minor dominants left unresolved."

Beethoven, Piano Sonata No. 30, Op. 109, 2nd movement, bars 97–112

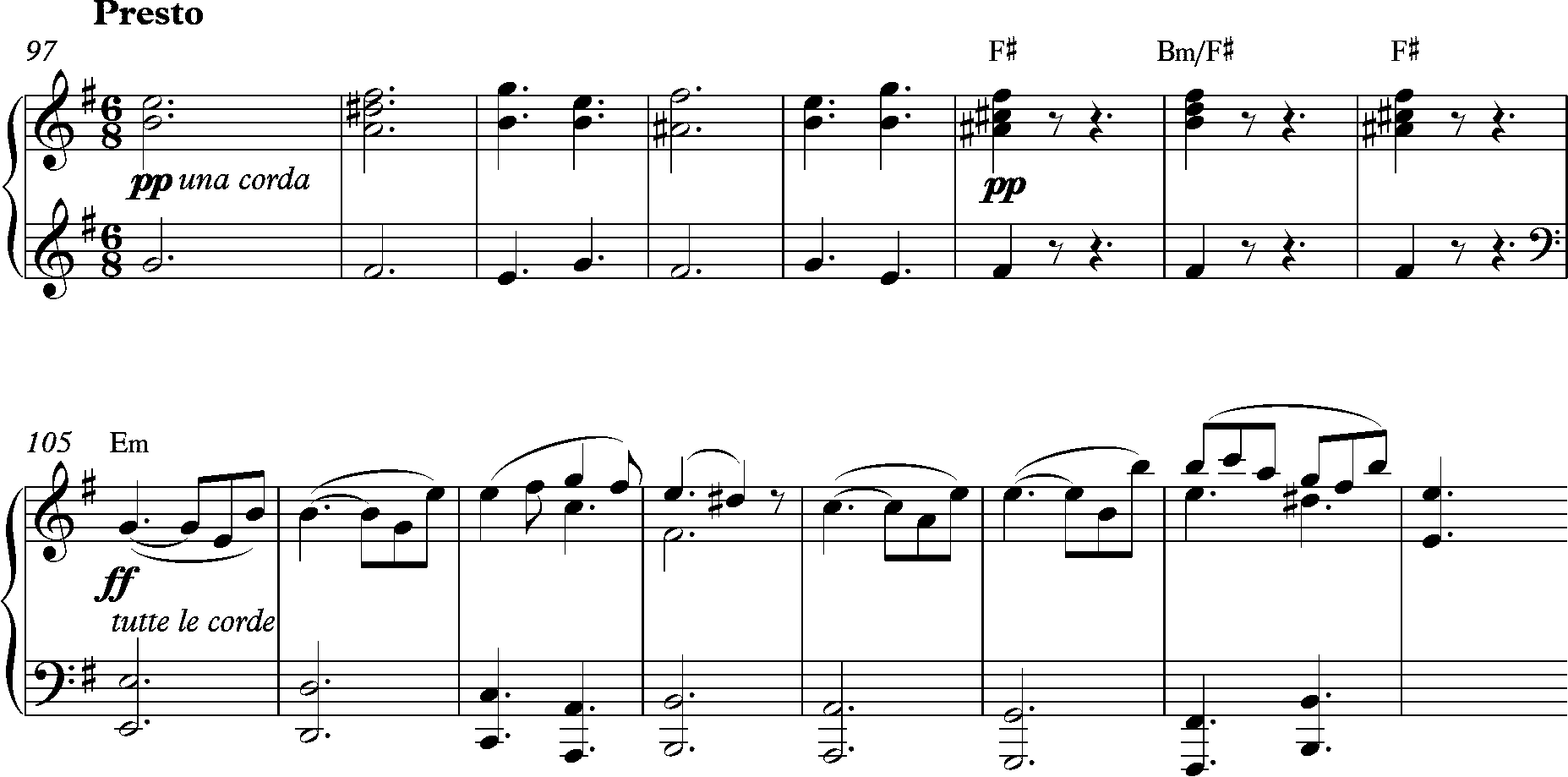
Beethoven, Piano Sonata No. 30, Op. 109, 2nd movement, bars 97–112.

An equally startling example occurs in J.S. Bach's Toccata and Fugue in F major, BWV 540:

J.S. Bach, Toccata in F, BWV 540, bars 197–207

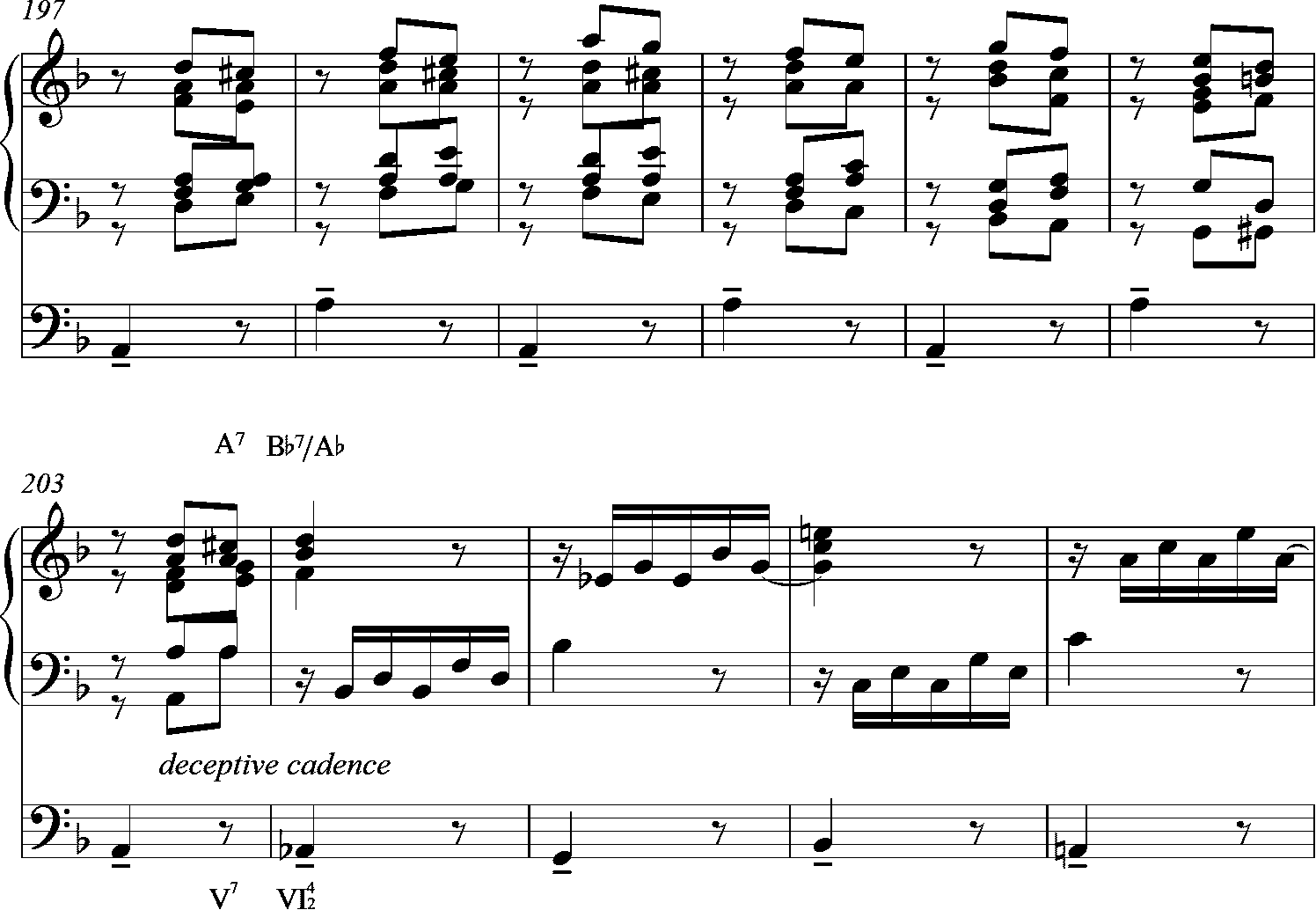
J.S. Bach, Toccata in F, BWV 540, bars 197–207

According to Richard Taruskin, in this Toccata, "the already much-delayed resolution is thwarted (m204) by what was the most spectacular 'deceptive cadence' anyone had composed as of the second decade of the eighteenth century ... producing an especially pungent effect." Hermann Keller describes the effect of this cadence as follows: "the splendour of the end with the famous third inversion of the seventh chord, who would not be enthralled by that?"

Chopin's Fantaisie, Op. 49, composed over a century later in 1841, features a similar harmonic jolt:

Chopin, Fantaisie, Op. 49

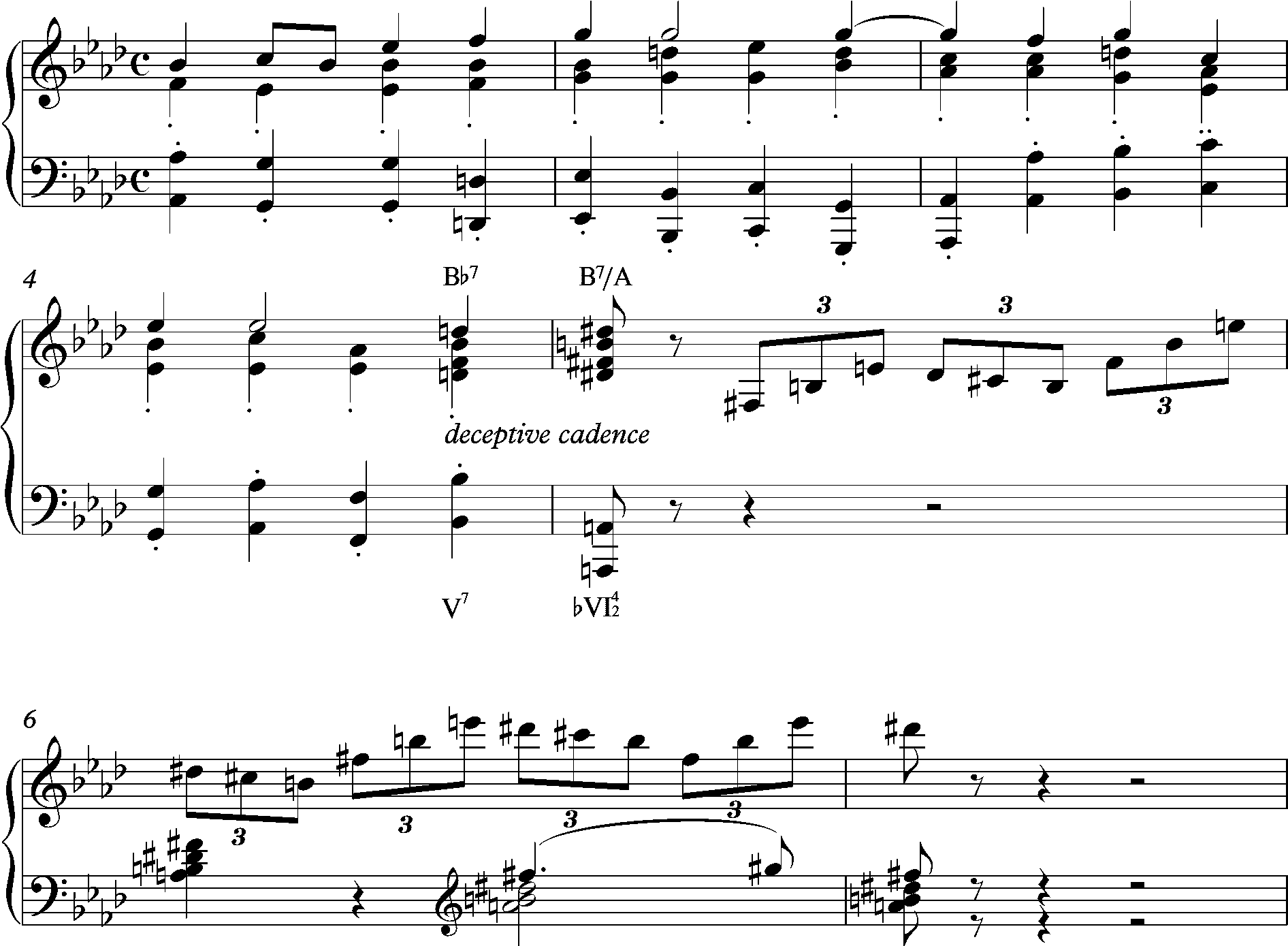
Chopin, Fantaisie, Op. 49

A deceptive cadence is a useful means for extending a musical narrative. In the closing passage of J.S. Bach's Prelude in F minor from Book II of The Well-Tempered Clavier, the opening theme returns and seems headed towards a possible final resolution on an authentic (perfect) cadence. What the listener may expect is:

J.S. Bach, Prelude in F minor, bars 57–60 with expected conclusion

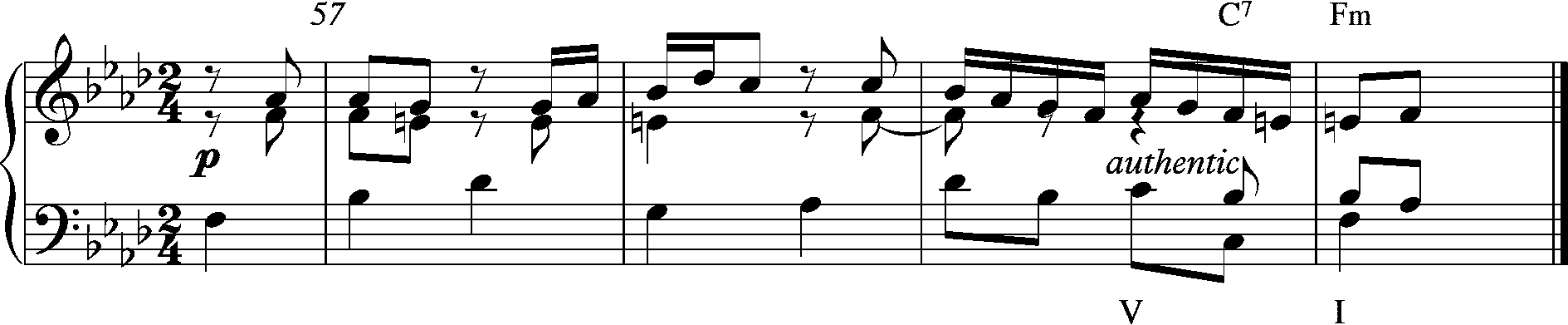
J.S. Bach, Prelude in F minor, bars 57–60 with expected conclusion

Instead, at bar 60, Bach inserts a deceptive cadence (V–VI in F minor), leading to a lengthy digression of some dozen bars before reaching resolution on the final (V–I) cadence.

J.S. Bach, Prelude in F minor, bars 57–70

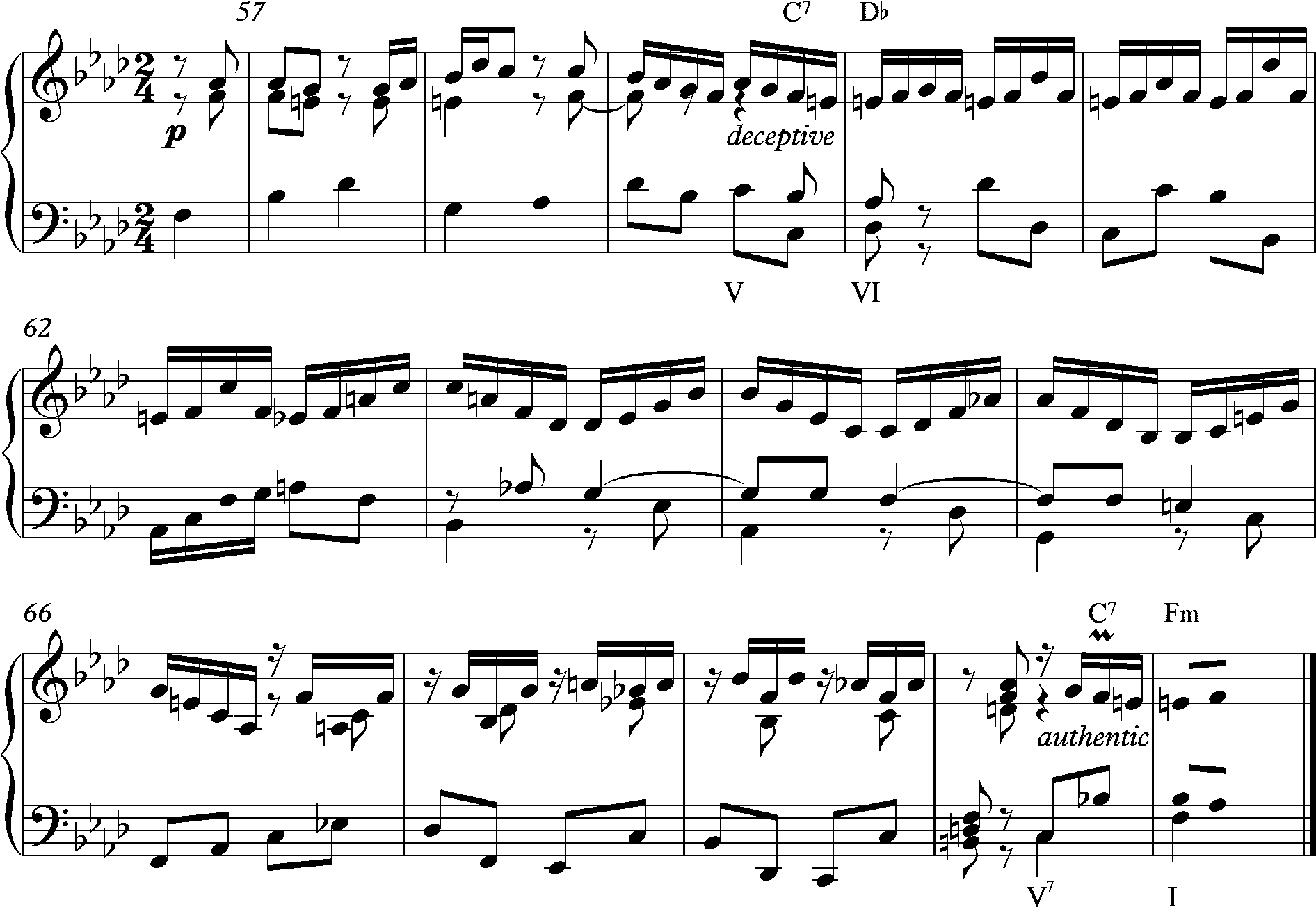
J.S. Bach, Prelude in F minor, bars 57–70

A similar passage occurs at the conclusion of Mozart's Fantasia in D minor, K. 397:

Mozart, Fantasia in D minor, K. 397, closing bars

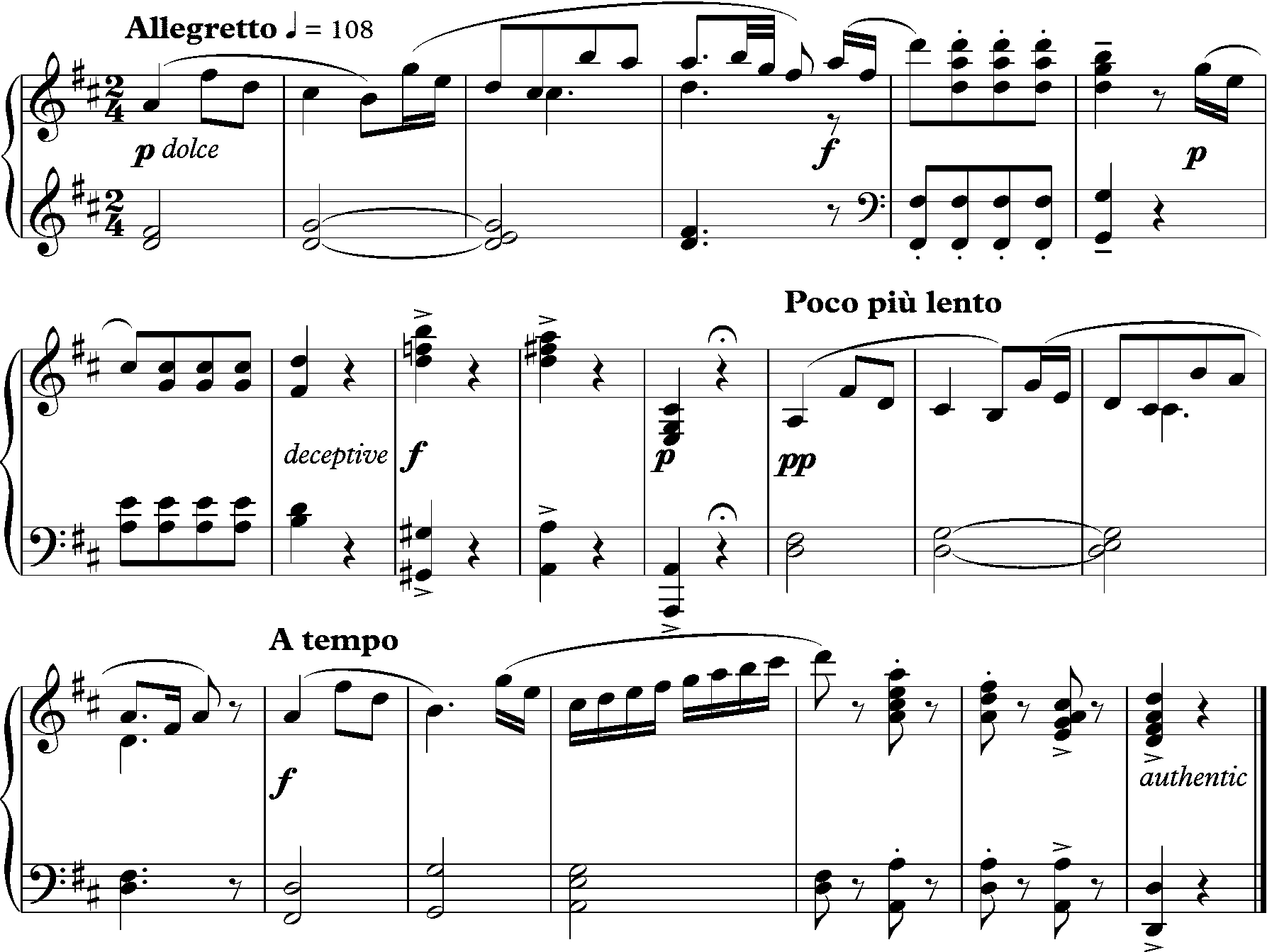
Mozart, Fantasia in D minor, K. 397, closing bars

== Jazz ==
Cadences in jazz are usually simply called cadences, as in common practice harmony. However, a certain category of cadence is referred to as a turnaround (originally called a "turnback" which is more accurate); this is when a cadence functions as a return to an already existing part of a song form such as AABA. In an AABA form, there are two turnbacks: at the end of the first A (A1) in order to repeat it (A2), and at the end of the B section in order to play the A a third time (A3). (The transition from the second A to the B is not a turnback, because the B section is being heard for the first time.)

Half-step cadences are common in jazz if not cliché. For example, the ascending diminished seventh chord half-step cadence, which—using a secondary diminished seventh chord—creates momentum between two chords a major second apart (with the diminished seventh in between).

The descending diminished seventh chord half-step cadence is assisted by two common tones.

== Rhythmic cadence ==
Cadences often include (and may be emphasized or signalled by) a change in the prevailing rhythmic pattern; in such cases the final note of the cadence usually takes more time (a longer note value, or followed by a rest, or both), and within a piece of music the cadences may also share a rhythmic pattern that is characteristic of the cadences in that piece. This method of ending a phrase with some distinctive rhythmic pattern has been called a "rhythmic cadence"; rhythmic cadences continue to function without harmony or melody, for example at the ends of phrases in music for drums. Some styles of music rely on frequent regular rhythmic cadences as a unifying feature of that style. The example below shows a characteristic rhythmic cadence (i.e. many of the cadences in this piece share this rhythmic pattern) at the end of the first phrase (in particular the last two notes and the following rest, contrasted with the regular pattern set up by all the notes before them) of J.S. Bach's Brandenburg Concerto No. 3 in G major, BMV 1048, mvmt. I, mm. 1–2:

== See also ==
- Andalusian cadence
- Approach chord
- Cadential six-four
- Coda
- Cadenza
- Drum cadence
- Kadans
- Lament bass
- List of Caribbean music genres: cadence-lypso and cadence rampa
- V–IV–I turnaround
- ♭VII–V^{7} cadence
