= Joseph Wheeler (musicologist) =

British musicologist

Joseph Hugh Wheeler (1927 – 11 October 1977) was a British musician and musicologist.

A civil servant by profession, Wheeler's most famous work was his realisation of Gustav Mahler's Tenth Symphony which he began in 1952 and took him some thirteen years to complete.

Wheeler was born in Bromley, England, the son of a professional brass band player. Wheeler had similar musical abilities, becoming a founder member of the Guild of Gentlemen Trumpeters. After completing his National Service with the RAF in 1948, Wheeler's consuming interest in Mahler and the championing of the unfinished Tenth by fellow enthusiast Jack Diether in the United States led him to begin work on the score, unaware that another musicologist, Deryck Cooke, was tackling the same project.

Although Cooke's performing version is by far the most familiar, many (including fellow 'completer' Remo Mazzetti Jr.) regard Wheeler's version as closest in texture to the more leanly orchestrated works Mahler was composing towards the end of his life. Unsurprisingly in Wheeler's version the brass features more heavily than in any other realisation. However what cannot be doubted is that Wheeler's is the least speculative of all versions and hence can be regarded as a snapshot of a work-in-progress rather than an attempt at a 'completion'.

Wheeler's caution led him to complete two working versions of the score, neither of which saw the light of day in performance. On 26 May 1965 Arthur Bloom premiered the first completed version of Wheeler's work with the Caecilian Symphony Orchestra. This was the third version, which he had completed in 1955. Wheeler made further changes to his work, and his final, fourth complete score was performed in New York City by Jonel Perlea with the Manhattan School of Music Orchestra in November 1966.

Wheeler's fourth revision is the basis of American conductor Robert Olson's edition, in which he corrected and deciphered some of the inconsistencies in Wheeler's manuscript.

Olson has since recorded Wheeler's version twice: with the Colorado MahlerFest Orchestra and again with the Polish National Radio Symphony Orchestra.
