= Curse of the ninth =

Superstition regarding classical music

The curse of the ninth is a superstition in classical music that the ninth symphony is destined to be a composer's last, and that the composer is fated to die before completing a tenth. It is associated with composers including Beethoven, Schubert, Bruckner, Dvorak and Mahler.

== History ==
The curse of the ninth superstition originated in the late-Romantic period of classical music. According to Arnold Schoenberg, the superstition began with Gustav Mahler, who, after writing his Eighth Symphony, wrote Das Lied von der Erde, which, while structurally a symphony, was able to be disguised as a song cycle, each movement being a setting of a poem for soloist and orchestra. Then he wrote his Ninth Symphony and thought he had beaten the curse, but died with his Tenth Symphony incomplete.

This superstition, however, was only hatched by Mahler. Before him, Beethoven and Schubert had died before or while writing their tenth symphonies. Upon realizing this, Mahler created the curse of the ninth and led this superstition into popularity by seemingly proving it true. This superstition has, however, lost popularity, and while it is spoken about, any possible "proof" of it has not happened recently as it did in the era of Beethoven and Mahler. As Maddy Shaw Roberts writes, "The Curse of the Nine is a great story, and it probably fueled a lot of the angst behind Mahler's heart-wrenching symphonies. But perhaps it's best to treat it as a superstition."

After Beethoven, Schubert, and Mahler, some composers cited as examples of the curse include:

- Malcolm Arnold
- Kurt Atterberg
- Anton Bruckner (he completed 10 symphonies, but "Study Symphony" and "Symphony No.0" are not counted)
- Antonín Dvořák (only 5 of his symphonies were known during his lifetime)
- Alexander Glazunov
- David Maslanka
- Vincent Persichetti
- Einojuhani Rautavaara
- Luis Humberto Salgado
- Alfred Schnittke
- Roger Sessions
- Ralph Vaughan Williams
- Boris Tishchenko

In contrast, there are numerous composers who completed ten or more symphonies.

- Havergal Brian
- David Diamond
- Roy Harris
- Joseph Haydn
- Vagn Holmboe
- Alan Hovhaness
- Rued Langgaard
- Darius Milhaud
- Wolfgang Amadeus Mozart
- Nikolai Myaskovsky
- Andrzej Panufnik
- Allan Pettersson
- Joachim Raff
- Edmund Rubbra
- William Schuman
- Dmitri Shostakovich
- Robert Simpson
- Emil Tabakov
- Heitor Villa-Lobos
- Mieczyslaw Weinberg

In 2012, composer Philip Glass stated, "Everyone is afraid to do a ninth. It is a jinx that people think about".

== In popular culture ==
The curse of the ninth symphony was addressed in the sixth episode of the 19th season of the British crime series Midsomer Murders in 2018 and in the fifth episode of the ninth series of the British anthology series Inside No. 9, "Curse of the Ninth" (2024).

== See also ==
- 27 Club
- The Scottish Play
- Sweater curse
- Symphony No. 10 – for counterexamples.
