= Yoel Gamzou =

Israeli-American conductor and composer

- יואל גמזו
- Born: 10 March 1988 (age 37); Tel Aviv, Israel
- Occupations: Conductor; Composer
- Organizations: International Mahler Orchestra; Staatstheater Kassel; Theater Bremen
- Awards: ECHO Klassik
- Website: www.yoelgamzou.com

Yoel Gamzou (Hebrew: יואל גמזו; 10 March 1988) is an Israeli-American conductor and composer, known for works by Gustav Mahler, especially his completion of Mahler's Symphony No. 10. He has been music director at the Theater Bremen from 2017, and has conducted at major European opera houses.

== Life and career ==
Born in Tel Aviv, Gamzou grew up in a family of musicians. He learned cello as a boy, and was exposed to music by Gustav Mahler, which inspired him at age 12 to pursue being a conductor. He completed schooling at age 14. At age 15, he moved to New York City to study. He tried regular studies also in Paris and London, but failed. He studied privately in Italy as the last student of Carlo Maria Giulini.

Gamzou founded his own orchestra in 2006, the International Mahler Orchestra (IMO), of players from 25 countries. In 2010, 100 years after completion of its draft, he finished his version of a playable score of Mahler's Symphony No. 10, which was published by Schott Music. It was premiered in Berlin on 5 September 2010, with Gamzou conducting the IMO. The performance, the conclusion of the Jüdische Kulturtage (Jewish Culture Days) at the Synagoge Rykestraße, received praise from reviewers and the audience. From 2010, Gamzou was chief conductor of the Neue Philharmonie München. From 2012 to 2015, he was First Kapellmeister of the Staatsorchester Kassel, conducting operas at the Staatstheater Kassel including Beethoven's Fidelio, Rossini's Il Barbiere di Siviglia, Verdi's Rigoletto and Puccini's Tosca. In 2017, he became music director at Theater Bremen, conducting Shostakovich's Lady Macbeth of the Mzensk District. He conducted there in 2019 Korngold's Die tote Stadt, and was credited with a successful revival of the music by his fervent and passionate dedication "(mit seinem glutvollen und leidenschaftlichen Einsatz)". He conducted the opera also at the Bavarian State Opera in 2021, with Elena Guseva and Klaus Florian Vogt in the leading roles, and at the Vienna State Opera in 2022.

He conducted orchestras including the Israel Philharmonic Orchestra, Bamberger Symphoniker, Deutsche Radio Philharmonie Saarbrücken Kaiserslautern, Symphoniker Hamburg and the Stuttgarter Philharmoniker. He was awarded the ECHO Klassik for young conductors in 2017.

== Awards ==
- 2007 Special prize of the Bamberger Symphoniker's Gustav Mahler conducting competition
- 2012 Berenberg Kulturpreis Hamburg
- 2013 Princess Margriet Award of the European Cultural Foundation
- 2017 ECHO Klassik in the category Nachwuchskünstler (Dirigat) for the recording of Mahler's Tenth Symphony
