= Barry Cooper (musicologist) =

English scholar and composer

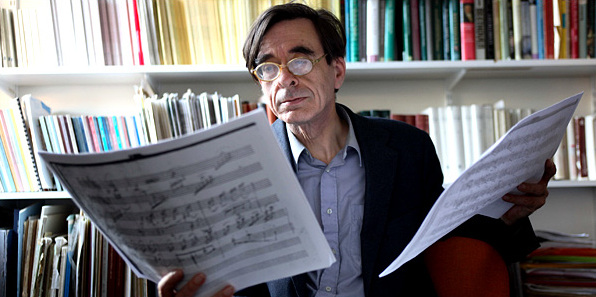
Barry Cooper, 2008

Barry Cooper (born 1949) is an English musicologist, composer, organist, Beethoven scholar, and editor of the Beethoven Compendium.

== Life ==
Born in Westcliff-on-Sea in Essex, Cooper studied piano and composition in his childhood, leading to scholarships at Gordonstoun School and later to University College, Oxford, where he studied organ with John Webster and earned an MA in 1973 and a DPhil in 1974. His musical compositions include an oratorio, The Ascension.

Cooper is best known for his books on Beethoven, as well as a completion and realization of Beethoven's fragmentary Symphony No. 10. Having extensively studied Beethoven's sketchbooks and written a book about them, Beethoven and the Creative Process, Cooper felt confident enough to identify the sketches for the individual movements of the Symphony and put together those for the first movement into a musically satisfactory whole. The realisation was recorded by the London Symphony Orchestra conducted by Wyn Morris. It was then revised and received its public premiere in 1988 by the Royal Liverpool Philharmonic Orchestra, conducted by Walter Weller. In a way, this fulfilled Beethoven's promise of his Symphony No. 10 to the Royal Philharmonic Society, since the premiere was at a concert given by this society. Several recordings are available.

From 1974–1990, Cooper taught at the University of Aberdeen, where he became interested in early printed music in that city, as well as music theory in 18th-century England. He has also discovered rare 17th century French harpsichord music as well as one of the oldest canons now known.

Cooper recently released a new edition of the Beethoven Piano Sonatas (for the ABRSM), incorporating three additional sonatas not normally included. Cooper also wrote the accompanying critical text to the sonatas, detailing the changes made and the many thousands of corrections to the sonatas.

Since 1990, Cooper has taught, latterly as Professor of Music, at the University of Manchester. As well as Beethoven's sketches, Cooper teaches courses in Western music history, editing, bibliography skills, and harmony and counterpoint.
