= Symphony No. 10 (Glass) =

2012 symphony composed by Philip Glass

- by Philip Glass
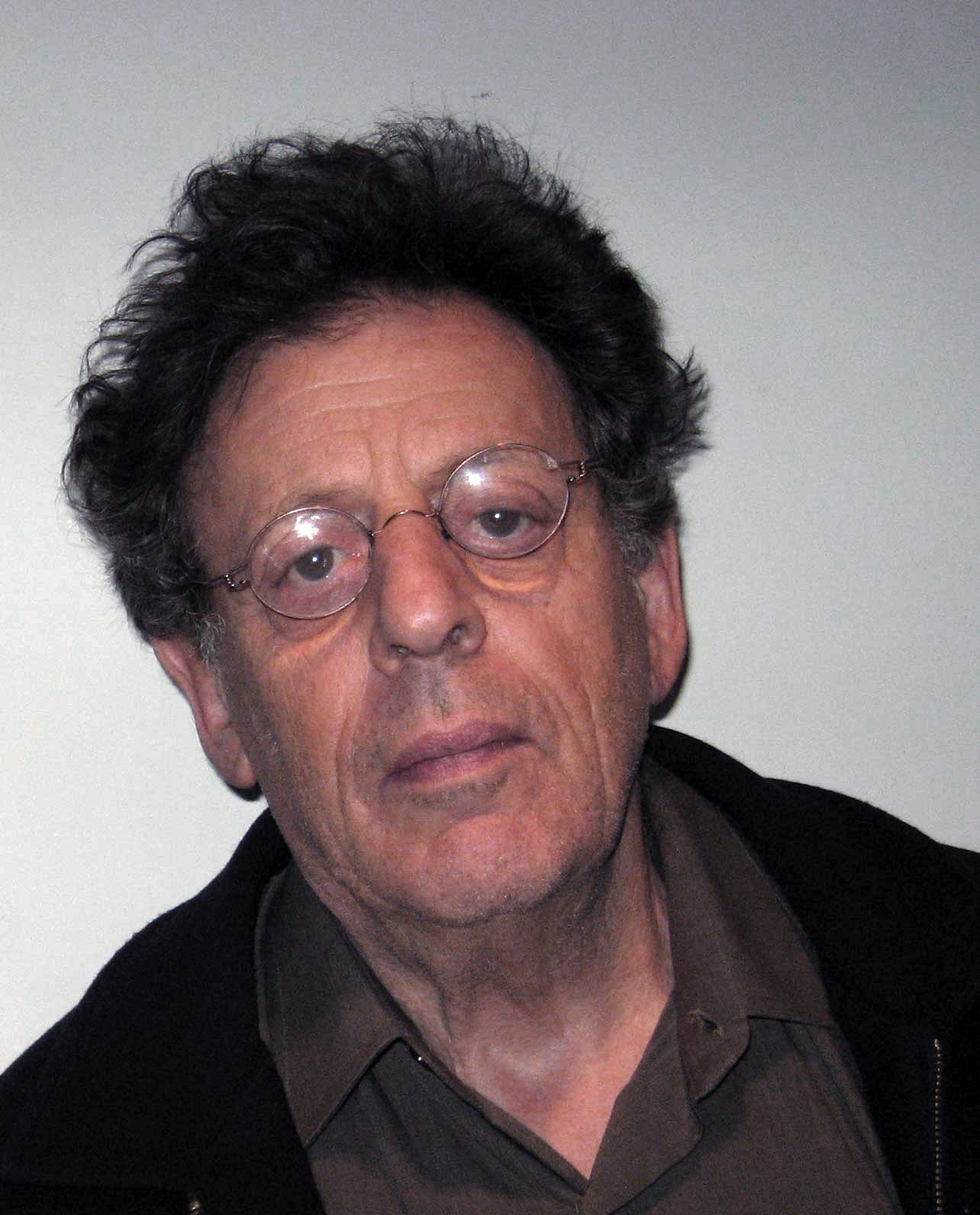
- Glass in 2007
- Period: Contemporary
- Style: Postmodern, minimalist
- Form: Symphony
- Composed: 2011–12
- Duration: 30 minutes

Premiere
- Date: August 9, 2012
- Location: Grand Théâtre de Provence in Aix-en-Provence, France
- Conductor: Dennis Russell Davies
- Performers: Orchestre Français des Jeunes

Symphony No. 10 is the tenth symphony by the American composer Philip Glass. The work was commissioned by the Orchestre Français des Jeunes and premiered August 9, 2012, with Dennis Russell Davies conducting the Orchestre Français des Jeunes at the Grand Théâtre de Provence in Aix-en-Provence. The piece had its United Kingdom premiere July 31, 2013 at The Proms in Royal Albert Hall.

== Composition ==
The symphony reworks music originally written as Los paisajes del rio for the Philip Glass Ensemble, premiered at the 2008 Expo Zaragoza. Due to the famed curse of the ninth, Glass composed the piece before the premiere of his Ninth Symphony.

=== Instrumentation ===
The work is scored for piccolo, two flutes, two oboes, three clarinets (second doubling on E♭ clarinet, third doubling on bass clarinet), two bassoons, four French horns, three trumpets, two trombones, bass trombone, tuba, timpani, six percussionists (chimes, glockenspiel, xylophone, marimbas, triangle, anvil, tamtam, clash cymbals, castanets, wood block, snare drum, tenor drum, bass drum), celesta, piano, harp, and strings (violins I & II, violas, violoncellos, and double basses).

== Reception ==
Reviewing the world premiere at the Grand Théâtre de Provence, Arabella Saer of the Financial Times lauded the symphony, writing:

There were enough typical Glass elements – repeated arpeggios, chugging chords, cross-rhythms and pared-down harmony – for the 35-minute piece to win no new converts. But there was also a cool, fresh energy about it, arising as much, perhaps, from the jeunesse of the players and the sleek, modern hall (only five years old), as from the fact that Glass must have had a youth orchestra – this youth orchestra – in mind when he wrote it.

Andrew Clements of The Guardian later opined, "Its extrovert origins as latter-day fireworks music remain clear, though, as Glass's orchestration, with its brassy edge and martial percussion – lots of snare drum – underlines in Davies's performance." Pwyll ap Siôn of Gramophone also gave the work moderate praise, writing:

The work opens and ends effectively enough with a darkly exuberant first and flamboyant fifth. Deprived of their extra-musical clothing, some of the other movements lack variety and substance, however. The slow second's gradually unfolding two-note melody is only enlivened by pulsing patterns in percussion and brass, while the third’s endless tonic-dominant oscillations and the fourth’s paradiddle patterns struggle to hold interest.
