= Prelude and Fugue in F minor, BWV 881 =

Keyboard composition by Johann Sebastian Bach

The Prelude and Fugue in F minor, BWV 881, is a keyboard composition written by Johann Sebastian Bach. It is the twelfth prelude and fugue in the second book of The Well-Tempered Clavier, a series of 48 preludes and fugues by the composer.

== Analysis ==
=== Prelude ===
The prelude is 70 bars long, and is written in binary form, of which the first half is 28 bars long and ends in A♭ major. The second half modulates through a variety of keys before returning to the home key of F minor. Below is the opening sentence of the prelude:

The first four measures of this sentence have two voices leading the melody in thirds, and another voice leading the bass line. After four measures, only two voices continue. One voice plays the root of a chord, while the second voice plays a broken chord around it. This continues like so for another four measures, and ends with an imperfect cadence. After this, the sentence is repeated, except modulating to E♭ major at one point and ending on a perfect cadence. Together, these two sentences create a compound period, and the first part of a small binary.

Following the compound period, the second part of the small binary starts. It consists of one voice playing broken chords and two other voices leading a melody, and is eight measures long. A perfect cadence in A♭ major concludes the small binary, and thus ending the theme of the prelude.

The prelude ends with a two-measure codetta, which consists of a perfect cadence in the home key.

=== Fugue ===
The fugue is 85 bars long, and is written for 3 voices. Below is the 4-measure subject of the fugue:

Just like most fugues in the baroque period, the subject is then repeated in the middle voice in the dominant key (C minor), and then repeated once more in the lowest voice, again in the home key. This final repetition of the subject is followed a small episode that consists of a descending fifths sequence. This is followed by the development of the fugue, which has many additional repetitions of the subject in various voices and keys, and occasionally episodes with the same descending fifths sequence as before in between. After the final repetition of the subject in the tonic key, the descending fifths episode is repeated as a codetta with a Picardy third, which concludes the fugue.

== See also ==
- List of compositions by Johann Sebastian Bach

== Sources ==
- Bach, Johann Sebastian. "Prelude and Fugue No. 12 in F Minor." The Well Tempered Clavier, Books 1 and 2. Ed. Saul Novak.

== Interactive media ==
- BWV 881 Fugue (Flash) - David Korevaar performing
- BWV 846-869 Prelude and Fugue (Flash) at the BinAural Collaborative Hypertext David Korevaar, Philip Goeth, and Edward Parmentier performing
