= Wyn Morris =

Welsh conductor (1929–2010)

- Born: 14 February 1929; Trellech, Monmouthshire, Wales
- Died: 23 February 2010 (aged 81); London, England
- Occupation: conductor

Wyn Morris (14 February 1929 – 23 February 2010) was a Welsh conductor.

== Biography ==
Morris was born in Trellech, Monmouthshire, Wales, the son of composer Haydn Morris (1891-1965). His musical education included spells at the Royal Academy of Music and the Salzburg Mozarteum where he was a pupil of Igor Markevitch.

He was especially acknowledged for his interpretations of Gustav Mahler's works, which he recorded almost complete during the 1960s and 1970s. He was the first to record Deryck Cooke's second performing version of Mahler's Symphony No. 10 in 1972, only the third time a recording of the work had been made. He also conducted the first recording of Barry Cooper's realisation of Ludwig van Beethoven's Symphony No. 10 in 1988.

Morris was music director of the Royal National Eisteddfod from 1960 to 1962, and the Huddersfield Choral Society from 1969 to 1972 He was responsible for the first British performance of Sergei Rachmaninoff's All-Night Vigil (often referred to as his Vespers).

He founded the Symphonica of London in 1965, with which he recorded several of the Mahler symphonies.

Morris could be somewhat abrasive in style, both with orchestras and administrators. In his obituaries he was described as variously "truculent" and "cantankerous", alienating even those who indulged his temperament for the sake of the artistic results. Others observed that he was essentially a maestro out of time; his wilful, demanding behaviour belonged to an era when conductors could command orchestras in such a manner, and hence ultimately found himself out of favour.
