= Lydian cadence =

Musical cadence popular in the 14th century

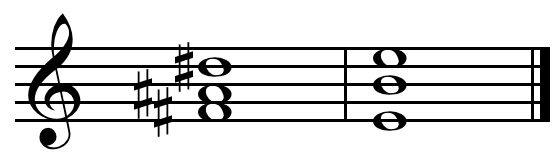
Lydian cadence (voice-leading) on E

A Lydian cadence is a type of half cadence that was popular in the Ars nova style of the 14th and early 15th century. It is so-called because it evokes the Lydian mode based on its final chord as a tonic, and may be construed with the chord symbols VII♯^{6}_{3}-I (if the final is taken as a Lydian-mode tonic) or III^{6}_{3}-IV (if the final is taken as a in major). It is also the most common type of double-leading-tone cadence, as it contains two leading-tone resolutions (♯- and -). A frequently used type of Landini cadence is based on the Lydian cadence, with the upper voice dropping to before skipping back up to the tonic.
