= Beethoven's compositional method =

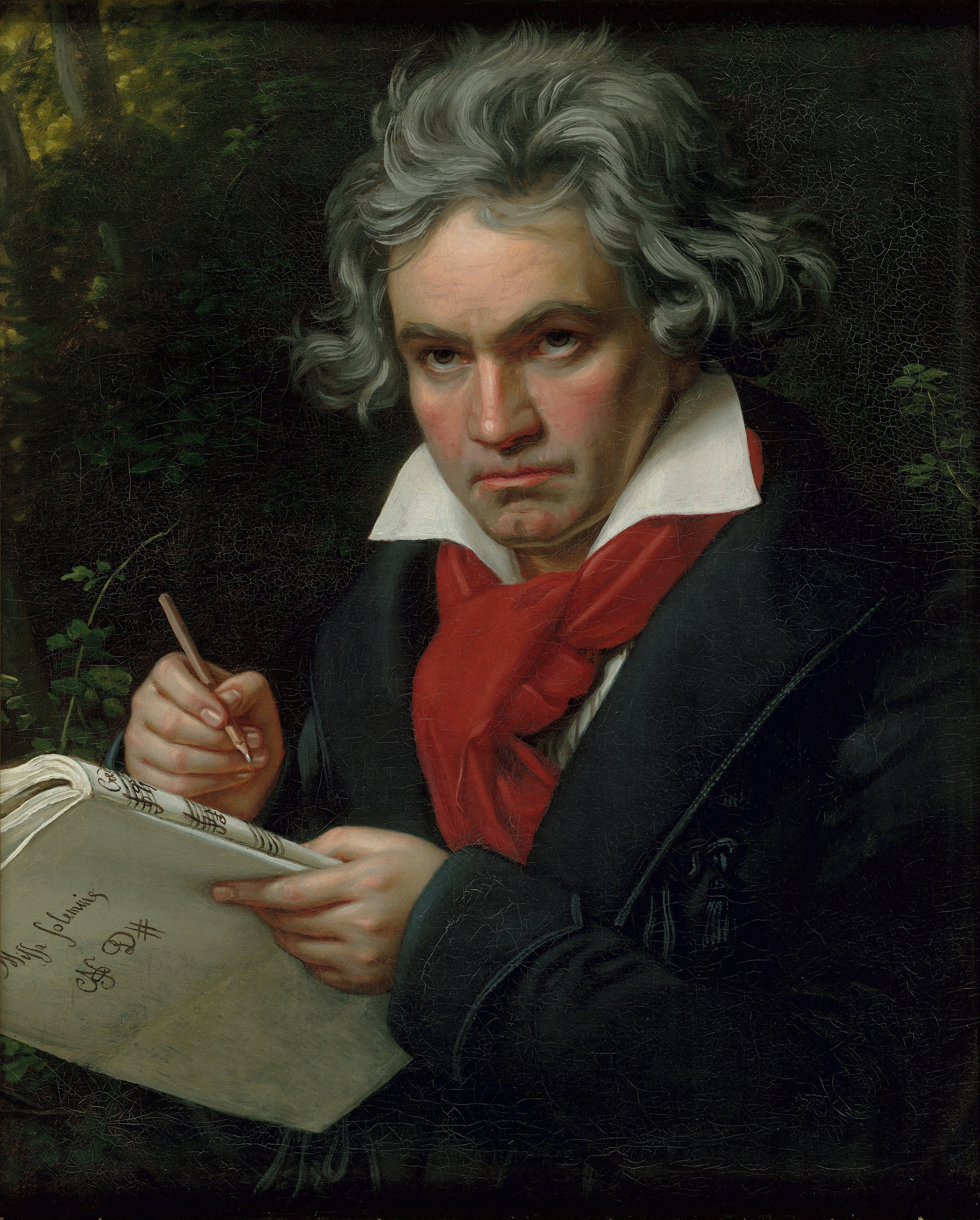
Beethoven's portrait by Joseph Karl Stieler, 1820

Ludwig van Beethoven (1770–1827) was a German composer in the transition between the classical and romantic period. He composed in many different genres including nine symphonies, five piano concertos, and a violin concerto. Beethoven's method of composition has long been debated among scholars. His sketches of composition drafts, and his written letters, provide contrasting evidence about his process of composition. However, many scholars agree that, for him, composition was a slow and laborious process. It is clear that his deafness impacted his compositional style, as evinced in certain changes in compositional method from early to late in his career.

== Beethoven's approach to composition ==
Composer Louis Schlösser visited Beethoven in 1822 and published his recollections in 1885. He asked Beethoven how he composes; Beethoven replied:

I carry my thoughts about me for a long time, sometimes a very long time, before I set them down ... I make many changes, reject and reattempt until I am satisfied ... I am conscious of what I want, the basic idea never leaves me. It rises, grows upward, and I hear and see the picture as a whole take shape and stand forth before me as though cast in a single piece, so that all is left is the work of writing it down.

== Process ==
Beethoven's process of composition changed over the course of his career. Many scholars divide his career into three main time periods; the early, middle, and late period. During the early period (ended in 1802) the driving force behind his compositions was his desire to master the Viennese style of composition. He was strongly inspired by Mozart and Haydn during this period, but he also wanted to create his own individual style and not merely emulate his predecessors. Towards the end of the early period (1800–1802), Beethoven began to become more innovative and experimental with his works. These works are now viewed as the transition into his middle period. During this period he composed very quickly, producing many works in a short time-frame.

The middle period is sometimes referred to by scholars as the "heroic" period. The start of this period is marked by the Eroica Symphony. This symphony includes Beethoven's trademark long development section. Building on the works of Haydn and Mozart, Beethoven would place great emphasis on the development section as he believed it was "the heart" of a composition. He was known for having long yet very structured development sections and this aspect of his style was evident during this period. During this period his technique of the "germ motive" was also evident. The germ motive is when an entire movement is based around ideas introduced in the first few bars. Beethoven's compositional process would then be to compose a bar and base the entirety of the piece around the motif in the first bar. The pieces in the middle period (1803–1812) have a much darker feel than the pieces in the first period. During this time, Beethoven was suffering from depression. It was also the start of his hearing loss. Although this was a dark period of Beethoven's life, common themes of heroism and perseverance are evident in his works.

The final period (1813–1827) consisted of Beethoven composing unconventional pieces. This period is sometimes considered to be "transcendent". During the beginning of this period Beethoven's composition halted due to personal issues. Towards the later years he maintained the influences of Mozart and Haydn, but also heavily renewed his works, operating an original merging of older styles, from the most strict and complex contrapuntal forms and procedures (fugues, canons and imitation) of Baroque composers such as Bach and Handel, to the church modes employed in the Medieval and Renaissance eras. Towards the end of his life, he was composing efficiently again and produced some of his most famous pieces.

== Deafness ==
Beethoven's compositional method was greatly impacted by his gradual loss of hearing. Scholars cannot agree on when he began to experience this impaired hearing, but it is said to have started around 1796/1797 (during the end of the early period). By the final period, he was completely deaf. His levels of deafness approximately correlate to the different periods of his compositions. Some scholars argue that his varying levels of hearing had a major impact on his style of composition. His deafness was first evident when he noticed he was unable to hear higher frequencies. Some scholars argue this impacted his compositions in the middle period which tend to use fewer higher pitches. When his hearing was only mildly impaired, he would use ear trumpets to compose at the piano. He would also use a wooden stick between his teeth to feel the vibrations when he played. The higher frequencies are present in his later works again. By this time he was completely deaf and he was only able to imagine the sound of the composition.

== Evidence of compositional method ==
=== Sketches ===
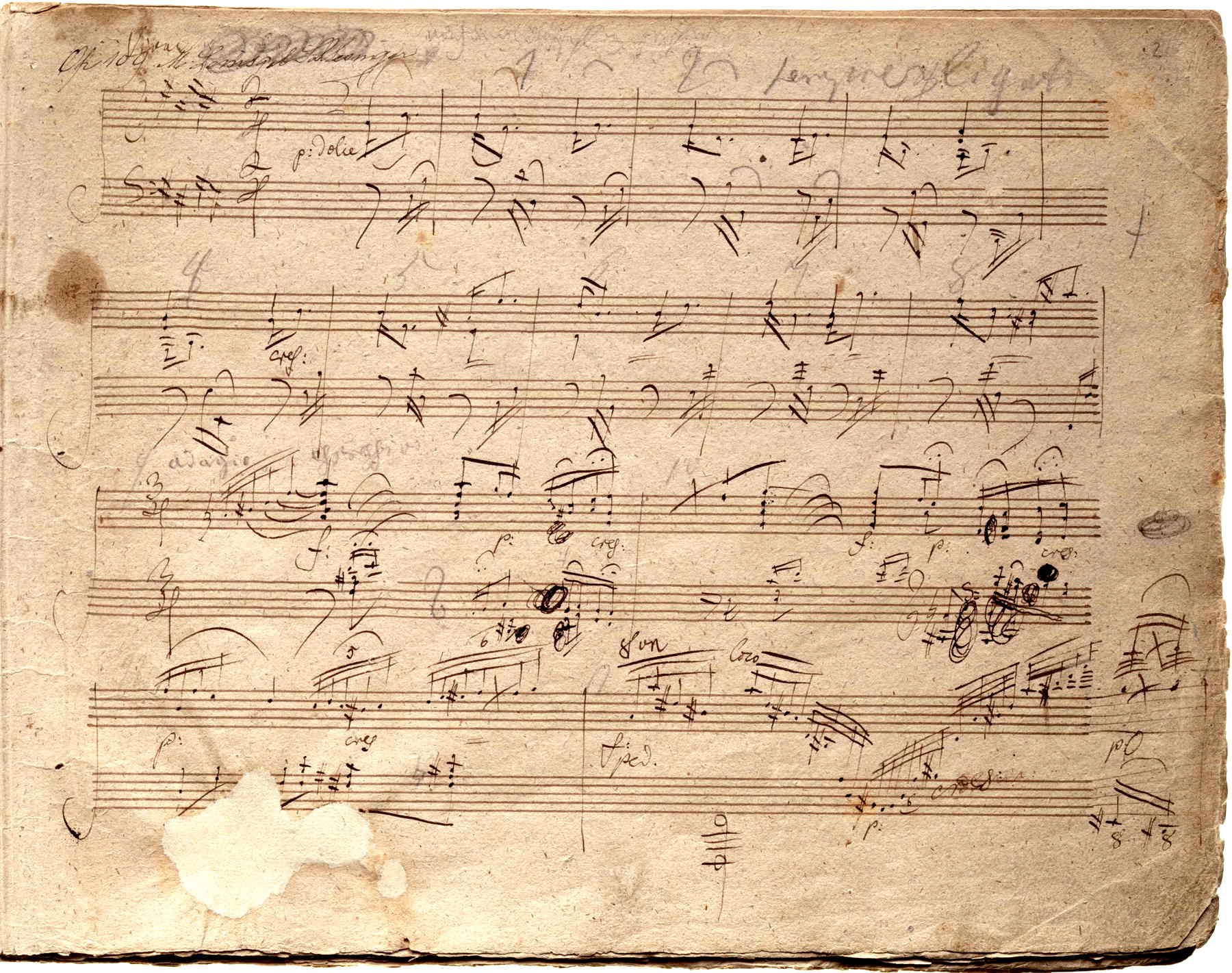
Beethoven's Piano Sonata No. 30 sketch

Beethoven's sketches give scholars an insight into his compositional process. The sketches do not dictate how audiences should interpret or experience the piece. However, they do reveal information about Beethoven himself and act more as a bibliographic aid rather than an analytical tool.

According to biographers, Beethoven's compositional process was undergone in two distinct phases. First, he would sketch the main thematic ideas and motifs. Once he had these sketched, he would compose the piece through what was considered by scholars to be a laborious and painstaking process.

Beethoven was known to make many drafts and corrections before finishing a composition. Unlike Mozart, who would often compose the entire piece before writing it down, Beethoven made many sketches with various edits at every stage. His conception of pieces was evidently a process of compiling fragments of musical ideas until they became a whole composition. The process is argued to have been a slow process and one that Beethoven wrestled with until the composition was completed. The sketches illustrate this process through providing evidence of his many drafts.

Many scholars have analysed his sketches as a means of understanding more about his compositions and their creation. Analysis of the sketches are not limited to analysis of the musical content but examination of every detail including handwriting style and ink. Analysis of ink colour and thickness in Beethoven's ‘Kafka’ notebook demonstrated three distinct periods of composition from the years 1798 to 1801 and 1800 to 1803.

==== Nottebohm ====
Gustav Nottebohm was a music scholar based in Vienna for most of his career. He is one of the first authorities in textual criticism of music. He is most famous for the work he did on Beethoven's sketches; he was one of the first scholars to study them. He was the first one to demonstrate how important the documents were in understanding Beethoven's compositional process. Nottebohm's access to Beethoven's drafts, sketches and notes as well as his published compositions enabled him to discover patterns in Beethoven's style of composition and gain an understanding of his process.

==== Kafka sketchbook ====
One of the most analysed documents of Beethoven's is the Kafka sketchbook. The sketchbook contains a variety of complete and incomplete compositions from the 1780s and 1790s. The Kafka sketchbook became very useful for scholars to get an insight into the conception of Beethoven's works.

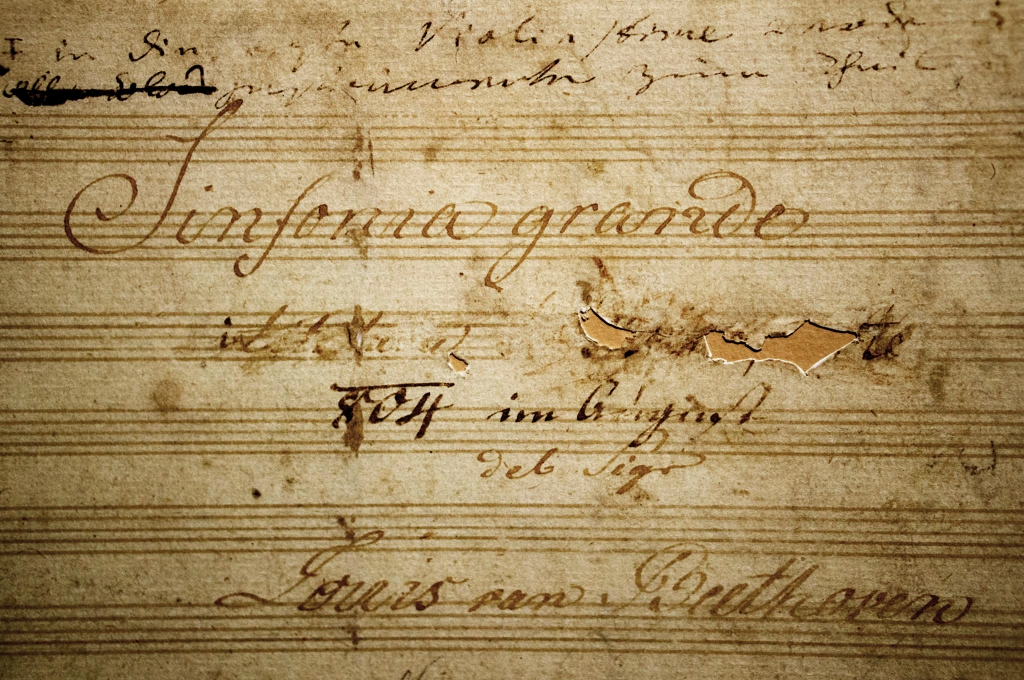
Original title page for Beethoven's Eroica Symphony

==== Eroica Symphony ====
The majority of the Eroica Symphony is transcribed in what scholars termed the Eroica sketchbook. The first task for academics after discovering the sketchbook was to attempt to sort all the drafts and sketches of compositions into chronological order. The ordering process would not simply apply to entire compositions but rather every individual notation that was marked on the page. One method of achieving this was by comparing how similar a draft is to the final publication. Scholars who used this method were working under the assumption that every edit to a composition made it more similar to the final product. This method does not account for the potential times when Beethoven returned to an original idea after previously altering it. Because of this, it became customary for scholars to focus their attention more on the way in which the notation was transcribed as opposed to what is actually written on the score. For example, a marking crowded between other notations might suggest to scholars that it was an afterthought. Through close examination of these sketches, scholars managed to sort the pieces into chronological order. This would then allow academics to begin to search for patterns in Beethoven's compositional method.

For decades scholars believed that all the surviving sketches and drafts for the Eroica Symphony were transcribed in the Eroica sketchbook. However, in 1962 the Wielhorsky sketchbook was found to also contain sketches from the Eroica Symphony. It was the sketchbook used before the Eroica sketchbook and was Beethoven's primary sketchbook from 1802 to 1803. The earliest drafts of this symphony were transcribed in this sketchbook. Nathan Fishman was the first scholar to reveal his transcriptions of the sketchbook. The sketches in the Wielhorsky sketchbook were intended as a loose outline for the Eroica Symphony containing some of the main themes and some plans for specific sections. The sketches suggest that the Eroica Symphony was constructed based on the material in the final movement so in a sense, was composed backward. The sketchbook also suggests that the symphony was not always intended to be as large as it ended up being. The Eroica Symphony diverged from the conventions of symphonies at the time in terms of its sheer magnitude. The Wielhorsky sketchbook suggests that the symphony was not composed around the idea of drifting from these norms but over time, across many drafts, it ended up achieving this.

==== Egerton MS 2795 ====
British Library Egerton MS 2795 was another sketchbook that Beethoven used to document his compositions which dates back to 1825. This notebook is 8 by 5 inches which was small enough to fit into most pockets during Beethoven's time. He was said to have carried this notebook around on his trips to the countryside. The compositions in the notebooks are written in pencil and are therefore difficult for scholars to interpret. His serious work was transcribed at home in a larger book in ink. Scholars have been able to confirm that the Egerton was used in conjunction with the large book.

==== Quartet in B-flat, Op. 130 ====
Beethoven's 13th string quartet, Quartet in B-flat, Op. 130, was transcribed in the Egerton notebook. However, drafts of this piece were also found in a larger 80-page book. The version in the book was significantly different from the final composition. One of the major differences was that the first movement was written in 3/4 time rather than 4/4 like what is heard in the published piece. This gives scholars an insight into how some of Beethoven's pieces were created.

==== Symphony No. 6 ====
Symphony No. 6 (Pastoral) in F major, Op. 68,1st movement excerpt
BBC Symphony Orchestra

The primary sketchbook for Beethoven's Symphony No. 6 (Pastoral) reveals that the first movement was most likely composed loosely from start to finish. The piece's physical order in the sketchbook matches its chronological order. The sketches also suggest that Beethoven struggled immensely with the retransition and the coda sections. The retransition section for example, has at least fourteen distinct drafts. This amount of drafts not only suggests to scholars that these sections troubled Beethoven, but it also allows scholars to track the changes made and draw conclusions as to why they were made. The sketches show how Beethoven was struggling to decide whether a particular sequence should resolve to the tonic for a powerful resolution or move to the sub-dominant for a less impactful tonic arrival. The sketches suggest that Beethoven wrote both endings to the section, compared them, and then chose what he felt was the right resolution.

=== Letters ===
Beethoven's letters also provide insight on his compositional process. Scholars analysed a letter written by Beethoven in 1802 addressed to a woman who had asked him to compose a sonata for her. She had requested a specific tonal plan and structure. He replied that he would compose a sonata in following with her general plan but that he would decide the tonal scheme. This suggests to scholars that Beethoven was able to compose to a request to a certain extent. He also wrote in a letter from 1814 stating that he always composes with the whole piece in mind. He wrote a similar sentiment in another letter; he conveyed that he only transcribes his compositions once he has fully realised them in his head. This, however, contrasts with the compositional process suggested by his sketches. Scholars overcame this contradiction by reasoning that Beethoven's letters would be more biased than the sketches as they convey his own subjective perception of his compositional habits.

== See also ==
- Beethoven's musical style
- List of compositions by Ludwig van Beethoven
