= Jack Diether =

Jack Diether (1919–1987) was a Canadian-born American music critic and musicologist prominent in the 1960s and 70s. He was best known for his expertise in and promotion of the music of Gustav Mahler and Anton Bruckner at a time when neither composer enjoyed wide critical acceptance.

It was Diether who in 1943 attempted unsuccessfully (by letter) to interest Dmitri Shostakovich in the task of producing a performable score from the draft of Mahler's unfinished Tenth Symphony; he was also present at a 1949 meeting between Alma Mahler and Arnold Schoenberg at which the latter declined to take on the same task.

The final issue of the journal Chord and Discord was dedicated to his memory.

The Jack Diether papers, dating from 1941 to 2006, are now held by the New York Public Library.

== Articles by Diether ==
- 'Mahler And Atonality', Music Review, Vol. 17, 1956, pp. 130–133
- 'Richard III: The Preservation Of A Film', The Quarterly of Film, Radio and Television, Vol. 11, Issue 3, 1957, pp. 280–293
- 'Mahler and Psychoanalysis', Psychoanalysis and the Psychoanalytic Review, Winter, 1958-9
- 'Mahler's Place in Musical History', Chord and Discord, Vol. 2, No. 10, 1963
- 'The Expressive Content of Mahler's Ninth Symphony: An Interpretation', Chord and Discord, Vol. 2, No. 10, 1963
- 'Music Since The LP', Musical America, Vol. 84, 1964, pp. 8–9
- 'Finishing Mahler's "Unfinished"', Music and Musicians, May 1966, pp. 9–10
