= Symphony No. 10 (Beethoven/Cooper) =

Hypothetical work first performed in 1988

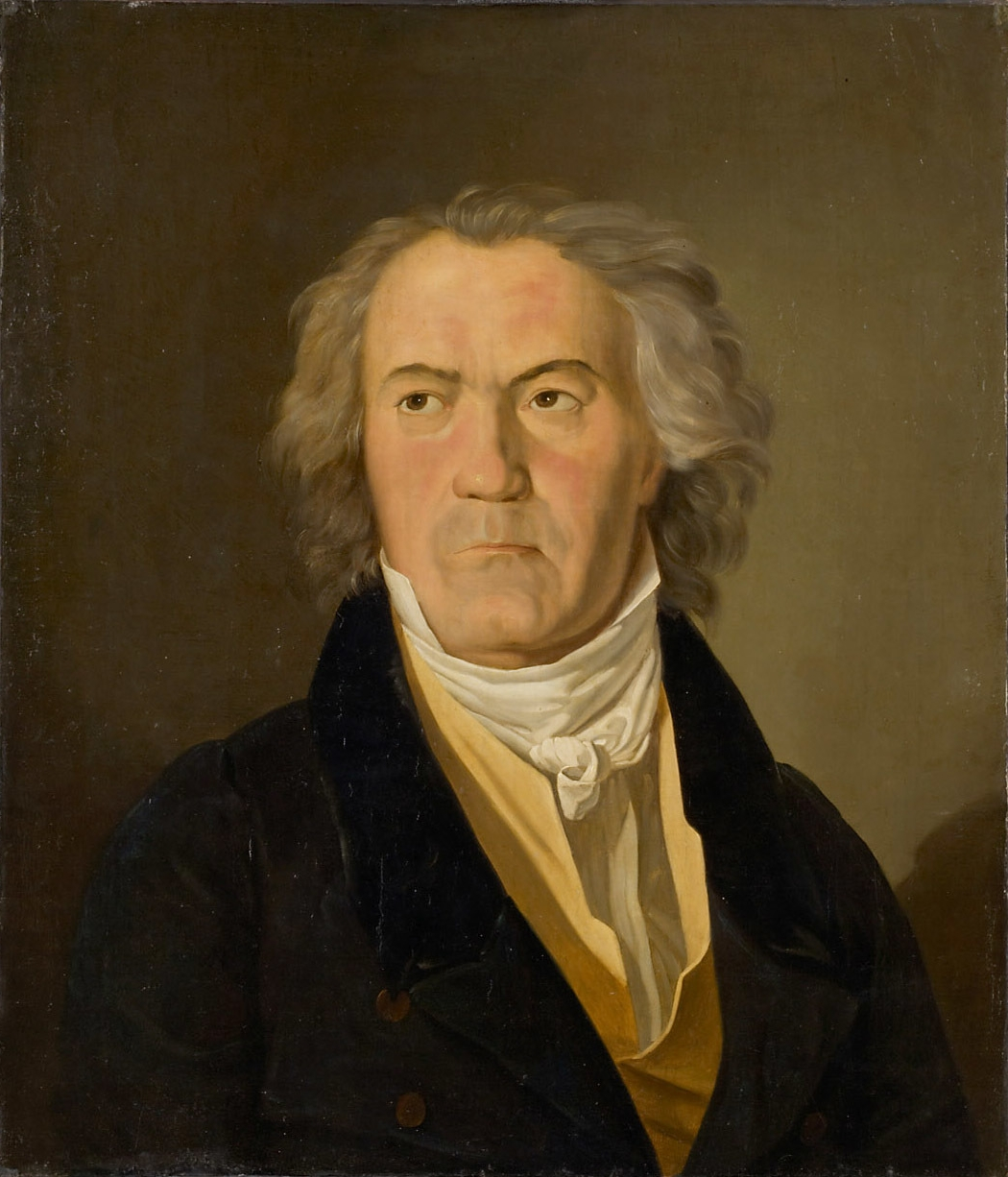
Beethoven (age 52) by Ferdinand Georg Waldmüller (1823)

Ludwig van Beethoven's Symphony No. 10 in E♭ major is a hypothetical work, assembled in 1988 by Barry Cooper from Beethoven's fragmentary sketches for the first movement. All the sketches assembled were clearly intended for the same symphony, which would have followed the Ninth, since they appear together in several small groups, and there is consensus that Beethoven did intend to compose another symphony. Cooper's score was first performed at a concert given in 1988 by the Royal Philharmonic Society, London, to whom Beethoven himself had offered the new symphony in 1827. The score is published by Universal Edition, Vienna, and appeared in a new edition in 2013.

== Background ==
After completing the Ninth Symphony in 1824, Beethoven devoted his energies largely to composing his late string quartets, although there are contemporary references to some work on a symphony (e.g. in his letter of 18 March 1827); allegedly he played a movement of this piece on the piano for his friend Karl Holz, whose description of what he heard matches the sketches identified by Cooper. Cooper claimed that he found over 250 measures of sketches for the first movement, which he wove together to form the first movement, keeping as close as he could to Beethoven's compositional method and sketching processes. Cooper's reconstruction of the first movement consists of an Andante in E♭ major enclosing a central Allegro in C minor. Cooper claimed to have also found sketches for a Scherzo which he used as a third movement and other later movements, but he deemed them not extensive or developed enough to be assembled into a performing version.

It's important to note that when Beethoven had written out these initial sketches, some were written alongside some for the 9th symphony, and were clearly intended for a different work. Although his initial sketches suggest another symphony, it remained unfinished until his death in 1827.

There are a few references to this work in Beethoven's correspondence. (Note: Beethoven had originally planned the Ninth Symphony to be entirely instrumental, the Ode to Joy to be a separate cantata, and the Tenth Symphony to conclude with a different vocal work.)

== Recordings ==
Two recordings of Cooper's reconstruction of the first movement of the symphony were released in 1988, one conducted by Wyn Morris and the other by Walter Weller. The Morris recording was also released in 1988 on a disc that included the music and an audio recording of a lecture titled "The story of Beethoven's tenth symphony", by Barry Cooper.

== Brahms First Symphony reference ==
Johannes Brahms's First Symphony is sometimes referred to as "Beethoven's Tenth Symphony", after a remark by von Bülow. (Note: "Bülow – formerly allied with Liszt and Wagner in the New German School – understood the musico-political climate of the day as well as anyone, and his reference to the "Tenth Symphony" ... could only have been calculated to incense. ... Bülow seems to be implying here that it was Brahms, not the 'Bayreuth master' [Richard Wagner], who could rightfully claim Beethoven's mantle." — Brodbeck (1997), p. 86) (Note: "And when at last he [Brahms] allowed it [his Symphony No. 1] to appear, he was very 'tetchy' over the admittedly banal remarks about it being Beethoven's tenth." — del Mar (1993), p. 1) Both Brahms' first symphony and Cooper's assembly of Beethoven's sketches for the tenth feature C-minor 6/8 Allegros.
