= Louis Schlösser =

German composer (1800–1886)

Louis Schlösser (17 November 1800 – 17 November 1886), born in Darmstadt where he made his career, was a violinist, composer, and conductor. He met Ludwig van Beethoven in 1822, and his recollections of this give a useful impression of Beethoven.

== Life ==
He was born in Darmstadt in 1800, son of Falk (or Frank) Schlösser. Originally named Lazarus or Löser, he was later known as Louis. His brother Bernhard Schlösser (1802–1859) became a painter in Frankfurt am Main, and his brother Theodor Schlösser became an academy professor in Colmar.

He played violin in the court orchestra of Darmstadt, and studied with Christian Heinrich Rinck. As a talented young musician he received a scholarship, and studied for three years, in Vienna with Ignaz von Seyfried, Joseph Mayseder, Jan Václav Voříšek and Antonio Salieri, and in Paris with Jean-François Le Sueur and Rudolph Kreutzer. He wrote his first compositions in Vienna. In Darmstadt he became concertmaster and from 1846 Hofkapellmeister; he gave concerts as soloist and conductor in Darmstadt and elsewhere. He was also a member of the Royal Swedish Academy of Music.

Louis Schlösser died in 1886. His grave is in the Jewish cemetery in Darmstadt.

== Compositions ==
About 70 compositions were published. His works include the operas Das Leben ein Traum and Die Braut des Herzogs, a melodrama Die Jahreszeiten, and music for Goethe's Faust.

== Meeting with Beethoven ==
Schlösser visited Ludwig van Beethoven in 1822; his recollections first appeared in print in 1885, in "Persönliche Erinnerungen an Beethoven" in the magazine Hallelujah VI, 20–21.

"Standing so near this artist, crowned with glory, I could realize the impression which his distinguished personality, his characteristic head, with its surrounding mane of heavy hair and the furrowed brow of a thinker, could not help but make on everyone.... I wrote down briefly the short questions and bits of information, which I addressed to him on the sheets of paper lying at hand, and he then answered in the greatest detail, so that not only did no hiatus ever occur but his calmness and patience when I asked him to explain certain passages in his scores actually astonished me.... At times, in these conversations, he let fall many sarcastic remarks about the actual art currents of the day in Vienna, which slumbered profoundly under the spell of Italian superficiality...."

Asked how he composes, Beethoven said: "I carry my thoughts about me for a long time, sometimes a very long time, before I set them down.... I make many changes, reject and reattempt until I am satisfied.... I am conscious of what I want, the basic idea never leaves me. It rises, grows upward, and I hear and see the picture as a whole take shape and stand forth before me as though cast in a single piece, so that all is left is the work of writing it down."
