= Sweater curse =

Knitting superstition

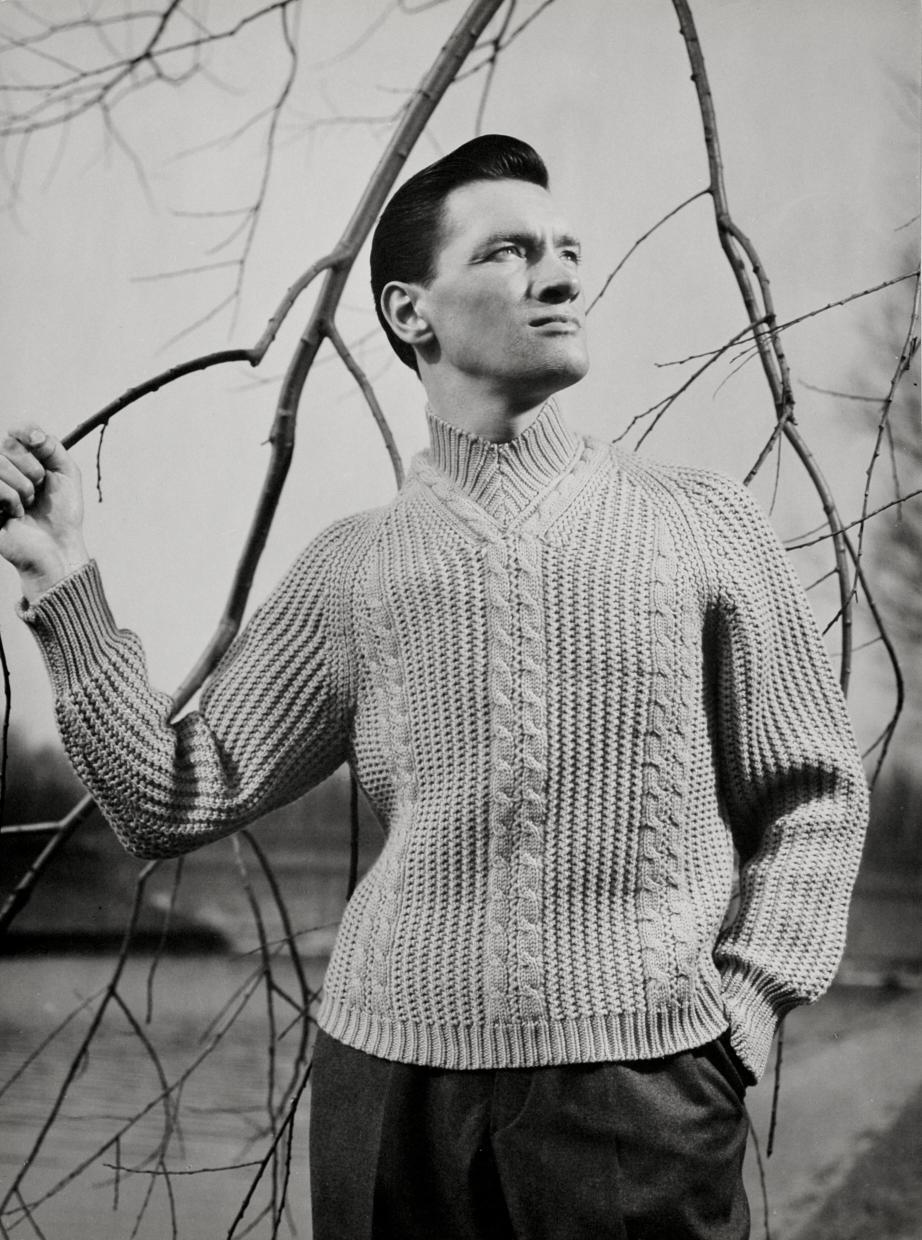
A man wearing a knitted sweater

The "sweater curse" or "curse of the love sweater" is a meme shared by many knitters and crocheters as a tongue-in-cheek superstition focusing on the frequent coincidence that a hand-knit sweater intended for a significant other is often accompanied by a breakup—according to the superstitution, the creation of the sweater actually causes the breakup, either during its construction or as a direct result of the completed gift.

== Belief in the superstition ==
A 2005 poll ran by Knitters Review among its audience of active knitters reported that 15% of respondents had experienced such breakups, while 41% overall thought the superstition was plausible.

== Responses to the superstition ==
Some authors in the knitting subculture have attempted to take the meme seriously by proposing plausible mechanisms to explain the results. Author Maggie Righetti has suggested that the superstition is a result of confirmation bias; knitters may remember breakups more clearly after giving a hand-knit sweater, which represents a significant investment of money (typically over $100), effort (~100,000 stitches), time (as much as a year), and romantic imagination. Everything2 user yclept proposes instead that the sheer length of the project means that it will outlast or run out simultaneously with the average casual relationship, or that the time devoted to the project could detract from time needed to build and sustain the relationship. K Welsh in knitty also suggests that the amount of effort put into the gift may cause either party to notice a mismatch in how seriously each of them sees the relationship.

Yclept, Tara Jon Manning, and L Roghaar also point out that the gift could also highlight a mismatch in how seriously each partner sees crafting in general—an unexpectedly blasé reaction to the gift by the recipient could incense the knitter, and outright rejection of homemade or domestic gifts could highlight serious incompatibilities.

L Roghaar considers a hand-knit gift as an emotional experience, an extended, affectionate meditation on the person receiving the gift, and Stephanie Pearl-McPhee relates the motto, "I knit my love into every stitch." To prevent such an intensive gift from exacerbating early mismatches in zeal, yclept and Judith Durant recommend "building up" to sweaters with simpler projects like hats, mittens, scarves, or socks, and possibly fully waiting until marriage to begin a sweater project. Manning advises knitters to consider whether their beau would actually want a hand-knit sweater before beginning the project, while P Feeley encourages them to take their partner's aesthetic or material preferences into account while designing the sweater, even if they aren't to the knitter's liking.

== See also ==
- Curse
- Knitting
- Knitting clubs
- Urban legend
