= Symphony No. 10 (Mahler) =

Final Symphony by Gustav Mahler

- by Gustav Mahler
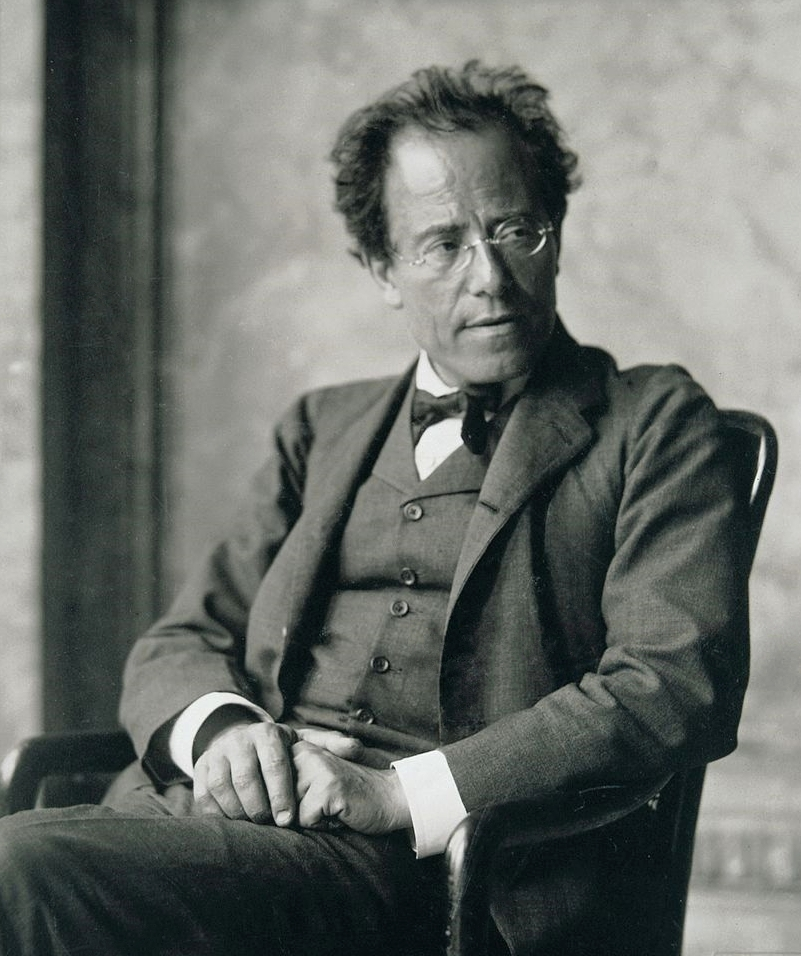
- Gustav Mahler in 1907
- Key: F-sharp major
- Composed: 1910 – Unfinished: Toblach
- Published: 1924: 1924 Paul Zsolnay Verlag (sketches); 1951 Associated Press (Berg edited movements I and III); 1967 Internationale Gustav Mahler Gesellschaft (complete facsimile)
- Recorded: Eugene Ormandy, Philadelphia Orchestra, 1965
- Movements: 5

Premiere
- Date: 13 August 1964
- Location: Royal Albert Hall, London
- Conductor: Berthold Goldschmidt
- Performers: London Symphony Orchestra

The Symphony No. 10 in F-sharp major by Gustav Mahler was written in the summer of 1910, and was his final composition. At the time of Mahler's death, the composition was substantially complete in the form of a continuous draft, but not fully elaborated or orchestrated, and thus not performable. Only the first movement is regarded as reasonably complete and performable as Mahler intended. Perhaps as a reflection of the inner turmoil he was undergoing at the time (Mahler knew that he had a failing heart and that his wife had been unfaithful), the 10th Symphony is arguably his most dissonant work.

== Composition ==
Mahler started work on his tenth symphony in July 1910 in Toblach, and ended his efforts in September. He did not complete the orchestral draft before his May 1911 death at the age of 50 from a streptococcal infection of the blood.

Mahler's drafts and sketches for the Tenth Symphony comprise 72 pages of full score, 50 pages of continuous short score draft (two of which are missing), and a further 44 pages of preliminary drafts, sketches, and inserts. In the form in which Mahler left it, the symphony has five movements:

1. Andante–Adagio: 275 bars drafted in orchestral and short score
2. Scherzo: 522 bars drafted in orchestral and short score
3. Purgatorio. Allegro moderato: 170 bars drafted in short score, the first 30 of which were also drafted in orchestral score
4. [Scherzo. Nicht zu schnell]: about 579 bars drafted in short score
5. Finale. Langsam, schwer: 400 bars drafted in short score

The parts in short score were usually in four staves. The designations of some movements were altered as work progressed: for example, the second movement was initially envisaged as a finale. The fourth movement was also relocated many times. Mahler then started on an orchestral draft of the symphony, which begins to bear some signs of haste after the halfway point of the first movement. He had got as far as orchestrating the first two movements and the opening 30 bars of the third movement when he had to put the work aside to make final revisions to the Ninth Symphony.

The circumstances surrounding the composition of the Tenth were highly unusual. Mahler was at the height of his compositional powers, but his personal life was in complete disarray, most recently compounded by the revelation that his young wife, Alma, had had an affair with the architect Walter Gropius. Mahler sought counseling from Sigmund Freud, and dedicated the Eighth Symphony to Alma on the verge of its successful première in Munich in a desperate attempt to repair the breach. The unsettled frame of Mahler's mind found expression in the despairing comments (many addressed to Alma) on the manuscript of the Tenth, and must have influenced its composition: on the final page of the final movement, Mahler wrote, "für dich leben! für dich sterben!" (To live for you! To die for you!) and the exclamation "Almschi!" (his pet name for Alma) underneath the last soaring phrase.

== Instrumentation ==
While instrumentation of the symphony cannot be defined precisely, owing to the incompleteness of the orchestral draft, the short score has occasional indications of instrumentation, and some of the orchestration may be surmised from the three movements of the orchestral draft. Deryck Cooke's performing version of the symphony (the one most often performed today) calls for the following orchestra:

Woodwinds
4 flutes (4th doubling piccolo)
4 oboes (4th doubling cor anglais)
3 B♭ and A clarinets
E♭ clarinet (doubling 4th clarinet)
bass clarinet
4 bassoons (3rd and 4th doubling contrabassoons)
Brass
4 horns
4 trumpets
4 trombones
tuba
Percussion
6 timpani (two players)
bass drum
large muffled military drum
cymbals
triangle
tam-tam
rute
glockenspiel
Strings
harp
1st violins
2nd violins
violas
cellos
double basses

== Realisations of the work ==
=== Early attempts ===
After Mahler's death there was no immediate attempt to complete the symphony, or render it in a state where it could be performed, although figures such as Paul Stefan described the high quality of the work as drafted. Arnold Schoenberg famously expressed the opinion that no one could possibly write a Tenth Symphony without being close to the hereafter (see Curse of the ninth); and a mistaken report led Richard Specht to suggest Mahler wanted the manuscript burned after his death. Hence it was only in the 1920s that Alma Mahler-Werfel asked the composer Ernst Krenek to make a fair copy of Mahler's orchestral draft for a festival of performances of Mahler works, and at about the same time some of the manuscripts were published by the company of Paul Zsolnay in facsimile (1924). The facsimile made evident that the stress of Mahler's final year had not adversely affected the composition, and that the draft contained passages of great beauty. Much of the manuscript, however, was too difficult to read and seemingly too chaotic for the unbroken continuity of the music to be clearly apparent.

In 1924 Krenek made a fair copy of only the first (Adagio) and third (Purgatorio) movements, and might have made a fair copy of the second movement, but as Mahler's draft of the Scherzo was very much patchier this was evidently less feasible. Alban Berg was enlisted to proofread the work, but his suggested corrections were never incorporated, while at the same time some unauthorised changes were introduced, possibly by one of the conductors of the first two performances, Franz Schalk and Alexander von Zemlinsky. Krenek is supposed to have renounced the changes to his version, which was subsequently published. Performances of the Krenek-Schalk/Zemlinsky version have been moderately successful, but the third movement is not generally convincing when taken out of context between the second and fourth movements: it is possible that some of the conductors who have refused to perform the Tenth, most famously Bruno Walter, Bernard Haitink and Leonard Bernstein, took exception to such a piecemeal representation.

In 1923, Alma had also sent a copy of the score to Willem Mengelberg in Amsterdam with the addition that two parts (the Adagio and Purgatorio) were 'absolutely performable'. Briefly after Schalk performed Krenek's score (with his own additions) on October 12, 1924, Alma sent what is believed to be Schalk's score to Mengelberg, who subsequently prepared his own edition with the aid of his assistant Cornelis Dopper. This version uses a larger orchestra and makes significant changes in dynamic markings and tempi. It was premiered on November 27, 1924, in the Amsterdam Concertgebouw, and subsequently played a number of times under Mengelberg's baton. This version has since received its first performance in nearly 100 years in December 2019 with the Hong Kong Philharmonic Orchestra conducted by Jaap van Zweden, who later recorded it.

It was soon realised that a performing version of only two movements did not give listeners a clear idea of the entire symphony, let alone constitute a complete artistic statement, so in the 1940s the American Mahler enthusiast Jack Diether tried to encourage several notable composers to realise the work. Figures such as Dmitri Shostakovich, Arnold Schoenberg, and Benjamin Britten (all of whom had been considerably influenced by the works of Mahler) refused, and instead the task was taken up by musicologists: early attempts at realising the entire work were made in America by Clinton Carpenter (completed 1949, subsequently revised 1966), in Germany by Hans Wollschläger (1954–1960, withdrawn), and in England by Joe Wheeler (1953–1965) and Deryck Cooke (1959–1960, 1966–1972 and 1976).

=== Deryck Cooke's versions ===
The various realisations produced by Cooke have, since the mid-1960s, become the basis for most performances and recordings.

A first, still incomplete performing version by Cooke stemmed from a performance and an associated lecture for radio broadcast on the BBC Third Programme, marking the centenary of Mahler's birth. This was aired on 19 December 1960, with the Philharmonia Orchestra conducted by Berthold Goldschmidt, who also assisted with the orchestration of Cooke's edition. At its first performance Cooke's realisation of the final movement proved to be a revelation to listeners, and Cooke resolved to complete the orchestration and elaboration of the Scherzo movements, which required much more compositional work than he had time for.

Alma Mahler, who had at one point taken the views of Bruno Walter to heart and demanded a veto on further performances of the Cooke performing version, changed her mind upon seeing Cooke's revised score and hearing the recording. She wrote Cooke a letter in English, postmarked New York, 8 May 1963, which Cooke includes in the preface pages to the score:

Dear Mr. Cooke,

Mr. Harold Byrns visited me here in New York. Today he read me your excellent articles on Mahler's Tenth Symphony and [showed me] your equally authoritative score. Afterwards I expressed my desire to finally listen to the London BBC tape. I was so moved by this performance that I immediately asked Mr. Byrns to play the work a second time. I then realised that the time had come when I must reconsider my previous decision not to permit the performance of this work. I have now decided once and for all to give you full permission to go ahead with performances in any part of the world. I enclose [a] copy of my letter of even date to [the] BBC.

Sincerely yours, Alma Maria Mahler

Cooke's revised and completed version, conducted by Goldschmidt, was premièred at the Proms on 13 August 1964 and recorded soon after. After Alma's death in December 1964, her daughter Anna allowed Cooke access to the full set of manuscript sketches, many of which had not been published four decades earlier. In the light of these, Cooke made a revised performing version in association with the British composers Colin and David Matthews between 1966 and 1972, and thereafter his final version before his death in 1976. The release of these pages also prompted the International Gustav Mahler Society in Vienna to issue another, more complete collection of Mahler's manuscripts in facsimile (Ricke, 1967). This revised edition of Cooke's first complete score was published in 1976, shortly before Cooke's death. A further revision, with mostly minor changes made by the three surviving collaborators, appeared in print in 1989.

==== Summary of the Cooke versions ====
Cooke's performing editions of the Tenth Symphony may be summarised as follows:

Cooke O – (1960, unpublished)
BBC performance; realizations of 1st, 3rd and 5th movements; partial realizations of 2nd and 4th movements; presented as part of a lecture-demonstration
Cooke I – first complete performing version (1960–1964, unpublished)
premiered 13 August 1964 by Berthold Goldschmidt; basis for recordings by Eugene Ormandy (1965–66) and Jean Martinon (1966)
Cooke II – second performing version (1966–1972, printed 1976)
premiered 15 October 1972 by Wyn Morris; basis for all recordings 1972–1992
Cooke III – slightly revised form of Cooke II (printed 1989)
reading errors corrected; minor changes to orchestration; enhanced by considerations concerning performance; editorial input from David and Colin Matthews and Berthold Goldschmidt; pages altered are marked with asterisks

=== Other complete versions ===
Clinton Carpenter (1921–2005) started working on his edition long before Cooke, and called his score a "completion" rather than a "performing version". Although he finished his version in 1949 (revising the work in 1966), it had to wait until 1983 for a performance. Carpenter did not merely review Mahler's symphonic output to guide him in his effort, but went so far as to include actual quotations from every Mahler symphony in his edition. The view has been expressed that much of this process of recomposition gives the impression that Carpenter has effectively written his own symphony using Mahler's as a basis.

The completion by Joseph Wheeler dates from 1953 to 1965, and like Cooke he also refined his ideas several times, so the final version of 1965 was actually the fourth iteration; the American composer Remo Mazzetti Jr. considers Wheeler's fourth version to be the closest to Mahler's late orchestral style. Wheeler's interventions are at the opposite end of the spectrum to Carpenter's, and he is less interventionist even than Cooke: he only makes additions to the score where performance is otherwise impossible. The effect is sparer than other completions, although Wheeler does increase the brass part to a greater degree than Cooke.

In recent years several further realisations of the symphony have been attempted: Remo Mazzetti initially made his 1989 version from dissatisfaction with the existing Cooke, Carpenter, and Wheeler editions, though the spur of preparing a performance of Wheeler's version in 1997 led him to recant his earlier view. Of his own revised version he remarked, "I really believe I got things right this time". Two more completions have been produced since, by the conductor Rudolf Barshai (2000), and a joint effort by Nicola Samale and Giuseppe Mazzuca (2001). All have been performed and recorded. The version by Samale and Mazzuca was commercially released in 2008 on Octavia Records, through Exton from Japan, with Martin Sieghart conducting the Arnhem Philharmonic Orchestra.

Another new version, by the Israeli-American conductor Yoel Gamzou, was premiered in Berlin in September 2010. Its author conducted the International Mahler Orchestra.

==== Chamber version ====
A chamber orchestra 'recreation' by the Maltese composer Michelle Castelletti premiered in November 2012 in Canterbury, UK, by the Canterbury Chamber Orchestra under Castelletti's direction. This version was recorded in October 2017 by Lapland Chamber Orchestra under the direction of John Storgårds and released by BIS Records on Super Audio CD (SACD) in March 2019. This chamber version was also recorded by Ensemble Mini under the direction of Joolz Gale in june 2016. This recording was released on SACD on the label Ars Produktion in 2021.

In 2011–12 the Portuguese composer/conductor/clarinetist Luis Carvalho produced another chamber version, this one for an ensemble of 21 players, which he revised in 2013–14. Described as a "reinvention of the draft", this version was premiered under Carvalho's direction in June 2014 at the 37th International Music Festival of Paços de Brandão.

==== Piano transcription ====
A piano transcription of the first movement (in the pre-Cooke 1950s UMP edition) was made by the British composer Ronald Stevenson; to this the English pianist Christopher White added solo transcriptions of the other movements in 2010. This composite version (whose last four movements do not follow Cooke's edition at all points) has been recorded with White as soloist.

=== Recomposition of the first movement ===
A project to recompose and recontextualise the first movement using samples and electronic effects was completed by Matthew Herbert and released by Deutsche Grammophon in 2010.

== Musical form ==
For his Tenth, Mahler devised a symmetrical structure with two large slow movements enclosing a core of faster inner movements, at the very centre of which is the Purgatorio movement.

The opening of the symphony, which is in the key of F♯ major, maintains a connection with the final movement of the Ninth. A long, bleak Andante melody for violas alone leads to the exposition of the slow first theme in the strings. This theme is developed and another, lighter theme is introduced. The music dies away and the violas repeat the opening theme. With slight variation, the opening adagio is repeated and developed with growing intensity. This also soon dies away, leaving several variations on the lighter second theme, followed by the climax, an extremely intense variation of the first theme. This restatement culminates in an extraordinary dissonance, after which the piece becomes very quiet.

The second movement, the first of two Scherzo movements, consists of two main ideas, the first of which is notated in consistently changing metres, which would have proved a challenge to Mahler's conducting technique had he lived to perform the symphony. This alternates with a joyful and typically Mahlerian Ländler. It is almost certainly this movement Paul Stefan had in mind when he described the symphony as containing "gaiety, even exuberance" (Cooke's translation).

The Purgatorio movement (originally entitled Purgatorio oder Inferno but the word "Inferno" was struck out) is a brief vignette presenting a struggle between alternately bleak and carefree melodies with a perpetuum mobile accompaniment, that are soon subverted by a diabolical undercurrent of more cynical music. The short movement fails to end in limbo though, as after a brief recapitulation a sudden harp arpeggio and gong stroke pull the rug out from under it; it is consigned to perdition by a final grim utterance from the double basses. According to Colin Matthews the title of this movement is almost certainly a reference to a poem about betrayal by his friend Siegfried Lipiner, rather than to Dante.

The scene is now set for the second scherzo, which has a somewhat driven and harried character, and which has significant connections to Mahler's recent work: the sorrowful first movement of Das Lied von der Erde, Das Trinklied vom Jammer der Erde. There is an annotation on the cover of the draft to the effect that in this movement "The Devil dances with me", and at the very end Mahler wrote "Ah! God! Farewell my lyre!". Cooke's version finishes with a percussion coda employing both timpanists, bass drum, and a large military drum which is to be muffled, that leads directly into the final slow movement. This scherzo differs from the first scherzo in tone, portraying a graver and more sinister mood.

The fifth and final movement begins with a military drum. This may be a reference to a funeral procession that Mahler once observed: on February 16, 1908, while staying with Alma in the Hotel Majestic on Central Park West in New York City, the funeral cortège of Deputy Fire Chief Charles W. Kruger (whose death in the line of duty inspired the creation of the Manhattan Firemen's Memorial) stopped below their hotel window. From his room on the 11th floor, the only sound that could be heard was the muffled stroke of a large bass drum preceding a moment of silence. The introduction to the fifth movement re-enacts this scene as a rising line on tubas supported by two double bassoons slowly tries to make headway and is repeatedly negated by the loud (but muffled) drum strokes. However, some musicologists believe that this narrative has been made up by Alma Mahler, and that the use of the drums in fact stems from the shock Mahler suffered when he found out about his wife's affair.

The emotional weight of the symphony is resolved by the long final movement, which incorporates and ties together music from the earlier movements, whereby the opening passage of the symphony, now transferred to the horns, is found to be the answer that tames the savage dissonance that had disturbed the end of the first movement. The music of the flute solo that was heard after the introductory funeral scene can now return to close the symphony peacefully, and unexpectedly, in the principal key of F♯ major. The draft for this movement reveals that Mahler had originally written the ending in B♭ major, but in the process of revision worked the same music into F♯, the key of the first movement.

== Recordings of Mahler's Tenth ==
The original, incomplete Cooke version was first recorded by the BBC as noted above; the first complete version (denoted Cooke I) was also premièred by Goldschmidt, this time with the London Symphony Orchestra in 1964; the first commercial recording appeared in 1966 (recorded in 1965), conducted by Eugene Ormandy with the Philadelphia Orchestra. Several notable recordings of the revised Cooke (version II) have been made: the first, made by Wyn Morris in 1972 has recently been reissued. Simon Rattle's 1980 recording with the Bournemouth Symphony Orchestra gave the former percussionist an opportunity to make some pointed revisions, most noticeably giving prominence to the military drum in the fifth movement, which is played as loudly as possible without being muffled or dampened.

Other notable recordings include those of: Kurt Sanderling – Berliner Sinfonie-Orchester – 1979; Cooke II – employing revisions/alterations by Sanderling himself and Berthold Goldschmidt; Riccardo Chailly – Berlin Radio Symphony Orchestra – 1986; Cooke II; Eliahu Inbal – Frankfurt Radio Symphony – 1993; Cooke II, and Rattle again – this time with the Berlin Philharmonic – 1999; Cooke III, again with alterations by Rattle. Cooke's second version was also recorded by James Levine and the Philadelphia Orchestra. The Adagio movement from this recording was originally recorded and released in 1978, as the fourth side of a 2-LP set containing a complete performance of the 5th symphony, recorded the previous year. The remaining movements of Cooke II were recorded in 1980. The same performance of the 1978 Adagio was incorporated with the 1980 recording of the remainder in a different 2-LP set, with no apparent differences in sound quality.

Some conductors, notably Hermann Scherchen, Leonard Bernstein, Bernard Haitink, Pierre Boulez, Michael Tilson Thomas, Rafael Kubelík, Václav Neumann, Claudio Abbado, Klaus Tennstedt, Lorin Maazel and Gennady Rozhdestvensky have chosen to perform and record just the Adagio, since they interpret it as the only movement completed by Mahler himself. Other noted Mahlerians, such as Georg Solti, omit the Tenth from their repertoire altogether.

In 2011, to mark the centenary of Mahler's death, Testament Records released a 3-CD set featuring Cooke's BBC lecture, the 1960 studio performance of the incomplete version as well as the 1964 world premiere conducted by Goldschmidt. The release received a Gramophone Award in the 'Historical' category.

=== Recordings of the completed symphony ===
| Year | Conductor | Orchestra | Version |
|---|---|---|---|
| 1960 | Berthold Goldschmidt | Philharmonia Orchestra | Cooke Incomplete First Version from 1960 |
| 1964 | Berthold Goldschmidt | London Symphony Orchestra | Cooke I 1964 World Premiere |
| 1965 | Eugene Ormandy | Philadelphia Orchestra | Cooke I |
| 1966 | Jean Martinon | Chicago Symphony Orchestra (concert originally recorded for local and syndicated broadcast by WFMT-FM, Chicago. Issued on CD in 1991 by the Chicago Symphony) | Cooke I |
| 1972 | Wyn Morris | New Philharmonia Orchestra | Cooke II |
| 1979 | Kurt Sanderling | Berliner Sinfonie-Orchester | Cooke II |
| 1980 | James Levine | Philadelphia Orchestra | Cooke II |
| 1980 | Simon Rattle | Bournemouth Symphony Orchestra | Cooke II |
| 1986 | Riccardo Chailly | Radio-Symphonie-Orchester Berlin (as it was then called) | Cooke II |
| 1992 | Eliahu Inbal | Radio-Sinfonie-Orchester Frankfurt | Cooke II |
| 1993 | Mark Wigglesworth | BBC National Orchestra of Wales | Cooke III |
| 1994 | Leonard Slatkin | St. Louis Symphony Orchestra | Mazzetti I |
| 1994 | Harold Farberman | Philharmonia Hungarica | Carpenter |
| 1997 | Robert Olson | Colorado MahlerFest Orchestra | Wheeler IV |
| 1999 | Simon Rattle | Berlin Philharmonic | Cooke III |
| 2000 | Jesús López Cobos | Cincinnati Symphony Orchestra | Mazzetti II |
| 2000 | Robert Olson | Polish National Radio Symphony Orchestra, Katowice | Wheeler IV |
| 2001 | Andrew Litton | Dallas Symphony Orchestra | Carpenter |
| 2001 | Rudolf Barshai | Junge Deutsche Philharmonie | Barshai |
| 2003 | Rudolf Barshai | Tokyo Metropolitan Symphony Orchestra | Barshai |
| 2005 | Michael Gielen | South-West German Radio-Symphony Orchestra, Baden-Baden | Cooke III |
| 2007 | Gianandrea Noseda | BBC Philharmonic | Cooke III |
| 2008 | Daniel Harding | Vienna Philharmonic | Cooke III |
| 2008 | Martin Sieghart | Arnhem Philharmonic | Samale/Mazzuca (SACD) |
| 2009 | Lan Shui | Singapore Symphony Orchestra | Carpenter (DVD & Blu-ray) |
| 2010 | David Zinman | Tonhalle-Orchester Zürich | Carpenter II |
| 2010 | Yoel Gamzou | International Mahler Orchestra | Gamzou 2010 World Premiere |
| 2011 | Emil Tabakov | Bulgarian National Radio Symphony Orchestra | Cooke III |
| 2011 | Eliahu Inbal | Royal Concertgebouw Orchestra | Cooke III (DVD & Blu-ray) |
| 2011 | Mark Wigglesworth | Melbourne Symphony Orchestra | Cooke III |
| 2012 | Vladimir Ashkenazy | Sydney Symphony Orchestra | Barshai |
| 2014 | Eliahu Inbal | Tokyo Metropolitan Symphony Orchestra | Cooke III (SACD) |
| 2014 | Yannick Nézet-Séguin | Orchestre Métropolitain | Cooke III |
| 2015 | Thomas Dausgaard | Seattle Symphony | Cooke III |
| 2017 | Yannick Nézet-Séguin | Rotterdam Philharmonic Orchestra | Cooke III |
| 2019 | John Storgårds | Lapland Chamber Orchestra | Castelletti (chamber version) (SACD) |
| 2020 | Osmo Vänskä | Minnesota Orchestra | Cooke III (SACD) |

== Bibliography ==
- Bloomfield, Theodore. "In Search of Mahler's Tenth: The Four Performing Versions as Seen by a Conductor", The Musical Quarterly, Vol. 74, No. 2 (1990), pp. 175–196
- Chew, Teng-Leong. "Performing Versions of the Tenth Symphony." Naturlaut, vol. 1, no. 2 (2002), pp. 7–10 (online)
- Rothkamm, Jörg. Gustav Mahlers Zehnte Symphonie. Entstehung, Analyse, Rezeption, Frankfurt: Peter Lang, 2003 (Reprint and e-book 2012).
- Rothkamm, Jörg. "The Tenth Symphony: Analysis of its Composition and 'Performing Versions'", The Cambridge Companion to Mahler, ed. Jeremy Barham. Cambridge: University Press, 2007, pp. 150–161.
- Rothkamm, Jörg. "Five-Movement Orchestral Versions of Gustav Mahler’s Tenth Symphony", News about Mahler Research, vol. 53 (2006), pp. 48–66.
- Rothkamm, Jörg. "Berthold Goldschmidt und Gustav Mahler. Zur Entstehung von Deryck Cookes Konzertfassung der X. Symphonie", Hamburg: von Bockel, 2000.
- Vernon, David (19 May 2022). Beauty and Sadness: Mahler's 11 Symphonies. Edinburgh: Candle Row Press, 2022. ISBN 978-1739659905.
