= Avie Records =

AVIE Records
- Parent company: Music Company International Ltd.
- Founded: 2002
- Founder: Simon Foster; Melanne Mueller
- Status: Active
- Distributor(s): Proper Music Distribution; Naxos of America Inc. The Orchard
- Genre: Classical music
- Country of origin: United Kingdom
- Location: Portsmouth
- Official website: http://www.avie-records.com/

AVIE Records is a UK-based independent classical music recording company founded in 2002 by Simon Foster and Melanne Mueller who devised a unique business model based on artist ownership. Foster and Mueller continue to run the company together with executives Barry McCann and Steve Winn. The label maintains offices in the UK and US.

AVIE's catalogue includes over 300 recordings by artists including Harry Bicket and the Orchestra of the Age of Enlightenment, Semyon Bychkov and the WDR Symphony Orchestra, Augustin Hadelich, Andreas Haefliger, the Handel and Haydn Society, Jon Lord, Antônio Meneses, New York Polyphony, Menahem Pressler, Rachel Barton Pine, and Jeannette Sorrell and Apollo's Fire.

AVIE works with various independent distributors worldwide making CDs available in over 30 countries. Recordings are widely available on digital platforms including Apple Music, Amazon and Spotify, among many others.

AVIE's artists have won numerous international awards. In 2016, Laura Karpman won a Grammy Award for her creation ASK YOUR MAMA based on the poetry of Langston Hughes. Lorraine Hunt Lieberson, Monica Huggett, the Dufay Collective and Antônio Meneses have received Grammy Nominations. Gramophone Awards have gone to Julian Bream for his DVD My Life in Music, Adrian Chandler and his ensemble La Serenissima, for Vivaldi: The French Connection, Andrew Parrott and the Taverner Consort for Western Wind: Mass by John Taverner and Court Music for Henry VIII, Trevor Pinnock for his Brandenburg Concertos with the specially formed European Brandenburg Ensemble, and viol quartet Phantasm for its recording of Gibbons’ Consorts. Other international citations include France's Diapason d'Or de l’année for Simon Trpčeski’s Rachmaninov Piano Concertos Nos. 2 and 3, with Vasily Petrenko and the Royal Liverpool Philharmonic Orchestra.

Projects released by AVIE include the first release by the Seattle Opera of Wagner's Ring cycle; numerous world premiere recordings of the music of Hans Gál including the Four Symphonies by Kenneth Woods and Orchestra of the Swan, the Cello Concerto by Antônio Meneses with Claudio Cruz and the Royal Northern Sinfonia, the Piano Concerto by Sarah Beth Briggs with Kenneth Woods and the Royal Northern Sinfonia, and the complete works for solo piano by Leon McCawley; the world premiere recording of Samuel Coleridge-Taylor’s Violin Concerto by Philippe Graffin with Michael Hankinson and the Johannesburg Philharmonic Orchestra; and the complete Beethoven symphonies by Douglas Boyd and the Manchester Camerata.

AVIE passionately nurtures young, emerging talent and has helped to build the international reputations of several artists. These include Avery Fisher Career Grant, Warner Music Prize and Grammy Award winner violinist Augustin Hadelich; Luiza Borac who won a BBC Music Magazine Award for her survey of Enescu's Piano Works; and Vivaldi authority Adrian Chandler who was the 2010 Gramophone Award winner in the Baroque Instrumental category.

Since its inception, AVIE has had a relationship with the San Francisco Symphony, coordinating international distribution and marketing of the orchestra's in-house label SFS Media which has won numerous Grammy Awards for its Mahler Symphony cycle with conductor Michael Tilson Thomas.
