= Sarah Beth Briggs =

British classical pianist

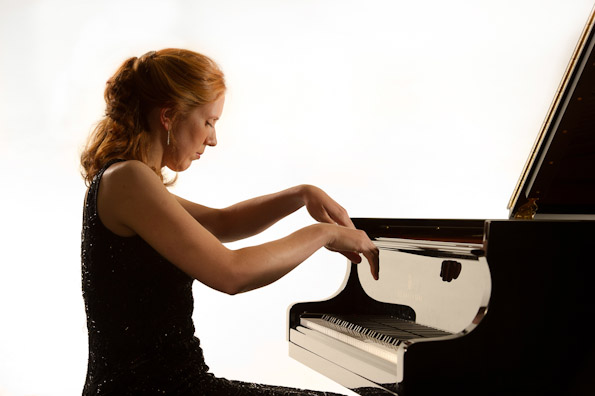
Sarah Beth Briggs

Sarah Beth Briggs (born 2 June 1972 in Newcastle upon Tyne, England) is a British classical pianist.

Briggs was a finalist in the BBC Young Musician competition at the age of 11 in 1984 and one of the youngest recipients of a Dame Myra Hess Award at the same age. She was joint winner of the International Mozart Competition in Salzburg at the age of 15. She studied in Newcastle, York and Birmingham with Denis Matthews, in Switzerland with one of Claudio Arrau's most renowned students, Edith Fischer and, through a Hindemith Foundation chamber scholarship, with Bruno Giuranna.

A soloist and chamber musician, Briggs has broadcast, performed live and given masterclasses in the UK, around Europe and the US and has worked with many international orchestras including the Hallé, London Mozart Players, London Philharmonic, English Chamber Orchestra, Scottish Chamber Orchestra, Ulster Orchestra, Royal Philharmonic, Manchester Camerata, Royal Liverpool Philharmonic, BBC Concert Orchestra, Royal Northern Sinfonia, Hofer Symphoniker and the Vienna Chamber Orchestra. She was a founder member of the Anton Stadler Trio with clarinettist, Janet Hilton and violist, Robin Ireland and Clarion 3 with Janet Hilton and bassoonist, Laurence Perkins and now performs in the Juritz Briggs Duo (with David Juritz, violin) the Briggs Piano Trio (with David Juritz, violin and Kenneth Woods, cello) and the Lisney Briggs Duo (with James Lisney, piano).

Briggs also taught keyboard at the University of York.

Briggs has recorded works by Bartók, Beethoven, Brahms, Britten (the world premiere of whose Three Character Pieces she gave in 1989), Chopin, Debussy, Haydn, Mozart, Schubert and Rawsthorne on the Semaphore label and Brahms, Schumann, Mendelssohn, Hans Gal and Shostakovich on the AVIE Records label, including a world premiere recording of Hans Gál's Piano Concerto (coupled with Mozart Concerto in E flat, K482) with the Royal Northern Sinfonia and Kenneth Woods.

== Discography ==
- Sarah Beth Briggs Plays Haydn, Mozart, Bartok, Brahms and Chopin SML MP14
- Sarah Beth Briggs Plays Beethoven, Brahms, Rawsthorne and Britten SML MP21
- Sarah Beth Briggs Plays Beethoven, Haydn and Mozart SML MP28
- Sarah Beth Briggs Plays Mozart, Beethoven and Schubert SML MP35
- Sarah Beth Briggs Plays Debussy and Chopin SML MP49
- Sarah Beth Briggs, Royal Northern Sinfonia and Kenneth Woods/Bradley Creswick. World premiere recording Hans Gál Piano Concerto and Mozart Concerto, K482. AV2358
- Sarah Beth Briggs Briggs Piano Trio. Sarah Beth Briggs David Juritz Kenneth Woods. Gál & Shostakovich AV2390
- Sarah Beth Briggs Schumann Papillons, Kinderszenen. Brahms opp 117 & 118 AV2398
- Sarah Beth Briggs The Austrian Connection Haydn Mozart Schubert Gal AV2418
- Sarah Beth Briggs Variations. Mozart Beethoven Mendelssohn Brahms AV2569
