= Clara Haskil =

Romanian classical pianist (1895–1960)

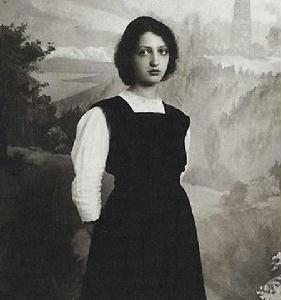
- Born: January 7, 1895; Bucharest, Kingdom of Romania
- Died: December 7, 1960 (aged 65); Brussels, Belgium
- Resting place: Montparnasse Cemetery, Paris, France
- Occupation: Classical pianist
- Years active: 1910–1960
- Known for: Interpretations of Mozart and early Romantic repertoire
- Parent(s): Isaac Haskil; Berthe Haskil (née Moscona)

Clara Haskil (7 January 1895 – 7 December 1960) was a Romanian classical pianist, renowned as an interpreter of the classical and early romantic repertoire. She was particularly noted for her performances and recordings of Mozart. She was also a noted interpreter of Beethoven, Schumann, and Scarlatti.

== Biography ==
Haskil was born into a Jewish family in Bucharest, Romania. Her father, Isaac Haskil (1858–1899), immigrated to Romania from Bessarabia (then part of the Russian Empire); he died of acute pneumonia when Clara was four years old. Her mother, Berthe Haskil (née Moscona) (1866–1917), of Sephardi origin, was one of six children of David Moscona and Rebecca Aladjem. Clara was the middle one of three sisters, with an older sister Lili and the younger Jeanne, who was a violinist.

Haskil studied in Vienna under Richard Robert (whose pupils also included Rudolf Serkin and George Szell) and briefly with Ferruccio Busoni. She later moved to France, where she studied with Gabriel Fauré's pupil Joseph Morpain, whom she always credited as one of her greatest influences. The same year (1905) she entered the Conservatoire de Paris, officially to study with Alfred Cortot although most of her instruction came from Lazare Lévy and Mme Giraud-Latarse, and graduated at age 15 with a Premier Prix. Upon graduating, Haskil began to tour Europe, though her career was cut short by one of the numerous physical ailments she suffered throughout her life. In 1913 she was fitted with a plaster cast in an attempt to halt the progression of scoliosis. Frequent illnesses, combined with extreme stage fright that appeared in 1920, kept her from critical or financial success. Most of her life was spent in abject poverty. It was only after World War II, during a series of concerts in the Netherlands in 1949, that she began to win acclaim. In 1951 she moved to Vevey in Switzerland. Not long after that she was appointed a Chevalier of the Légion d'Honneur by the French state.

As a pianist, her playing was marked by a purity of tone and phrasing that may have come from her skill as a violinist. Transparency and sensitive inspiration were other hallmarks of her style.

Well regarded as a chamber musician, Haskil collaborated with George Enescu, Eugène Ysaÿe, Pablo Casals, Dinu Lipatti, Joseph Szigeti, Géza Anda, Isaac Stern, Henryk Szeryng and Arthur Grumiaux, with whom she played her last concert. While renowned primarily as a violinist, Grumiaux was also a fine pianist, and he and Haskil would sometimes swap instruments.

She played as a soloist under the baton of many conductors, including Ansermet, Barbirolli, Baumgartner, Beecham, Boult, Celibidache, Cluytens, Dixon, Fricsay, Giulini, Hindemith, Inghelbrecht, Jochum, Karajan, Kempe, Klemperer, Kubelík, Markevitch, Monteux, Munch, Paray, Rosbaud, Sawallisch, Solti, Stokowski and Szell.

One of her most famous recordings as a soloist with orchestra is of Mozart's Piano Concertos No. 20 in D minor, K. 466 and No. 24 in C minor, K. 491, made in November 1960 with the Orchestre Lamoureux conducted by Igor Markevitch (issued on CD by Philips Classics under No. 464 718–2; reissued under No. 478 479–9; and included in Clara Haskil Edition Box Set Decca 478 254–1); this recording features an unusually slow, pensive performance of K. 466's third movement and a very subtle, highly lyrical and yet, in some way, vigorous playing of K. 491's second movement.

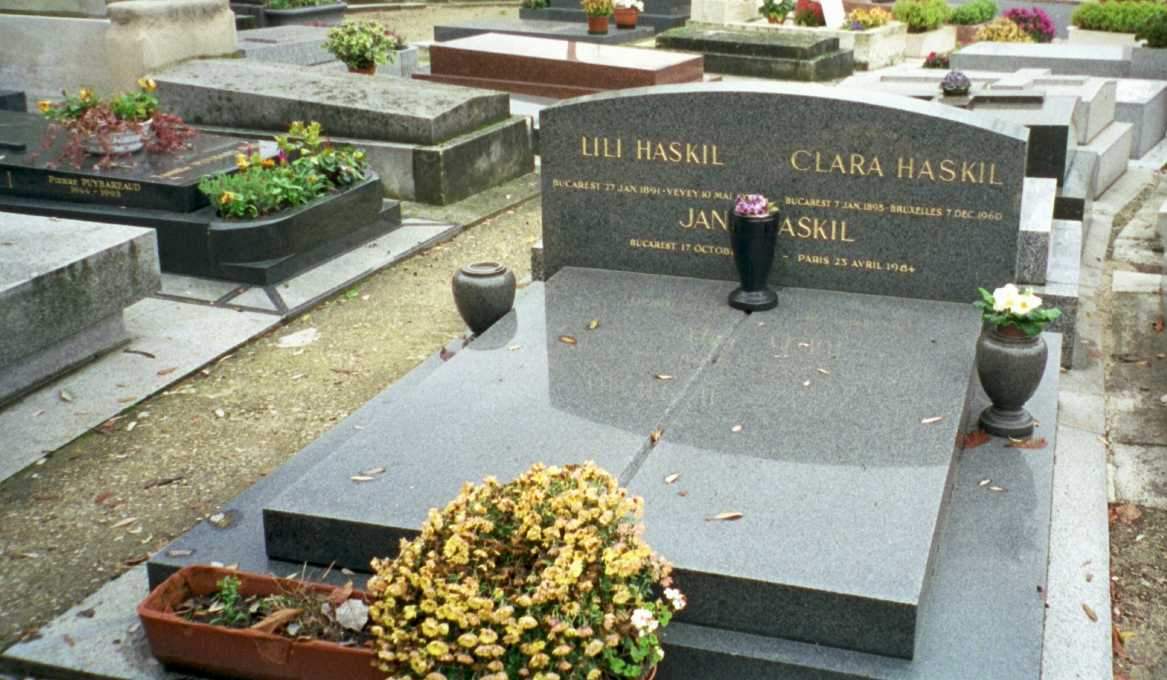
Grave of Clara Haskil in Montparnasse Cemetery, Paris

Haskil died from injuries received in a fall on a staircase at the Brussels-South railway station. She was due to play at a concert with Arthur Grumiaux the following day. She was aged 65.

An esteemed friend of Haskil, Charlie Chaplin, described her talent by saying "In my lifetime I have met three geniuses: Professor Einstein, Winston Churchill, and Clara Haskil. I am not a trained musician but I can only say that her touch was exquisite, her expression wonderful, and her technique extraordinary."

In a 2013 interview, Pope Francis mentioned Haskil as one of his favorite musicians, especially when performing Mozart.

In August 2017 Clara Haskil, le mystère de l'interprète, a radio-documentary of 70 minutes by Pascal Cling, Prune Jaillet and Pierre-Olivier François was broadcast.

== Prix Clara Haskil ==
The Clara Haskil International Piano Competition is held biennially in her memory. The brochure reads: "The Clara Haskil Competition was founded in 1963 to honour and perpetuate the memory of the incomparable Swiss pianist, of Romanian origin, who was born in Bucharest in 1895. It takes place every two years in Vevey, Switzerland, where Clara Haskil resided from 1942 until her death in Brussels in 1960. A street in Vevey bears her name. The competition welcomes young pianists from all over the world, who pursue the musical ideal that is inspired by Clara Haskil and which will always remain exemplary."
