= Josef Witt =

Austrian opera singer

- Born: May 17, 1901
- Died: January 3, 1994 (aged 92)

Kammersänger Josef Witt (17 May 1901 – 3 January 1994) was a tenor who was a regular performer at the Vienna State Opera before World War II. His name is sometimes spelled Joseph Witt.

In 1923, Witt created the role of Li in Hans Gál's opera, Die heilige Ente, in Düsseldorf. He performed the role of Palestrina in the production of Pfitzner’s opera Palestrina at the State Opera in 1937.

He conducted opera classes at the Akadamie fur Musik und Darstellende Kunst in Vienna until his death in 1994. Singers like Norman Bailey, Walter Berry, Mimi Coertse and Ernst Gutstein, who went on to have important opera careers in Austria and Germany, were among his students.

== Roles created ==
- The airman in Hindemith's Lehrstück (1929)
- Robespierre in Gottfried von Einem's Dantons Tod (1947)

== Recordings ==
He made several widely circulated recordings of Strauss operas with Karl Böhm and Clemens Krauss, in which he sang secondary parts in operas like Ariadne auf Naxos and Arabella.
