= Song of the Night =

Song of the Night may refer to:

- Symphony No. 7 (Mahler), 1904-5 symphony by Gustav Mahler, known as Lied der Nacht
- Symphony No. 3 (Szymanowski), 1916 chorus and orchestra by Karol Szymanowski, known as Song of the Night (Piosenka nocy)
- Das Lied der Nacht, 1926 opera by Hans Gal

== See also ==
- Night Song (disambiguation)
