= Hans Gál =

Austrian composer, musicologist and pianist (1890–1987)

Hans Gál OBE
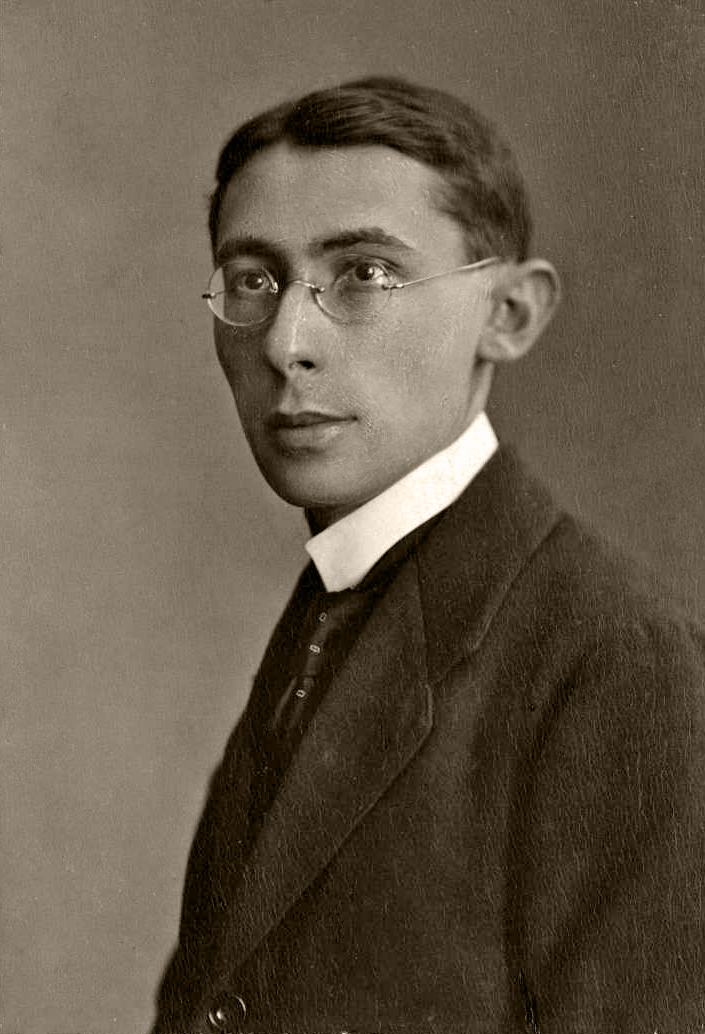
- Gál, c. 1913–1916
- Born: 5 August 1890
- Died: 3 October 1987 (aged 97)
- Occupations: Composer, pedagogue, musicologist, author

Hans Gál OBE (5 August 1890 – 3 October 1987) was an Austrian composer, pedagogue, musicologist, and author, who emigrated to the United Kingdom in 1938.

== Life ==
Gál was born to a Jewish family in the small village of Brunn am Gebirge, Lower Austria, just outside Vienna, the son of a doctor, Josef Gál. In 1909, his piano teacher Richard Robert (who also taught George Szell, Rudolf Serkin and Clara Haskil) appointed Gál as a teacher when he became director of the New Vienna Conservatory. From 1909 to 1913, Gál studied music history at the University of Vienna under music historian Guido Adler, who published Gál's doctoral dissertation on the style of the young Beethoven in his own Studien zur Musikwissenschaft. From 1909 to 1911, Gál studied composition privately with Eusebius Mandyczewski, who had been a close friend of Johannes Brahms, and with whom he later edited ten volumes of the Complete Edition of Brahms's works, published by Breitkopf & Härtel in 1926. Mandyczewski became a "spiritual father" to him.

In 1915, Gál was the first recipient of the new Austrian State Prize for Composition for his first symphony, though he later discarded this work and its successors, as well as a large number of works composed up to that time. During World War I he served in Serbia, the Carpathians and Italy. He returned from the war with a completed opera, Der Arzt der Sobeide, which was performed in Breslau (modern Wrocław) in 1919 under the conductor Julius Prüwer.

After World War I, the political situation in Austria was extremely difficult, exacerbated by runaway inflation. Gál was appointed to the (initially unpaid) post of Lector for music theory at the University of Vienna (a post once held by Anton Bruckner). Despite the financial difficulties he married Hanna Schick (a relative of the philosopher and psychologist Wilhelm Jerusalem). His second opera, Die heilige Ente (The Sacred Duck), received its première in Düsseldorf in April 1923 under Szell and was performed with continued success in 20 theatres. Together with his third opera, Das Lied der Nacht (The Song of the Night), it established his wider reputation. In 1928 he won a Columbia Schubert Centenary Prize for his Sinfonietta, later retitled his First Symphony. The next year, with the support of such important musicians as Wilhelm Furtwängler, Fritz Busch and Richard Strauss, he was appointed to the directorship of the Mainz Conservatory. The next three years were among the happiest and most productive of his life.

=== World War II and later life ===
The rise of the Nazis in Germany brought Gál's career in Mainz to an abrupt end on account of his Jewish ancestry. When the Nazis took over Mainz in March 1933, he was instantly dismissed from his post and performance and publication of his works in Germany were prohibited. His fourth opera, Die beiden Klaas (Rich Claus, Poor Claus), which was to have received a double première in Dresden and Hamburg, was cancelled and the piece was not performed until an English translation was presented by York Opera in 1990. He and his family returned to Vienna, but the shadow of the German Reich was already evident there, and he found no permanent position.

Immediately after the Anschluss in 1938, Gál fled to London, with the intention of emigrating to the United States. But he remained in Britain, where he met the musician and scholar Donald Tovey, who invited him to come to Edinburgh, where Tovey taught at the university. There were no permanent openings for professors, but Tovey found him some work in late 1938, and when the war broke out in 1939, the Gáls moved to Edinburgh permanently. In 1940, he was interned as an enemy alien in Huyton Camp near Liverpool and Central Camp in Douglas, Isle of Man, from May to September.

After his release, he returned to Edinburgh, where he remained for the rest of his life. He had continued to compose throughout this time, publishing his Second Symphony in 1942. He became a lecturer in musical education at the University of Edinburgh in 1945, where he taught until his retirement in 1960.

In Edinburgh, he was a respected member of the local musical scene, and one of the founders of the Edinburgh International Festival in 1947. He conducted the premiere of his Serenade the previous year at the debut concert of the Edinburgh Chamber Orchestra, one of the oldest amateur orchestras in Edinburgh, founded by Theodora di Marco and her sister Norma. His later honours include the Grand Austrian State Prize for Music (1957), appointment as an Officer of the Order of the British Empire (1964) and the Austrian Cross of Honour for Science and Art, 1st class (1971).

He died at Edinburgh in October 1987, at the age of 97.

== Music ==
Gál's style is rooted in the Austro-German musical tradition, but from the early 1920s he had developed his own musical language, to which he remained true throughout his long career. He never followed prevailing fashions, nor abandoned his belief in the importance of tonality. Though his style cannot be derived from any single influence, one can nevertheless identify particular affinities, especially with the 18th century Viennese composers whose clarity, plasticity and playful humour are basic constituents.

His works combine Romantic intensity with emotional restraint, and the chromatic harmonies and extended tonality of the pre-serial early moderns with a Schubert-like love of melody, integrated with a polyphonic texture that derives from his lifelong engagement with the works of J.S. Bach. His output was considerable: over 150 published works in virtually all genres, including, in addition to his four operas, four symphonies, four string quartets, two large-scale cantatas with orchestra, other orchestral works, chamber music, sets of 24 preludes and 24 fugues for piano, and vocal works of various kinds.

== Legacy ==
=== Postwar neglect ===
Gál's music continued to appear regularly in concert in the years immediately following World War II thanks the advocacy of colleagues like Rudolf Schwarz and Otto Schmidtgen. As the years passed, and Gál's advocates ceased working, his music fell into near-complete neglect. This process was accelerated by a shift in the BBC's programming policy: from the 1960s onward, the national broadcaster explicitly favoured music from the avant-garde or twelve-tone schools.

=== 21st-century revival ===
The beginning of the 21st century has seen a revival of interest in Gál's music. The Gál discography now includes the four symphonies (Kenneth Woods and the Orchestra of the Swan), the complete piano music (Leon McCawley), the complete string trios (Ensemble Epomeo), concertos and concertinos for violin, cello and piano (soloists Annette-Barbara Vogel, Matthew Sharp and Sarah Beth Briggs with conductor Kenneth Woods and the English Symphony Orchestra and Royal Northern Sinfonia), the Cello Concerto (Antônio Meneses) and the complete string quartets (Edinburgh Quartet), as well as many chamber and vocal works. Recent releases include the first of Gál's operas, Das Lied der Nacht.

Gál was BBC Radio 3's Composer of the Week in May 2014.

Since 2016, the Exilarte Center at the University of Music and Performing Arts Vienna has preserved the composer's musical estate as well as comprehensive private and professional correspondence with publishers, radio stations, colleagues, and friends.

== Books ==
- Anleitung zum Partiturlesen. Vienna: Philharmonischer Verlag, 1923. English edition: Directions for Score Reading. London, 1924.
- The Golden Age of Vienna. London: Parish, 1948.
- Johannes Brahms. Werk und Persönlichkeit. Frankfurt am Main: Fischer, 2nd edn. 1980. English edition: Brahms: his Work and Personality. New York: Knopf, 1963 / London: Severn House, 1975.
- Richard Wagner. Versuch einer Würdigung. Frankfurt am Main: Fischer, 1963. English edition: Richard Wagner. London: Gollancz / New York: Stein & Day, 1976.
- The Musician's World. Great Musicians in their Letters. London: Thames & Hudson, 1965.
- Franz Schubert oder die Melodie. Frankfurt am Main: Fischer, 1970. English edition: Franz Schubert and the Essence of Melody. London: Gollancz, 1974.
- Drei Meister – drei Welten. Brahms, Wagner, Verdi. Frankfurt am Main: Fischer, 1975.
- Brahms: Briefe. Ed. by Hans Gál. Frankfurt am Main: Fischer, 1979.
- Schumann Orchestral Music. London: BBC, 1979.
- Giuseppe Verdi und die Oper. Frankfurt am Main: Fischer, 1982.
- Musik hinter Stacheldraht, edited by Eva Fox-Gál. Bern: Peter Lang, 2003. English edition: Music behind Barbed Wire: A Diary of Summer 1940. London: Toccata Press, 2014.

== Selected works ==
=== Operas ===
- Op. 4 Der Arzt der Sobeide (Sobeide's Doctor) (1917–18)
- Op. 15 Die heilige Ente (The Sacred Duck) (1920–1)
- Op. 23 Das Lied der Nacht (The Song of the Night) (1924–5)
- Op. 42 Die beiden Klaas (Rich Claus, Poor Claus) (1932–3)

=== Orchestral works ===
- Op. 3b Serbische Weisen (Serbian Dances) (1937)
- Op. 20 Ouvertüre zu einem Puppenspiel (Overture to a puppet play) (1923)
- Op. 30 Symphony No. 1 in D major (1927)
- Op. 36 Ballet Suite Scaramuccio (1929)
- Op. 38 Der Zauberspiegel (The Magic Mirror). Suite for orchestra (1930)
- Op. 42b Burleske (Burlesque). From Die beiden Klaas: intro. to Act 3. (1933)
- Op. 45 A Pickwickian Overture (1939–44)
- Op. 46 Serenade for string orchestra (1937)
- Op. 48 Lilliburlero. Improvisations on a martial melody (1945)
- Op. 53 Symphony No. 2 in F major (1942–3)
- Op. 54 Kaledonische Suite (Caledonian Suite). Scottish tunes for small orchestra (1949)
- Op. 62 Symphony No. 3 in A major (1951–2)
- Op. 66 Biedermeiertänze (Biedermeier Dances) four pieces in 3/4 time for large mandolin orchestra (1954)
- Op. 69 Mäander (Meanders) suite for orchestra (1954–5)
- Op. 73 Music for String Orchestra (1957)
- Op. 79 Idyllikon four movements for small orchestra (1958–9)
- Op. 81 Sinfonietta No. 1 for mandolin orchestra, guitar & bass (1961)
- Op. 86 Sinfonietta No. 2 for mandolin orchestra (1966)
- Op. 100 Triptych three movements for orchestra (1970)
- Op. 105 Symphony No. 4, sinfonia concertante for flute, clarinet, violin, cello and orchestra (1974)
- Promenadenmusik for military band (1926)
- Capriccio for mandolin orchestra (1973)
- Hugo Wolf: Corregidor, Suite for orchestra, arranged by Hans Gál

=== Concertos ===
- Op. 39 Concerto for Violin and small orchestra (1932)
- Op. 43 Concertino for Piano and string orchestra (1934)
- Op. 52 Concertino for Violin and string orchestra (1939)
- Op. 55 Concertino for Organ and string orchestra (1948)
- Op. 57 Concerto for Piano and orchestra (1948)
- Op. 67 Concerto for Cello and orchestra (1944–49)
- Op. 82 Concertino for Treble Recorder/Flute and string quartet
- Op. 87 Concertino for Cello and string orchestra (1966)
- Op. 102a/b Suite for Alto Saxophone/Viola and Piano or Orchestra (1949–50)
- Op. 105 Symphony No. 4 Sinfonia concertante for flute, clarinet, violin, cello and orchestra (1974)

=== Works for solo instrument with or without keyboard ===
- Op. 6 Suite for Cello and Piano (1919)
- Op. 17 Sonata in B♭ minor for Violin and Piano (1920)
- Op. 56 Suite for Violin and Piano (1942)
- Op. 56a Partita for Mandolin and Piano (1935)
- Op. 71 Three Sonatinas for Violin and Piano (1956–7)
- Op. 84 Sonata for Clarinet and Piano (1964)
- Op. 85 Sonata for Oboe and Piano (1965)
- Op. 89 Sonata for Cello and Piano (1953)
- Op. 101 Sonata in A major for Viola and Piano (1941)
- Op. 102a/b Suite for Viola/Alto Saxophone and Piano or Orchestra (1949–50)
- Op. 103 Three Intermezzi for Treble Recorder/Flute and Harpsichord/Piano (1974)
- Op. 109a Sonata for Solo Cello (1982)
- Op. 109b Suite for Solo Cello (1982)
- Sonata in D for Violin and Piano (1933)
- Two Scottish Rhapsodies for Cello and Piano (1960)

=== Chamber music for strings ===
- Op. 10 Five intermezzi for string quartet (1914)
- Op. 16 String Quartet I in F minor (1916)
- Op. 35 String Quartet II in A minor (1929)
- Op. 41 Serenade for Violin, Viola and Cello (1932)
- Op. 60b Improvisation, Variations and Finale on a theme by Mozart for string quartet (1934)
- Op. 90(2) Divertimento for Violin and Cello (1967)
- Op. 90(3) Divertimento for Violin and Viola (1969)
- Op. 95 String Quartet III (1969)
- Op. 99 String Quartet IV (1970)
- Op. 104 Trio in F♯ minor for violin, viola d'amore (viola) and cello (1971)
- Op. 106 String Quintet (1976)

=== Other chamber music ===
- Op. 9 Variationen über eine Wiener Heurigenmelodie (Variations on a Viennese Heurigen melody) for Violin, Cello and Piano (1914)
- Op. 13 Piano Quartet (B♭ major) (1914)
- Op. 18 Piano Trio (E major). For Violin, Cello and Piano (1923)
- Op. 22 Divertimento for Flute, Oboe, two Clarinets, Trumpet, two Horns and Bassoon (1924)
- Op. 49a Little Suite for 2 violins and cello (piano ad lib.) (1947–8)
- Op. 49b Trio for violin (flute, oboe), cello and piano (1949)
- Op. 59a Sonatina for 2 mandolins (1952)
- Op. 59b Suite for 3 mandolins (1952)
- Op. 60 Improvisation, Variations and Finale on a theme by Mozart for mandolin, violin, viola and liuto (1934)
- Op. 68a Suite for recorder and violin (1964–5)
- Op. 68b Six two-part inventions for descant and treble recorder (1957)
- Op. 68c Divertimento for 2 treble recorders and guitar (1957)
- Op. 78 Quartettino for recorder quartet (2 descant, treble (or tenor), tenor (or bass)) (1960)
- Op. 80 Divertimento for mandolin with harp or piano (1957)
- Op. 80b Divertimento for flute, viola and harp. (1967)
- Op. 82 Concertino for treble recorder (flute) and string quartet (1961)
- Op. 88 Trio-Serenade for treble recorder/flute, violin and cello (1966)
- Op. 90(1) Divertimento for bassoon and cello (1958)
- Op. 92 Huyton Suite for flute and 2 violins (1940)
- Op. 93 Serenade for clarinet, violin and cello (1935)
- Op. 94 Trio for oboe, violin and viola (1941)
- Op. 96 Sonata for two violins and piano (1941)
- Op. 97 Trio for violin, clarinet and piano (1950)
- Op. 98 Divertimento for three recorders (1970)
- Op. 107 Quintet for clarinet and string quartet (1977)
- Quartet in A for violin, viola, violoncello and piano (left hand) for Paul Wittgenstein (1926)

=== Vocal works – solo voice ===
- Op. 21 Zwei geistliche Gesänge (Two sacred songs) for soprano, organ and viola da gamba or cello (1923)
- Op. 33 Five songs for middle voice and piano (or harp nos. 4 & 5) (1917–21)
- Op. 44 Nachtmusik (Night Music) for soprano solo, male voices (TTBB), flute, cello and piano (Grimmelshausen) (1933)

=== Vocal works – mixed voices ===
- Op. 19 Motette (Motet) for mixed choir (SSAATTBB) a cappella (1914)
- Op. 26 Requiem for Mignon for baritone, 2 choirs (SA, SATB), organ and orchestra (1922)
- Op. 27 Epigrams 5 madrigals for mixed choir (8 parts) a cappella (1926)
- Op. 37 Drei Gesänge (Three songs) for mixed choir a cappella (1929–30)
- Op. 50 De Profundis cantata to German barock poems, for four soloists (SATB), mixed choir and orchestra (1936–7)
- Op. 51 Four Madrigals to Elizabethan poems for mixed choir (SATB) a cappella (Nos.1, 2, 3 also for female choir a cappella Op. 51a) (1939)
- Op. 61 Four part-songs for mixed choir a cappella (1953)
- Op. 70 Lebenskreise (Life Cycles). Symphonic cantata to poems by Hölderlin and Goethe, for 4 soloists, mixed choir and orchestra (1955)
- Four British folk-songs arr. for mixed choir (SATB) a cappella (English/German)

=== Vocal works – female choir ===
- Op. 1 Von ewiger Freude (Of Eternal Joy) cantata for four female voices and double female choir, with organ and two harps (1912)
- Op. 2 Vom Bäumlein, das andere Blätter hat gewollt (The Tree that Wanted Different Leaves) (Friedrich Rückert) for alto solo, six-part female choir and small orchestra (1916)
- Op. 5 Phantasien (Fantasies): three songs to poems by Rabindranath Tagore for alto solo, female choir, clarinet, horn, harp (piano) and string quartet (string orchestra) (1919)
- Op. 12 Three Songs for 3- and 4-part women's choir with Piano (1910–13)
- Op. 25 Herbstlieder (Autumn Songs) five songs for 4-part women's choir (SSAA) a cappella (1918–25)
- Op. 31 Three Songs to poems by R.M.Rilke for three female voices or 3-part women's choir with piano (1928)
- Op. 47 Summer Idylls (Stille Lieder) four songs for women's choir a cappella (1935)
- Op. 75 Jugendlieder (Songs of Youth) five songs for female voices a cappella (1959)
- Op. 76 A Clarion Call for double female choir a cappella (1959)
- Op. 77 Of a Summer Day lyrical suite for 3-part female choir with (mezzo)soprano solo and string orchestra (1951)

=== Vocal works – male choir ===
- Op. 11 Three Songs for 3- and 4-part Male-Voice Choir with piano (or small orchestra) (1910–11)
- Op. 34 Drei Porträtstudien (Three Portrait Studies). (Wilhelm Busch). For 4-part male voice choir with piano (1929)
- Op. 40 Three Idylls (Wilhelm Busch). For 4-part male-voice choir (TTBB) with piano (1934)
- Op. 44 Nachtmusik (Night Music). (Grimmelshausen). For soprano solo, male voices (TTBB), flute, cello and piano (1933)
- Op. 63 Two songs for 4-part male-voice choir a cappella (1954)
- Op. 72 Satirikon four aphorisms for 4 male voices (TTBB) a cappella (1937–58)
- Op. 91 Spätlese six songs for male-voice choir (TTBB) a cappella (1966/67)
- Drei deutsche Volkslieder (Three German folksongs) arr. for male-voice choir (TTBB) a cappella

=== Keyboard works ===
- Op. 3 Serbische Weisen (Serbian Dances) for piano duet (4 hands) (1916)
- Op. 7 Drei Skizzen (Three sketches) for piano (1910–11)
- Op. 24 Suite for piano (1922)
- Op. 28 Sonata for piano (1927)
- Op. 29 Toccata for organ (1928)
- Op. 43 Concertino for piano and string orchestra (1934)
- Op. 55 Concertino for organ and string orchestra (1948)
- Op. 57 Concerto for piano and orchestra (1948)
- Op. 58 Two Sonatinas for piano (1951, 1949)
- Op. 64 Three Small Pieces for piano (1933)
- Op. 65 Three Preludes for piano (1944)
- Op. 74 Drei Marionetten (Three Marionettes)
- Op. 83 Twenty-four Preludes for piano (1960)
- Op. 108 Twenty-four Fugues for piano (1979–80)
- A Pastoral Tune for piano (6 hands) (1953–54)
- Kleine Suite (Little Suite) for harpsichord or piano (1962)
- Phantasia, Arioso and Capriccio for organ
- Prelude and Fugue in A♭ for organ
- Three Impromptus for two pianos (1940)

=== Works for recorder ===
- Op. 68a Suite for recorder and violin (1954–5)
- Op. 68b Six two-part inventions for descant and treble recorder (1957)
- Op. 68c Divertimento for 2 treble recorders and guitar (1957)
- Op. 78 Quartettino for recorder quartet: 2 descant, treble (or tenor), tenor (or bass) (1960)
- Op. 82 Concertino for treble recorder/flute and string quartet (string orchestra or piano) (1961)
- Op. 88 Trio-Serenade for treble recorder/flute, violin and cello (1966)
- Op. 98 Divertimento for 3 recorders (descant, treble and tenor) (1970)
- Op. 103 Three Intermezzi for treble recorder/flute and harpsichord or piano (1974)
- Op. 110a Four Bagatelles for treble recorder solo (1983)
- Intrata Giocosa for descant, treble and tenor recorders, two violins and cello (double bass ad lib) (1958

=== Works for mandolin ===
- Op. 56a Partita for mandolin and piano (1935)
- Op. 59a Sonatina for 2 mandolins (1952)
- Op. 59b Suite for 3 mandolins (1952)
- Op. 60 Improvisation, Variations and Finale on a theme by Mozart For mandolin, violin, viola and liuto (1934)
- Op. 66 Biedermeiertänze (Biedermeier Dances). Four pieces in 3/4 time for large mandolin orchestra (1954)
- Op. 80 Divertimento for mandolin and harp (1967)
- Op. 81 Sinfonietta No. 1 for mandolin orchestra, guitar & bass (1961)
- Op. 86 Sinfonietta No. 2 (E minor) for mandolin orchestra. (1966)
- Capriccio for mandolin orchestra (1973)
- Lyrical Suite for soprano solo, flute and string quartet (flute, mandolin and string trio) to Browning's Pippa Passes (1934)

== Recordings ==
Since the early 2000s, Gál's music has started to be recorded on a significant scale. Recordings made during this period include a set of the four symphonies on the Avie label, under conductors Kenneth Woods and Thomas Zehetmair, as well as recordings of concertos and chamber music.

- 24 Preludes for Piano op. 83, Aladár Rácz. Pan Classics PC510141, 2001
- Chamber Music for Clarinet (Clarinet Quintet op. 107, Trio for Violin, Clarinet and Piano, op. 97, Serenade for Clarinet, Violin and Cello, op. 93). Shelley Levy, Ensemble Burletta, Toccata TOCC0377, 2016
- Chamber Music, Volume Three (Piano Quartet in B-flat major, op. 13, Three Sonatinas for violin and piano, op. 71, Sonatina in F major). Cressida Nash, Katalin Kertész, Nichola Blakey, Sarah Beth Briggs, Toccata TOCC0433, 2018
- Complete Piano Duos Anthony Goldstone and Caroline Clemmow (Three marionettes op. 74, Serbische Weisen op. 3, Concertino op. 43, Three Impromptus, A Pastoral Tune). Divine Art DDA25098, 2012
- Complete String Quartets (Quartet No. 1 in F minor op. 16, Quartet No. 4 op. 99, Quartet no. 2 op 35, Quartet no. 3 op. 95, 5 Intermezzi op. 10, Improvisation, Variations and Finale on a theme by Mozart op. 60b). Edinburgh Quartet, Meridian Records CDE 84530/1, 2005/2007
- Complete Works for Solo Piano; Leon McCawley (Three Sketches op. 7, Suite op. 24, Sonata op. 28, Two Sonatinas op. 58, Three Small Pieces op. 64, Three Preludes op. 65, Twenty-four Preludes op. 83, Twenty-four Fugues op. 108). Avie AV2064, 2005
- Concertinos, for piano and strings (op. 43); for violin and strings (op. 52); for cello and strings (op. 87); Serenade for Strings (op. 46). Nina Karmon (violin), Justus Grimm (cello), Oliver Triendl (piano), Sinfonietta Riga/Normunds Šnē. Hännsler Classic HC23049, 2024
- Das Lied der Nacht, op. 23, Opernchor des Theaters Osnabrüc, cond. Andreas Hotz. CPO 555 186-2 (2018)
- Hans Gál & Edward Elgar: Cello Concertos (Gál: Cello Concerto, op. 67; Elgar: Cello Concerto) Antônio Meneses, cello; Northern Sinfonia, Claudio Cruz; Avie AV2237, 2012
- Hans Gál & Franz Schubert: Kindred Spirits (Gál: Symphony No. 1, op. 30; Schubert: Symphony No. 6 in C) Northern Sinfonia / Thomas Zehetmair; Avie AV2224, 2011
- Hans Gál & Franz Schubert: Kindred Spirits (Gál: Symphony No. 2, op. 53; Schubert: Symphony No. 9 (The Great)) Northern Sinfonia / Thomas Zehetmair; Avie AV2225, 2011
- Hans Gál & Hans Krása: Complete String Trios Ensemble Epomeo (Gál: Serenade op. 41 for violin, viola and cello; Gál:Trio in F-sharp minor op. 104 for violin, viola and cello; Krása: Tanec (Dance) for violin, viola and cello; Krása: Passacaglia and Fuga for violin, viola and cello), Avie AV2259, 2012
- Hans Gál & Robert Schumann (Gál: Symphony No. 1, op. 30; Schumann: Symphony No. 3) Orchestra of the Swan, Kenneth Woods; Avie AV2233, 2014
- Hans Gál & Robert Schumann (Gál: Symphony No. 2, op. 53; Schumann: Symphony No. 3 Rhenish) Orchestra of the Swan, Kenneth Woods; Avie AV2232, 2013
- Hans Gál & Robert Schumann (Gál: Symphony No. 3, op. 62; Schumann: Symphony No. 3 Rhenish) Orchestra of the Swan, Kenneth Woods; Avie AV2230, 2011
- Hans Gál & Robert Schumann (Gál: Symphony No. 4, op. 105 (Sinfonia concertante); Schumann: Symphony No. 2, op. 61) Orchestra of the Swan, Kenneth Woods; Avie AV2231, 2012
- Hans Gál & Wolfgang Amadeus Mozart (Gál Concerto for Piano and Orchestra op. 57; Mozart Piano Concerto No. 22 in E-flat, K. 482) Sarah Beth Briggs (piano) Royal Northern Sinfonia, Kenneth Woods; Avie AV2358, 2016
- Hans Gal, Joseph Kaminski and Leonard Bernstein: Works for Violin and Orchestra. (includes Gal's Concertino for violin and string orchestra, op. 52). Erez Ofer (violin) Berlin Radio Symphony Orchestra, Frank Beermann. Hanssler Classics HC19020, 2019.
- Modern Times (Songs by Franz Schreker, Hans Gál, Berthold Goldschmidt, Hanns Eisler, Erich Korngold, Alexander von Zemlinsky and Wilhelm Grosz) includes Gál Five Songs (op. 33); Christian Immler (baritone), Helmut Deutsch (piano); C-Avi-Music 8553229, 2011
- Music for Cello (Sonata for Solo Cello op. 109a; Suite for Solo Cello op. 109b; Sonata for Cello and Piano op. 89) Alfia Nakipbekova (cello), Jakob Fichert (piano); Toccata Classics TOCC0043, 2012
- Music for Viola (Suite Concertante for Viola and Orchestra, op. 102a, Divertimento for Violin and Viola, op. 90, No. 3, Sonata for Viola and Piano, op. 101, Trio for Oboe, Violin and Viola, Op. 94, Hanna Pakkala, Ostrobothnian Chamber Orchestra, Toccata TOCC0535, 2019
- Music for Voices, Volumes 1, 2 and 3. (includes Motette, op. 19, Epigramme, op. 27, Drei Lieder, op. 31, Drei Porträtstudien, op. 34, Four Madrigals, op. 51, Songs of Youth, op. 75, Satirikon, op. 77, Spätlese, op. 91, Four Part-Songs, op. 61, Of a Summer Day, op. 77. Toccata TOCC0509 (2020), TOCC0644 (2023) and TOCC0751 (2026).
- Orgelwerke/Organ Works (Concertino for organ op. 55, Toccata op. 29, 2 Sacred Songs op. 21, Prelude & Fugue, Phantasia Arioso & Capriccioso) István Mátyás (organ), Adrineh Simonian (soprano), David Pennetzdorfer (cello), Orchester Wiener Akadenie/Martin Haselböck; Membran NCA 60162, 2007
- Piano Trios (Piano Trio in E Major, op. 18; Variations on a Heurigen Melody, op.9; Piano Trio in G Major, op. 49b) Doris Adam (piano), Karin Adam (violin), Christoph Stradner (cello); Camerata (Japan) CMCD-28149, 2008
- The Right Tempo (Three Intermezzos for Flute and Piano, op. 103; Sonata for Two Violins and Piano, op. 96, Three Sketches for Piano, op. 7, Huyton Suite for Flute and Two Violins, op. 92) Ulrike Anton (flute), Russell Ryan (piano), Cornelia Löscher (violin), Wolfhart Schuster (violin); Gramola (Vienna) 98896, 2010
- Through the Centuries (includes Gál's Divertimento for Violin and Viola op. 90 no. 3) Annette-Barbara Vogel (violin), Daniel Sweaney (viola) Blue Green Recording BGR269, 2013
- Violin Concerto, Violin Concertino, Triptych for Orchestra (Gál: Concerto for violin & small orchestra, op. 39; Gál: Triptych: Three movements for orchestra, op. 100; Gál: Concertino for violin and string orchestra, op. 52) Annette-Barbara Vogel (violin), Northern Sinfonia/Kenneth Woods; Avie AV2146, 2010
- Violin Concerto & Violin Sonatas (Concerto for violin and small orchestra, op. 39, Sonata for Violin and Piano, op. 17, Sonata for Violin and Piano in D (1933)) Thomas Albertus Irnberger (violin), Evgeni Sinaiski (piano); Israel Chamber Orchestra, Roberto Paternostro; Gramola (Vienna) 98921, 2011
- Works for Violin and Piano (Sonata in B-flat minor, op. 17 (1920); Suite in G major op. 56 (1942); Sonata in D, op. posth. (1933)) Annette-Barbara Vogel (violin), Juhani Lagerspetz (piano); Avie AV2182, 2010

== See also ==
- List of émigré composers in Britain
