= Night Song =

Night Song(s) or Nightsong(s) may refer to:

== Film and television ==
- Night Song (1948 film), an American drama film directed by John Cromwell
- Night Song (2016 film), a French-Canadian film directed by Raphaël Nadjari
- Nightsongs (1984 film), a film by Marva Nabili
- Nightsongs, a 2003 film adaptation of Jon Fosse's play (see below), directed by Romuald Karmakar
- "Nightsong", an episode of The Twilight Zone
- "Night Song", an episode of Follow the Sun
- Nightsongs, a 1985 American Playhouse production

== Literature ==
- Night Song, a 1961 novel by John A. Williams
- Night Song, a 1994 novel by Beverly Jenkins
- Night Songs, a 1984 novel by Charles L. Grant
- Nightsong, a 1986 novel by Valerie Sherwood
- Nightsong, a 2012 book by Ari Berk
- Nightsongs (play) (Natta syng sine songar), a 1997 play by Jon Fosse

== Music ==
=== Classical ===
- "Nachtlied" (lit. "Nightsong"), a song by Carl Loewe
- Night Song, for orchestra by Wayne Barlow, 1956
- "Night Song", a musical setting of a poem by Langston Hughes, by Howard Swanson
- "A Night Song", a song by Charles Ives
- Night Songs, a composition by David Dubery
- Night Songs, three songs by Alec Roth
- Night Songs, four songs by Madeleine Dring, 1976
- Night Songs, for orchestra by Helen Grime, 2012
- Nightsongs I, for violin and piano by Arlene Zallman, 1984

=== Albums ===
- Night Song (Ahmad Jamal album), 1980
- Night Song (Al Grey album), 1963
- Night Song (Arthur Blythe album) or the title song, 1997
- Night Song (Kenny Burrell album), 1969
- Night Song (Ketil Bjørnstad and Svante Henryson album) or the title song, 2011
- Night Song (Mike LeDonne album), 2005
- Night Song (Nusrat Fateh Ali Khan album) or the title song, 1996
- Night Song, by Mighty Clouds of Joy, 1989
- Night Songs (Cinderella album) or the title song, 1986
- Night Songs (Barry Manilow album) 2014
- Night Songs, by Janis Siegel, 2013
- Night Songs, by Jonathan Kreisberg, 2009
- Night Songs, by Renée Fleming, 2001
- Nightsong, by the King's Singers, 1997
- Nightsong, by Sidsel Endresen and Bugge Wesseltoft, 1994
- Nightsongs (Earl Klugh album) or the title song, "Night Song", 1984
- Nightsongs (Stars album), 2001
- Nightsongs, by Yael Naim, 2020

=== Songs ===
- "Night Song", written by Lee Adams and Charles Strouse for the musical Golden Boy, 1964; recorded by many performers
- "Night Song", by Crosby, Stills, Nash & Young from American Dream, 1988

== See also ==
- Lullaby
- Nocturne
- Song of the Night (disambiguation)
