= English Symphony Orchestra =

British professional orchestra in Worcester

English String Orchestra and English Symphony Orchestra
- Classical orchestra
- Short name: ESO
- Founded: 1978
- Location: Worcester, Worcestershire
- Principal conductor: Kenneth Woods
- Website: www.eso.co.uk

The English Symphony Orchestra and the English String Orchestra (collectively abbreviated as ESO) are two iterations of a British professional orchestra based in the city of Worcester, Worcestershire, in the West Midlands of England.

== History ==
Founded in 1978 as the English String Orchestra by conductor William Boughton, the orchestra was first based in Malvern and quickly established a reputation for its performances of music in the English Romantic and national styles prevalent in the early decades of the 20th century. Over time, the English String Orchestra's embrace of larger works, especially those requiring woodwind, brass or percussion, caused its adoption of the name English Symphony Orchestra to reflect its often augmented instrumentation.

Partnerships with other British or British-based musicians of great renown, including Nigel Kennedy, Steven Isserlis, Daniel Hope and John Lill helped bring the orchestra national recognition.

The orchestra came to international attention throughout the 1980s and 1990s in large part due to their series of recordings for Nimbus Records, in particular, their advocacy for the works of early- and mid- 20th-century British music by composers like Arnold Bax, Frank Bridge, George Butterworth, John Ireland, Gerald Finzi and Lennox Berkeley as well as more mainstream figures like Benjamin Britten, Edward Elgar and Ralph Vaughan Williams. The ESO continue to record for Nimbus but also work with the Naxos, Avie, Somm, Toccata and Signum record labels.

Yehudi Menuhin served as the orchestra's principal guest conductor from 1991 until his death in 1999. Boughton stood down as artistic director in 2006. Vernon Handley became principal conductor in 2007, and held the post until his death in 2008. In 2012. the ESO named Kenneth Woods as director of its Malvern concert series. He became principal conductor in 2013. In 2016, his remit was expanded to artistic director. During Woods' tenure, the ESO has extended its longstanding commitment to British music to include a major commitment to 21st Century British music. In addition to its own active commissioning programme, the ESO work closely with soloists, festivals and record labels to develop co-commissioning projects. In 2017, the ESO launched the 21st Century Symphony Project, an effort to reinvigorate the modern symphonic repertoire by commissioning, premiering and recording nine symphonies by nine leading composers. The project began with the premiere of Philip Sawyers' Third Symphony in 2017 and continues in 2018 with the premieres of David Matthews' Ninth Symphony and Matthew Taylor's Fifth Symphony.

The orchestra has also promoted the music of composers whose music was suppressed by the Nazis before and during World War II, to include performances and recordings of works by Ernst Krenek, Hans Gál, Michael Tippett and Viktor Ullmann.

The ESO was one of the first orchestras in the UK to return to working safely during the COVID-19 lockdown in 2020, and developed an online series of pre-recorded concerts in partnership with Wyastone Concert Hall which are shared on their ESO Digital platform.

Adrian Williams is the orchestra's current John McCabe Composer-in-Association. Philip Sawyers, the prior composer-in-association, has the title of composer laureate with the ESO. April Frederick is the current artist-in-residence of the ESO. The ESO's current leader is Zoe Beyers. In August 2020, Andrew Farquharson was appointed as the first chief executive officer of the ESO.

== Conductors in leadership posts ==
- William Boughton (artistic director, 1980–2006)
- Vernon Handley (principal conductor, 2007–2008)
- Kenneth Woods (artistic director, 2013–present)

== Premieres and commissions ==
- Nimrod Borenstein: Concerto for Piano, Trumpet and Strings, Op. 74 (world premiere performance and recording)
- Emily Doolittle: falling still, for violin and strings (UK premiere); green/blue (UK premiere)
- Steve Elcock: Wreck, for Symphony Orchestra (World premiere)
- Robert Fokkens: An Eventful Morning in London, Concerto for Violin and Chamber Orchestra (world premiere recording)
- Geoffrey Gordon: Saint Blue, Concerto for Piano, Trumpet and Strings (ESO commission, world premiere performance and recording)
- Jesse Jones: Smith Square Dances (Co-commission with St John's Smith square, world premiere performance)
- John Joubert: Jane Eyre, opera (world premiere performance and recording)
- David Matthews: Romanza for violin and strings (world premiere recording)
- Paul Patterson: Allusions, concerto for two violins and strings
- Deborah Pritchard:
  - Seven Halts on the Somme, concerto for trumpet, harp and strings (world premiere recording)
  - Wall of Water, concerto for violin and strings (ESO commission, world premiere performance and recording)
- Kaija Saariaho: Terra memoria (UK premiere)
- Robert Saxton: The Resurrection of the Soldiers (Co-commission/co-premiere with Presteigne Festival)
- Philip Sawyers:
  - Concerto for Trumpet, Strings and Timpani (world premiere performance and recording)
  - Concerto for Violin and Orchestra (ESO commission, world premiere performance and recording)
  - Elegiac Rhapsody for Trumpet and Strings in Memory of John McCabe (world premiere performance and recording)
  - Fanfare (ESO commission, world premiere performance and recording)
  - Songs of Loss and Regret(world premiere performance and recording)
  - Symphony No. 3 (ESO commission, world premiere performance and recording)
  - The Valley of Vision, tone poem for orchestra (ESO commission, world premiere performance and recording)
- Kenneth Woods: The Ugly Duckling for narrator and orchestra (ESO commission, world premiere performance)
- Toby Young: The Art of Dancing, suite for trumpet, piano and strings (world premiere recording)

== New arrangements ==
- Brahms arr. Kenneth Woods: Piano Quartet No. 2 in A major, arr. for Symphony Orchestra (world premiere performance and recording)
- Elgar, arr. Donald Fraser:
  - Piano Quintet arr. for symphony orchestra (world premiere performance and recording)
  - Sea Pictures, version for choir and strings (world premiere)
- Viktor Ullmann arr. Kenneth Woods: Chamber Symphony, arr. of String Quartet No. 3 for string orchestra (UK premiere)

== Selected recordings ==
- Hans Gál: Concertino for Cello and Strings (world premiere recording)
- Ernst Krenek:
  - Concerto for Two Pianos (world premiere recording)
  - Double Concerto for Violin, Piano and Orchestra (world premiere recording)
  - Piano Concertos Nos. 1–4 (world premiere recordings)
