= George Szell =

Classical conductor and composer (1897–1970)

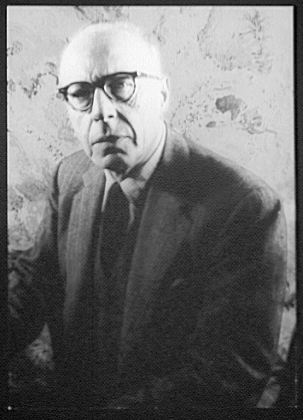
George Szell, 1954

George Szell (/ˈsɛl/; June 7, 1897 – July 30, 1970), originally György Széll, György Endre Széll, or Georg Szell, (Note: Sources differ on Szell's birthname or "real" name. Slonimsky & Kuhn 2001, for example, begins its entry, "Szell, George (actually, 'György') ...", and Charry 2011 gives his birth name as 'György Endre Szél'. This form would seem consistent with Szell's Hungarian origins. However, both Charry 2001 and Rosenberg 2000 fail to cite the name 'György' at all, mentioning instead the more Germanic 'Georg', which would seem appropriate in Szell's childhood home of Vienna. Rosenberg goes so far as to say, "[h]e was born Georg Szell on June 7, 1897, in Budapest ..." (p. 237, emphasis added). Sources agree, however, that in later life (at least after coming to America) Szell went by the Anglicised 'George' and that is the name credited on his extant recordings.) was an Austro-Hungarian-born American conductor, composer, and pianist. Considered one of the twentieth century's greatest conductors, he was music director of the Cleveland Orchestra of Cleveland, Ohio, and recorded much of the standard classical repertoire in Cleveland and with other orchestras.

Szell came to Cleveland in 1946 to take over its respected if undersized orchestra, which was struggling to recover from the disruptions of World War II. By the time of his death he was credited, to quote the critic Donal Henahan, with having built it into "what many critics regarded as the world's keenest symphonic instrument."

Through his recordings, Szell has remained a presence in the classical music world long after his death, and his name remains synonymous with that of the Cleveland Orchestra. While on tour with the orchestra in the late 1980s, then-music director Christoph von Dohnányi remarked, "We give a great concert, and George Szell gets a great review."

== Life and career ==
=== Early life ===
György Endre Széll was born in Budapest but grew up in Vienna. His family was of Jewish origin but converted to Catholicism. As a young boy he was taken regularly to Mass.

=== Early career ===
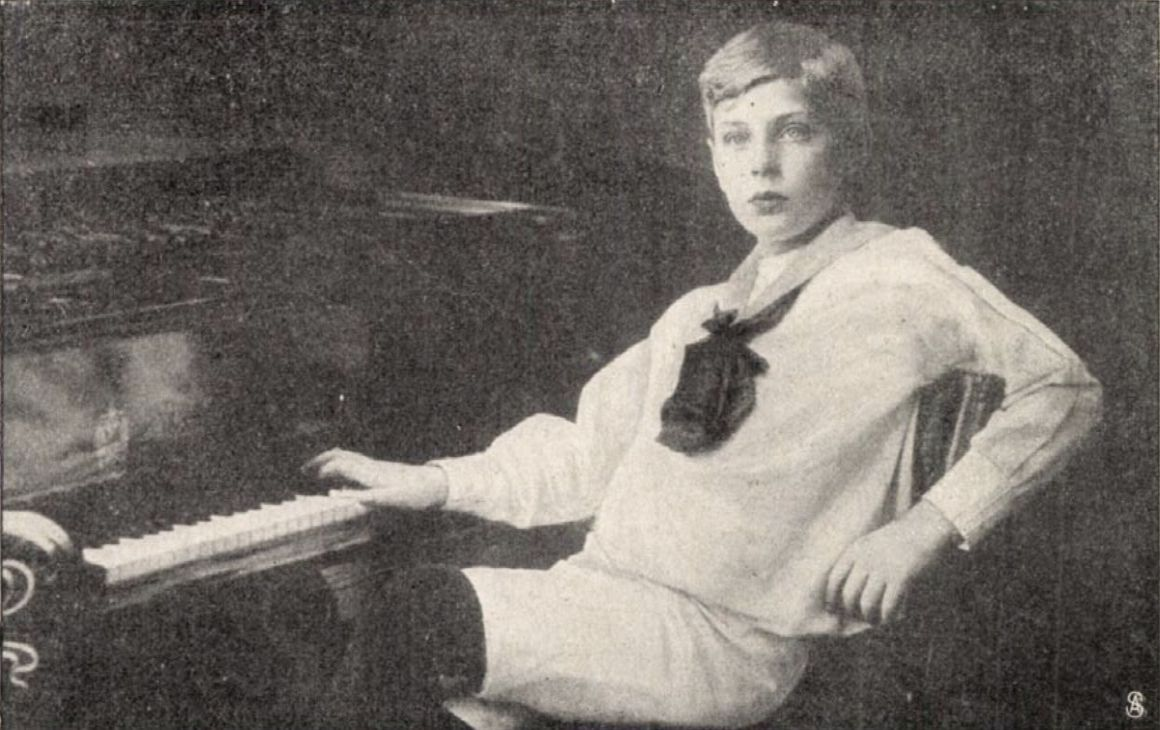
George Szell at the age of 12

Szell began his formal music training as a pianist, studying with Richard Robert. One of Robert's other students was Rudolf Serkin; Szell and Serkin became lifelong friends and musical collaborators.

At the age of eleven, he began touring Europe as a pianist and composer, making his London debut at that age. Newspapers declared him "the next Mozart". Throughout his teenage years he performed with orchestras in this dual role, eventually making appearances as composer, pianist and conductor, as he did with the Berlin Philharmonic at age seventeen.

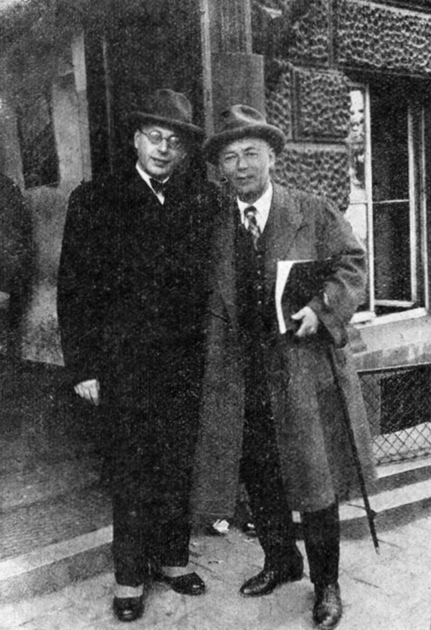
George Szell and composer Jaroslav Křička during the staging of Křička's opera The Gentleman in White in Prague, April 1932

Szell quickly realized that he was never going to make a career out of being a composer or pianist and that he much preferred the artistic control he could achieve as a conductor. He made an unplanned public conducting debut when he was seventeen, while vacationing with his family at a summer resort. The Vienna Symphony's conductor had injured his arm, and Szell was asked to substitute. Szell quickly turned to conducting full-time. Though he abandoned composing, throughout the rest of his life he occasionally played the piano with chamber ensembles and as an accompanist. Despite his rare appearances as a pianist after his teens, he remained in good form. During his Cleveland years he occasionally would demonstrate to guest pianists how he thought they should play a certain passage.

In 1915, at the age of 18, Szell won an appointment with Berlin's Royal Court Opera (now known as the Staatsoper). There, he was befriended by its music director, Richard Strauss. Strauss instantly recognized Szell's talent and was particularly impressed with how well the teenager conducted Strauss's music. Strauss once said that he could die a happy man knowing that there was someone who performed his music so perfectly. In fact, Szell ended up conducting part of the world premiere recording of Don Juan for Strauss. The composer had arranged for Szell to rehearse the orchestra for him, but having overslept, showed up an hour late to the recording session. Since the recording session was already paid for, and only Szell was there, Szell conducted the first half of the recording (since no more than four minutes of music could fit onto one side of a 78, the music was broken up into four sections). Strauss arrived as Szell was finishing conducting the second part; he exclaimed that what he heard was so good that it could go out under his own name. Strauss went on to record the last two parts, leaving the Szell-conducted half as part of the full world premiere recording of Don Juan.

Szell credited Strauss as being a major influence on his conducting style. Much of Szell's baton technique, the Cleveland Orchestra's lean, transparent sound and Szell's willingness to be an orchestra builder, were influenced by Strauss. The two remained friends after Szell left the Royal Court Opera in 1919; even after World War II, when Szell had settled in the United States, Strauss kept track of how his protégé was doing.

In the fifteen years during and after World War I, Szell worked with opera houses and orchestras in Europe: in Berlin, Strasbourg – where he succeeded Otto Klemperer at the Municipal Theatre – Prague, Darmstadt, and Düsseldorf, before becoming principal conductor, in 1924, of the Berlin State Opera, which had replaced the Royal Opera. In 1923 he conducted the premiere of Hans Gál's opera Die heilige Ente in Düsseldorf. He was engaged as first Kapellmeister at the Berlin State Opera from 1924 to 1929. At the same time, he directed the Berlin Radio Symphony Orchestra and taught at the Berlin Academy of Music (from 1927 to 1930), making recordings with the Vienna Philharmonic.

From 1936 to 1939, he led the Scottish National Orchestra and, from 1937 to 1939, the Resident Orchestra of The Hague. In 1939, Szell returned to Prague as general music director and director of the Prague State Opera. The Prague Masonic Grand Lodge "Lessing of the Three Rings" lists him as a member under the name "Georg Szell".

=== Move to the U.S. ===
At the outbreak of war in Europe in 1939, Szell was returning via the U.S. from an Australian tour and ended up settling with his family in New York City. From 1940 to 1945 he taught composition, orchestration, and music theory at the Mannes College of Music in Manhattan; his composition students at Mannes included George Rochberg and Ursula Mamlok. He made his Metropolitan Opera debut in 1942; he conducted the orchestra regularly for the next four years. In 1946, Szell became a naturalized U. S. citizen.

=== The Cleveland Orchestra: 1946 to 1970 ===
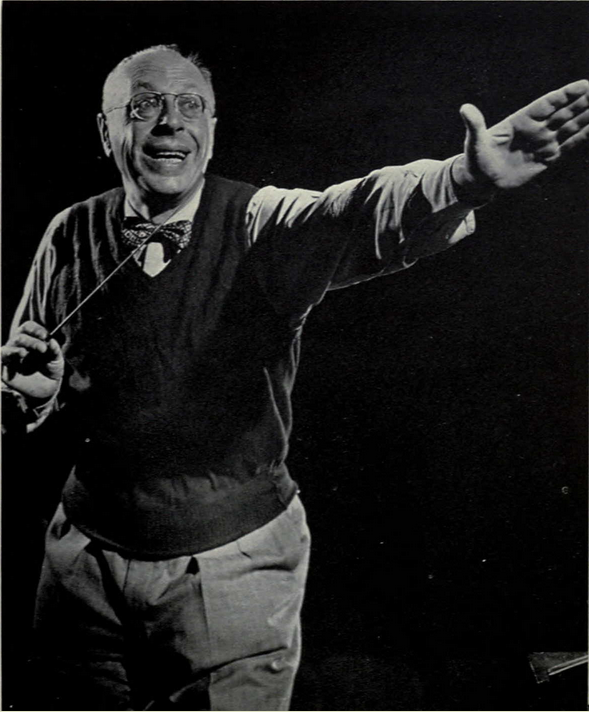
Szell at University of Michigan, c. 1956

"A new leaf will be turned over with a bang!" said Szell, who was named music director and conductor of the Cleveland Orchestra in January 1946. "People talk about the New York, the Boston, and the Philadelphia. Now they will talk about the New York, the Boston, the Philadelphia, and the Cleveland." However, Szell's time in Cleveland began during a period of unrest and uncertainty. The orchestra's previous music director, Erich Leinsdorf, had temporarily vacated his post after being drafted into the armed forces. During Leinsdorf's absence, Szell made his Severance Hall debut — in November 1944 — to glowing reviews. And despite Leinsdorf's impending return, public opinion shifted toward Szell. Following intense negotiations that included granting Szell complete artistic control over personnel, programming, scheduling, and recording, the orchestra's board of trustees appointed him the ensemble's fourth music director.

Shortly after accepting the position, Szell remarked that he would "dedicate all [his] efforts...to make The Cleveland Orchestra second to none in quality of performance." He devoted much of his energy to exacting his will on his musicians — releasing some and hiring others in an effort to achieve his desired sound. He expected technical perfection and total commitment from musicians during rehearsals and performances. His standards were stringent, his goals lofty: He was singularly focused on elevating the orchestra to new levels of excellence.

Not long into his tenure, Szell began making guest appearances in other cities, especially New York, and Cleveland steadily gained a reputation as one of the world's leading ensembles. By the early 1950s, he had grown concerned about "dry" acoustics at Severance Hall — an issue that had preoccupied him since his arrival in Cleveland. "I only wish you had a hall with acoustics worthy of your great art", said Leopold Stokowski, former conductor of the Philadelphia Orchestra. "In the hall the music was dry and half dead-sounding." Although plywood was later added to the hall, further changes were still required to achieve Szell's desired tone.

As early as the 1955–56 season, Szell recognized the need for an outdoor venue at which the orchestra would host summer concerts and programs. During the preceding years, summer attendance for orchestra performances at Cleveland's Public Auditorium had waned and, among the adjustments made to provide employment for the musicians, a series of concerts was played before Cleveland Indians baseball games. Around the same time, Szell determined that the orchestra needed to embark on its first international tour if it hoped to keep pace with other major symphonies. As a result, the orchestra traveled to Europe in the spring of 1957, with stops in Antwerp, Brussels, and behind the Iron Curtain. The tour was a success, bringing the orchestra worldwide acclaim and instilling a sense of pride in the citizens of Cleveland.

The next decade or so was a busy and fruitful time for Szell and the orchestra. By the 1958–59 season, acoustic renovations had been completed on a new stage — the Szell Shell — that surrounded the musicians and projected their tone in a different way, eliminating "dryness" and providing clearer-sounding strings. In July 1968, the orchestra opened its new summer home, Blossom Music Center, about 25 miles south of Cleveland, providing Szell and his musicians with year-round employment. Two years later, in May 1970, the orchestra continued to advance its reputation internationally by touring to the Far East, including stops in Japan and Korea.

However, Szell's health began to deteriorate. During a concert in Anchorage, Alaska, Szell ceased conducting momentarily and, as cellist Michael Haber recalled, "I felt a chill through my body...I remember thinking something was terribly wrong." Indeed, something was wrong: This was Szell's final performance, and he died on July 30, 1970.

== Conducting style ==
Szell's manner in rehearsal was that of an autocratic taskmaster. He meticulously prepared for rehearsals and could play the entire score on the piano from memory. Preoccupied with phrasing, transparency, balance and architecture, Szell also insisted upon hitherto unheard-of rhythmic discipline from his players. The result was often a level of precision and ensemble playing normally found only in the best string quartets. For all Szell's absolutist methods, many of the orchestra's players were proud of the musical integrity to which he aspired. Video footage also shows that Szell took care to explain what he wanted and why, expressed delight when the orchestra produced what he was aiming for, and avoided over-rehearsing parts that were in good shape. His left hand, which he used to shape each sound, was often called the most graceful in music.

As a result of Szell's exactitude and very thorough rehearsals, some critics (such as Donald Vroon, editor of American Record Guide) have censured Szell's music-making as lacking emotion. In response to such criticism, Szell expressed this credo: "The borderline is very thin between clarity and coolness, self-discipline and severity. There exist different nuances of warmth – from the chaste warmth of Mozart to the sensuous warmth of Tchaikovsky, from the noble passion of Fidelio to the lascivious passion of Salome. I cannot pour chocolate sauce over asparagus." He further stated: "It is perfectly legitimate to prefer the hectic, the arhythmic, the untidy. But to my mind, great artistry is not disorderliness."

He has been described as a "literalist", playing only what is in the score. However, Szell was quite prepared to play music in unconventional ways if he thought the music needed these; and, like most other conductors before and since, he made many small modifications to orchestrations and notes in the works of Beethoven, Schubert and others.

Cloyd Duff, timpanist with the Cleveland Orchestra, once recalled how Szell had insisted that he play the snare drum part in Bartok's Concerto for Orchestra, an instrument which he was not supposed to play. A month after having recorded the concerto in Cleveland (October 1959), it was to be performed at Carnegie Hall, as part of an annual two-week tour of the Eastern United States along with Prokofiev's Symphony No. 5. Szell had begun getting increasingly irritated about the side drum part in the second movement and by the time they reached New York City, Szell's escalation was going off the scale. "Starting with the one who had played on the recording, Szell tried out each of the staff percussionists on the side drum part. He made them so nervous that, one by one, they all stumbled. Finally Szell turned to timpanist Cloyd Duff."

This is the story as Duff tells it:

Szell came to me and said to me, "Cloyd I want you to play the snare drum part. I remember how you played these things in Philadelphia [over twenty years earlier at the Robin Hood Dell when Szell was guest conductor and Duff was a student at Curtis]." He had an awfully good memory, he liked my percussion playing. He said, "I want you to play the part," and I really blew my lid. I said, "You're ruining the whole section. Nobody can make a diminuendo to please you because they're so nervous. Every one of those men is capable of doing that." He said, "Even so, I want you to play the part." I said, "Do you realize how silly that will look, to see me get up from the timpani to go over to the snare drum and then back to the timpani and back to the snare drum at the end?" I said, "It's really uncalled for," or words to that effect. But, he said, "OK, but I want you to play that part. It's very important that we do it just right." I said, "OK, I'll play it for you, but don't you dare look at me." So when I played it, I played it louder than they had played it before so I had more room to make a diminuendo. Everybody was a little bit shocked that I had played it as loudly as I did. But Szell, true to his word, looked away, didn't look at me once and I didn't look at him under the circumstances.

Szell's reputation as a perfectionist was well-known, and his knowledge of instruments was deep. The Cleveland trumpeter Bernard Adelstein recounted Szell's knowledge of the trumpet:

He knew all the fingerings on the trumpet. For example, on the C-trumpet, the "E" on the fourth space is played open, with no valve, and it's a flat note. But there are two other options on the C-trumpet. You can play the same note with the first and second valves or the third valve. Both of them sound sharp. The third valve is a little sharp and the first and second valves together sounds even sharper. And he knew that. He called me in once when we were playing an octave in Don Juan. He said, "The 'E' is a flat note on the C-trumpet." I said, "Yes, that's why I play it on one and two." He said, "But one and two is sharp, isn't it?" I said, "Yes, but I make an adjustment, by lengthening the first slide a little bit." And he said, "Ah, yes, but it's still out of tune."

== Repertoire ==
Szell primarily conducted works from the core Austro-German classical and romantic repertoire, from Haydn, Mozart and Beethoven, through Mendelssohn, Schumann, and Brahms and on to Wagner, Bruckner, Mahler and Strauss. He said once that as he got older he consciously narrowed his repertoire, feeling it was "actually my task to do those works which I thought I'm best qualified to do, and for which a certain tradition is disappearing with the disappearance of the great conductors who were my contemporaries and my idols and my unpaid teachers." He did program contemporary music, however; he gave numerous world premieres in Cleveland, and he was particularly associated with such composers as Dutilleux, Walton, Prokofiev, Hindemith and Bartók. Szell also helped initiate the Cleveland Orchestra's long association with the composer-conductor Pierre Boulez. Szell recorded as a pianist with the Budapest String quartet, and also as a duo with Cleveland Orchestra concertmaster, violinist Rafael Druian, on four sonatas by Mozart.

== Other orchestras ==
After World War II Szell became closely associated with the Concertgebouw Orchestra of Amsterdam, where he was a frequent guest conductor and made a number of recordings. He also regularly appeared with the London Symphony Orchestra, Chicago Symphony Orchestra, the Vienna Philharmonic, and at the Salzburg Festival. From 1942 to 1955, he was an annual guest conductor of the New York Philharmonic and served as Musical Advisor and senior guest conductor of that orchestra in the last year of his life. In 1960 he conducted the Columbia Symphony Orchestra with Robert Casadesus in a recording for Columbia Masterworks of Wolfgang Amadeus Mozart's Piano Concerto No. 22 in E-flat, K. 482, and Mozart's Piano Concerto No. 23 in A major, K. 488 (ML 5594, 1960).

== Personal life ==
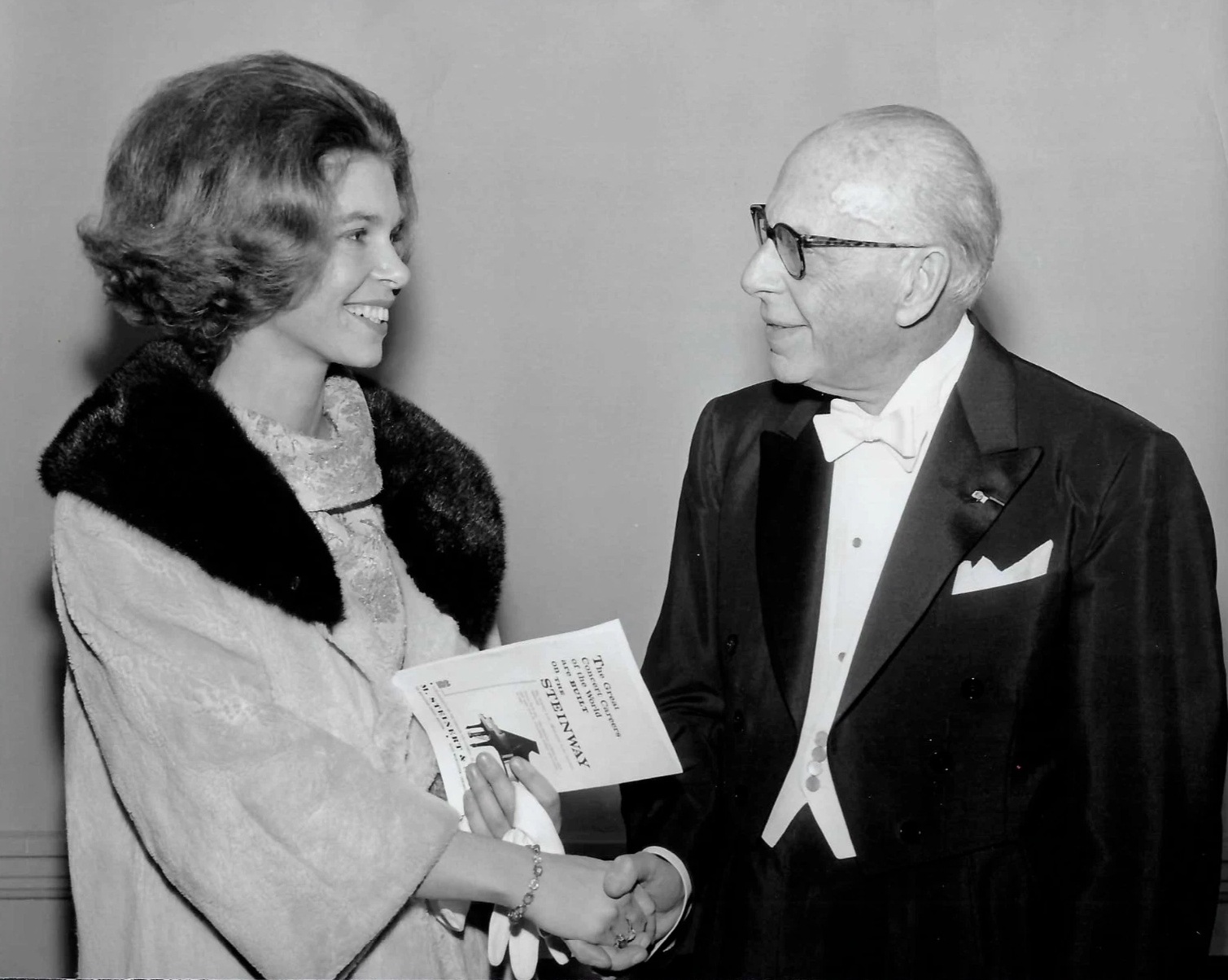
Szell with Princess Irene of Greece and Denmark in Boston in 1967

Szell married twice. The first, in 1920 to Olga Band (1898–1984), another of Richard Robert's pupils, ended in divorce in 1926. His second marriage, in 1938 to Helene Schultz Teltsch, originally from Prague, was much happier, and lasted until his death. Szell had homes on Park Avenue in New York City and in Shaker Heights, near Cleveland's orchestra hall. When not making music, he was a gourmet cook and an automobile enthusiast. He regularly refused the services of the orchestra's chauffeur and drove his own Cadillac to rehearsal until almost the end of his life.

The British government made Szell an honorary Commander of the Order of the British Empire (CBE) in 1963.

== Death ==
He died from bone-marrow cancer in Cleveland in 1970. His body was cremated, and his ashes were buried, in Sandy Springs, Georgia, along with his wife upon her death in 1991.

== Discography ==
Most of Szell's recordings were made with the Cleveland Orchestra for Epic/Columbia Masterworks (now Sony Classical). He also made recordings with the New York Philharmonic, the Vienna Philharmonic and the Amsterdam Concertgebouw Orchestra. Many live stereo recordings of repertoire Szell never conducted in the studio exist, both with the Cleveland Orchestra and other orchestras.

Below is a selection of Szell's more notable recordings — all with Szell conducting the Cleveland Orchestra (issued by Sony, unless otherwise noted).

Béla Bartók:

- Concerto for Orchestra (1965)

Ludwig van Beethoven:

- The 9 Symphonies (1957–64)
- Symphony No. 6 (New York Philharmonic)
- The Piano Concertos; Leon Fleisher (piano) (1959–61)
- The Piano Concertos; Emil Gilels (piano) (1968, EMI)
- Missa Solemnis (1967, TCO)

Johannes Brahms:

- The 4 Symphonies (1964–67)
- Piano Concertos; Leon Fleisher (piano) (1958 & 1962)
- Piano Concerto No1 Clifford Curzon (piano) (1962)
- Piano Concertos; Rudolf Serkin (piano) (1968 & 1966)
- Violin Concerto; David Oistrakh (violin) (1969, EMI)
- Concerto for violin and violoncello; David Oistrakh (violin), Mstislav Rostropovich (cello) (1969, EMI)

Anton Bruckner:

- Symphony No. 3 (1966)
- Symphony No. 8 (1969)

Claude Debussy:

- La mer (1963)

Antonín Dvořák:

- Symphonies Nos. 7–9 (1958–60)
- Slavonic Dances (1962–65)
- Cello Concerto; Pablo Casals (cello) / Czech Philharmonic Orchestra (1937, HMV)
- Cello Concerto; Pierre Fournier (cello) / Berlin Philharmonic Orchestra (1962, DG)

Joseph Haydn:

- Symphonies Nos. 88, 92–99, 104 (1954–69)

Zoltán Kodály:

- Háry János Suite (1969)

Gustav Mahler:

- Symphony No. 4; Judith Raskin (soprano) (1965)
- Symphony No. 6 (1967)
- Symphony No. 10 (Adagio only) (1958)
- Des Knaben Wunderhorn; Elisabeth Schwarzkopf (soprano), Dietrich Fischer-Dieskau (baritone) / London Symphony Orchestra (1968, EMI)

Felix Mendelssohn:

- Symphony No. 4 (1962)
- A Midsummer Night's Dream, Overture and Incidental Music (1967)

Wolfgang Amadeus Mozart:

- Symphony No. 39 Part of the first series of recording with the Cleveland Orchestra, (Columbia Masterworks MM-801) (April 22, 1947)
- Symphonies Nos. 28, 33, 35, 39–41 (1960–67)
- Eine kleine Nachtmusik (Serenade K. 525) (1968)
- Piano Concertos; Robert Casadesus (piano) (1955–68)

Szell as pianist
Piano Quartet No. 1 and No. 2; Budapest String Quartet (1946)
Violin Sonatas, K. 301, K. 304, K. 376 and K. 296; Rafael Druian (violin) (1967)

Modest Mussorgsky:

- Pictures at an Exhibition (1963)

Sergei Prokofiev:

- Symphony No. 5 (1959)
- Piano Concertos Nos. 1 & 3; Gary Graffman (p) (1966)

Maurice Ravel

- Daphnis et Chloé Suite No. 2 (1963)

Franz Schubert:

- Symphony No. 8 "Unfinished" (1957)
- Symphony No. 9 "The Great" (1957)

Robert Schumann:

- The 4 Symphonies (1958–60)

Jean Sibelius:

- Symphony No.2; Royal Concertgebouw Orchestra (1964, Philips)
- Symphony No.2 (1970) – Live concert in Tokyo, Japan, Szell's last recording.

Bedřich Smetana:

- The Moldau / New York Philharmonic (1951/2007 United Archives)
- Four Dances from the Bartered Bride (1958)
- String Quartet in E minor, From My Life (orch. Szell) (1949)

Richard Strauss:

- Don Juan (1957)
- Don Quixote; Pierre Fournier (cello), Abraham Skernick (viola) (1960)
- Till Eulenspiegels lustige Streiche (1957)
- Tod und Verklärung (1957)
- Four Last Songs; Elisabeth Schwarzkopf (S) / Radio-Symphonie-Orchester Berlin (1965, EMI)

Igor Stravinsky:

- The Firebird Suite (1919 version) (1961)

Pyotr Tchaikovsky:

- Symphony No. 4; London Symphony Orchestra (1962, Decca)
- Symphony No. 5 (1959)
- Symphony No. 6; Cleveland Orchestra (1969)
- Capriccio Italien, Op. 45; Cleveland Orchestra (1958)

Richard Wagner:

- Overtures, Preludes & Extracts from The Ring (1962–68)
- Tannhäuser, Helen Traubel, Alexander Kipnis, Lauritz Melchior, Metropolitan Opera Chorus & Orchestra, live (1942, Music & Arts)

William Walton:

- Symphony No. 2 "Liverpool" (1961)
- Partita for Orchestra (1959)
- Variations on Theme by Hindemith (1964)

== Notes and references ==
Notes

=== Sources ===
- Charry, Michael (2011). George Szell: A Life of Music. Champaign, Illinois: University of Illinois Press. ISBN 978-0-252-03616-3 – via Internet Archive.
- Rosenberg, Donald (2000). The Cleveland Orchestra Story: Second to None. Cleveland, Ohio: Grey & Company Publishers. ISBN 1-886228-24-8.
- Slonimsky, Nicolas; Kuhn, Laura Diane (2001). Baker's Biographical Dictionary of Musicians. Vol. 6. New York: G. Schirmer. pp. 3559–3560. ISBN 0-02-865525-7.
