= Richard Robert =

Austrian pianist, composer and music critic (1861 - 1924)

Richard Robert (25 March 1861 – 1 February 1924 in Kaltenleutgeben) was an Austrian pianist, composer, music critic, and music administrator, but he is most notable as a pedagogue in piano, composition and conducting. As a Viennese piano teacher, Richard Robert was discussed in the same breath as Emil von Sauer and Theodor Leschetizky. His notable students included Kurt Adler, Hans Gál, Clara Haskil, Rudolf Serkin and George Szell. See: List of music students by teacher: R to S#Richard Robert.

== Career ==
He was born in Vienna in 1861 as Robert Spitzer. (He apparently returned to his birth name in 1920.) He was of Jewish descent. He studied music at the Vienna Conservatory, under Julius Epstein (Gustav Mahler's teacher), Franz Krenn (teacher of Mahler and Leoš Janáček) and Anton Bruckner, then worked as a theatre conductor (Kapellmeister) and pianist. He was a friend of Johannes Brahms, with whom he once discussed Bruckner's String Quintet.

From 1885 to 1891 he edited the journal Neue Musikalische Rundschau. He also wrote music criticism for newspapers such as the Wiener Sonn- und Montags-Zeitung and Illustriertes Wiener Extrablatt.

He taught at the Neues Wiener Konservatorium (New Vienna Conservatory), and in 1909 for a short time became its director. One of his students there was the 15-year-old Hans Gál, who gained his music-teaching certificate in 1909. It was through Robert that Gál found his ideal mentor Eusebius Mandyczewski.

The conductor George Szell's first study was the piano, under Richard Robert. Szell's first wife Olga Band was a fellow student of Robert's. They married in 1920 but divorced in 1926. Szell wrote a testimonial for Richard Robert's 60th birthday, stressing his kindness, integrity, modesty and readiness to help, aside from his musical skills.

Rudolf Serkin started his studies with Richard Robert in 1912, when he was aged 9. This came about when he auditioned in Pilsen for Alfred Grünfeld, who was so impressed that he recommended Serkin study with Robert in Vienna. Serkin made his debut with the Vienna Symphony at age 12, playing Mendelssohn's G minor Concerto, but his family refused invitations for him to tour, in favour of continuing his studies with Robert. He had at least one more lesson with Robert long after he had become an established concert pianist.

The conductor Kurt Adler was initially a piano student of Robert's, and he dedicated his book The Art of Accompanying and Coaching to all the great musical influences of his life, including Professor Richard Robert.

His assistants included Anka Bernstein-Landau and his former student Vally Weigl.

Richard Robert also composed himself. His works include lieder, chamber music, and the opera Rhampsinit. He became president of the Wiener Tonkünstler-Verein (Vienna Composers' Association).

He and his wife Laura had no children of their own, but acted in loco parentis to many of his young students. Richard Robert died in Kaltenleutgeben in 1924, aged 62.

During the Nazi regime, Rudolf Serkin helped many people escape deportation by the Nazis; these included Robert's widow Laura Robert, but she died in Vienna before she could be brought to safety in the United States.

== Sources ==
- Stephen Lehmann and Marion Faber, Rudolf Serkin: A Life
- Schenker Documents Online
