= Nina Milkina =

Russian pianist (1919–2006)

- Нина Милкина
- Born: January 27, 1919; Moscow, Russian SR
- Died: November 29, 2006 (aged 87); London, United Kingdom
- Occupation: Pianist
- Spouse: Alastair Sedgwick

Signature
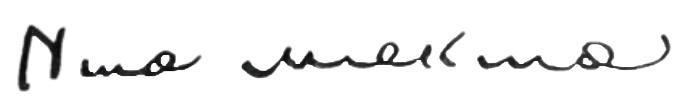

Nina Milkina (Russian: Нина Милкина; January 27, 1919 – November 29, 2006) was an English pianist of Russian descent. She began practicing piano when she was young alongside multiple prominent pianists and composers, and regularly performed for soldiers during World War II, traveling to their stations for solos. She was one of the first performers to appear on the BBC Third Programme, during which she regularly performed Mozart solos.

== Life and career ==
Nina Milkina was born on January 27, 1919 to a Jewish family in Moscow. Her father was a portrait artist and her mother was a harpist. Aged seven, she began learning the piano with Lev Conus and Alexander Glazunov before moving with her family to Paris in 1926. When she was 11 years old she made her first public debut in Paris with the Orchestre Lamoureux. That year she performed multiple works to Ralph Hawkes of Boosey & Hawkes, who later published some of them. A music critic at the time stated that her piece My Toys was too difficult for a child to play, without being aware that Milkina had composed it aged 11. Around the 1930s she moved to London to live with other family members, where throughout the decade she studied with Harold Craxton alongside Myra Hess.

Milkina was studying in London at the outbreak of World War II and began frequently touring areas where soldiers were stationed. She also began regularly soloing at the National Gallery of London in recitals created by Myra Hess. Around this time, she encountered her future husband, the then-soldier Alastair Sedgwick, after performing a concert in Bournemouth. The pair married in 1943, the same year Milkina's parents were deported to Germany, where they died in a Nazi concentration camp. In the late 1940s, she became one of the first artists to perform on the BBC Third Programme, where she became well-known for her weekly Mozart solos. She was invited to perform a recital dedicated to the late pianist at the Edinburgh International Festival.

Nina Milkina [was] widely recognised as an outstanding artiste and interpreter of the classical repertoire and in particular of the piano works of Mozart.

— Top Artiste At Hall, Solent Reporter

Around this time the British music company Boosey & Hawkes published many recording of her under an anglicized version of her name, Nina Milkin. In 1949, she joined a musical group set up by Harry Blech along with Denis Matthews, Peter Schidlof and Norbert Brainin among others. Between 1951 and 1978 she gave 16 performances in Scotland while touring with the Royal Scottish National Orchestra. Milkina began performing significantly less frequently following the birth of her children in 1958 and 1960. Around this time, she released the albums Scarlatti: 12 Sonatas (1958) and C.P.E. Bach: Sonatas Wq. 57/6, 57/2, 55/4, 61/2 (1959), which were devoted to Domenico Scarlatti and Carl Philipp Emanuel Bach respectively. In 1968 she also began performing alongside the Oromonte Piano Trio. She was diagnosed with cancer in the 1980s, forcing her to stop touring and to only record music in a studio. She began taking yearly summer trips to Sardinia around this time where she spent time preparing programs to teach others how to play certain pieces. In 1991, the cancer caused her to end her career as a pianist. She remained a teacher to some of her remaining students including Leon McCawley and Murray Perahia throughout the 1990s. Many of her recordings were reissued in 2001 as a result of her husband's efforts. She died at the age of 87 on November 29, 2006, in London.
