= Colorado MahlerFest =

Classical music festival in Boulder, Colorado

Coordinates: 40°0′36″N 105°16′22″W

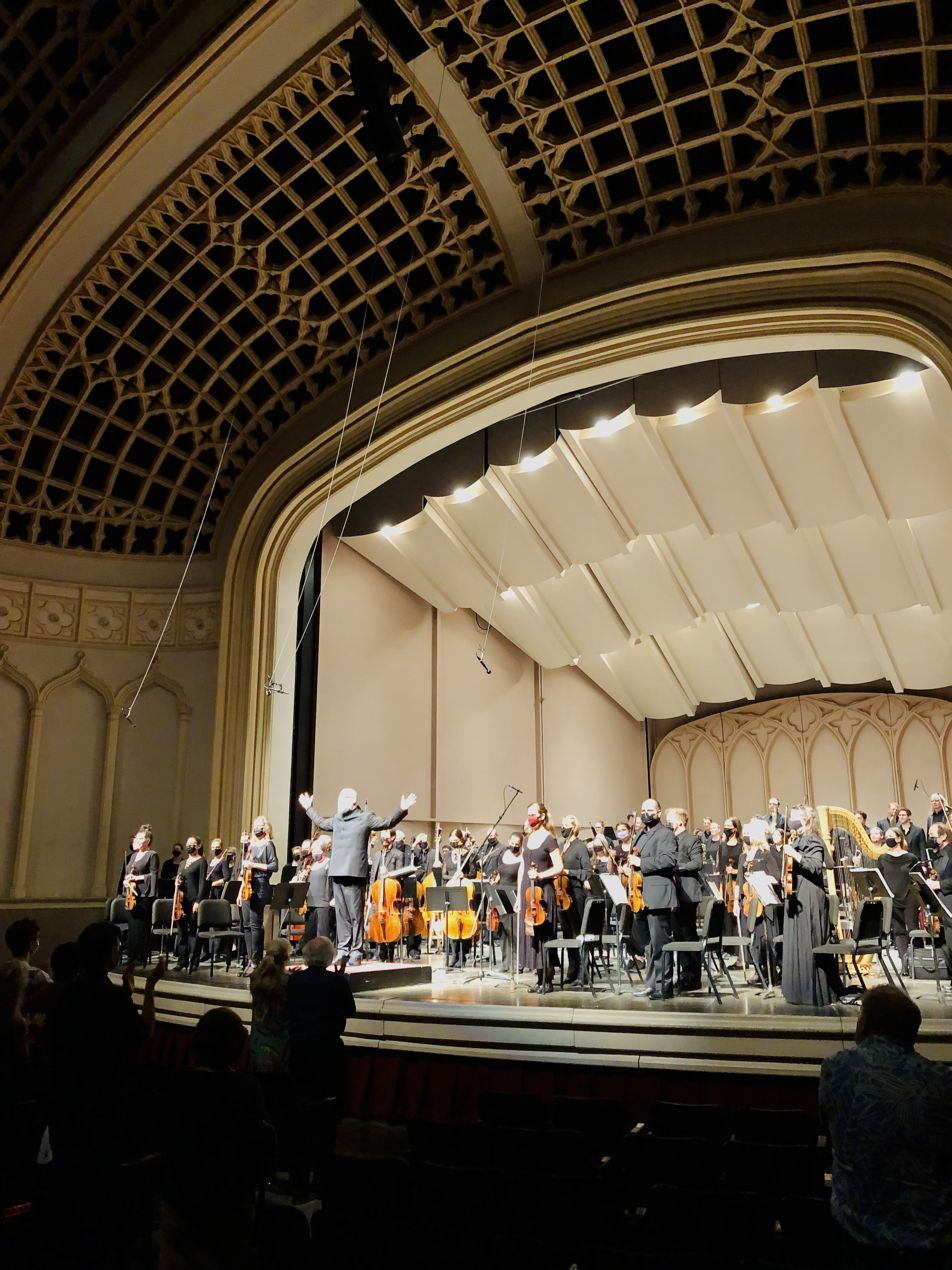
An image of the 2021 festival orchestra after performing in Mackey auditorium

Colorado MahlerFest is an annual event held in Boulder, Colorado, which each year celebrates one major symphonic work by Austrian composer Gustav Mahler. While "Colorado MahlerFest" is the official name of the event and the organization, the individual annual events are simply referred to as "MahlerFest" (dropping the "Colorado"), followed by a Roman numeral. It is the one of only two North American arts organizations to have received the Gold Medal of the International Gustav Mahler Society, the other being the New York Philharmonic. The founder of MahlerFest was conductor Robert Olson, who currently serves on the faculty of the University of Missouri–Kansas City who led the festival until his retirement in 2015. Kenneth Woods succeeded Olson as artistic director in 2016.

One of Woods' initiatives as the festival's second artistic director has been an expanded emphasis on contemporary music and the involvement of annual Visiting Composers, including Jesse Jones, David Matthews, Kurt Schwertsik and Donald Fraser. The festival has presented American premieres of Schwertsik's 'Nachtmusiken,' David Matthews' 'Romanza' and John McCabe's 'Pilgrim.' The festival has also run a mentoring scheme for advanced young conductors, The Mahler Conducting Fellowship, whose alumni include many of the most accomplished conductors of the new generation.

In 2017, the orchestra premiered a new revision of Derryck Cooke's Performing Version of Mahler's Tenth Symphony incorporating new corrections by Colin Matthews, David Matthews and Peter Wadl, having given the world premiere of Joseph Wheeler's completion of the Tenth in 1997. In 2019, the orchestra gave the world premiere of the new Critical Editions of Mahler's First Symphony and Blumine by Breitkopf & Härtel.

Each year, the festival hosts a symposium. Past speakers have included Donald Mitchell, Henry-Louis de La Grange, Stephen E. Hefling, Gilbert Kaplan, Peter Davison, Anna Stoll-Knecht and Morten Solvik.

Colorado MahlerFest received the gold medal of the International Gustav Mahler Society in Vienna in September 2005.
