= Kenneth Woods =

American conductor, composer and cellist

Kenneth Allen Woods (born 1968) is an American conductor, composer and cellist, resident in the UK.

== Early career ==
Woods studied conducting at the University of Cincinnati College-Conservatory of Music. His subsequent conducting mentors have included Leonard Slatkin, David Zinman, Jorma Panula and Gerhard Samuel. In 2000, Zinman selected Woods to be a fellow in the inaugural class of the American Academy of Conducting at Aspen. In 2001, Slatkin chose Woods as one of four participants in the Kennedy Center National Conducting Institute.

Woods was music director of the Dayton Philharmonic in 1999, of the Grande Ronde Symphony from 1999 to 2002, and of the Oregon East Symphony (OES) from 2000 to 2009. From 1999 to 2002, he was head of conducting, strings and chamber music at Eastern Oregon University.

== UK career ==
In 2009, Woods was appointed principal guest conductor of the Orchestra of the Swan. His recording projects with the Orchestra of the Swan included the first complete recording of the symphonies of Austrian composer Hans Gál, the complete symphonies of Robert Schumann, Gustav Mahler's Lieder eines fahrenden Gesellan and Das Lied von der Erde (orchestrated by Schoenberg), and new works for traditional Japanese instruments and orchestra, "Springs Sounds, Spring Seas".

=== English Symphony Orchestra ===
In 2012, the English Symphony Orchestra (ESO) named Woods as artistic director of its Malvern concert series, during an interregnum period for the orchestra. In 2013, the ESO elevated Woods to the post of principal conductor, and in 2015, to artistic director. During his ESO tenure, Woods has premiered, commissioned and made recordings of new works by Robert Fokkens, David Matthews, Emily Doolittle, Tom Kraines, Kile Smith, Geoffrey Gordon, Deborah Pritchard, Stephen Gerber, Nimrod Borenstein, Toby Young, Paul Patterson, Hans Gál, Donald Fraser, James Francis Brown and Jesse Jones. Woods led the ESO in its first full-length opera performance, of Jane Eyre by John Joubert, given its world premiere in October 2016.

In 2013, Woods re-established the position of ESO Composer-in-Association, with John McCabe in the post. Following McCabe's death in 2015, Philip Sawyers took up the position. Sawyers compositions for the ESO have included Songs of Loss and Regret, Fanfare, Concerto for Violin and Orchestra, Trumpet Concerto, Elegiac Rhapsody for Trumpet and Strings in Memory of John McCabe and his Third Symphony. Sawyers was succeeded in 2018 by David Matthews, whose tenure saw recordings of his Ninth Symphony, Variations for Strings and Double Concerto for Violin and Viola. In 2020, Adrian Williams took up the position.

Sawyers' Third Symphony also became the first work in the ESO's 21st Century Project, an effort to commissions nine new symphonies by leading composers. Subsequent works in the series have included David Matthews' Ninth Symphony and the Fifth Symphony of Matthew Taylor.

== Colorado MahlerFest ==
In 2015, Woods became the new artistic director of the Colorado MahlerFest, the second artistic director in the festival's history. At the Colorado MahlerFest, Woods established a new training institute for young conductors (the Mahler Conducting Fellowship), a chair for an annual visiting composer, and an expansion of the festival's chamber music and contemporary music offerings. Visiting composers have included David Matthews, Jesse Jones and Kurt Schwertsik. In 2017, Woods led the MahlerFest Orchestra in their first performance of the Deryck Cooke performing version of Mahler's Tenth Symphony in a new edition using revisions and corrections from Colin Matthews, David Matthews and Peter Wadl. In 2019, Woods and Colorado MahlerFest gave the world premiere performance of a new critical edition of Mahler's First Symphony by Breitkopf & Härtel.

== Arranger and composer ==
Woods' orchestrations and arrangements of music by other composers includes an orchestration of Brahms' Piano Quartet No. 2, recorded with the ESO for Nimbus. In 2012, the English Chamber Orchestra recorded his orchestration of Viktor Ullmann's Third String Quartet. Other arrangements and orchestrations include works by Mahler, Schubert, Humperdinck and Tchaikovsky. Woods' own music has been recorded on Avie Records.

== Entartete Musik ==
Woods was the cellist in the second American performance of Viktor Ullmann's Third String Quartet, following study with Henry Meyer, second violinist of the LaSalle String Quartet and a concentration camp survivor. Inspired by Meyer's teaching and experiences, Woods has advocated the music of composers known as Entartete Musik (Degenerate Music), after its suppression during the Third Reich. He has made recordings of music by Hans Krása, Ernst Krenek, Arnold Schoenberg, Mieczyslaw Weinberg and Hans Gál. Woods is Honorary Patron of the Hans Gál Society.

== Chamber music work ==
As a cellist, Woods has been a recipient of the Aspen Fellowship, the Dale Gilbert Award, the Strelow Quartet Fellowship, and the National Endowment for the Arts Rural Residency Grant. He was the founding cellist of the Taliesin Trio and of the Masala Quartet. In 2006, he became a founding artist of the Clocktower Chamber Music Festival in Durango, Colorado. In 2008, he became artist-in-residence at the Ischia Chamber Music Festival. That year he also become the founding cellist of the string trio, Ensemble Epomeo. The trio's first CD comprised the world premiere recordings of the complete string trios of Hans Gál, coupled with those of Hans Krása. Their next disc included string trios by Schnittke, Penderecki, Weinberg and Kurtág. In 2014, Ensemble Epomeo released "Auricolae: The Double Album", a collection of new storytelling works for violin, cello and narrator including new works by David Yang, Jay Reise, Andrew Waggoner, Kile Smith and Woods' own setting of Hans Christian Andersen's "The Ugly Duckling."

In 2018, Woods made his first recording as cellist of the newly formed Briggs Piano Trio, a disc including Shostakovich's Piano Trio in E minor and two piano trios by Hans Gál.

== Teaching and other work ==
Woods has established the Rose City International Conductor's Workshop at the invitation of the Rose City Chamber Orchestra. At the Colorado MahlerFest, Woods established the Mahler Conducting Fellowship. Woods has taught conducting in master classes organized by the BBC National Orchestra of Wales and The Bridgewater Hall, and is a consultant and has been an adjudicator at institutions such as the Royal College of Music.

Woods is the author of a blog, "A View from the Podium". He has written essays, features and programme notes for Gramophone, BBC Music Magazine, Classical Music Magazine, EMI Records, ICA Classics, Warner Classics, Avie Records, Somm Recordings, Toccata Classics, Listen Magazine and others.

== Other sources ==
- "On the Downbeat- Up and Coming Conductors," Joe Banno, Washington Post, July 2, 2001
- "Scotia Festival of Music on Home Stretch," Stephen Pedersen, Halifax Mail Star, June 7, 1997
- "Reading the Score and So Much More," Tim Page, Washington Post, June 24, 2001
- "Round Up the Usual Suspects," David Stabler, The Oregonian, May 27, 2007
- "Conductors Showcase at Roundtop," Jerry Young, Austin American Statesman, June 23, 1999
- "New Direction for NPO," Peter Palmer, Nottingham Evening Post, October 25, 2006
- "Conductor Says Arts at Risk When Funders Call the Tune," Western Mail, June 2, 2008
- "Student Conductors Learn Secrets of the Baton," The Oregonian, August 2, 2008

Cultural offices
Preceded by Vernon Handley	Principal Conductor, English Symphony Orchestra; 2013–present	Succeeded by incumbent
Preceded by Robert Olson	Artistic Director, Colorado MahlerFest; 2015–present	Succeeded by incumbent
