= Die heilige Ente =

Opera by Hans Gál

Die heilige Ente: ein Spiel mit Göttern und Menschen (German: The sacred duck: a play with Gods and men) is an opera with a prelude and three acts by the composer Hans Gál (his Op. 15), to a libretto by Karl Michael Leventzow and Leo Feld. Written in 1920–21, it was premiered in Düsseldorf on 29 April 1923 under the baton of Georg Szell.

== Performance history ==
The opera was a great success, and was immediately taken up by other German-language opera houses during the 1920s and early 1930s, including Breslau, Weimar, Aachen, Chemnitz, Kassel, Königsberg, Prague and Berlin. The Berlin and Breslau performances were undertaken by the director Heinz Tietjen. The critic Hanns Gutmann enthused over the Berlin production: "The score of this opera demonstrates how the orchestra has developed throughout the 19th century and is handled with the same virtuosity as Mahler and Strauss". In 1929 Die heilige Ente became the first contemporary opera to be broadcast by RAVAG (Vienna Radio). However, after 1933 the Nazi regime in Germany banned further performances as Gál was of Jewish descent.

An abbreviated version of the opera for children, using chamber orchestra accompaniment, was produced at Opera Köln in 2007. A revival of the full opera was produced at the Berlin Sophiensaele in 2012, and then in Theater Heidelberg in 2020.

== Roles ==
Role	Voice type	Premiere cast, 29 April 1923 (Conductor: Georg Szell)
A mandarin	baritone	
Li, his wife	soprano	Elsa Oehme-Förster
Yang, a coolie	tenor	Josef Witt
The strolling player	buffo bass	
The bonze	bass	
The major domo	buffo tenor	
A nun	contralto	
The God of the Waterbasin	tenor	
The God of the Doors	baritone	
The God above the Throne	bass	
Chorus: bonzes, Buddhist nuns, carriers, coolies, palace servants, etc.

== Synopsis ==
The satirical plot envisages bored Chinese gods amusing themselves by exchanging the identities of two of the characters. The eponymous duck brings matters to a happy resolution.

The duck-breeder Yang is taking a duck to the palace when he falls for the charms of Li, the wife of the mandarin. The duck is meanwhile stolen, and the mandarin condemns Yang to death. However, the gods transpose their brains; Yang (now the mandarin) commutes the sentence which would now fall on the mandarin (in Yang's body), and also takes the opportunity to pour scorn upon the gods. In anger, the gods reverse the personality switch. The duck now reappears and the (restored) mandarin, considering this a miracle, offers to raise Yang to the nobility. Yang however has had enough of changes, and prefers to seek his fortune in the wide world.

== Orchestration ==
The opera is scored for a large orchestra, with triple woodwind and brass instruments, a range of percussion instruments, and an onstage band of trumpets, trombones, kettledrums, gong and bells.
