= Deborah Pritchard =

British composer

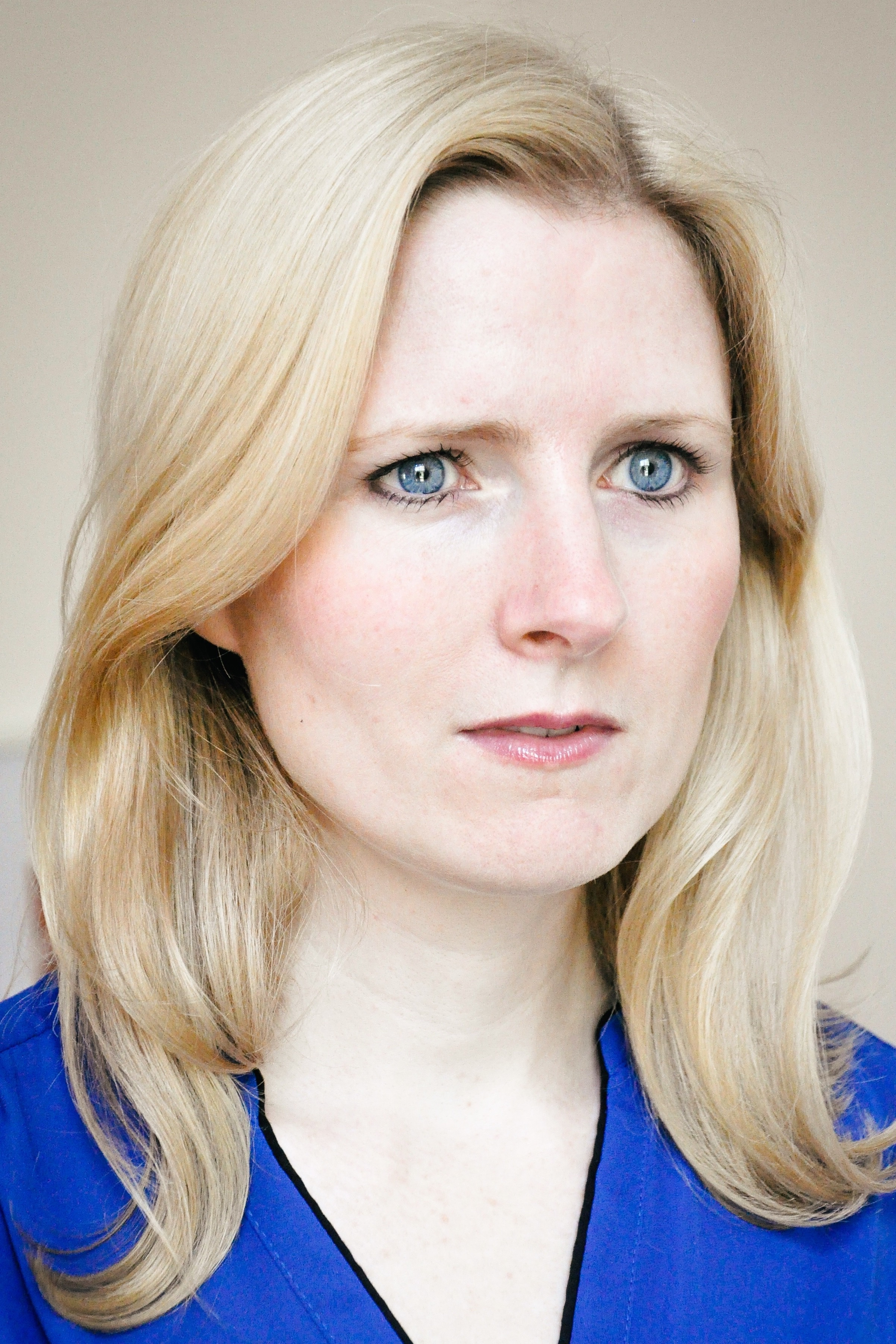
Deborah Pritchard

Deborah Pritchard is a British composer. She is known for her concert works, a compositional approach informed by her synaesthesia, and her work in response to visual artists, most notably Maggi Hambling, Hugie O'Donoghue and Marc Chagall. She also paints music in the form of visualisations and music maps. The London Symphony Orchestra premiered her large orchestral piece The Angel Standing in the Sun at LSO St Lukes in 2015, her violin concerto Calandra was premiered by Jennifer Pike and the BBC Symphony Orchestra at the Barbican, London in 2022 and Radiance for solo cello, responding to The Peace Window by Marc Chagall at the United Nations, was premiere by Natalie Clein at the Purbeck International Chamber Music Festival in 2022. She won a British Composer Award for her solo violin piece Inside Colour in 2017,

== Education ==
Pritchard was awarded an undergraduate degree and postgraduate diploma from the Guildhall School of Music and Drama where she studied as both composer and double bassist. She then completed a MMus degree in composition at the Royal Academy of Music with Simon Bainbridge, subsequently holding the position of Manson Fellow in Composition. She was awarded her DPhil from Worcester College, Oxford where she studied with Robert Saxton, now holding Associate Membership of The Faculty of Music, Oxford. She was made Associate of the Royal Academy of Music in 2019 and held the tenure of visiting research fellow at Keble College, Oxford, from 2022 to 2023.

== Career ==
Her work received early attention following the inclusion of her piece Chanctonbury Ring on the album "The Hoxton Thirteen", released by NMC Recordings in 2001. Her music has since been released by labels including Signum Records, Nimbus, Linn Records, BIS Records, Hyperion Records and Orchid Classics.

Her music has been premiered, performed and broadcast worldwide by ensembles including the BBC Symphony Orchestra, London Symphony Orchestra, London Sinfonietta, BBC National Orchestra of Wales, Royal Northern Sinfonia, Philharmonia Orchestra, Manchester Camerata, English String Orchestra, Orchestra of the Swan, Chamber Domaine, the Composers Ensemble, BBC Singers, Choir of New College, Oxford, Christ Church Cathedral Choir, Gesualdo Six and the Marian Consort.

Recent works includes her large work for choir and symphony orchestra Kandinsky Songs premiered at the Forbidden City Concert Hall, Beijing, China in 2024; her new song Everyone Sang for Carolyn Sampson and Joseph Middleton, premiered at the Wigmore Hall in 2023 and Chagall's Light for solo violin and orchestra, inspired by the Marc Chagall windows of All Saints Church, Tudeley, premiered by Greta Multu and Chamber Domain, conducted by Thomas Kemp in 2023.

She was composer in residence at the 2016 Lichfield Festival and the 2022 Purbeck International Chamber Music Festival where Natalie Clein premiered her new work for solo cello.

== Synaesthesia ==
Pritchard experiences synaesthesia, specifically perceiving sound as colour, light and darkness. In her own words;

"Ever since I was a child, I’ve been aware that some harmonies seemed warm whilst others appeared cold. The relationship between colours and intervals seemed so natural to me that I didn’t question it ... When I engage with colour, light and darkness in my work, I become aware of a broader emotional content and hope to illuminate some kind of beauty to the listener."

Pritchard frequently paints visualisations of her musical works, and has also been commissioned by the London Sinfonietta to paint music maps of works by other composers (such as György Ligeti, Unsuk Chin and Thomas Adès) for inclusion in concert programme notes. Her visualisations and music maps were exhibited at the Royal Academy of Music's Amazing Women of the Academy exhibition from 2018 to 2019. In 2020 she was commissioned a graphic score Colour Circle by the London Sinfonietta to launch their Postcard Pieces project over lockdown, inspired by Wassily Kandinsky's book Concerning the Spiritual in Art.

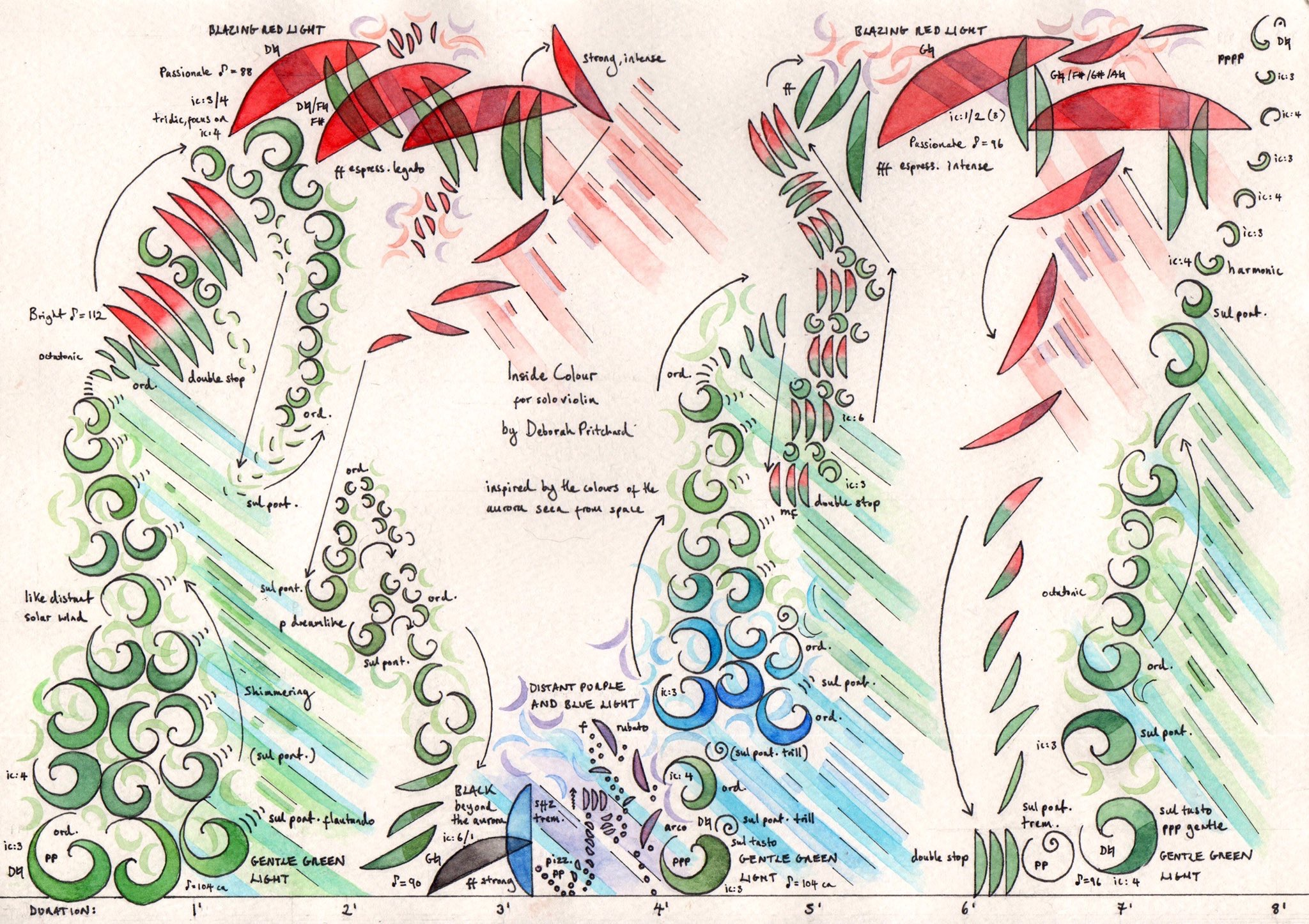
Pritchard's visualisation of her solo violin piece Inside Colour

== Works inspired by visual art ==
Pritchard has written several pieces inspired by Marc Chagall including Radiance for solo cello responding to The Peace Window at the United Nations premiered by Natalie Clein at the Purbeck International Chamber Music Festival in 2022, and Chagall's Light for solo violin and orchestra, written after the series of windows at All Saints Church, Tudeley, premiered by Greta Mutlu and Chamber Domaine at the 2023 Music@Malling Festival in Kent.

She has also written a number of pieces after the contemporary artist Maggi Hambling, working in collaboration at her studio in Suffolk.

The first of these was the violin concerto Wall of Water (2014), which was premiered by violinist Harriet Mackenzie and the English String Orchestra during the Frieze Art Fair in London. Images of Hambling's series of seascape paintings, also titled Wall of Water, were projected during the performance.

Subsequent pieces written in response to Hambling's work were Edge, a double concerto for violin, harp and string orchestra (after Hambling's paintings on global warming), premiered by Harriet Mackenzie, Catrin Finch and the Aldeburgh Festival Orchestra, conducted by Jonathan Berman at the 2017 Aldeburgh Festival and a solo violin piece for Harriet Mackenzie called March 2020 in response to Hambling's painting of the same name, with both painting and music created over lockdown.

Other artists on whose work Pritchard has drawn on include Hughie O'Donoghue, George Shaw, Yinka Shonibare, Steinunn Thorarinsdottir, J.M.W. Turner and James Turrell.

== Selected works ==
- Light (2023) for solo violin
- Calandra (2022) for solo violin and string orchestra
- The Light of the World (2022) for solo violin and SATB div. choir
- Couleurs Celeste (2022) for violin and cello
- The World song cycle (2022) for soprano and piano
- Illumination (2022) for string orchestra
- Peace (2021) for soprano and string quartet
- March 2020 (2020) for solo violin, in response to the painting by Maggi Hambling
- Green Renewed (2020) for solo cello
- Colour Circle (2020) graphic score for any instrument
- Trophies of Peace (2020) for choir, in response to Trophies by Steinunn Thorarinsdottir
- New College Service - Magnificat and Nunc Dimittis (2020) for choir
- The Heavens Declare (2019) for choir
- For Mother Earth (revised 2019) for string orchestra
- River Above (2018) for solo saxophone
- Storm Song (2017) for soprano, piano and cello
- Edge (2017) for violin, harp and string orchestra, in response to the paintings by Maggi Hambling
- Inside Colour (2016) for solo violin
- Seven Halts on the Somme (2016) for trumpet, harp and string orchestra, in response to paintings by Hughie O'Donoghue
- From Night (2015) for solo cello
- Of The Heart (2015) for string orchestra
- The Angel Standing in the Sun (2015) for orchestra, in response to artwork by J.M.W. Turner
- Benedicite (2014) for choir and trumpet=
- From Night (2014) for solo cello
- I Will Lift Up Mine Eyes Unto The Hills (2014) for choir
- Wall of Water (2014) for violin and string orchestra
- Skyspace (2012) for solo piccolo trumpet and string orchestra, in response to artwork by James Turrell.
- Lord's Prayer (2009) for choir
- Chanctonbury Ring (2000) for Pierrot Ensemble
- Four Short Movements (2000) for cello and piano
