= Das Lied der Nacht =

Opera by Hans Gál

Das Lied der Nacht ("The Song of the Night") Op. 23, is a 1926 German opera, or "dramatic ballad", composed by Hans Gál to a libretto by Karl Michael von Levetzow, premiered in Breslau in April of that year. The opera is set in twelfth century Palermo.

== Recording ==
A 2018 CD recording was issued by the CPO label (555 186-2) with *Opernchor des Theaters Osnabrück, Osnabrücker Symphonieorchester, conducted by Andreas Hotz and the following singers in their respective roles:

- Gritt Gnauck, alto – Fürstin-Äbtissin
- Lina Liu, soprano – Lianora, Erbprinzessin von Sizilien
- Susann Vent-Wunderlich soprano – Hämone, jüngere Folgedame
- Rhys Jenkins, baritone – Tancred, Vetter Lianoras
- José Gallisa, bass – Kanzler-Reichsverweser
- Ferdinand von Bothmer, tenor – Bootsmann, Namenlose Sänger
