= Oregon East Symphony =

Orchestra based in Pendleton, Oregon, US

- Short name: OES
- Founded: 1986
- Location: Pendleton, Oregon
- Principal conductor: Beau Benson
- Website: oregoneastsymphony.org

The Oregon East Symphony (OES) is an orchestra based in Pendleton, Oregon, United States. Highlights of the orchestra's repertoire include ongoing cycles of the orchestral works of Beethoven and Mahler, as well as major works by Elgar, Mozart, Hindemith, Rachmaninoff and Dvořák. The orchestra has also presented world-premieres of works by composers including Emily Doolittle, John McKinnon, Leandro Espinosa, Margaret Mayer, and the film-composer Christopher Thomas.

== History ==
The Oregon East Symphony was created in 1986 by a consortium of local musicians and music lovers who wanted to establish a community orchestra in Pendleton, Oregon. Pendleton, population 17,310, is over 200 miles from the nearest metropolitan area.

== General information ==
The Oregon East Symphony and Chorale offer a subscription series of five classical concerts and perform a yearly Holiday Concert, which often features other local ensembles. In 2001, the OES founded a new training orchestra, the A Sharp Players. The orchestra's primary home is the Vert Auditorium.

== Youth programs ==
Playing for Keeps is a unique and comprehensive music education project, which was initiated in 2001 by the Oregon East Symphony board of directors.

== Oregon East Symphony Chorale ==
From early on, the OES organization included a volunteer symphony chorus. From 1985 until 1999, the chorale was directed by Lee Friese. During the tenure of Kenneth Woods, the choir has been directed by Woods and a number of guest conductors and chorus masters, including Cyril Myers, Randal Thomas, Cheryl Carlson, Michael Frasier, and William Mayclin.

Chorale highlights of recent years include performances of Dvorak's Stabat Mater, Mahler's Symphony No. 2, Beethoven's Symphony No. 9, Mozart's C minor Mass, the Bach Christmas Oratorio and Bizet's Carmen. The chorale also performs on the annual holiday concerts, where it often focuses on light, seasonal repertoire under the direction of the chorus master.
