= Janet Hilton =

British clarinet soloist and teacher (born 1945)

- Born: 1 January 1945 (age 81); Liverpool, England
- Instrument: Clarinet
- Years active: 1970–present
- Labels: Chandos, Naxos, ASV Digital

Janet Lesley Hilton (born 1 January 1945) is a British clarinet soloist, teacher, chamber performer, and orchestral musician. She has gained widespread recognition for her extensive recordings with the Chandos and Naxos record labels.

== Biography ==
Born in Liverpool, England, she studied at the Royal Manchester College of Music (1961–1965), followed by postgraduate study at the Vienna Konservatorium (1966).

Between 1970 and 1973, she performed as principal clarinet with the Welsh National Opera, then continued on to the Scottish Chamber Orchestra (1973–1980) and the Kent Opera (1984). She was also the principal clarinet of the Manchester Camerata and Director of Camerata Wind Soloists.

Her teaching positions include the Royal Conservatoire of Scotland (Glasgow, Scotland, 1974–1980), the Royal Northern College of Music (Manchester, England, 1982–1986), and the Royal Birmingham Conservatoire (1992), where she was Head of Woodwind. From 1998 to 2009 she was Head of Woodwind at the Royal College of Music, London. Currently she is professor of clarinet at the Royal College of Music.

Hilton recorded key works for the clarinet with the Lindsay String Quartet, including quintets by Mozart, Brahms, and von Weber, as well as English composers Arnold Bax, Arthur Bliss, and Ralph Vaughan Williams. Michael Bryant acknowledges her as one of the contributors to the British tradition of clarinet playing.

Four clarinet concertos have been dedicated to her: John McCabe's Clarinet Concerto (1977), Edward Harper's Clarinet Concerto (1982), Elizabeth Maconchy's Concertino for Clarinet and Small Orchestra (1984), and Alun Hoddinott's Concerto No. 2, Op. 128 (1986). These four concertos were released with the BBC Scottish Symphony Orchestra conducted by Rumon Gamba on the album Dedications (Clarinet Classics, 2000).

In 2016, she released Flying Solo, solo clarinet literature dating from 1919 through 2000. In his review of the album, Anthony J. Costa writes, 'The styles hint at a variety of influences including blues (Turnage), ragtime (Stravinsky), commedia dell'Arte (Cahuzac), poetry of Wordsworth (Roxburg), nature (Messaien), mythology (Crosse) and Indian classical music (Mayer).'

== Discography, selected ==
- Lindsay String Quartet with Janet Hilton, clarinet. Clarinet Quintet in B Minor Op.115; Sonata in E Flat Major for Clarinet and Piano, Op.120 No.2 / Brahms. Chandos ABR 1035, 1981, LP.
- City of Birmingham Symphony Orchestra conducted by Neeme Järvi. Janet Hilton Plays Weber. Chandos ABRD 1058, 1982, LP.
- Lindsay String Quartet with Janet Hilton, clarinet. Bax, Bliss, Vaughan Williams. Chandos ABRD 1078, 1983, LP.
- Lindsay String Quartet with Janet Hilton, clarinet. Quintet in B Flat Op. 34 (J.182) / Weber. Chandos CHAN 8366, 1985, CD.
- Janet Hilton (clarinet), Nobuko Imai (viola), and Roger Vignoles (piano). Mozart / Schumann / Bruch: Clarinet Trios. Chandos CHAN 8776, 1990.
- Janet Hilton (clarinet) and Keith Swallow (piano). Rhapsodie: French Music for Clarinet & Piano / Poulenc, Ravel, Debussy, Saint-Saëns, Roussel, Milhaud. Chandos 6589, 1994, CD.
- Lindsay String Quartet with Janet Hilton, clarinet. Clarinet Quintet in A, K581 / Mozart. ASV Digital CD DCA 1042, 1998, CD.
- BBC Scottish Symphony Orchestra conducted by Rumon Gamba. Janet Hilton, clarinet solo. Dedications: Four British Clarinet Concertos Composed for Janet Hilton. Clarinet Classics CC0034, 2000, CD.
- Janet Hilton (clarinet) and Jakob Fichert (piano). Max Reger Clarinet Sonatas (Complete). Naxos 8.572173, 2010, CD.
- Janet Hilton, solo clarinet. Flying Solo / Malcolm Arnold, Edwin Roxburgh, Olivier Messiaen, Mark-Anthony Turnage, Gordon Crosse, Lennox Berkeley, Igor Stravinsky, Richard Rodney Bennett, Louis Cahuzac, Henri Tomasi, John Mayer. Clarinet and Saxophone Classics CC0072, 2016, CD.
