= Leon McCawley =

British classical pianist

Leon McCawley (born 12 July 1973) is a British classical pianist.

He studied with Heather Slade-Lipkin at Chetham's School of Music in Manchester, and with Eleanor Sokoloff at The Curtis Institute of Music in the United States, and latterly pianist Nina Milkina was a source of inspiration.

He won the first prize in the Ninth International Beethoven Piano Competition in Vienna in 1993, and second prize in the Leeds International Pianoforte Competition. He has given solo performances with major orchestras such as the London Philharmonic Orchestra and Royal Philharmonic Orchestra.

McCawley has produced CD recordings of music by Samuel Barber, by Ludwig van Beethoven, and by Robert Schumann, as well as a complete edition of Mozart's piano sonatas and a world premiere recording of the complete piano works of Hans Gál. Two of his recordings have earned the "Editor's Choice" award of the journal The Gramophone.
