= Orchestra of the Swan =

Chamber orchestra based in Warwick, England

Orchestra of the Swan is a British professional chamber orchestra based at Warwick Schools Foundation in Warwick. It is Resident Orchestra at the Royal Birmingham Conservatoire, The Courtyard Hereford, Warwick Hall and the Stratford Play House (until its closure in January 2025) with regular concert series at Number 8 Pershore.

Founded in 1995 the orchestra has been creatively led by Artistic Director David Le Page since 2018. It gives over 45 concerts annually and is increasing its overseas touring. In 2014 the orchestra undertook its first highly successful tour to China. In 2016 The Swan performed at the Istanbul International Festival, and in 2017-18 toured to Mexico and New York (Carnegie Hall). The Swan has also toured the UK with groups such as Steve Harley & Cockney Rebel and James, with sell-out performances at London's Albert Hall.

Recordings and digital concerts (a strand of digital creativity spurred on by the Covid lockdown in 2020) have been nominated Gramophone Choice awards, Album of the Week on Classic FM and Scala Radio (UK) and Washington Public Radio and live concert recordings are frequently broadcast on USA Performance Today, in Canada and Australia.

A dynamic new touring series – Swan Projects – is gaining momentum. The first of these is Earthcycle, a project, with associated educational resources that focus on the impact of climate change, including a podcast featuring George Monbiot and Madeleine Finlay based on Vivaldi’s Four Seasons alongside a new commission by jazz/baroque composer and Associate Artist David Gordon, interspersed with 4 folk songs arranged for orchestra by David Le Page and sung by Jackie Oates.

== Mixtape Albums ==
The Swan's extensive discography includes its 2023 mixtape album 'Echoes' conducted by Philip Sheppard featuring 14 tracks including orchestral arrangements of songs by Frank Zappa, Adrian Utley, The Velvet Underground and A Winged Victory for the Sullen alongside classical standards by J.S. Bach, Delius, Max Richter, Philip Glass and Finzi, which reached number 10 in the Specialist Classical Charts. BBC 6 Music's Iggy Pop described The Swan's Venus in Furs arr. David Le Page as "Beautiful". 'Timelapse' (Album of the Week on Classic FM and Scala Radio) and 'Labyrinths' (Album of the Week on Scala Radio) that meld classical repertoire with orchestral arrangements of popular songs which reached number 17 in the Official Charts.

Further recordings feature repertoire by Barber, Bax, Berlioz, Brahms, Copland, Debussy, Elgar, Finzi, Ireland, Mahler, Mendelssohn, Mozart, Schumann, Strauss, Vaughan Williams and the world premiere recording of the complete symphonies by Hans Gál (1890-1987) conducted by Kenneth Woods. The latter received outstanding critical acclaim and was featured on BBC Radio 3 ‘Composer of the Week’. In addition, Mendelssohn's D minor Violin Concerto with Tamsin Waley-Cohen, and conducted by David Curtis, was BBC Music Magazine's ‘Recommended Recording’.

Recordings of new work include Philip Sawyers' Symphonies, works for trumpet and orchestra by John McCabe, Robert Saxton and Deborah Pritchard and joint commissions with Kyo-Shin-An Arts of new work for koto, shakuhachi and chamber orchestra.

Earthcycle, released on 19 January 2024, is a 2 CD album, incorporating new compositions by David Gordon, newly arranged folk songs by Le Page and Jackie Oates, and Vivaldi’s four concerti. Vocals from Jackie Oates, harpsichord and piano, David Gordon, and violin David Le Page with Orchestra of the Swan.

Their latest mixtape album Light and Shadow was released in June 2025 on Signum Classics. The album is the latest installment in their "mixtape" series, featuring new arrangements of music from films and TV shows by composers such as Ennio Morricone and Thomas Newman.

== Discography ==
Title	Details
Wolfgang Amadeus Mozart – Piano Concertos KV 413, KV 414, KV41	Released: May 2007
Arnold Bax – Concertino for Piano and Orchestra, John Ireland – Piano Concerto & Legend	Released: October 2009
Copland – Clarinet Concerto, Appalachian Spring Finzi – Clarinet Concerto, Romance for Strings	Released: May 2010
Hans Gal – Symphony No. 3, Schumann – Symphony No. 3 ‘Rhenish’	Released: March 2011
Gustav Mahler – Das Leid von der Erde & Lieder eins fahrenden Gesellen	Released: May 2011
Gustav Mahler – Symphony No 4, Hector Berlioz – Nuits D’été	Released: October 2011
Hans Gál – Symphony No. 4, op. 105, Robert Schumann – Symphony No. 2, op. 61	Released: March 2012
Spring Sounds, Spring Seas, James Nyoraku Schlefer – Shakuhachi Concerto & Haru no Umi Redux, Daron Aric Hagen – Koto Concerto “Genji”	Released: Summer 2012
Hans Gal – Symphony No. 2, Schumann – Symphony No. 4	Released: April 2013
Troy Story – An intergalactic opera [DVD]	Released: July 2013
Felix Mendelssohn – Violin Concerto in D Minor & Concert for Violin, Piano and Strings	Released: September 2013
Aaron Copland – Quiet City & Eight Poems of Emily Dickinson / Samuel Barber – Knoxville: Summer of 1915 & Capricorn Concerto / George Gershwin – Summertime	Released: February 2014
Hans Gal – Symphony No. 1, Schumann – Symphony No. 1	Released: March 2014
Schönberg – Verklärte Nacht, Brahms – Serenade No. 1	Released: June 2014
Philip Sawyer – Cello Concerto / Symphony No.2 / Concertante for Violin, Piano & String	Released: June 2014
Ralph Vaughan Williams – The Lark Ascending & Violin Concerto in D minor / Edward Elgar – Introduction and Allegro & Serenade for Strings	Released: September 2014
Paul Spicer – Unfinished Remembering	Released: September 2014
Psalm – Contemporary British Trumpet Concertos (McCabe	Released: November 2014
Hans Gál – The Four Symphonies	Released: January 2015
Antonio Vivaldi – The Four Seasons	Released: December 2015
John Ireland – Music for String Orchestra	Released: April 2016
Shakespeare Live! From The RSC [DVD]	Released: May 2016 – RSC & BBC
Shostakovich – Piano concertos and Piano Sonatas	Released: October 2016
Beethoven – Piano trios Vol.1	Released: October 2019 – Nimbus
Not Now, Bernard and other stories	Released: February 2020
Timelapse	Released: January 2021
Vivaldi Sleep	Released: February 2021
Labyrinths	Released: November 2021
Façade by Sir William Walton	Released: January 2022
Echoes	Released: May 2023
Entranced	Released: October 2023
Earthcycle	Released: January 2024
Light & Shadow	Released: June 2025
