= Chamber Domaine =

British chamber music ensemble

Chamber Domaine is a British chamber music ensemble. The ensemble gave its highly praised South Bank and Wigmore Hall debuts in 1999 and since then has performed at leading festivals and concert series in the United Kingdom, Europe and North America.

Chamber Domaine focuses on instrumental chamber music and song with programmes that range from the Baroque through to Contemporary; chamber ensemble through to chamber orchestra. They frequently give world and UK premieres by leading composers and have worked with Judith Bingham at the City of London Festival, Piers Hellawell at the Cheltenham International Festival and Arvo Pärt at the Edinburgh Festival.

The ensemble has a residency at Gresham College where their current lecture recital series explores Haydn in London. They have also had residencies at the Victoria and Albert Museum, the Imperial War Museum, London and the Arnold Schoenberg Centre, Vienna.

The ensemble has an education programme and works regularly with the Wigmore Hall Education and Community department. They have an ongoing project Music of Our Time which links art, poetry, architecture and music from the 20th Century in workshops and concerts, notably with the actress Helen Lederer and the composer David Horne.

== Reviews ==
- BBC Radio 3: “the most innovative ensemble in Britain today”
- The Times: “Chamber Domaine brilliantly demonstrated the thrill of young players successfully climbing Mount Everest… with exhilarating bravery and expressive force”
- Classic FM, regarding their recent CD release, Gorecki: Life Journey: "…it’s a fascinating, beautifully chosen programme which shows Gorecki's stylistic journey from avant-garde, sparse astringency, to his less dissonant, more softly expressive later style. Across the board, Chamber Domaine's performances are precise of attack and brilliant of tone, with a soulfulness that cuts to the heart of even the steelier sounding works."
