= Rudolf Serkin =

Bohemia-born American pianist (1903–1991)

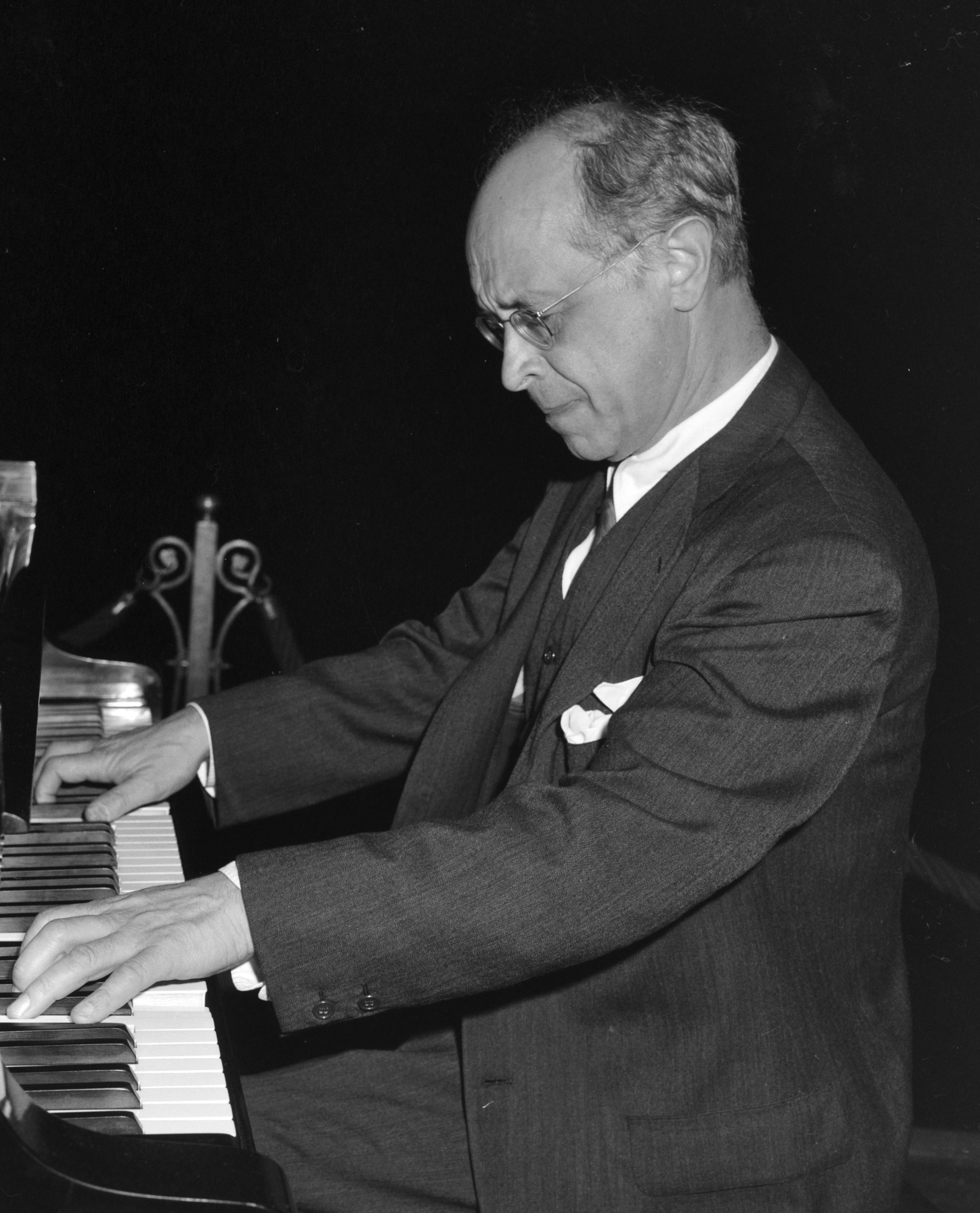
- Serkin in 1962
- Born: March 28, 1903; Cheb, Bohemia, Austria-Hungary
- Died: May 8, 1991 (aged 88); Guilford, Vermont, United States
- Occupation: Classical pianist
- Years active: 1916–1988
- Spouse: Irene Busch
- Children: 7, including Peter
- Awards: Presidential Medal of Freedom

Rudolf Serkin (28 March 1903 – 8 May 1991) was a Bohemian-born Austrian-American pianist. He is widely regarded as one of the greatest Beethoven interpreters of the 20th century.

== Early life, childhood debut, and education ==
Serkin was born in Cheb, Bohemia, Austria-Hungary (now the Czech Republic), to a Russian Jewish family. His father, Mordko Serkin, "had been a Russian basso, and taught him to read music before he could read words."

Hailed as a child prodigy, he was sent to Vienna at the age of 9, where he studied piano with Richard Robert and, later, composition with Joseph Marx, making his public debut with the Vienna Philharmonic at 12. From 1918 to 1920, he studied composition with Arnold Schoenberg and participated actively in Schoenberg's Society for the Private Performance of Music.

== Career ==
Serkin began a regular concert career in 1920, living in Berlin with the German violinist Adolf Busch and his family, which included a then-3-year-old daughter Irene, whom Serkin would marry 15 years later.

In 1921, at age 17, he made his Berlin debut performing in Busch's ensemble as the keyboard soloist in the Brandenburg Concerto No. 5. At the end of the concert, Busch told Serkin to play an encore to the enthusiastic audience. Serkin later reported that he asked Busch, "What shall I play?" and Busch "as a joke," told him to play the Goldberg Variations "and I took him seriously. When I finished,there were only four people left: Adolf Busch, Artur Schnabel, Alfred Einstein, and me."

In the 1920s and early 1930s, Serkin performed throughout Europe both as a soloist and with Busch and the Busch Quartet. With the rise of Hitler in Germany in 1933, Serkin and the Busches (who were not Jewish but who vehemently opposed the Nazi regime) left Berlin for Basel, Switzerland.

In 1933, Serkin made his first United States appearance at the Coolidge Festival in Washington, D.C., where he performed with Adolf Busch. In 1936, he launched his solo concert career in the US with the New York Philharmonic under Arturo Toscanini. His performance of Ludwig van Beethoven's Fourth Piano Concerto was critically well received; Olin Downes of the New York Times wrote, "We have seldom heard a pianist's performance which so admirably combined the most penetrating analysis with artistic enthusiasm and warm feeling. Similarly, the technical performance was clean and precise, but also beautiful and of a poetic coloring." In 1937, Serkin played his first New York City recital at Carnegie Hall, again to critical acclaim: Downes wrote, "What Mr. Serkin did was to display a colossal art, which he devoted to the most idealistic purposes."

=== Emigration to the United States ===
Shortly after the outbreak of World War II in 1939, the Serkins and Busches emigrated to the United States, where Serkin taught several generations of pianists at the Curtis Institute of Music in Philadelphia. From 1968 to 1976 he served as the Institute's director. He lived with his growing family, first in New York, then in Philadelphia, as well as on a dairy farm in rural Guilford, Vermont. In 1951, Serkin and Adolf Busch founded the Marlboro Music School and Festival in Marlboro, Vermont, with the goal of stimulating interest in and performance of chamber music in the United States. He made numerous recordings from the 1940s into the 1980s, including one at RCA Victor of Beethoven's Piano Concerto No. 4 in 1944, with the NBC Symphony Orchestra conducted by Toscanini. Most of his recordings were made for Columbia Masterworks, although in the 1980s he also recorded for Deutsche Grammophon and Telarc. Serkin admired the music of Max Reger, which he discovered while working with Adolf Busch. In 1959, he became the first pianist in the United States to record Reger's Piano Concerto, Op. 114, with Eugene Ormandy and the Philadelphia Orchestra.

External audio
- You may listen to Rudolf Serkin with the New York Philharmonic Orchestra conducted by Bruno Walter performing Ludwig van Beethoven's Piano Concerto No. 5 in E flat (Emperor) Op. 73 in 1941 here on archive.org

Serkin was awarded the Presidential Medal of Freedom in 1963 and in March 1972 celebrated his 100th appearance with the New York Philharmonic by playing Johannes Brahms' Piano Concerto No. 1. The orchestra and board of directors also named Serkin an honorary member of the New York Philharmonic-Symphony Society, a distinction also conferred on Aaron Copland, Igor Stravinsky, and Paul Hindemith. In 1986, he celebrated his 50th anniversary as a guest artist with the orchestra. He is regarded as one of the primary interpreters of the music of Beethoven in the 20th century.

He toured all over the world and continued his solo career and recording activities until illness prevented further work in 1989.

== Personal life ==
Serkin married Irene Busch, the daughter of German violinist Adolf Busch, in 1935.

He and Irene were the parents of seven children (one of whom died in infancy), including pianist Peter Serkin and cellist Judith Serkin. They had 15 grandchildren, including the composer David Ludwig and the bassoonist Natalya Rose Vrbsky.

Serkin died of cancer on 8 May 1991, aged 88, at home on his Guilford, Vermont farm. His widow Irene Busch Serkin died in 1998.

== Awards and recognition ==
External audio
- You may hear Rudolf Serkin with Alexander Schneider conducting the Columbia Symphony Orchestra in Wolfgang Amadeus Mozart's: Piano Concerto No.21 in C major, k. 467; Piano Concerto No. 27 in B flat major, K. 595 in 1957; Here on archive.org

- Member, American Academy of Arts and Sciences (1960)
- Presidential Medal of Freedom (1963)
- Ernst von Siemens Music Prize (1978)
- Kennedy Center Honors (1981)
- Member, American Philosophical Society (1983)
- Grammy Award for Best Chamber-Music Performance – Mstislav Rostropovich and Rudolf Serkin for Brahms: Cello Sonata No. 1 in E minor, Op. 38; and Cello Sonata No. 2 in F, Op. 99 (1984)
- National Medal of Arts (1988)
