= Op. 33 =

In music, Op. 33 stands for Opus number 33. Compositions that are assigned this number include:

- Beethoven – Bagatelles, Op. 33
- Chopin – Mazurkas, Op. 33
- Dvořák – Piano Concerto
- Eberl – Symphony in E-flat
- Enescu – Chamber Symphony
- Frankel – Symphony No. 1
- French – The Love for Three Oranges
- Glazunov – Symphony No. 3
- Haydn – String Quartets, Op. 33
- Jón Leifs – Requiem
- Kurtág – Stele
- Nielsen – Violin Concerto
- Rachmaninoff – Études-Tableaux, Op. 33
- Saint-Saëns – Cello Concerto No. 1
- Schoenberg – Zwei Klavierstücke
- Schumann – 6 Lieder (part songs for men's voices with piano ad lib)
- Sibelius – The Rapids-Rider's Brides (Koskenlaskijan morsiamet), song for soloist and orchestra (1897)
- Tchaikovsky – Variations on a Rococo Theme
- Wheeldon – Rococo Variations
