= Op. 34 =

In music, Op. 34 stands for Opus number 34. Compositions that are assigned this number include:

- Arnold – The Dancing Master
- Brahms – Piano Quintet
- Britten – The Young Person's Guide to the Orchestra
- Chopin – Waltzes, Op. 34
- Dvořák – String Quartet No. 9
- Eberl – Symphony in D minor
- Ginastera – Bomarzo
- Grieg – Two Elegiac Melodies
- Hanson – Symphony No. 4
- Larsson – Symphony No. 3 in C minor (1945)
- Nielsen – Aladdin
- Prokofiev– Overture on Hebrew Themes
- Rachmaninoff – 14 Songs
- Rimsky – Capriccio Espagnol
- Schumann – 4 Duets (soprano and tenor with piano)
- Shostakovich – 24 Preludes
- Suk – Ripening
- Szymanowski – Masques
- Tchaikovsky – Valse-Scherzo
- Weber – Clarinet Quintet
