= The Creatures of Prometheus =

Ballet by Ludwig van Beethoven

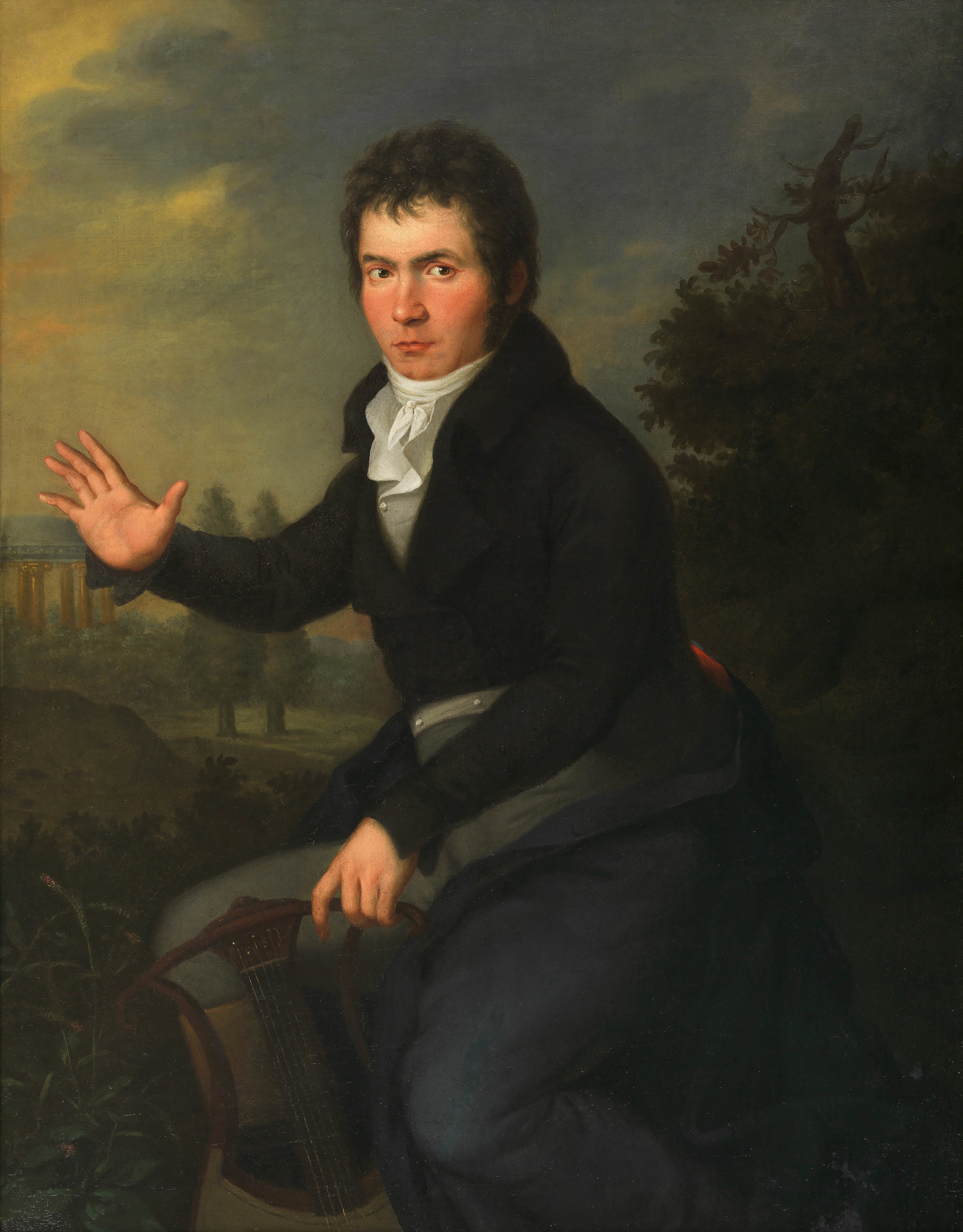
Portrait of Ludwig van Beethoven (age 33) with a lyre-guitar by Joseph Willibrord Mähler (c. 1804)

The Creatures of Prometheus (German: Die Geschöpfe des Prometheus), Op. 43, is a ballet composed in 1801 by Ludwig van Beethoven following the libretto of Salvatore Viganò. The ballet premiered on 28 March 1801 at the Burgtheater in Vienna and was given 28 performances. It was premiered in New York at the Park Theatre on 14 June 1808 being one of the first full-length works by Beethoven to be performed in the United States. It is the only full-length ballet by Beethoven.

== History ==
Viganò was tasked with presenting a work to the Archduchess Maria Theresa at the Vienna Court Theatre (Burgtheater), and chose the subject matter of Prometheus in an allegorical sense. While Viganò usually composed his own music for his performances, he felt this performance was far too important and asked Beethoven to compose instead. The ballet was written in two acts, with Beethoven creating an overture, an introduction, fifteen numbers, and a finale.

== Summary ==
The Creatures of Prometheus – Overture
NBC Symphony Orchestra conducted by Arturo Toscanini, recorded in 1944

The Creatures of Prometheus – 14. Andante (Solo della signora Casentini)
Performed by Laila Storch (oboe), William McColl (basset horn), and Anita Cummings (piano)

The ballet is an allegory based on the mythical story of Prometheus, who stole fire from Zeus in order to create mankind from clay. In the ballet, Prometheus finds mankind in a state of ignorance and decides to introduce the ideas of science and art to them, largely based on Beethoven's own support of the Enlightenment movement. Prometheus introduces the humans to Apollo, the god of the arts, who commands Amphion, Arion and Orpheus to teach music, and Melpomene and Thalia to teach tragedy and comedy. The humans also meet with Terpsichore who, along with Pan, introduces them to the Pastoral Dance, followed by Dionysus introducing his Heroic Dance.

In 1930, musicologist Jean Chantavoine and playwright Maurice Léna made a detailed reconstruction of the plot in relation to the music, based on sources that have stood the test of time. A summary of this reconstruction is given below.

== Music and reconstruction of the plot ==
Overture

Act 1 opens with an introduction, followed by three numbers.

1. Introduction – Humanity is represented as two still lifeless statues at the Olympus (originally played by Maria Casentini and Salvatore Viganò, who also created the choreography). Zeus tries to stop Prometheus giving the fire to the people through a fierce storm. Yet Prometheus succeeds. He collapses in exhaustion.
2. Poco adagio – The two statues come to life (first the man and then the woman). Without further life experience, the two dance around carefree, to the annoyance of Prometheus.
3. Adagio – allegro con brio – Prometheus is angry at the unmannerliness of the two statues and he considers destroying humanity. But heaven intervenes. A divine light makes him change his mind.
4. Minuetto – Prometheus now plans to educate the people by taking them to the Parnassus. In this minuet he introduces them with flowers and fruit respectively. At the end the trio heads away, towards the Parnassus. Curtain.

Act 2 includes another 13 numbers:

4. Maestoso – Andante – The gods, led by Apollo, have taken place on a temple on the Parnassus. Prometheus arrives with the two humans and explains that they need to be educated so that they develop minds and emotions. The lessons begin.
5. Adagio – Andante quasi allegretto – Their feelings are aroused by harp playing of Amphion, flute playing of Euterpe (some sources mention Arion) and cello playing of Orpheus. The man and woman fall in love with each other.
6. Un poco adagio – Allegro – Joyful dance of the two humans, for whom a world has opened.
7. Grave – The humans show respect for Prometheus and Apollo. The lesson continues.
8. Allegro con brio – Presto – By the god Mars they are taught the martial art by means of an impressive procession.
9. Adagio – Allegro molto – But then death comes in the form of Melpomene. Since Prometheus was the bringer of not only life, but with it death, she considers it righteous to punish him with death. He is overthrown. A long hiatus. In the dark, Prometheus appears to be dead.
10. Pastorale – Thaleia makes death recoil by summoning youth and nature to oppose it. Prometheus awakes and watches the scene.
11. Andante – At a sign of Dionysus, Silenus enters.
12. Maestoso (also known as "Solo di Gioia" for solo dancer Gaetano Gioia) – Procession of Silenus (some sources name Dionysus). Danse comique that revolves around wine.
13. Allegro – Comodo – Dance of Pan and two fauns or nymphs.
14. Andante – Adagio (also known as "Solo della Casentini", written for Beethoven's prima ballerina, Maria Casentini) – The three graces continue to work on the emotional development of the woman. Solo of the prima ballerina. Cupids arrive. The wedding is being prepared.
15. Andantino – Adagio (also known as "Solo di Viganò") – The man is brought before Apollo. Solo of the primo ballerino and duet.
16. Finale – Wedding where different groups enter, pay tribute to the gods and celebrate the success of Prometheus' mission.

According to musicologist Lewis Lockwood, Beethoven's music for this ballet is "easier and lighter than music for the concert hall ... [I]t shows Beethoven exploiting instruments and coloristic orchestral effects that would never appear in his symphonies or serious dramatic overtures." Beethoven later based the fourth movement of his Eroica symphony and his Eroica Variations (piano) on the main theme of the last movement (Finale) of this ballet.

The ballet requires the use of harp and basset horn among the orchestral instruments, instruments Beethoven rarely employed.

== See also ==
- Prometheus in other musical works
