= Symphony in D minor (Eberl) =

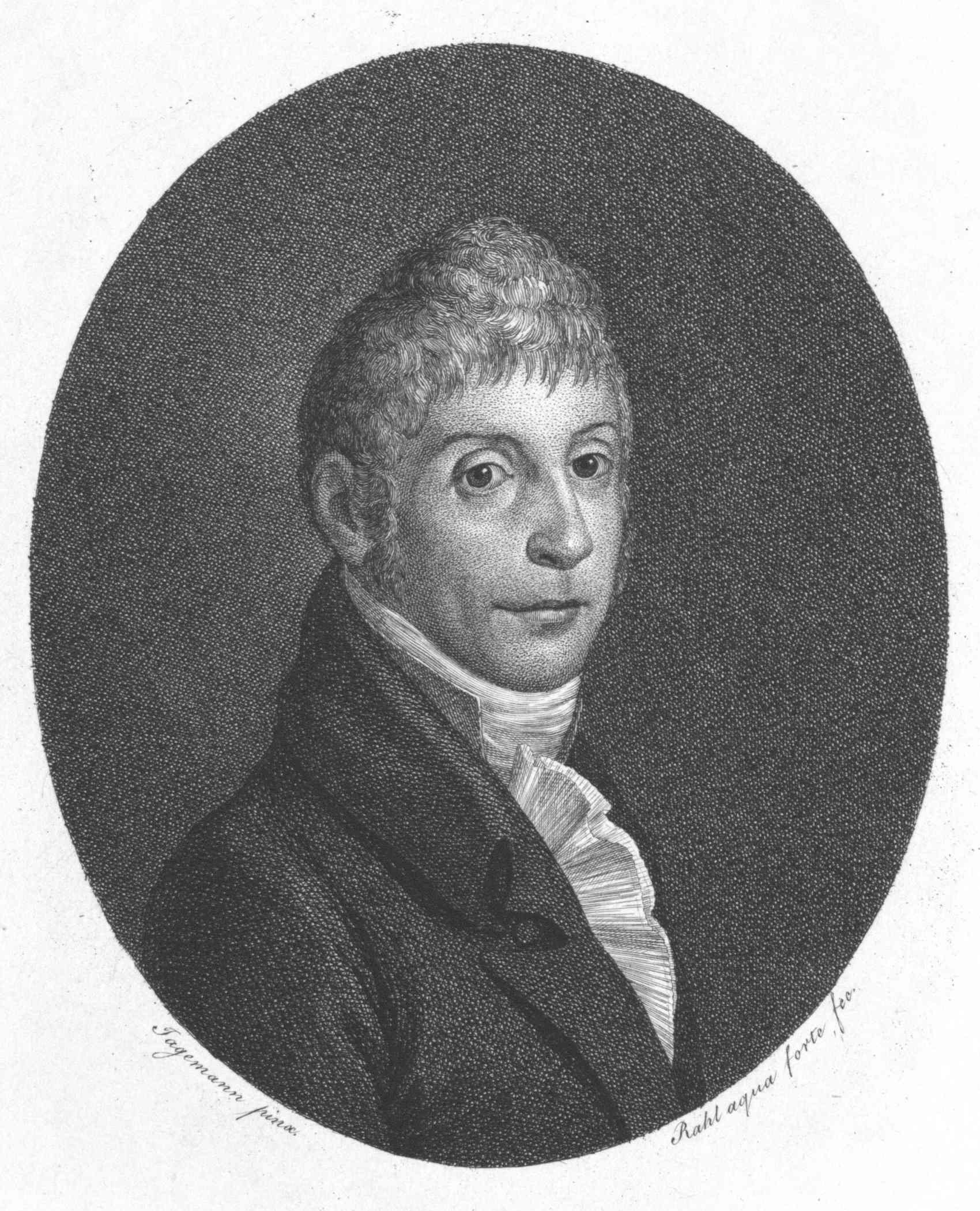
Anton Eberl

The Symphony in D minor, Opus 34 by the Viennese composer Anton Eberl (1765-1807) was written during the course of 1804. The premiere took place in Vienna, Austria on January 25, 1805. It is classical in style. The performance time is about 30 minutes. It is scored for 2 clarinets, 2 oboes, 2 bassoons, 2 horns, 2 trumpets, timpani and strings.

== Movements ==
There are three movements:

1. Andante maestoso e sostenuto, in D minor – Tempo di marcia, in D major – Allegro agitato, in D minor
2. Andante con moto, in A major
3. Finale: Vivace assai, in D major

== Early performances and reviews ==
After the January 1805 premiere a review written for the Berlin magazine Der Freimüthige stated: "A completely new Eberl symphony in D corresponded exactly to what one is entitled to expect from this great composer; it unites beautiful and pleasant ideas with novelty, audacity, and power; It is full of vivid ideas, full of brilliant twists and turns, but still united in a beautiful unity." And, the Viennese correspondent for Allgemeine musikalische enthusiastically reported the Eberl symphony in D minor was "a mighty, bold poem in which the power of this composer and the fire of his mind break free and bold. In the last fugal pieces lies great strength, and in the beautiful march a very excellent instrumental effect. Since Mozart's, Haydn's and Beethoven's symphonies, nothing has appeared that could be placed so honorably beside them."

On May 1, 1805, Eberl's Symphony op. 34 was heard in a concert of the pianist Marie Bigot, a review in the Berlinische musikalische Zeitung reported that "in a new, broadly conceived and deeply felt symphony by Eberl in D this composer evokes gripping passion, high pathos, and the art of controlling a powerful stream of diverse ideas with exceptional power."

In the Allgemeine musikalische Zeitung on the occasion of its first performance in Leipzig on November 21, 1805, the formal peculiarities of the work are positively emphasized in this review: "We find the fact that the author of the symphony has given a different style than the usual one, very well; it is also evident that he has brought a great deal of mass into his work, and has succeeded in grouping it in a clever way, which is intended to have an extremely violent effect. No doubt, this symphony will excite interest anywhere where it can be performed well." This D minor Symphony, along with Eberl's Symphony in E flat major, Op. 33 for the next two decades was an integral part of the Leipzig repertoire; every year either op. 33 or op. 34 was heard as part of the Gewandhaus concerts. It was not until the beginning of the 1830s that Eberl's two symphonies finally lost their appeal. On February 7, 1833, a symphony by Eberl was heard for the last time as part of the Gewandhaus concerts.

== Discography ==
Various works by composers Dall'Abaco, Locatelli, Cannabich, Carl Stamitz, Fils, Fränzl, Johann Baptist Wanhal, Leopold Koželuch and Anton Eberl by Concerto Köln (Orchestra) Teldec 2564698899 (6 CD) (One CD contains three Symphonies by Eberl)
