= The Rapids-Rider's Brides (disambiguation) =

The Rapids-Rider's Brides is a song and orchestra written in 1897 by Jean Sibelius.

The Rapids-Rider's Brides may also refer to:

- The Rapids-Rider's Brides (1923 film)
- The Rapids-Rider's Brides (1937 film)
