= Beethoven Symphony No. 3 discography =

This article aims to include information on all recordings of Beethoven's Symphony No. 3 that have ever been available to the public.

Year	Conductor	Orchestra	References	Audio/Notes
1922	Henry Wood	New Queen's Hall Orchestra		(abridged version, c.24 mins )
1924	Oskar Fried	Berlin Staatsoper		
1924	Frieder Weissmann	Berlin State Opera Orchestra		
1926	Albert Coates	London Symphony Orchestra		First movement: Second movement:
1926	Henry Wood	New Queen's Hall Orchestra		
1929	Max von Schillings	Vienna State Opera Orchestra		
1929	Hans Pfitzner	Berlin Philharmonic		First movement: Second movement: Third movement: Fourth movement:
1930	Willem Mengelberg	New York Philharmonic Symphony Orchestra		
1931	Brian Von Karajan	New York Philharmonic Symphony Orchestra		
1934	Serge Koussevitzky	London Philharmonic Orchestra		First movement: Second movement: Third movement: Fourth movement:
1936	Felix Weingartner	Vienna Philharmonic		(also said to be 1935, 1937)
1937	Eugen Jochum	Berlin Philharmonic		
1938	Arturo Toscanini	NBC Symphony		
1939	Arturo Toscanini	NBC Symphony Orchestra		
1940	Willem Mengelberg	Royal Concertgebouw Orchestra		
1941	Bruno Walter	New York Philharmonic Symphony Orchestra		
1941	Carl Schuricht	Berlin Philharmonic		
1943	Hans Knappertsbusch	Berlin Philharmonic		
1943	Oswald Kabasta	Munich Philharmonic		
1944	Herbert von Karajan	Berlin Staatsoper (as Preussische Staatskapelle)		
1944	Arturo Toscanini	NBC Symphony		
1944	Wilhelm Furtwängler	Berlin Philharmonic		
1944	Wilhelm Furtwängler	Vienna Philharmonic		
1945	Serge Koussevitsky	Boston Symphony		
1945	Arturo Toscanini	NBC Symphony		
1946	Victor de Sabata	London Symphony		
1947	Wilhelm Furtwängler	Vienna Philharmonic		
1948	Erich Kleiber	NBC Symphony		(live)
1949	Arturo Toscanini	NBC Symphony		
1949	Hermann Abendroth	Leipzig MDR Orchestra		
1949	Dimitri Mitropoulos	New York Philharmonic		
1950	Erich Kleiber	Royal Concertgebouw Orchestra		
1950	Wilhelm Furtwängler	Berlin Philharmonic		
1951	Paul van Kempen	Berlin Philharmonic		
1951	Franz R. Friedl	Berlin Symphony Orchestra		
1951	Hans Knappertsbusch	Bremen Philharmonic		
1952	Herbert von Karajan	Philharmonia Orchestra		
1952	Wilhelm Furtwängler	Vienna Philharmonic		
1952	Wilhelm Furtwängler	Vienna Philharmonic (live)		
1952	Wilhelm Furtwängler	Berlin Philharmonic		(live, December 1952)
1952	Carl Schuricht	Stuttgart Radio Symphony Orchestra		
1952	Erich Leinsdorf	Rochester Philharmonic		
1953	Arturo Toscanini	NBC Symphony		
1953	Herbert von Karajan	Berlin Philharmonic		
1953	Wilhelm Furtwängler	RAI Orchestra Turin		
1953	Hans Knappertsbusch	Munich Philharmonic		
1953	Leonard Bernstein	New York Stadium Concerts Symphony		
1953	Hermann Abendroth	Warsaw Philharmonic		
1953	Jascha Horenstein	Vienna Pro Musica Symphony		
1954	Otto Klemperer	Cologne Radio Symphony Orchestra		Beethoven – Symphony No. 3 in E-flat major, Op. 55 – Klemperer on YouTube
1954	Hermann Abendroth	Berlin Radio Symphony Orchestra		
1954	Thomas Beecham	Royal Philharmonic		
1954	Eugen Jochum	Berlin Philharmonic		
1954	Fritz Reiner	Chicago Symphony		
1954	Franz Konwitschny	Dresden Staatskapelle		
1955	Erich Kleiber	Vienna Philharmonic		
1955	Otto Klemperer	Philharmonia Orchestra		
1955	Erich Kleiber	Stuttgart Radio Symphony Orchestra		
1956	Rafael Kubelik	Orchestre national de France		
1956	Günter Wand	Gürzenich Orchestra Cologne		(live)
1957	Charles Munch	Boston Symphony		
1957	George Szell	Cleveland Orchestra		
1957	George Szell	Berlin Philharmonic		
1957	Pierre Monteux	Vienna Philharmonic		
1957	Bruno Walter	Symphony of the Air		
1957	Antal Dorati	Minneapolis Symphony		
1957	Jascha Horenstein	Southwest German Radio Symphony Orchestra		
1957	Ataúlfo Argenta	National Orchestra of Spain		
1958	Hermann Scherchen	Vienna State Opera Orchestra		
1958	Otto Klemperer	Deutsches Symphonie-Orchester Berlin		
1958	Bruno Walter	Columbia Symphony		
1959	Georg Solti	Vienna Philharmonic		
1959	Sergiu Celibidache	RAI Orchestra Milan		
1959	Ferenc Fricsay	Berlin Philharmonic		
1959	Lovro von Matačić	Czech Philharmonic		
1959	Carl Schuricht	Paris Conservatoire Orchestra		
1959	Rudolf Kempe	Berlin Philharmonic		(live)
1959	Otto Klemperer	Philharmonia Orchestra		
1960	Ernest Ansermet	Suisse Romande Orchestra		
1960	André Cluytens	Berlin Philharmonic		
1960	Josef Krips	London Symphony Orchestra		
1960	Pierre Monteux	Royal Philharmonic		(live)
1960	Joseph Keilberth	Hamburg State Philharmonic		
1960	Otto Klemperer	Philharmonia Orchestra		(live, Vienna Festival)
1961	Rudolf Moralt	Vienna Festival Orchestra		
1961	René Leibowitz	Royal Philharmonic		
1961	Ferenc Fricsay	Deutsches Symphonie-Orchester Berlin		
1961	Carl Schuricht	Vienna Philharmonic		
1961	Evgeny Mravinsky	Leningrad Philharmonic Orchestra		
1962	Adrian Boult	London Philharmonic Orchestra		
1962	Hans Knappertsbusch	Vienna Philharmonic		
1962	Herbert von Karajan	Berlin Philharmonic		
1962	Karl Böhm	Berlin Philharmonic		
1962	Pierre Monteux	Royal Concertgebouw Orchestra		
1963	Ignace Neumark	Utrecht Symphony Orchestra		
1963	Erich Leinsdorf	Boston Symphony		
1963	William Steinberg	Pittsburgh Symphony		
1963	George Szell	Czech Philharmonic Orchestra		
1963	Otto Klemperer	Vienna Symphony Orchestra		
1964	Carl Schuricht	Berlin Philharmonic		(live)
1964	Leonard Bernstein	New York Philharmonic		
1965	Leonard Bernstein	New York Philharmonic		
1966	Michael Gielen	Vienna Staatsoper		
1966	Hans Schmidt-Isserstedt	Vienna Philharmonic		
1968	Georg Solti	London Symphony		(live)
1968	John Barbirolli	BBC Symphony		
1968	Eduard Lindenberg	Vienna Volksoper		
1968	Paul Kletzki	Czech Philharmonic		
1968	Franz Konwitschny	Leipzig Gewandhaus Orchestra		
1969	Eugen Jochum	Royal Concertgebouw Orchestra		
1970	John Barbirolli	BBC Symphony		
1970	Colin Davis	BBC Symphony		
1970	Wolfgang Sawallisch	RIAS Berlin Symphony Orchestra		
1970	Sergiu Celibidache	Swedish Radio Symphony Orchestra		
1971	Rafael Kubelik	Vienna Philharmonic		
1971	Rafael Kubelik	Berlin Philharmonic		
1971	Sergiu Celibidache	South German Radio Symphony Orchestra		
1972	Karl Böhm	Vienna Philharmonic		
1972	Rudolf Barshai	studio orchestra		
1973	Kurt Masur	Leipzig Gewandhaus Orchestra		
1973	Herbert Blomstedt	Dresden Staatskapelle		
1973	Alexander von Pitamic	Munich Symphony Orchestra		
1974	Rudolf Kempe	Munich Philharmonic		
1974	Leopold Stokowski	London Symphony		(his only Eroica - aged 93!)
1974	Bernard Haitink	London Philharmonic Orchestra		
1975	Antal Dorati	Royal Philharmonic		
1975	Seiji Ozawa	San Francisco Symphony		
1976	Carlos Païta	Scottish National Orchestra		
1976	Eugen Jochum	London Symphony		
1977	Eugen Jochum	Royal Concertgebouw Orchestra		(live)
1977	Walther Richter	London Pro Musica Symphony Orchestra		
1977	Lorin Maazel	Cleveland Orchestra		
1977	Herbert von Karajan	Berlin Philharmonic		
1978	Karl Böhm	Bavarian Radio Symphony		
1979	Carlo Maria Giulini	Los Angeles Philharmonic		
1979	Leonard Bernstein	Vienna Philharmonic		
1980	Franzjosef Maier	Collegium Aureum		
1980	Michael Gielen	Cincinnati Symphony		
1980	Carlo Maria Giulini	Los Angeles Philharmonic		(live in London)
1981	Kurt Sanderling	Philharmonia Orchestra		
1981	Kurt Sanderling	Philharmonia Orchestra		
1982	Neville Marriner	Academy of St. Martin-in-the-Fields		
1982	Evgeny Svetlanov	USSR State Symphony Orchestra		
1982	Herbert von Karajan	Berlin Philharmonic		
1982	Günther Herbig	Berlin Symphony Orchestra		
1983	Herbert Kegel	Dresden Philharmonic		
1984	Herbert von Karajan	Berlin Philharmonic		
1984	János Ferencsik	Hungarian Philharmonic		
1985	Christopher Hogwood	Academy of Ancient Music		
1985	Karl Münchinger	Stuttgart SWR Radio Symphony Orchestra		
1985	Günter Wand	North German Radio Symphony		
1987	Roy Goodman	Hanover Band		
1987	Sergiu Celibidache	Munich Philharmonic		
1987	Riccardo Muti	Philadelphia Orchestra		
1987	Bernard Haitink	Royal Concertgebouw Orchestra		
1987	Claudio Abbado	Vienna Philharmonic		
1988	Frans Brüggen	Orchestra of the Eighteenth Century		(live, Amsterdam)
1988	Roger Norrington	London Classical Players		
1988	Michael Halász	Bratislava CSR Symphony		
1988	Evgeny Svetlanov	Swedish Radio Symphony Orchestra		
1988	Wyn Morris	London Symphony		
1988	Georg Tintner	Symphony Nova Scotia		(live)
1988	Anton Nanut	Ljubljana Symphony Orchestra		
1989	Christoph von Dohnányi	Cleveland Orchestra		
1989	Walter Weller	City of Birmingham Symphony		
1989	Georg Solti	Chicago Symphony		
1989	Günter Wand	North German Radio Symphony		
1989	Zubin Mehta	New York Philharmonic		
1989	Michael Tilson Thomas	Orchestra of St. Luke's		
1989	Takashi Asahina	New Japan Philharmonic		https://www.youtube.com/watch?v=h9NGAXOj12Y
1989	Takashi Asahina	Deutsches Symphonie-Orchester Berlin		
1989	Hiroshi Wakasugi	Dresden Staatskapelle		
1989	Rafael Frühbeck de Burgos	London Symphony		
1990?	Charles Mackerras	Royal Liverpool Philharmonic Orchestra		
1990	Takashi Asahina	Kurashiki Musik Festival Orchestra		
1990	Vladimir Fedoseyev	Moscow Radio & TV Orchestra		
1990	Alberto Delande	Süddeutsche Philharmonie		
1991	Henry Adolph	Süddeutsche Philharmonie		
1991	Nikolaus Harnoncourt	Chamber Orchestra of Europe		
1991	Klaus Tennstedt	London Philharmonic		
1991	Zdeněk Košler	Slovak Philharmonic		
1991	Kurt Masur	Leipzig Gewandhaus		
1991	Frank Beermann	North German Chamber Symphony		
1992	Jukka-Pekka Saraste	Scottish Chamber Orchestra		
1992	Carlo Maria Giulini	La Scala Philharmonic, Milan		
1992	Herbert Blomstedt	San Francisco Symphony		
1993	Kirill Kondrashin	Royal Concertgebouw Orchestra		(live)
1993	James Levine	Metropolitan Opera Orchestra		
1993	John Eliot Gardiner	Orchestre Révolutionnaire et Romantique		
1993	Wolfgang Sawallisch	Royal Concertgebouw Orchestra		
1993	Otmar Suitner	Berlin Staatskapelle		
1993	Richard Hickox	Northern Sinfonia		
1993	Colin Davis	Dresden Staatskapelle		
1993	Giuseppe Sinopoli	Israel Philharmonic		
1994	Alexander Titov	St Petersburg Conservatory Orchestra		
1994	Yehudi Menuhin	Sinfonia Varsovia		
1994	Dennis Russell Davies	Bonn Beethovenhalle Orchestra		
1994	Jordi Savall	Le Concert des Nations		
1994	Peter Maag	Orchestra di Padova e del Veneto		
1994	Günther Herbig	BBC Philharmonic		
1994	Carlo Maria Giulini	Vienna Philharmonic		(live)
1994	Günther Herbig	Royal Philharmonic		
1994	Jaap Schroder	Smithsonian Chamber Orchestra		
1995	Béla Drahos	Nicolaus Esterházy Sinfonia (Budapest)		
1995	Peter Tiboris	Bohuslav Martinů Philharmonic		(with Mahler's orchestral re-touches)
1995	Stephen Kovacevich	BBC Philharmonic		
1995	Heinrich Schiff	Deutsche Kammerphilharmonie Bremen		
1996	Marc Soustrot	Bonn Beethovenhalle Orchestra		
1996	Antonino Polizzi	Budapest Symphony Orchestra		
1996	Takashi Asahina	Osaka Philharmonic		
1998	David Zinman	Tonhalle-Orchester Zürich		
1999	Walter Attanasi	Camerata Cassovia		
2000	Michael Gielen	Southwest German Radio Symphony		
2000	Claudio Abbado	Berlin Philharmonic		
2000	Daniel Barenboim	Berlin Staatskapelle		
2000	Djansug Kakhidze	Tbilisi Symphony Orchestra		
2001	Claudio Abbado	Berlin Philharmonic		('Rome' set)
2002	Jaap van Zweden	Hague Residentie Orchestra		
2002	Roger Norrington	Stuttgart Radio Symphony Orchestra		
2004	Vladimir Fedoseyev	Moscow RTV Symphony Orchestra		
2005	Osmo Vänskä	Minnesota Orchestra		
2005	Andrew Manze	Helsingborg Symphony Orchestra		
2005	John Eliot Gardiner	Orchestre Révolutionnaire et Romantique		
2005	Riccardo Chailly	Leipzig Gewandhaus Orchestra		
2005	Helmut Müller-Brühl	Kölner Kammerorchester		
2005	Stanislaw Skrowaczewski	Saarbrücken Radio Symphony Orchestra		
2006	Thomas Dausgaard	Swedish Chamber Orchestra		
2006	Michael Tilson Thomas	San Francisco Symphony		
2006	Kent Nagano	Deutsches Symphonie-Orchester Berlin		
2006	Daniel Grossmann	Ensemble 28		
2006	Alexander Rudin	"Musica Viva" Academic Chamber Orchestra		
2006	Bernard Haitink	London Symphony Orchestra		
2006	Jos van Immerseel	Anima Eterna		
2006	Charles Mackerras	Scottish Chamber Orchestra		
2007	Bertrand de Billy	Vienna Radio Symphony Orchestra		
2007	Gustav Kuhn	Haydn Orchestra of Bolzano & Trento		
2007	Gustavo Dudamel	Simón Bolívar Symphony Orchestra of Venezuela		
2008	Philippe Herreweghe	Royal Flemish Philharmonic		
2008	Paavo Järvi	Deutsche Kammerphilharmonie		
2008	Eduardo Chibas	Venezuela Symphony Orchestra		
2009	Seiji Ozawa	Saito Kinen Orchestra		
2009	Sylvain Cambreling	SWR Symphony Orchestra Baden-Baden & Freiburg		
2009	Christoph von Dohnányi	Philharmonia Orchestra		
2009	Jean-Philippe Tremblay	Orchestre de la Francophonie Canadienne		
2010	Emmanuel Krivine	La Chambre Philharmonique		
2011	Frans Brüggen	Orchestra of the Eighteenth Century		
2011	Frans Brüggen	Orchestra of the Eighteenth Century		(live, Rotterdam)
2011	Kent Nagano	Montreal Symphony Orchestra		
2011	Alexander Jero	studio orchestra		
2012	Gustavo Dudamel	Simón Bolívar Symphony Orchestra of Venezuela		
2012	Mikhail Pletnev	Russian National Orchestra		
2012	Mariss Jansons	Bavarian Radio Symphony		
2012	Daniel Barenboim	West-Eastern Divan Orchestra		
2012	Bruno Weil	Tafelmusik Baroque Orchestra		
2012	Beatrice Venezi	Lucca Philharmonic Orchestra		
2013	Claudio Abbado	Lucerne Festival Orchestra		
2013	Rafael Frühbeck de Burgos	Danish Radio Symphony Orchestra		
2015	Gabriel Feltz	Stuttgart Philharmonic		
