= Transition from Classical to Romantic music =

Period of change in European Art music

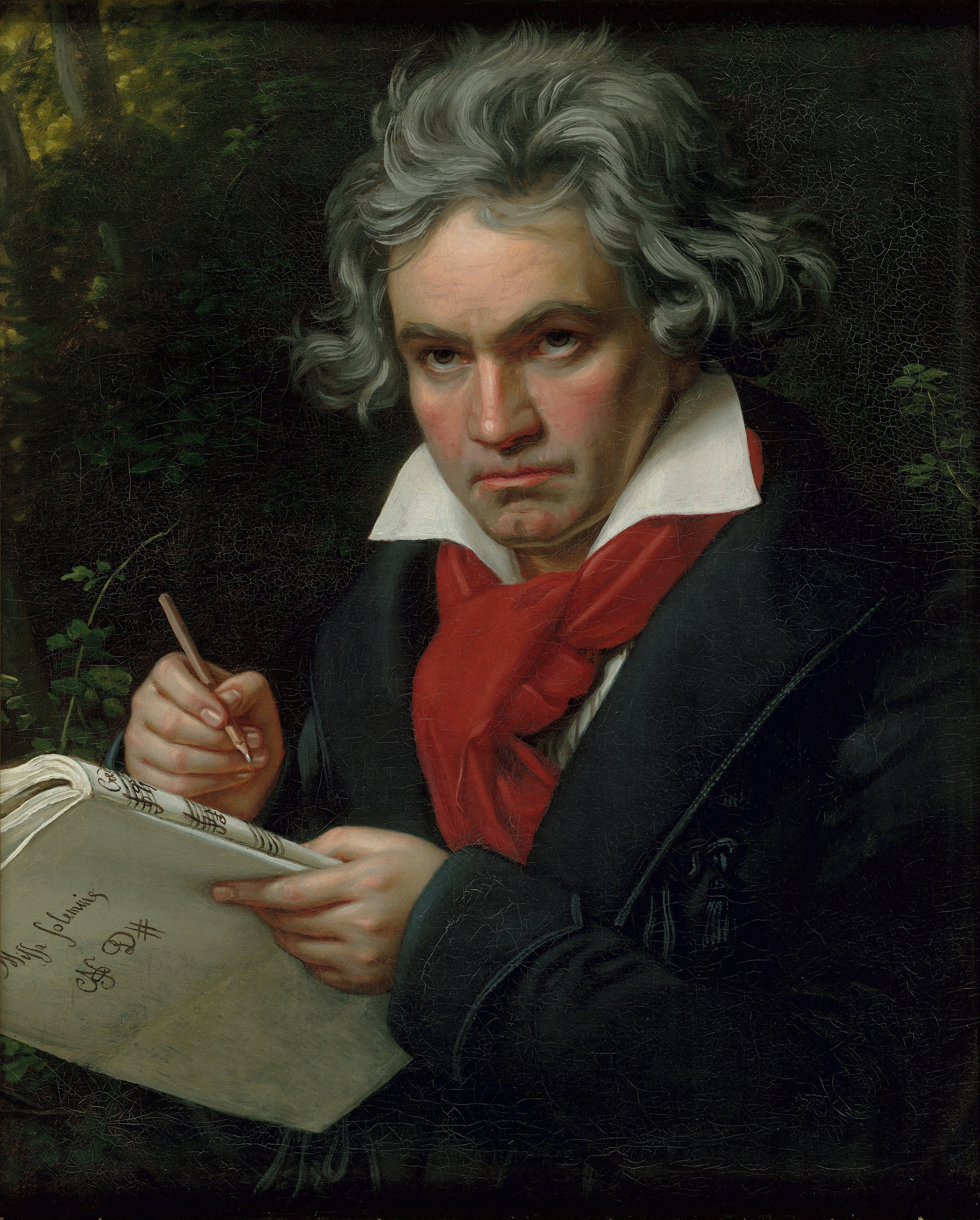
Ludwig van Beethoven, by Joseph Karl Stieler, 1820

There was a transition from the Classical period of European Art music, which lasted around 1750 to 1820, to Romantic music, which lasted around 1800 to 1910.

== Contrast between Classical and Romantic styles ==
Classical music was known for its clarity and regularity of structure, or "Natural Simplicity", thought of as an elegant international musical style with balanced four-bar phrases, clear-cut cadences, repetition, and sequence. Sonata form was the foundation for a large number of pieces which provided a foundation for the new era of Romanticism.

Characterized by lyrical melodies, chromaticism and dissonance, and dramatic dynamics, the Romantic era evoked emotions assembled by sovereign story lines and nationalist marches reflecting change. New musical vocabulary began to further develop using terms like "dolce" or "dolente", in addition to enriched harmonic and rhythmic language. Orchestral forms like the symphonic poem, choral symphony, and works for solo voice and orchestra, began to draw other art forms closer.

Romantic music was a self-conscious break from the ideals of the Age of Enlightenment as well as a reaction to socio-political desire for greater human freedom from despotism. The movement sought to express the liberty, fraternity, and equality which writers such as Heinrich Heine and Victor Hugo artistically defended by creating new lyric poetry. There was a new surrender to nature, nostalgia for the past, a turn towards the mystical, new attention to national identity, interest in the autobiographical, and a general discontentment with musical formulas and conventions exercised in Classical compositions. Conductors became the central figures in orchestral performances, responsible for the sonic flow of larger pieces.

== Stages of the transition ==
=== Sturm und Drang ===
The Sturm und Drang or "storm and stress" was a proto-Romantic movement that helped establish the aesthetics of the Romantic era. The movement attracted a number of young intellectuals, with Johann Wolfgang von Goethe becoming one of its central figures. Sturm und Drang challenged Enlightenment ideals through emotional intensity and individual expression. Emerging in the 1760s, although it began with political concerns, it became most influential in literature and later impacted visual art and music. It contrasted with the simple pieces of the Classical era into obvious and dramatic emotionalism sought by Romantic composers. Composers such as Haydn were fond of having compositional work reflect the turbulent political climate. This led to the creation of the Farewell Symphony No. 45 in F♯ Minor, containing several characteristics of this transition through long slow adagio and sharp turns to exemplify the demands of wavering opinions and philosophical themes taking place socially.

=== Main transition ===
The Industrial Revolution facilitated a dramatic expansion in orchestra size and greater diversity in instruments. The main transition was promoted by improvements to the piano, with cast-iron frames enabling thicker strings and deeper brilliant tones. Likewise, new instruments were created such as the ophicleide, and earlier instruments like the piccolo and English horn were improved, to contribute to the new dream-like interpretation of the past. New public concert halls accommodated the growing size of orchestras. It was during the main transitional period that a distinction between "highbrow" and "lowbrow" compositional works was established, with popular "light music" seen as entertainment and "art music" viewed as serious listening.

== Transitional artists, composers, and works ==
It was not until the end of the nineteenth century that the emergent discipline of Musikwissenschaft (musicology) began to identify which composers contributed to the transition between the Classical and Romantic eras. Wolfgang Amadeus Mozart, better known for composing classical music, incorporated opera, concerto, symphony, sonata, and string quartets which introduced Romantic qualities to music of the time.

The concept of programmatic music was prevalent among transitional pieces such as Ludwig van Beethoven's titles of Eroica and Pastoral symphonies, and his Sonata Pathetique. Giving compositions characteristic names was expanded upon by Romantic composers such as Richard Strauss and became standard.

Franz Schubert took part in the Classical to Romantic transition by being considered the last of the classical composers in his earlier instrumental pieces, and the first of the romantics through his 600 art songs that were melodic and harmonic.

After the transitional period, the virtuoso piano styles of the Romantics Frédéric Chopin and Franz Liszt were important to consolidating the Romantic movement.
