= Anton Eberl =

Austrian composer, teacher and pianist (1765–1807)

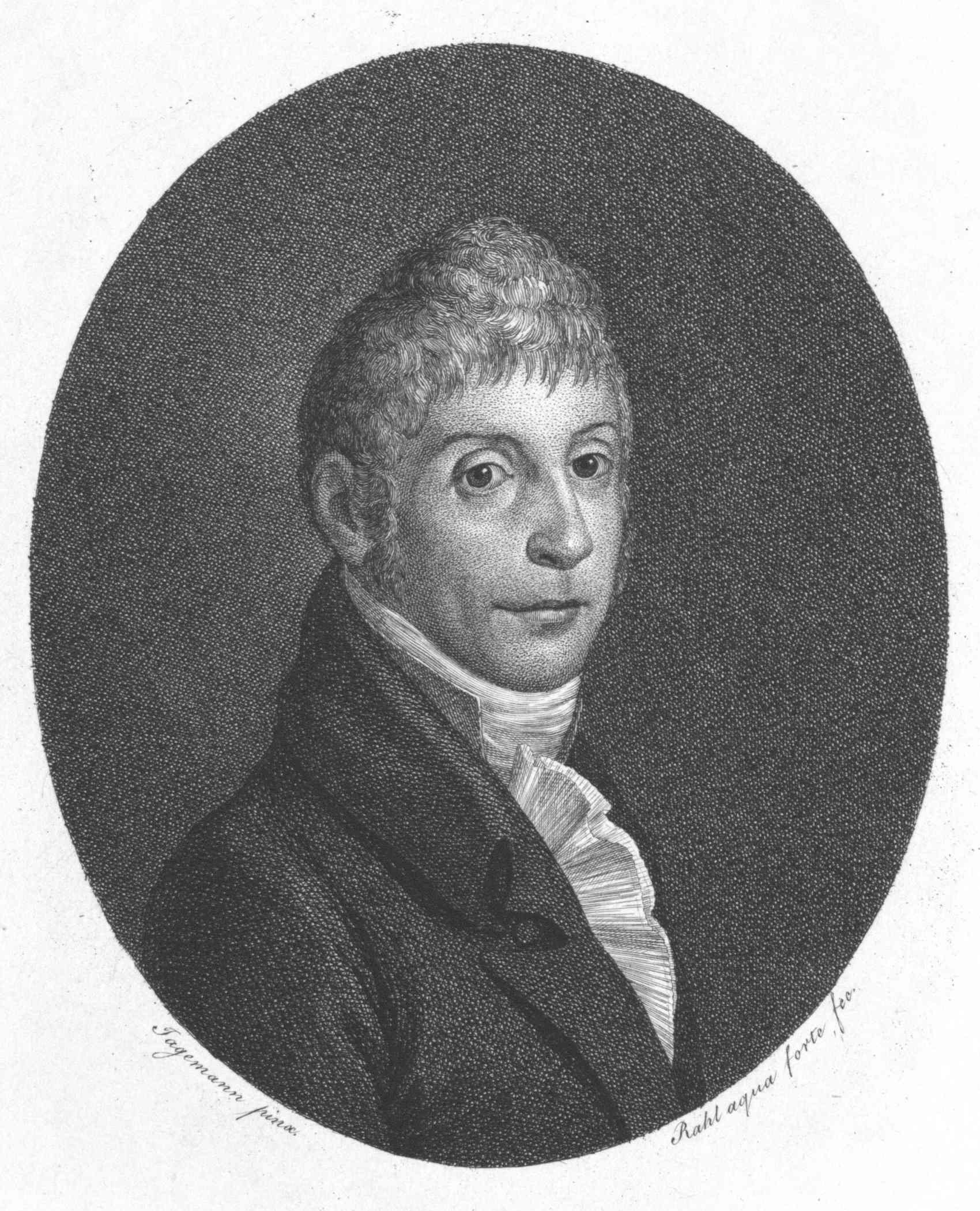

Anton Franz Josef Eberl (13 June 1765 – 11 March 1807) was an Austrian composer, teacher and pianist of the Classical period. He was a student of Salieri and Mozart. He was also seen as an early friend and rival of Beethoven.

== Biography ==
Eberl was born in Vienna, Austria in 1765, the son of a wealthy imperial official. He was a gifted pianist who gave recitals in Vienna from the age of eight. The family eventually fell into financial difficulties, so Eberl was unable to continue courses and training as a lawyer. Instead, he was then free to pursue his studies in music.

Eberl may have been taught by Mozart starting around 1781, when the famous composer arrived in Vienna. Stylistic similarities with Mozart led to several of Eberl's works being mistakenly published under Mozart's name. Eberl's cantata "Bei Mozarts Grabe", completed just six days after Mozart died in December of 1791, may well represent the homage of a student to his teacher and mentor.

Eberl maintained strong connections to the Mozart family, performing a Mozart piano concerto promoted by Mozart's wife Constanze in 1794, and accompanying her and her sister Aloysia Lange on a tour of Germany in the winter of 1795–96. One of Mozart's students, Josepha Auernhammer, had dedicated to her Eberl's Op. 16 Piano Sonata in C major. On 25 March 1803 she performed one of Eberl's piano concertos, perhaps his Op. 32 in C major, and on 2 March 1804 she performed Eberl's Piano Concerto in E♭, Op. 40. Clarinettist Anton Stadler, Mozart's friend for whom the composer wrote his clarinet quintet K. 581 and clarinet concerto K. 622, was one of the performers there for that same concert, playing on an Op. 43 Trio by Adalbert Gyrowetz. It is apparent that Eberl moved around freely within the Mozart circle.

Eberl married Maria Anna Sheffler in the spring of 1796 after returning from his tour with Constanze Mozart and Aloysia Lange. The Eberls then travelled to Saint Petersburg in Russia, where the composer worked as kapellmeister, pianist and teacher. He remained there until 1799, and established a fine reputation. The list of Saint Petersburg subscribers includes princes, princesses, counts and other important nobles. Back in Vienna, one of Eberl's subscribers was one of the most important composers at that time, Antonio Salieri, who was kapellmeister to the imperial court who in return gave Eberl advanced music lessons. About two-fifths of the Vienna subscribers were from the nobility, mostly music lovers, amateur performers, and patrons of the arts, including many writers and poets.

Eberl left Russia late in 1799, and by 1800 was back in Vienna. He tried his hand composing two stage works, "Erwine von Steinheim" and "Konigen der schwarzen Inseln". Both of these, however, did not prove to be very successful. By 1802, Eberl devoted himself to composing symphonies, concertos, and chamber music. In this five year period he enjoyed particular critical acclaim. A major concert tour of Germany in the first half of 1806, was to be Eberl's last, however. Commencing in Prague, he traveled to Dresden, Berlin, Leipzig, Weimar, Gotha, Frankfurt and Mannheim. He returned to Vienna, but in early 1807 Eberl contracted scarlet feve, and died on 11 March 1807.

A lengthy obituary that appeared on the front page of the Wiener Zeitung on 18 March 1807 stated: "What he was as an artist, what richness, depth and abundance characterized his compositions – all that has been determined by the critics. But how excellent his heart, how clear his mind, how unpretentiously cultured his works were – all that can only be known by those who knew him well and who loved the person in him as they respected the artist." Another publication, the Allgemeine Musikalische Zeitung of 1 April 1807 said the following: "Though not tall, Eberl was a well-built, handsome man ... he was exceptionally good-natured and sincere and of noble morality; his manners were polished, but not affected. If he had a fault worthy of censure, then it was his excess of goodness and guilelessness, which led him always to think the best of people. ... He was an exemplary husband, an unshakable friend and a generally popular addition to any gathering; seldom has the early death of an artist been so generally deplored."

== Style ==
Early in his career, Eberl's works were frequently passed off as having been composed by Mozart. Surprisingly, this elicited no protest from Mozart against the use of his name on Eberl's compositions. After Mozart's death, Eberl published in a widely read German newspaper a notice that stated, "However flattering it may be that even connoisseurs were capable of judging these works to be the products of Mozart, I can in no way allow the musical public to be left under this delusion." The worth of Eberl's compositions was widely acknowledged by contemporaries, and his works are mentioned alongside those of Joseph Haydn, Mozart, and Beethoven in contemporary concert reviews. Eberl’s Symphony in E♭ major (Opus 33), premiered at the same concert on 7 April 1805 as Beethoven's Eroica Symphony and written in the same key, received considerable praise, even as Beethoven's work was judged a difficult and problematic work. Eberl's "was extraordinarily pleasing, and really it has so much that is beautiful and powerful, handled with such genius and art, that its effect could hardly be lacking in any performance in which it were well rehearsed." After his death, however, Eberl fell into obscurity and his music was little performed.

== Influence ==
Eberl was a very close friend of Ludwig van Beethoven, whose symphonies show traces of Eberl's influence. For example, the coda of the finale of Eberl's E♭ symphony performed at the same concert in between Beethoven's First and newly composed Third ("Eroica," in the same key of E♭; see below) that drew high praise from a reviewer who (reflecting typical contemporary conservative criticism) thought much less of the "Eroica" (for its radical length and otherwise advanced style) ends with a descending bugle-call theme in dotted rhythm in E♭ that is more or less identical to the closing theme of the first movement of Beethoven's monumental Ninth (stated in B♭ at the end of the exposition leading into the development, and in D minor at the end of the recapitulation leading into the coda). Schubert performed pieces of Eberl at his Schubertiade.

== Compositions ==
- op 1: Piano Sonata in C minor (1792)
- op 4: Sechs deutsche Lieder for soprano and piano (1796)
- op 5: Sonatine for piano in C major (1796)
- op 6: Variations in D major on an andantino: Freudin saufter Herzenstriebe of Dittersdorf (1798)
- op 7: 2 Sonatas for piano with 4 hands: C major and F major (1797)
- op 8: 3 Trios for piano, violin, cello: 1 in E♭ major, 2 in B♭ major, 3 in C minor (1797)
- op 9: Theme and 11 variations in A minor on the song "Ascouta Jeannette" of the comedy "The two little Savoyards" by Nicolas Dalayrac (1799)
- op 10: 2 Trio Sonatas for piano, violin or clarinet, and cello ad libitum in A minor and B major (1799)
- op 11: Gloria d'Imeneo, cantata for soloists, choir and orchestra (1799)
- op 12: Great sonata characteristic for piano in F minor (1801)
- op 13: 3 String Quartets, in E♭, D major and G minor (1801)
- op 14: Sonata for piano and violin in D minor (1801)
- op 15: Fantasy and rondo for piano in B♭ major (1802)
- op 16: Great sonata in C major (1802)
- op 17: Variations on a Russian theme for cello and piano in C minor (1802)
- op 18: Quartet for piano, violin, viola and cello in C major (1802)
- op 19: Polonaise for piano four hands in B♭ major (1803)
- op 20: Sonata for piano and violin in D major (1803)
- op 21: Caprice and rondo in E♭ major (1803)
- op 23: Sech gesänge for soprano and piano (1804)
- op 24: Polonaise in D major for piano 4 hands (1804)
- op 25: Quartet for violin, viola, cello and piano in G minor (1809)
- op 26: Grand duet for piano and cello (or violin) in A major (1804)
- op 27: Great Sonata in G minor (1805)
- op 28: Fantasy for piano in D minor (1805)
- op 29: Sonata for flute and piano in G minor (1804)
- op 30: Amusement in E♭ major (1805)
- op 31: Prelude followed by VIII variations for 2 pianos in G major (1804)
- op 32: Concerto for piano and orchestra in C major (1803)
- op 33: Symphony in E♭ major (1803)
- op 34: Symphony in D minor (1804)
- op 35: Sonata for piano and violin in B♭ major (1805)
- op 36: Grand Trio for clarinet, cello and piano in E♭ major (1806)
- op 37: Serenade for 4-part choir, clarinet, viola and cello (1807)
- op 38: Caprice and rondo (same as op 21) (1803)
- op 39: Great sonata in G minor (1806)
- op 40: Concerto for piano and orchestra in E♭ major (v. 1803)
- op 41: Quintet for clarinet, violin, 2 violas and piano in G minor (1801)
- op 42: Caprice and rondo for piano with 4 hands in D major (1803)
- op 43: Great sonata in C major (1806)
- op 44: Trio Pot-Pourri for piano, clarinet and cello (1803)
- op 45: Concerto for 2 pianos and orchestra in B♭ major (v. 1803)
- op 46: Toccata for piano in C minor (1806)
- op 47: Sextet for piano, violin, viola, horn and clarinet in E♭ major (1796)
- op 48: Quintet for piano, oboe, violin, viola and cello in C major (1805)
- op 49: Sonata for piano and violin in F major (1792)
- op 50: Sonata for piano and violin in B♭ major (1795)
- Theme, variations and pastoral Rondo for harp on the allegro of Mozart's Divertimento K 563
- 12 Variations on Bei Mannern, welche Liebe fühlen of the Magic Flute, for piano (Won 3)
- 10 Variations on Zu Steffen Sprach im Träume (attributed to Mozart) (Won 2)
- 12 Variations on Freudin sanfter Herzenstriebe (attributed to Mozart) (Won 4)
- Trio for piano, violin, cello in C major (attributed to Mozart) (1797)
- Concerto for recorder and orchestra in G major
- Concerto for Piano and Orchestra in B♭ major (Won 9 1793)
- Symphonies in D major (Won 5), in G major (Won 6) in C major Won 7) (1783/85)
- Quartet for piano and strings in G minor (1804)
- Bei Mozart's Grabe, cantata for soloists, choir and orchestra (Won 8, 1791)
- In questa fell oscura, arietta for voice and piano (WoO 10, 1807)
- 12 deutsche Tänze, 12 Menuetten for keyboard (1805)
- March (1807)

=== Opéras ===
- Les Bohémiens (Die Zigeuner), Komische Oper in drei Akten w.o.n. 22 (1781), verloren
- Graf Balduin, Komische Oper in zwei Akten w.o.n. 20 (1785), verloren
- Die Marchande des Modes, Singspiel in drei Akten w.o.n. 19 (spätestens 1787), Libretto erhalten
- Die Hexe Megäre, w.o.n. 21 (1790), verloren
- Pyramus und Thisbe, Melodram in einem Akt w.o.n. 23 (1794), Libretto erhalten
- Der Tempel der Unsterblichkeit, Allegorischer Prolog w.o.n. 24 (1799), verloren
- Die Königin der schwarzen Inseln, Zauberoper in zwei Akten w.o.n. 1 (1801)
- Erwine von Steinheim, Parodie in drei Akten w.o.n. 25 (1801); Libretto erhalten

== Recordings ==
Many of Eberl's 200 compositions are lost. His chamber music has continued to receive contemporary performance. Three of his symphonies have been recorded by Concerto Köln in 1999. Two of his piano concertos, op 32 & 40, were recorded in 2011 for CPO by Die Kölner Akademie under Michael Alexander Willens with Paolo Giacometti and Riko Fukuda as soloists. His concerto for two pianos op. 45 was recorded by the same ensemble and was released in 2018.
