= Eroica Variations =

Composition by Ludwig van Beethoven

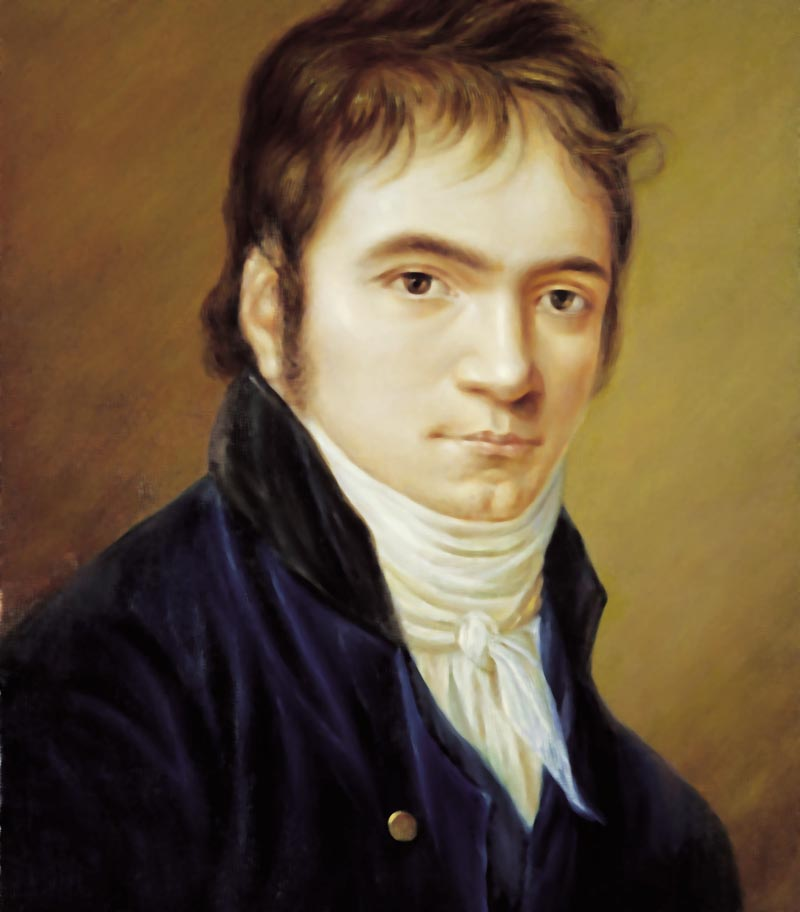
Beethoven by Christian Horneman, c. 1803

Eroica variations, Op. 35
Performed by Stefano Ligoratti

The Variations and Fugue for Piano in E♭ major, Op. 35 are a set of fifteen variations (plus three "bonus" variations) for solo piano composed by Ludwig van Beethoven in 1802. They are commonly referred to as the Eroica Variations because a different set of variations on the opening bass line section were used as the finale of his Symphony No. 3 Eroica composed the following year.

Musicologists Leon Plantinga and Alexander Ringer claim that the inspiration for the Eroica theme may have come from Classical era composer Muzio Clementi. Plantinga theorizes that a source may be Clementi's Piano Sonata in F minor, Op. 13, No. 6 (composed in 1784), where the first seven or eight notes of the Eroica theme can be matched, with a simpler rhythm, with the beginning of the third movement (in a minor key), and later to the melody in a major key (the Eroica theme is in a major key, although there are variations in minor keys). Ringer points to the first movement of the Piano Sonata in G minor, Op. 7, No. 3 (composed in 1782) as a possible source, where the melody (in a minor key) and rhythm closely match the first eight bars of the Eroica theme (a major version also exists in the movement, matching very closely the melody in the major key from the F minor, Op. 13, No. 6 sonata).

The theme was a favourite of Beethoven's. He had used it in the finale of the ballet music he composed for The Creatures of Prometheus (1801), as well as for the seventh of his 12 Contredanses, WoO 14 (1800-02), before being the subject of the variations of this work and of the later symphony. It begins thus:

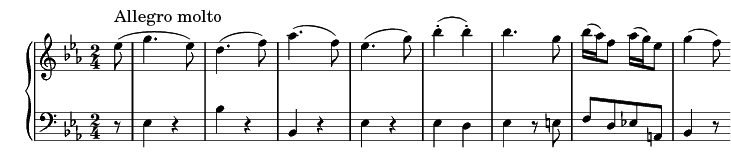

In a departure from the classical theme-and-variations form, Beethoven opens the work not with the main theme, but the bass line to the main theme. He then follows with three variations of this bass line before finally stating the main theme. This approach was carried over from the ballet music, where it represented the gradual creation of life forms by Prometheus. The variations in the Eroica Symphony follow this same pattern. In another departure from traditional variation form, after the fifteen variations of the main theme, Beethoven finishes the work with a finale consisting of a fugal variation followed by two more variations marked Andante con moto.
