= Symphony No. 3 (Beethoven) =

1803/1805 composition by Ludwig van Beethoven

- Eroica
- by Ludwig van Beethoven
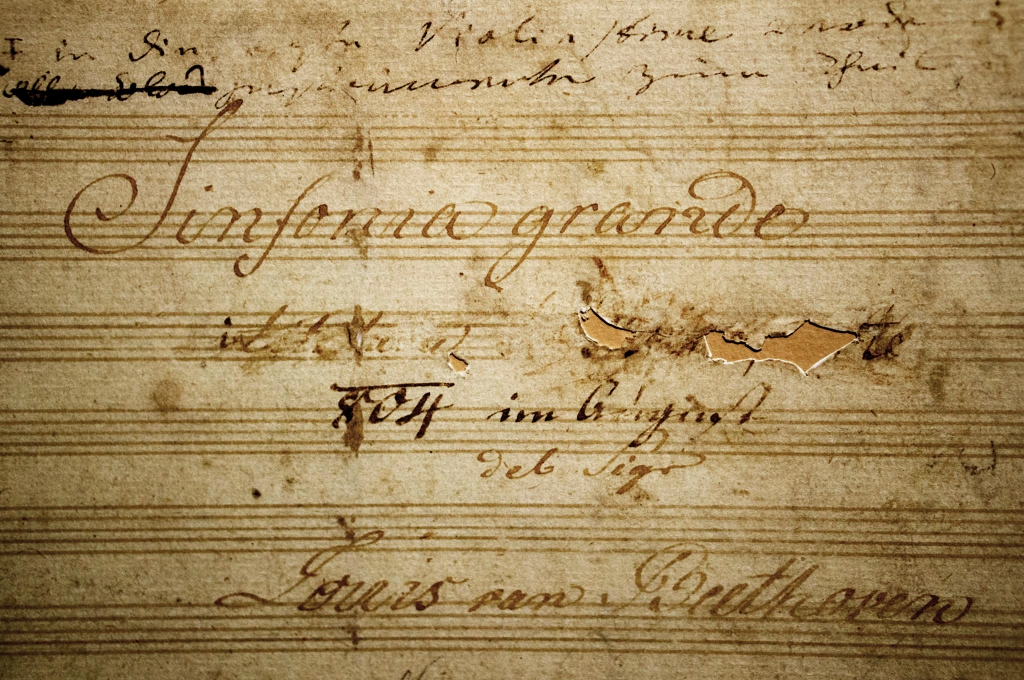
- Beethoven's title page which shows his erasure of dedication of the work to Napoleon
- Key: E♭ major
- Opus: 55
- Composed: 1802–1804
- Dedication: Napoleon Bonaparte, later retracted upon Napoleon's crowning himself Emperor
- Duration: c. 50 minutes
- Movements: 4
- Scoring: Orchestra

Premiere
- Date: 7 April 1805
- Location: Theater an der Wien, Vienna
- Conductor: Ludwig van Beethoven

The Symphony No. 3 in E♭ major, Op. 55, titled as the Eroica Symphony, is a symphony in four movements by Ludwig van Beethoven.

One of Beethoven's most celebrated works, the Eroica symphony is a large-scale composition that marked the beginning of the composer's innovative "middle period".

Composed mainly in 1803–1804, the work broke boundaries in symphonic form, length, harmony, emotional and cultural content. It is widely considered a landmark in the transition between the Classical and the Romantic era. It is also often considered to be the first Romantic symphony. Beethoven first conducted a private performance on 9 June 1804, and later the first public performance on 7 April 1805.

== Instrumentation ==
The Symphony is scored for:

Woodwinds
2 flutes
2 oboes
2 clarinets in B♭
2 bassoons

Brass
3 horns in E♭ (1 & 2 in C in mvt 2)
2 trumpets in E♭ & C

Percussion
timpani (in B♭–E♭ in mvts 1, 3, 4; G-C in mvt 2)

Strings
violins I, II
violas
cellos
double basses

== Form ==
I. Allegro con brio

II. Marcia funebre: Adagio assai

III. Scherzo: Allegro vivace

IV. Finale: Allegro molto
Performed by Czech National Symphony Orchestra (2012).

The work is in 4 movements:

1. Allegro con brio (12–19 min.) (E♭ major)
2. Marcia funebre: Adagio assai (12–18 min.) (C minor)
3. Scherzo: Allegro vivace (5–6 min.) (E♭ major)
4. Finale: Allegro molto (9–13 min.) (E♭ major)

Depending upon the conductor's style and observation of the exposition repeat in the first movement, the typical performance time is between 45 and 55 minutes.

=== I. Allegro con brio ===
The opening tutti chords

The 1st movement, in 3/4 time, is in sonata form, with typical performances between 12 and 18 minutes long depending on interpretation and whether the exposition repeat is played. Unlike the longer adagio introductions in Beethoven's first two symphonies, the movement opens with two loud E♭ major chords, played by the whole orchestra, that establish the tonality of the movement.

The conductor Kenneth Woods has noted that the opening movement of Eroica was inspired by and modeled on Mozart's Symphony No. 39, and shares many attributes of that earlier symphony which precedes this one by a decade and a half.

==== Exposition ====
Main theme of the first movement and its constituent motifs

The exposition has three thematic groups with varying interpretations of functionality.

1. First group (measures 3 to 44, E♭ major)
2. Second group (measures 45 to 83, B♭ major)
3. Third group (measures 84 to 155, B♭ major)

The exposition begins with the cellos introducing the first theme. By the fifth bar of the melody (m. 7), a chromatic note (C♯) is introduced, thus introducing the harmonic tension of the work. The melody is finished by the first violins, with a syncopated series of Gs (which forms a tritone with C♯ of the cellos and a diminished chord). This resolves to the dominant of the relative minor (G/C minor) before a short cadential codetta in E♭ major. The first theme is then transferred to wind instruments, then fragmented, moving through other keys with the b motif in canon and interchanged with a hemiola in the dominant, later moving between dominant and tonic. The main theme is finally restated with full orchestra in a and b before modulating to F major and the dominant B♭ in group 2.

Principal theme of second group

The modulation to the dominant key of B♭ appears at mm. 42 to 44, although it is not yet fully stabilized and entrenched. Here follows a group of three or two subjects: a lyrical downward motif (mm. 45 to 56) in canon between oboe, clarinet, flute, and violin; a short upward scale motif (mm. 57 to 64) in strings with a variation; and a section beginning with rapid downward patterns in the violins (mm. 65 to 82). (Note: Bernstein identifies three subjects, while George Grove identifies two.)

The third theme of the second group eventually leads to a lyrical theme (m. 83), whose second half of the theme eventually builds to a loud melody (m. 109) that draws upon the earlier downward motif (m. 113). The climactic moment of the exposition arrives when the music is interrupted by 6 consecutives sforzando hemiola chords (mm. 128 to 131). Later, and following the concluding chords of the exposition (mm. 144 to 148), the main theme returns in a brief codetta (m. 148) that transitions into the repeat / development.

The status of these groups is debated as to which is more important in the structure. In the traditional analysis, the three early motifs are transitional subjects to arrive at the "unusually late" lyrical theme. An alternative analysis holds that the second theme begins earlier at m. 45 with the downward motif. In this view, the traditional harmonic progression of the exposition ends at m. 82, with the new lyrical theme at m. 83 beginning an extension. This pattern would be consistent with that found later in the development, in which the climactic moment leads to a new lyrical theme that launches an extended section. Moreover, the downward motif theme (m. 45) is developed significantly in the next section while the lyrical theme (m. 83) does not appear. The early modulation to B♭ had been present in early drafts of the symphony, as was the indecisive nature of the second group.

Commenters have also observed that the sonata form and orchestration transitions would be fully preserved by cutting the third group (m. 83 to 143). However, others have observed that form and orchestration would also be fully preserved if the second and third subjects of the second group were cut instead (mm. 57 to 82), consistent with the traditional analysis.

==== Development ====
The development section (m. 154), (Note: Measure numbers in this article follow the traditional system, in which the measures of first endings are not counted.) like the rest of the movement, is characterized by harmonic and rhythmic tension from dissonant chords and long passages of syncopated rhythm.

The first section of the development is based around various thematic explorations and counterpoint, including a new scalar figure in bars 165 to 173 and a fugato derived from the main theme of the second group (mm. 236 to 246). The music eventually breaks into a 32-bar passage (mm. 248 to 279) of sforzando chords including both 2-beat and 3-beat downward patterns, culminating in crashing dissonant forte chords (mm. 276 to 279). Commenters have stated that this "outburst of rage ... forms the kernel of the whole movement", and Beethoven reportedly got out in his beat when conducting the orchestra in Christmas 1804, forcing the confused players to stop and go back.

New theme in development

Rather than leading to the recapitulation at this point, a new theme in E minor is then introduced instead (m. 284), beginning the second section of the development. This eventually leads to a near-doubling of the development's length, in like proportion to the exposition.

At the end of the development, one horn famously appears to come in early with the main theme in E♭ (mm. 394 and 395), while the strings continue playing the dominant chord. In the 19th century, this was thought to be a mistake; some conductors assumed the horn notes were written in the tenor clef (B♭–D–B♭–F) while others altered the second violin harmony to G (chord of the tonic), an error that eventually appeared in an early printed version. However, Beethoven's secretary, Ferdinand Ries, shared this anecdote about that horn entrance:

The first rehearsal of the symphony was terrible, but the hornist did, in fact, come in on cue. I was standing next to Beethoven and, believing that he had made a wrong entrance, I said, "That damned hornist! Can't he count? It sounds frightfully wrong." I believe I was in danger of getting my ears boxed. Beethoven did not forgive me for a long time.

==== Recapitulation ====
The recapitulation starts in the tonic E♭ major as expected, but then features a sudden excursion to F major early on before eventually returning to a more typical form in the tonic. The movement concludes in a long coda that reintroduces the new theme first presented in the development section.

=== II. Marcia funebre. Adagio assai ===
The second movement is a funeral march in the ternary form (A–B–A) that is typical of 18th-century funeral marches, albeit one that is "large and amply developed" and in which the principal theme has the functions of a refrain as in rondo form. However, it can also be analyzed as having five parts, a combination of ternary, rondo, and sonata form:

Principal theme

1. Exposition (mm. 1 to 68);
2. Trio in major (mm. 69 to 104), False recapitulation of march (mm. 105 to 113);
3. Central section or Development (mm. 114 to 172);
4. Recapitulation (mm. 173 to 208);
5. Coda (mm. 209 to 247).

Musically, the thematic solemnity of the second movement has lent itself for use as a funeral march, proper. The movement is between 14 and 18 minutes long.

The opening A-section in C minor begins with the march theme in the strings, then in the winds. A second theme (m. 17) in the relative major (E♭) quickly returns to minor tonality, and these materials are developed throughout the rest of the section. This eventually gives way to a brief B-section in C major (m. 69) "for what may be called the Trio of the March", which Beethoven unusually calls attention to by marking "Maggiore" (major) in the score.

At this point, the traditional "bounds of ceremonial propriety" would normally indicate a da capo return to the A theme. However, the first theme in C minor (m. 105) begins modulating in the 6th bar (m. 110), leading to a fugue in F minor (m. 114) based on an inversion of the original second theme. The first theme reappears briefly in G minor in the strings (m. 154), followed by a stormy development passage ("a shocking fortissimo plunge"). A full re-statement of the first theme in the original key then begins in the oboe (m. 173).

The coda (m. 209) begins with a marching motif in the strings that was earlier heard in the major section (at mm. 78, 100) and eventually ends with a final soft statement of the main theme (m. 238) that "crumbles into short phrases interspersed with silences".

=== III. Scherzo. Allegro vivace – Trio ===
Main theme of the third movement

The third movement is a lively scherzo with trio in rapid 3/4 time. It is between 5 and 6 minutes long.

The A theme of the outer scherzo section appears pianissimo in the dominant key of B♭ (mm. 7, 21), then piano in the secondary dominant key of F which is when the B part of the outer scherzo is heard (m. 41). This is followed by a pianissimo restart in B♭ (m. 73), which is when the A theme is heard again, leading to a full fortissimo statement in the tonic key of E♭ (m. 93). Later, a downward arpeggio motif with sforzandos on the second beat is played twice in unison, first by the strings (mm. 115 to 119) and then by the full orchestra (mm. 123 to 127). This is followed by a syncopated motif characterized by descending fourths (m. 143), leading to the repeat.

The trio section features three horns, the first time this had appeared in the symphonic tradition. The scherzo is then repeated in shortened form, except that very notably the second occurrence of the downward unison motif is changed to duple time (mm. 381 to 384). The movement ends with a coda (m. 423), with Beethoven marking the word in the score – which was unusual for him – that quickly builds from pianissimo to fortissimo, encapsulating the pattern of the whole movement.

=== IV. Finale. Allegro molto – Poco andante – Presto ===
Primary themes in movement 4

The fourth movement is a set of variations on a theme. It lasts between 10 and 14 minutes. The theme was previously used by Beethoven in earlier compositions and arguably forms the basis for the first three movements of the symphony as well (see Thematic Origins below), and the movement can be roughly divided into four parts:

1. Introduction on bass theme (mm. 1 to 75)
2. Theme and variations (mm. 76 to 380)
3. Reprise of the theme (mm. 381 to 430)
4. Coda (mm. 431 to 475)

While writing, Beethoven found himself having to reconcile the succession of the variations form with the processional sonata form found in the first movement. Thus, the final movement can be analyzed as a double variation form, with two themes (the bass theme and melody theme) being varied alternately with each other. Fabrizio Della Seta lays out the themes as such in the table:

Introduction	Theme	Var. I	Var. II	Var. III	Var. IV	Var. V	Var. VI	Coda
Bass Theme (BT)	Melody Theme (MT) + BT	BT (fugato)	MT	"March" theme over BT	MT + BT	Fugue on BT	MT	MT

The following table recounts multiple interpretations of the variations, although this list is not exhaustive:

Episode	Key	Measure	Fabrizio Della Seta	Elaine R. Sisman	Luigi Della Croce	Paolo Troncon	Marco Gozzi	Jordan Randall Smith
Bass theme	E♭ major	12–43	Bass theme	Theme A		Ostinato theme	Theme X	Theme
Variation a 3	E♭ major	44–59	Elaboration on bass theme	Variation A1	Variation I	Variation (with countersubject)	First variation of Theme X	Variation I
Variation a 4	E♭ major	60–75	Elaboration on bass theme	Variation A2	Variation II	Variation (with counterpoint)	Second variation of Theme X	Variation II
Melody theme	E♭ major	76–116	Melody theme	Theme B	Variation III	Variation (ostinato + foundational theme)	Theme A	Variation III
Fugato on bass theme	C minor	117–174	Variation I	Variation Ax	Variation IV	Fugue with 5 voices	Fugato on Theme X	Variation IV
Melody theme	D major	175–210	Variation II	Variation B1			First and second variations on Theme A	Variation V
March theme	G minor	211–257	Variation III	Variation A3		New theme on oboes and bassoons	New variation on themes A-X	Variation VI
Melody theme	C major C minor	258–276	Variation IV	Variation B2			Fourth variation of Theme A	Variation VII
Double fugue	E♭ major	277–348	Variation V	Variation Ax1		Fugue with 5 voices (inverted ostinato theme)	Fugal episode	Variation VII
"Poco andante"	E♭ major	349–380	Variation VI	Variation B3	Final variation (with new theme)	Theme (varied)	Fifth variation of Theme A	Variation VIII
Melody theme	E♭ major	381–396	Reprise	Variation B4		Reprise	Sixth variation of Theme A	Variation IX

After a short introduction on the tutti that begins with the mediant chord that transitions to the dominant seventh, the quiet theme, in E♭ major, first appears and then is subjected to a series of 10 variations:

- Variation 1: The 1st variation repeats the theme in "arco" while a new accompaniment is introduced. (E♭ major)
- Variation 2: The next variation, containing a new triplet accompaniment, leads to: (E♭ major)
- Variation 3: Where a new melody is introduced while the theme is still played on the bass. A brief transitional passage leads to: (E♭ major)
- Variation 4: In C minor, a fugue that starts quietly and suspensefully on the strings as it builds up to a dramatic and urgent climax. (See Beethoven and C minor.)
- Variation 5: The playful 5th variation is in D major, involving a statement of the theme where the bass instruments play the first clause of the first half in a minor mode, before correcting themselves and moving to the major for the second clause. The variation also includes two virtuosic solo passages for the flute which accompany the melodic line. This directly leads to:
- Variation 6: A stormy and raging variation in G minor, reminiscent of a Romani style dance.
- Variation 7: An incomplete variation, which begins with a simple restatement of the first half of the theme in C major, before an almost immediate switch back to the minor mode in order to bring the piece into:
- Variation 8: Another fugue, now it is bright and energized, as this time it is in the tonic (E♭ major) instead of the submediant. It builds up to a climax again; the orchestra pauses on the dominant of the home key, and the theme is further developed in:
- Variation 9: At this point, the tempo slows down to Poco Andante, and the piece becomes more serene and tranquil. The theme, first stated by an oboe and then by the strings, here is contemplative and wistful, bringing a greater sense of depth to what has been heard before. During the second half, another triplet accompaniment is introduced in the higher strings, while the melodies, played by the woodwinds, are made of syncopated 16th and 8th notes. (E♭ major)
- Variation 10: The final variation, which is when the "full image" of The Eroica is heard. Triumphant and heroic plunges are constantly heard on the tutti, with the triplet accompaniment from the previous variation still present, as the melody from the third variation, now victorious and energized, is heard on the brass. (E♭ major)

The symphony ends with a coda, which draws on all previous sections and variations of the movement. At the end of the coda, there is a "surprise", which is when the dynamic changes from pp on the flute, bassoon, and strings only to ff all of a sudden by a huge crash on the whole orchestra, as the tempo abruptly changes to Presto. A flurry of sforzandos appears, and the finale ends triumphantly with three large E♭ major chords on the tutti.

== History ==
Beethoven began composing the third symphony soon after Symphony No. 2 in D major, Opus 36 and completed the composition in early 1804. The first public performance of Symphony No. 3 was on 7 April 1805 in Vienna.

=== Thematic origins ===
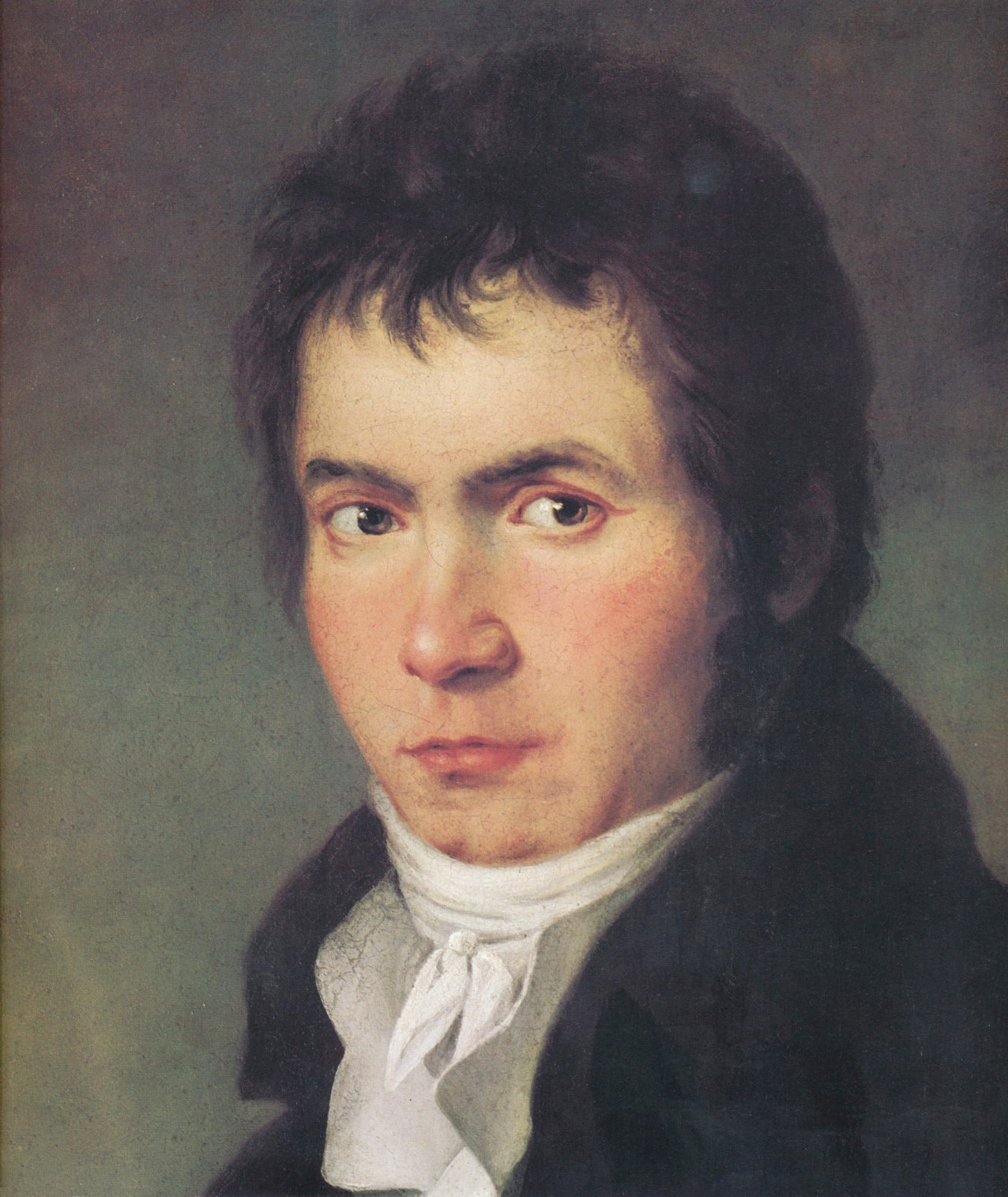
Beethoven most likely composed the Eroica in reverse order.

There is significant evidence that the Eroica, perhaps unlike Beethoven's other symphonies, was constructed back-to-front. The theme used in the fourth movement, including its bass line, originate from the seventh of Beethoven's 12 Contredanses for Orchestra, WoO 14, and also from the Finale to his ballet The Creatures of Prometheus, Op. 43, both of which were composed in the winter of 1800–1801. The next year, Beethoven used the same theme as the basis for his Variations and Fugue for Piano in E♭ Major, Op. 35, now commonly known as the Eroica Variations due to the theme's re-use in the symphony. It is the only theme that Beethoven used for so many separate works in his lifetime, and each use is in the same key of E♭ major.

The "Wielhorsky Sketchbook", Beethoven's principal sketchbook for 1802, contains a 2-page movement plan in E♭ major that directly follows the sketches for the Opus 35 Variations, which has been identified as being intended for the Third Symphony. (Note: Lewis Lockwood credits Nathan Fishman as being the first to identify this movement plan as being intended for the Third Symphony.) While the movement plan gives no explicit indication regarding the finale, Lewis Lockwood argues that "there cannot be any doubt that Beethoven intended from the start" to use the same theme (and bass of the theme) that he had just fleshed out in the Opus 35 Variations. Thus, it is argued that Beethoven's initial conception for a complete symphony in E♭ – including its first three movements – emerged directly from the Op. 35 Variations.

The first movement's main theme (mm. 3 to 6) has thus been traced back to the bass line theme of the Opus 35 variations (E♭, B♭↓, B♭↑, E♭) by way of intermediate versions found in one of Beethoven's sketchbooks. In the 2nd movement, the combined tonality (melody and bass) of the Opus 35 theme's first four bars – E♭, B♭↓, B♭7(A♭)↑, E♭ – appears in slightly altered form as the funeral's march's 2nd theme (E♭, B♭↓, A♭↑, E♮) (mvt. II, mm. 17 to 20), followed by two sudden forte B♭s that echoes later elements of the theme. That same tonality then appears unaltered as the scherzo's main theme (mvt. III, mm. 93 to 100).

Thus, the first 3 movements can be viewed as symphonic-length "variations" on the Opus 35 theme, ultimately anticipating the theme's appearance in the fourth movement. Moreover, Beethoven's choice to begin the symphony with a theme adapted from the bass line is also paralleled in the fourth movement, in which the bass theme is heard as the 1st variation before the main theme ultimately appears. This again parallels the structure of the Opus 35 variations themselves. Finally, the loud E♭ chord that begins the Opus 35 variations themselves is moved here to the beginning of the first movement, in the form of the two chords that introduce the first movement.

Alternatively, the first movement's resemblance to the overture to the comic opera Bastien und Bastienne (1768), composed by twelve-year-old W. A. Mozart, has been noted. It was unlikely that Beethoven knew of that unpublished composition. A possible explanation is that Mozart and Beethoven each coincidentally heard and learned the theme from elsewhere.

=== Dedication ===
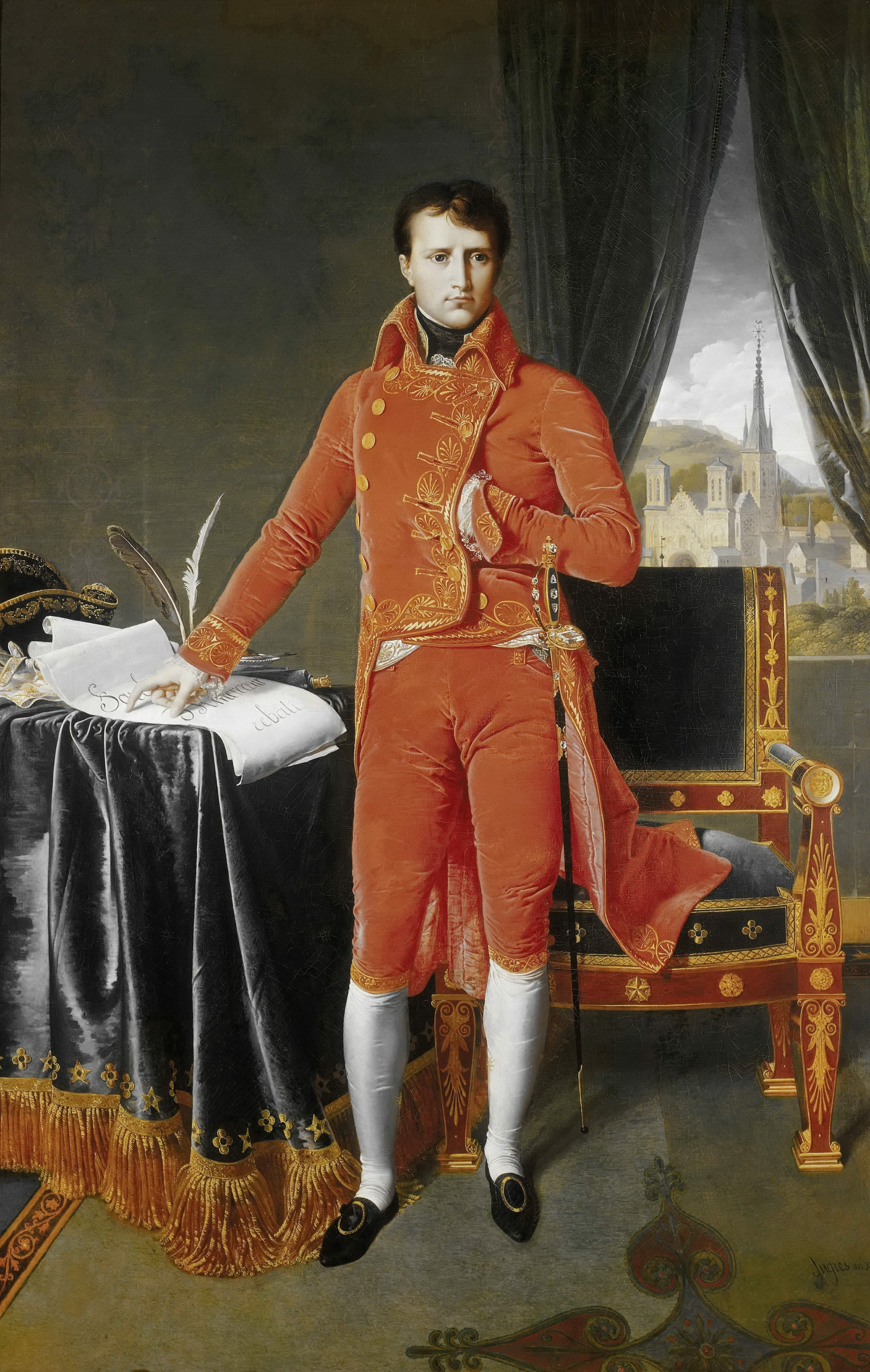
Beethoven originally dedicated the symphony to Napoleon Bonaparte (pictured: Bonaparte, First Consul, by Ingres), only to renege after the latter declared himself Emperor of the French.

Beethoven originally dedicated the 3rd symphony to Napoleon Bonaparte, who he believed embodied the democratic and anti-monarchical ideals of the French Revolution. In the autumn of 1804, Beethoven withdrew his dedication of the 3rd symphony to Napoleon, lest it cost him the composer's fee paid him by a noble patron; so, Beethoven re-dedicated his 3rd symphony to Prince Joseph Franz Maximilian Lobkowitz – nonetheless, despite such a bread-and-butter consideration, the politically idealistic Beethoven titled the work "Bonaparte". Later, about the composer's response to Napoleon having proclaimed himself Emperor of the French (14 May 1804), Beethoven's secretary, Ferdinand Ries said that:

In writing this symphony, Beethoven had been thinking of Bonaparte, but Bonaparte while he was First Consul. At that time Beethoven had the highest esteem for him and compared him to the greatest consuls of Ancient Rome. Not only I, but many of Beethoven's closer friends, saw this symphony on his table, beautifully copied in manuscript, with the word "Bonaparte" inscribed at the very top of the title-page and "Ludwig van Beethoven" at the very bottom ... I was the first to tell him the news that Bonaparte had declared himself Emperor, whereupon he broke into a rage and exclaimed, "So he is no more than a common mortal! Now, too, he will tread under foot all the rights of Man, indulge only his ambition; now he will think himself superior to all men, become a tyrant!" Beethoven went to the table, seized the top of the titlepage, tore it in half and threw it on the floor. The page had to be recopied, and it was only now that the symphony received the title Sinfonia eroica.

An extant copy of the score bears two scratched-out, hand-written subtitles; initially, the Italian phrase Intitolata Bonaparte ("Titled Bonaparte"), secondly, the German phrase Geschriben auf Bonaparte ("Written for Bonaparte"), 4 lines below the Italian subtitle. Three months after retracting his initial Napoleonic dedication of the symphony, Beethoven informed his music publisher that "The title of the symphony is really Bonaparte". In 1806, the score was published under the Italian title Sinfonia Eroica ... composta per festeggiare il sovvenire di un grande Uomo ("Heroic Symphony, composed to celebrate the memory of a great man").

=== Early performances and reviews ===
Composed from the autumn of 1803 until the spring of 1804, the earliest rehearsals and performances of the third symphony were private and took place in the Vienna palace of Beethoven's noble patron, Prince Lobkowitz. An account record dated 9 June 1804, submitted by the prince's Kapellmeister Anton Wranitzky, shows that the prince hired 22 extra musicians (including the third horn required for the Eroica) for two rehearsals of the work. The fee paid to Beethoven by Prince Lobkowitz would also have secured further private performances of the symphony that summer on his Bohemian estates, Eisenberg (Jezeří) and Raudnitz (Roudnice). The first public performance was on 7 April 1805, at the Theater an der Wien, Vienna; for which concert the announced (theoretical) key for the symphony was Dis (D♯ major, 9 sharps).

Reviews of the work's public premiere (on 7 April 1805) were decidedly mixed. The concert also included the premiere of a Symphony in E♭ major by Anton Eberl (1765–1807) that received better reviews than Beethoven's symphony. One correspondent describes the first reactions to the Eroica:

Musical connoisseurs and amateurs were divided into several parties. One group, Beethoven's very special friends, maintains that precisely this symphony is a masterpiece.... The other group utterly denies this work any artistic value ... [t]hrough strange modulations and violent transitions ... with abundant scratchings in the bass, with three horns and so forth, a true if not desirable originality can indeed be gained without much effort. ...The third, very small group stands in the middle; they admit that the symphony contains many beautiful qualities, but admit that the context often seems completely disjointed, and that the endless duration ... exhausts even connoisseurs, becoming unbearable to the mere amateur. To the public the symphony was too difficult, too long ... Beethoven, on the other hand, did not find the applause to be sufficiently outstanding.

One reviewer at the premiere wrote that "this new work of B. has great and daring ideas, and ... great power in the way it is worked out; but the symphony would improve immeasurably if B. could bring himself to shorten it, and to bring more light, clarity, and unity to the whole." Another said that the symphony was "for the most part so shrill and complicated that only those who worship the failings and merits of this composer with equal fire, which at times borders on the ridiculous, could find pleasure in it". But a reviewer just two years later described the Eroica simply as "the greatest, most original, most artistic and, at the same time, most interesting of all symphonies".

The finale in particular came in for criticism that it did not live up to the promise of the earlier movements. An early reviewer found that "[t]he finale has much value, which I am far from denying it; however, it cannot very well escape from the charge of great bizarrerie." Another agreed that "[t]he finale pleased less, and that "the artist often wanted only to play games with the audience without taking its enjoyment into account simply in order to unloose a strange mood and, at the same time, to let his originality sparkle thereby". An exhaustive review of the work in a leading music journal made an observation that may still be familiar to first-time listeners: "this finale is long, very long; contrived, very contrived; indeed, several of [its] merits lie somewhat hidden. They presuppose a great deal if they are to be discovered and enjoyed, as they must be, in the very moment of their appearance, and not for the first time on paper afterwards." A review of an 1827 performance in London wrote that this particular performance "most properly ended with the funeral march, omitting the other parts, which are entirely inconsistent with the avowed design of the composition".

=== Manuscripts and editions ===
The original autograph manuscript does not survive. A copy of the score with Beethoven's handwritten notes and remarks, including the famous scratched-out dedication to Napoleon on the cover page, is housed in the library of the Gesellschaft der Musikfreunde in Vienna. A first published edition (1806) of Beethoven's Eroica is on display at the Lobkowicz Palace in Prague.

Several modern scholarly editions have appeared in recent decades, including those edited by Jonathan Del Mar (published by Bärenreiter), Peter Hauschild (Breitkopf & Härtel), and Bathia Churgin (Henle).

== Assessment ==
=== Significance ===
The work is a milestone work in classical music; it is twice as long as the symphonies of Joseph Haydn and Wolfgang Amadeus Mozart – the first movement is almost as long as a Classical symphony (with repetition of the exposition). Thematically, it covers more emotional ground than Beethoven's earlier symphonies and thus marks a key milestone in the transition between Classicism and Romanticism that would define Western art music in the early decades of the nineteenth century.

The second movement especially displays a great emotional range, from the misery of the funeral march theme to the relative solace of happier, major-key episodes. The finale displays a similar emotional range and is given a thematic importance then unheard of. In earlier symphonies, the finale was a quick and breezy conclusion; here, the finale is a lengthy set of variations and a fugue.

=== Critical opinions and phrases ===
- Hector Berlioz discussed Beethoven's use of the horn and the oboe, in the Treatise on Instrumentation and Orchestration (1844, 1855).
- J. W. N. Sullivan said that the first movement expresses Beethoven's courage in confronting deafness; the second movement, slow and dirge-like, communicates his despair; the third movement, the scherzo, is an "indomitable uprising of creative energy"; and the fourth movement is an exuberant outpouring of energy.
- Richard Strauss presents themes similar to the funeral march, in Metamorphosen, Study for 23 Solo Strings (1945). Some academics say the 'In Memoriam' sub-title refers to Beethoven.
- Leonard Bernstein said the first two movements are "perhaps the greatest two movements in all symphonic music", in the recording Eroica (1953) and book The Infinite Variety of Music (1966).
- Gareth Jenkins said Beethoven was "doing for music what Napoleon was doing for society – turning tradition upside down" and embodied the "sense of human potential and freedom" of the French Revolution, in Beethoven's Cry of Freedom (2003).
- BBC Music Magazine called it the greatest symphony, based on a survey of 151 conductors in 2016.
- Alex Ross said that this symphony "knows which way you think the music is going and veers triumphantly in the wrong direction".

== Use as funeral music ==
The symphony's 2nd movement has been played as a funeral march at state funerals, memorial services, and commemorations including:

- the funeral of German composer Felix Mendelssohn, in 1847.
- the funeral of German Field Marshal Erwin Rommel, in 1944.
- to mourn the death of US President Franklin D. Roosevelt, in 1945.
- Bruno Walter performed the entire symphony as the memorial concert for conductor Arturo Toscanini, in 1957.
- to mourn U.S. President John F. Kennedy, in 1963.
- the funeral of the 11 Israeli athletes killed at the 1972 Summer Olympics.

== Cinema ==
Eroica, a film based in part on Ferdinand Ries' recollection of the symphony's 1804 premiere, was released in 2003.

== See also ==
- Symphony No. 1 (Brahms)
- Beethoven Symphony No. 3 discography
- Napoleon Symphony
