= Maria Casentini =

Austrian ballet dancer

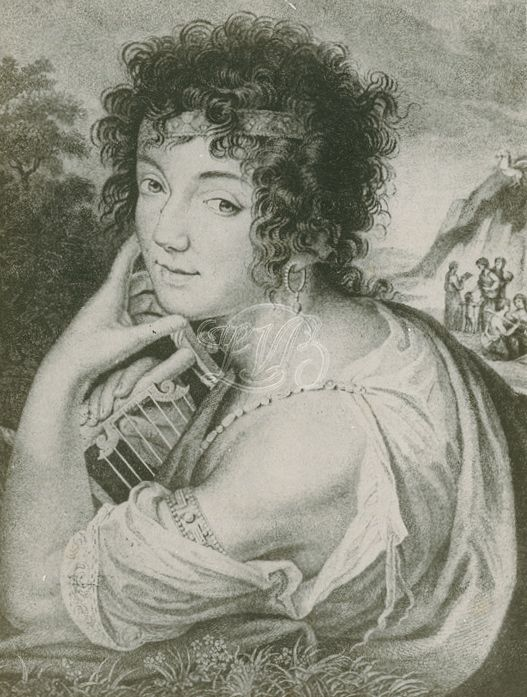
Maria Casentini

Maria Casentini (1778 – after 1805) was an Austrian ballet dancer. She was born in Lucca, at the time a free city-state in the Italian Peninsula.

She was engaged in Venice from 1788 to 1795 and at the Theater am Kärntnertor from 1796 to 1804 and internationally famous in her time. She is most known for her performance in Das Waldmädchen by Paul Wranitzky and Giuseppe Trafieri (1796), where she premiered the title role of the feral girl found in the forest by a Polish prince. In addition she danced the lead in Ludwig van Beethoven's Creatures of Prometheus Op. 43 which the Italian dancer Salvatore Vigano had commissioned for a premiere in March of 1801. She returned to the Vienna Court Theater for the seasons 1803-1805
