= Symphony in E-flat (Eberl) =

Symphony by Anton Eberl

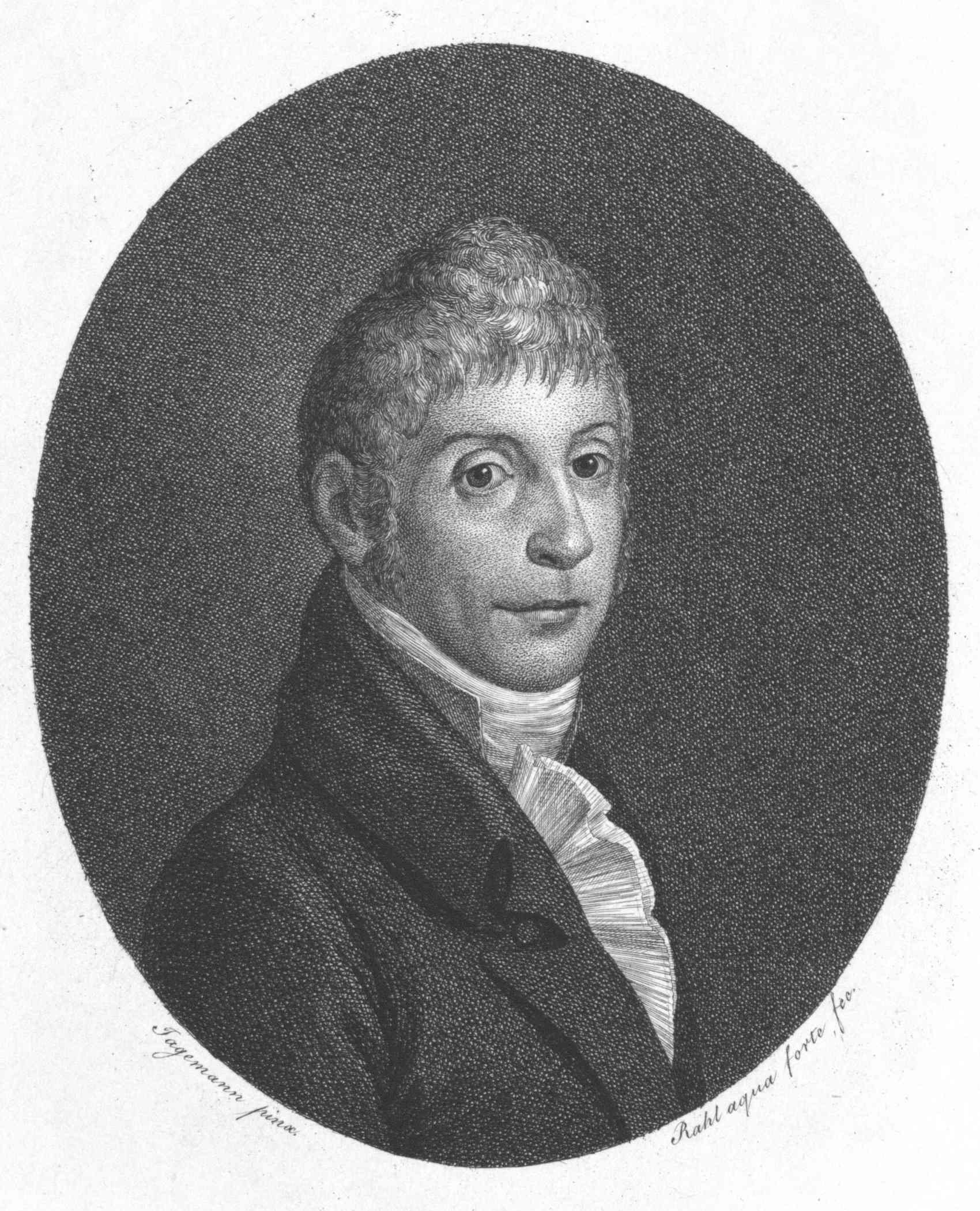
Anton Eberl

The Symphony in E♭, Opus 33 by the Viennese composer Anton Eberl (1765–1807) was written during the course of 1803. The premiere took place in Vienna, Austria on January 6, 1804. Also, at the same concert Eberl premiered his Piano Concerto in E♭, Op. 40, and his Concerto for Two Pianos in B♭, Op. 45. It is classical in style. The performance time is about 30 minutes. It is scored for 2 flutes, 2 oboes, 2 clarinets, 2 bassoons, 2 horns, 2 trumpets, timpani and strings. The work was dedicated by Eberl to Prince Lobkowitz, or Le Prince Regnant De Lobkowitz.

== Movements ==
There are four movements:

1. Andante sostenuto, 3/4 – Allegro con fuoco e vivace, 2/2 in E♭ major
2. Andante con moto, 2/4 in C minor
3. Menuetto e Trio, 3/4 in E♭
4. Finale: Vivace assai, 2/4 in E♭ major

== Early Performances and Reviews ==
The Viennese correspondent for the Allgemeine Musikzeitung (AMZ) wrote that this first performance “was extraordinarily well conceived, full of incisive and new ideas.” Historisches Taschenbuch mit besonderer Rücksicht auf die Österreichischen Staaten (‘Historical Pocketbook with Special Focus on the Austrian States’) states: "Among the great instrumental compositions of this year, the first place belongs to the symphonies and concerti of Eberl [... who] had in a great concert at the beginning of 1804 for the first time stepped before the public with large compositions. Brilliance, fire, affect and knowledge of instruments already distinguished the first symphony in E flat advantageously."

=== Comparisons to Premiere of Beethoven's Eroica Symphony ===
It was performed again a year later on January 20, 1805, at a semi-public Sunday concert organized by the Viennese banker Joseph Würth, in direct competition with the first performance of Beethoven’s Eroica Symphony (his Symphony No.3 in the same key of E♭ major, Op. 55), a critic for the AMZ observed that the Eberl symphony was "extraordinarily pleasing, and really it has so much that was beautiful and powerful” and the symphony was “handled with so much genius and art, that it would be difficult for it ever to fail if it had been well rehearsed. It turned out exceptionally well, full of sharply profiled and new ideas. May this symphony soon be published and widely disseminated, and Mr. Eberl continue to devote his talents to this genre." However, the same reviewer, who professed to be a strong advocate of Beethoven, criticized Beethoven’s Eroica, finding in it “too much that was shrill and bizarre, which makes an overview extremely difficult and thus unity almost is entirely lost.” In the first completely public performance of the Eroica on April 7, 1805 the reviewer stated the Eroica contained “very daring ideas... and was very powerfully carried out” but he also noted the “inordinate length and extreme difficulty of execution.” He continued: “There is no lack of striking and beautiful passages in which the force and talent of the author are obvious; but on the other hand the work seems often to lose itself in utter confusion. … The Symphony would gain immensely if Beethoven would decide to shorten it and introduce into the whole more light, clarity and unity... There were very few people who liked the symphony.” The performance of the Eroica was close to one hour in length, whereas the Eberl symphony was about 30 minutes long.

=== More Reviews of Eberl's Symphony ===
On April 10, 1806, Eberl's Op. 33 Symphony was performed in Leipzig at the Gewandhaus. A review in the AMZ reported that the "great symphony is a multifaceted, brilliant, especially well-sounding fiery instrumental piece, and was received by the whole auditorium with great applause". It was performed again in Leipzig on December 4, 1806, and it earned renewed praise: “Eberl's Symphony in E-flat pleases us ever more by repeated hearings, and it must be heard often until one is a master over it, and can completely appreciate it...It is full of fire, luster, and wealth of invention. It makes a very strong impression. We do not doubt at all that this symphony, where it is well performed, will achieve respect and lively effect, and also bring real honor to Mr. Eberl."

== Discography ==
Various works by composers Dall'Abaco, Locatelli, Cannabich, Carl Stamitz, Fils, Fränzl, Johann Baptist Wanhal, Leopold Kozeluch and Anton Eberl by Concerto Köln (Orchestra) Teldec 2564698899 (6 CD) (One CD contains three Symphonies by Eberl)
