= The Rapids-Rider's Brides =

Patriotic cantata by Jean Sibelius (1906)

- Orchestral song by Jean Sibelius
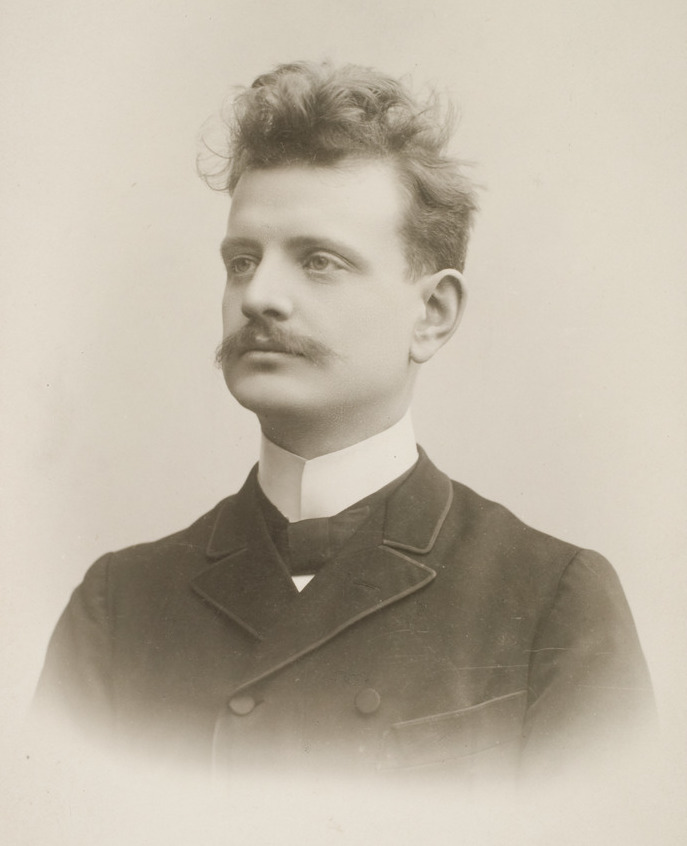
- The young composer (c. 1896)
- Native name: Koskenlaskijan morsiamet
- Opus: 33
- Text: Koskenlaskijan morsiamet, by A. Oksanen
- Language: Finnish
- Composed: 1897, transcribed 1897–1899, arranged 1943
- Publisher: Fazer & Westerlund (1899) (Note: On 20 July 1905, the Helsinki-based music publisher Fazer & Westerlund (Helsingfors Nya Musikhandel) sold its Sibelius holdings (the publishing rights and printing plates) to the German firm Breitkopf & Härtel.)
- Duration: ~9 minutes

Premiere
- Date: 1 November 1897
- Location: Helsinki, Grand Duchy of Finland
- Conductor: Jean Sibelius
- Performers: Helsinki Philharmonic Society; Abraham Ojanperä (baritone)

The Rapids-Rider's Brides (Finnish: Koskenlaskijan morsiamet; sometimes translated as The Ferryman's Brides or The Rapids-Shooter's Brides), Op. 33, is a song for baritone (or mezzo-soprano) and orchestra, composed in 1897 by Finnish composer Jean Sibelius.

Sibelius later created two arrangements of The Rapids-Rider's Brides: first, a version for voice and piano (1897–1899), and later, an arrangement for male choir and orchestra (1943).

== Instrumentation ==
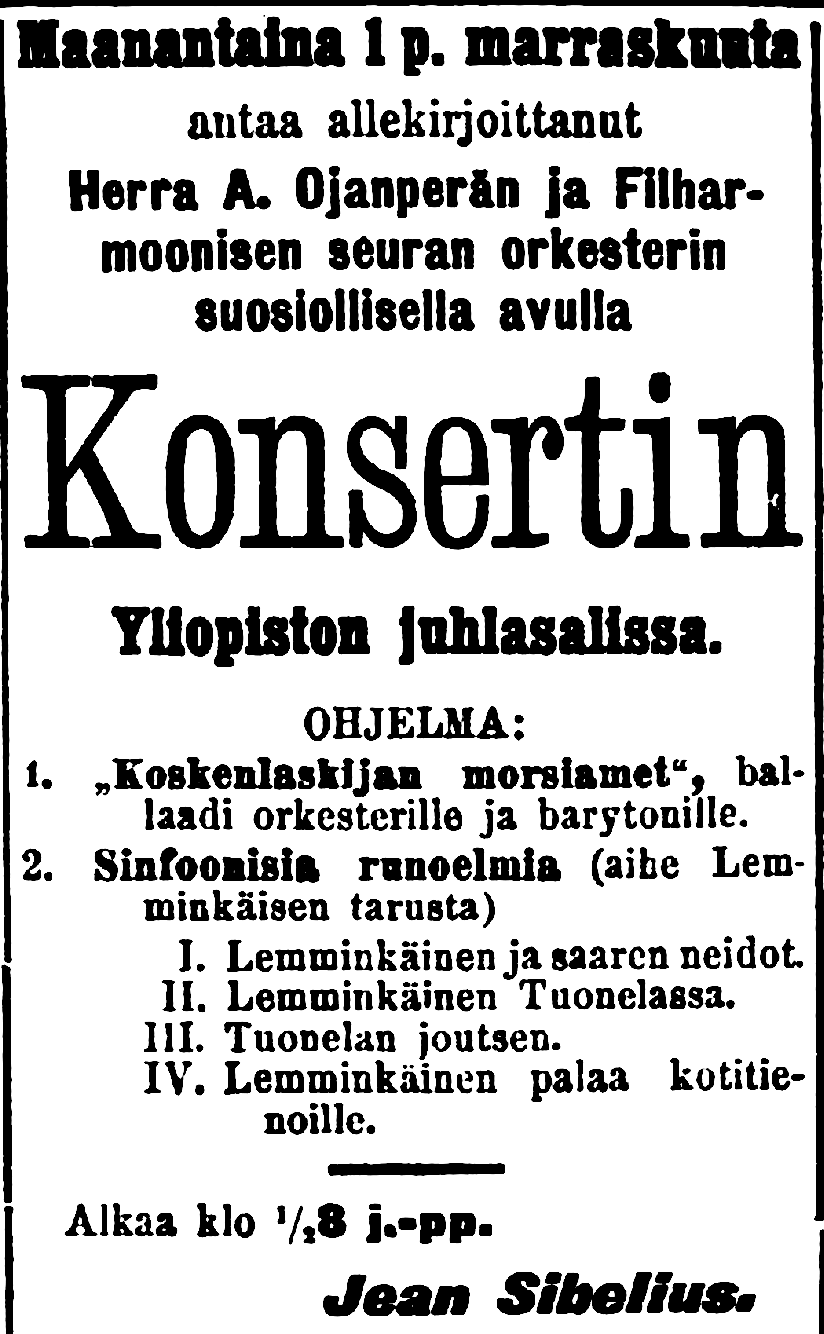
A newspaper advertisement (in Finnish) from Uusi Suometar for the premiere of The Rapids-Rider's Brides

The Rapids-Rider's Brides is scored for the following instruments and voices, organized by family (vocalists, woodwinds, brass, percussion, and strings):

- Baritone (or mezzo-soprano)
- 2 flutes, 2 oboes, 2 clarinets (in A), and 2 bassoons
- 4 horns (in F), 2 trumpets (in F), and 3 trombones
- Timpani, bass drum, cymbals, and triangle
- Violins (I and II), violas, cellos, and double basses

== Discography ==
The Finnish conductor Jorma Panula and the Gothenburg Symphony Orchestra, joined by the Finnish baritone Jorma Hynninen, made the world premiere studio recording of The Rapids-Rider's Brides in May 1984 for BIS. The table below lists this and other commercially available recordings:

No.	Conductor	Orchestra	Baritone	Rec. (Note: Refers to the year in which the performers recorded the work; this may not be the same as the year in which the recording was first released to the general public.)	Time (Note: All runtimes are official, as printed on CD or LP liner notes.)	Venue	Label	Ref.
1	Jorma Panula	Gothenburg Symphony Orchestra	Jorma Hynninen (1)	1984	9:00	Gothenburg Concert Hall	BIS	(Note: J. Panula—BIS (CD–270) 1985)
2	Leif Segerstam	Tampere Philharmonic Orchestra	Jorma Hynninen (2)	?	9:06	?	Ondine	(Note: L. Segerstam—Ondine (ODE 823–2) 2007)
3	Edward Gardner	Bergen Philharmonic Orchestra	Gerald Finley	2016	9:44	Grieg Hall	Chandos	(Note: E. Gardner—Chandos (CHSA 5178) 2017)

No.	Conductor	Orchestra	Ensemble	Rec.	Time	Venue	Label	Ref.
1	Osmo Vänskä	Lahti Symphony Orchestra	YL Male Voice Choir	2005	8:36	Sibelius Hall	BIS	(Note: O. Vänskä—BIS (CD–1525) 2007)

In 2008, the Swedish baritone Gabriel Suovanen and the Finnish pianist Folke Gräsbeck made the world premiere studio (and, to date, only) recording of Sibelius transcription of The Rapids-Rider's Brides for BIS. The table below contains additional details about this recording:

No.	Baritone	Piano	Rec.	Time	Venue	Label	Ref.
1	Gabriel Suovanen	Folke Gräsbeck	2008	11:31	Kuusankoski Concert Hall	BIS	(Note: G. Suovanen—BIS (CD–1918/20) 2008)

== Notes, references, and sources ==
Notes

Sources

- Barnett, Andrew (2007). Sibelius. New Haven: Yale University Press. ISBN 978-0-300-11159-0.
- Dahlström, Fabian [in Swedish] (2003). Jean Sibelius: Thematisch-bibliographisches Verzeichnis seiner Werke [Jean Sibelius: A Thematic Bibliographic Index of His Works] (in German). Wiesbaden: Breitkopf & Härtel. ISBN 3-7651-0333-0.
