= Anton Fils =

German composer

Anton Fils (also Antonín Fils, Johann Anton Fils, Johann Anton Filtz), 22 September 1733 (baptized) – 14 March 1760 (buried) was a German classical composer.

Fils was born in Eichstätt, in the Bishopric of Eichstätt, Bavaria. Long thought to have been of Bohemian origin (e.g., Racek 1956), despite having been described as "from Bavaria" by Friedrich Wilhelm Marpurg in 1756, his true origins were discovered in the 1960s (Wolf 2001). Fils studied law and theology at the University of Ingolstadt, and in 1754 became part of the "Mannheimer Hofkapelle" as a cellist. The Mannheim orchestra at the time was led by Johann Stamitz (Würtz & Wolf 2001). In 1757 Fils married Elizabeth Range, and in 1759 the couple bought a house.

Although he died at age 26, he left an extensive body of work, including at least thirty-four symphonies. Although he composed about thirty concertos, mainly for cello and for flute, only about half have survived (Wolf 2001).

Fils died in Mannheim and was buried on 14 March 1760 (Wolf 2001).

In his book Ideas for an Aesthetic of Music (posthumously published in 1806), author-musician Christian Friedrich Daniel Schubart called Fils "the greatest composer of symphonies who ever lived" (Schubart 1806, 141). He also attributed Fils' early death to "his bizarre notion of eating spiders" (Schubart 1806, 141). Retellings of this legend were elaborated to include Fils assuring horrified observers that spiders tasted like fresh strawberries (Anon. n.d.). The tale still circulates as a curious bit of classical music trivia (Moore 2010,).
