= Daniel Godfrey =

Daniel Godfrey may refer to:

- Daniel Godfrey (bandmaster) (1831–1903), British bandmaster, composer, and arranger
- Daniel Eyers Godfrey (1868–1939), British music conductor and member of a musical dynasty
- Daniel Strong Godfrey (born 1949), American composer
