= Percy Whitlock =

English organist (1903–1946)

- Also known as: Kenneth Lark
- Born: 1 June 1903; Chatham, Kent, England
- Died: 1 May 1946 (aged 42) Bournemouth, England
- Genres: Post-romantic, classical
- Occupation: Composer
- Instrument: Organ
- Years active: 1921–1946

Percy William Whitlock (1 June 1903 in Chatham, Kent – 1 May 1946 in Bournemouth), was an English organist and post-romantic composer.

== Life ==
Percy Whitlock studied at London's Royal College of Music with Charles Villiers Stanford and Ralph Vaughan Williams, and organ with Henry Ley. From 1921 to 1930, Whitlock was assistant organist at Rochester Cathedral in Kent. He served as Director of Music at St Stephen's Church, Bournemouth for the next five years, combining this from 1932 with the role of that town's borough organist, in which capacity he regularly played at the local Pavilion Theatre. After 1935 he worked for the Pavilion Theatre full-time. A tireless railway enthusiast, he wrote at length and with skill about his interest. Sometimes, for both prose and music, he used the pseudonym "Kenneth Lark." He worked closely with the Bournemouth Municipal Orchestra; the orchestra's conductor from 1935 to 1940 was Richard Austin, whose father Frederic Austin dedicated his Organ Sonata to Whitlock.

Whitlock was diagnosed with tuberculosis in 1928. Near the end of his life, he lost his sight altogether, and he died in Bournemouth at age 42. For decades afterwards he remained largely forgotten. This neglect has eased in recent times, in particular through the activities and publications of the Percy Whitlock Trust, founded in 1983. The Percy Whitlock Trust was wound up in 2017, due to the expiry of copyright on Whitlock's compositions, and its assets and archive transferred to the Royal College of Organists.

== Music ==
Whitlock mostly composed light music and church music for organ and choir. An early success was The Island (1919) for chorus and orchestra, performed in Rochester in 1921.

For organ the Five Short Pieces for Organ (1929 - especially the second movement 'Folk Tune') and the five movement Plymouth Suite (1937) have retained their popularity. The Organ Sonata in C minor of 1936 is his most substantial for the instrument, and the Carillion for organ and orchestra (1932) one of the most spectacular. Other orchestral works include the concert overture The Feast of St Benedict (1934) and the four movement Symphony in G minor for organ and orchestra (1936–7), effectively an organ concerto. His church music includes a Communion Service in G and the two motets Glorious in heaven (1925) and Jesu, grant me this I pray (1928, revised 1945).

Recordings include the complete organ works on Priory Records, and there are many other recordings of his organ music. John Scott recorded the Organ Sonata at the organ of St. Paul’s Cathedral in 2004. After decades of complete neglect, in 1989 the Organ Symphony was revived in a BBC broadcast by Graham Barber and the BBC Welsh Symphony Orchestra from Llandaff Cathedral. The first commercial recording was released in 2000, performed the previous year at York Minster with the University of York Symphony Orchestra conducted by Jonathon Wright, and Francis Jackson at the organ. In 2001 Marco Polo issued a recording of the orchestral light music including The Holiday Suite, Music for Orchestra, Wessex Suite and The Feast of St. Benedict.

== Selected works ==
=== Organ solo ===
- Six Hymn Preludes (1923, revised 1944)
- Five Short Pieces (1929)
- Two Fantasie Chorals (1931, revised 1933)
- Four Extemporisations (1932–33)
- Seven Sketches on Verses from the Psalms (1934)
- Sonata in C minor (1935–36)
- Fantasie Choral No. 1 in D flat major (1936)
- Plymouth Suite (1937)
- Reflections: Three Quiet Pieces (1942–45)

=== Orchestra ===
- Carillon (1932)
- March: Dignity and Impudence (1932–33)
- Concert-Overture: The Feast of St. Benedict (1934)
- To Phoebe (1936)
- Symphony in G minor for organ and orchestra (1936–37)
- Poem (1937)
- Wessex Suite (1937)
- Balloon Ballet (1938)
- Holiday Suite (1938–39)
- Ballet of the Wood Creatures (1939)
- Prelude, Air and Fugue (1939)
- Peter's Tune (1939)
- Fanfare on the tune "Song of Agincourt" (1940)
- Caprice (1941)

=== Choral ===
- O Gladsome Light (1917–18)
- Motet: The Saint whose praise today we sing (1923)
- Magnificat and Nunc Dimittis in G (1924)
- Jesu, grant me this, I pray (1924–28, revised 1945)
- Glorious In Heaven (1925)
- Communion Service in G (1927)
- Sing praise to God who reigns above (1928)
- Three Introits (1929)
- Magnificat and Nunc Dimittis in D (1930)
- Evening Cantata: Round me falls the night (1930)
- Magnificat and Nunc Dimittis (Plainsong, with alternate verses in Harmony) (1930)
- A Simple Communion Service (1930)
- Solemn Te Deum (1931)
- He is risen - Anthem for Eastertide (1932)
- Come, let us join our cheerful songs (1945)

== Selected discography ==
- Organ Sonata in C minor, Fantasie Choral No. 1, Five Short Pieces. John Scott/Organ of St. Paul's Cathedral, London. London: Hyperion Records, 2004.
- Organ Sonata in C minor, Five Short Pieces, Reflections, March 'Rustic Cavalry'. Robert Gower/Organ of Selby Abbey: ASV, 1996.
- Holiday Suite, Music for Orchestra, Wessex Suite, The Feast of St. Benedict. Malcolm Riley (Organ), Gavin Sutherland/RTE Concert Orchestra. Hong Kong: Naxos, 2001.
- Symphony in G minor for Organ and Orchestra (1936–37). Francis Jackson: Concerto for Organ, Strings, Timpani and Celeste Op. 64. Francis Jackson, Organist (Whitlock Symphony: York Minster; Jackson Concerto: Lyons Concert Hall, University of York). Jonathan Wainwright/University of York Orchestra. North Yorkshire: Amphion, 2000.
- Complete Organ Works, Vol. 1. Graham Barber/Organ of Hull City Hall. Bedfordshire: Priory Records, 1996.
- Complete Organ Works, Vol. 2. Graham Barber/Organ of Hereford Cathedral. Bedfordshire: Priory Records, 1997.
- Complete Organ Works, Vol. 3. Graham Barber/Compton Organ of Downside Abbey. Bedfordshire: Priory Records, 1998.
- Organ Music. Jennifer Bate (Organist), ASV, 1999.
- The Choral Music of Percy Whitlock. Choir of Rochester Cathedral, Roger Sayer (Director of Music), William Whitehead (Assistant Organist). Bedfordshire: Priory Records, 1996.
- Whitlock & Bax Choral Music. The Ramsey Singers, Mark Fenton (Director), Jeremy Filsell (Organist), ASV, 1991.
- In London Town. Organ Sonata, Fantasie Choral No 1. Benjamin Sheen (organ). CRD RECORDS 3541 (2022).

== Bibliography ==
- Riley, Malcolm (2007): The Percy Whitlock Companion. Kent: The Percy Whitlock Trust.
- Riley, Malcolm (2003): Percy Whitlock: organist and composer (2d ed.). York: Ebor Press.
