= Montague Birch =

British musical conductor

Charles Montague Birch (1884–1947) was a British musical conductor. He was born in Leamington Spa, the eldest child of Charles Septimus Birch and Clara Birch. 'Monty' had joined the 2nd violins of the Bournemouth Municipal Orchestra (today the Bournemouth Symphony Orchestra) in 1912 becoming assistant conductor to Dan Godfrey. In 1934 Birch auditioned unsuccessfully for the post of musical director. When in 1940 Bournemouth Corporation reduced the size of the orchestra to 24 players, the conductor Richard Austin resigned and Birch took over, steering the orchestra through the war years. He was chief conductor of the orchestra from 1940 until 1946, putting himself forward to be principal conductor, but died on 20 February 1947 before the auditions were held; he was succeeded by Rudolf Schwarz. Birch's funeral took place in St Ambrose's Church, Bournemouth, on 24 February. During the Second World War he became conductor of the Bournemouth Home Guard Band, for whom he composed a Home Guard march, "the Carabiniers". His other compositions include the Intermezzo Pizzicati for strings of 1913 and the Dance of the Nymphs (1923), both of which he recorded with the Bournemouth Orchestra for Columbia on 78 rpm discs, a Processional March for organ (published in 1907) and a solo song, The Farmer's Lad (1911) - a setting of his own lyric. Birch also supplied the music for Cyril Delevanti's revue, 'Bournemyth' which was produced in the (old) Winter Gardens in Bournemouth in June 1916.
