= List of compositions by Thomas de Hartmann =

This is a list of composition by Thomas de Hartmann (1884–1956).

== Orchestral ==
- Suite from “La Fleurette rouge”. (1911)
- Scherzo fantastique. Op. 25. (1929)
- Two Organ Fugues of Bach transcribed for Orchestra. Op. 48. (1934)
- First Symphonie-Poème. Op. 50. (1934)
- Concerto for Violoncello and Orchestra. Op. 57. (c. 1936, published 1938)
- Twelve Russian Fairy Tales. Op. 58. (1937)
- Koliadky. Noëls Ukrainiens, chant spiritual. Op. 60. (c. 1938)
- Concerto for Piano and Orchestra. Op. 61. (1939)
- Suite pour grand orchestre: Une Fête en Ukraine. Op. 62. (1941)
- Fantasie-concerto for Contrabass and Orchestra. Op. 65. (1944)
- Concerto for Violin and Orchestra. Op. 66. (1944)
- Second Symphonie-Poème – Le dit du soleil. Op. 68. (1950)
- “La Guzla” – Concerto for Harp and Orchestra. Rapsodie slave d’après P. Merimé. Op. 72. (1945)
- Concerto d’après un cantate de Bach. For Violoncello and String Orchestra. Op. 73. (1949)
- Dances from the opera Esther. Op. 76. (1949)
- Concierto Andaluz, for Flute and Orchestra. Op. 81. (1949)
- Third Symphonie-Poème. Op. 85. (1953)
- Fourth Symphonie-Poème. Unfinished. Op. 90. (1956)

== Chamber and instrumental music ==
- Sonate pour violon et piano. Op. 51. (1935)
- Concerto for Violoncello and Orchestra. Arrangement for Violoncello and Piano. Op. 57. (1936)
- Koliadky. Noëls Ukrainiens, chant spiritual. Arrangement for Saxophone Quartet. Op. 60. (c. 1938)
- Concerto for Piano and Orchestra. Arrangement for Two Pianos. Op. 61. (1939)
- Sonate pour violoncelle et piano. Op. 63. (1941)
- Deux Pleureuses. Violin and Piano. Op. 64 (c. 1942)
- Fantasie-concerto for Contrabass and Orchestra. Arrangement for Contrabass and Piano. Op. 65. (1944)
- Concerto for Violin and Orchestra. Arrangement for Violin and Piano. Op. 66. (1944)
- La Guzla: Concerto for Harp and Orchestra. Rapsodie slave d’après P. Merimé. Arrangement for Harp and Piano. Op. 72. (1945)
- Concerto d’après un cantate de Bach. Arrangement for Violoncello and Piano. Op. 73. (1945)
- Trio pour flute, violon et piano – “Quasi variations.” Op. 75. (1946)
- Two Preludes of J.S. Bach. Cello and piano. (1947)
- Dances from the opera Esther. Arrangement for Violin and Piano. Op. 76. (1949)
- Concierto Andaluz, for Flute and Orchestra. Arrangement for Flute and Piano. Op. 81. (1949)
- La Kobsa: deux musiques de veilleurs ukrainiens pour violoncelle solo. (1950)

== Music for stage works ==
- Incidental music for the play “Caligula,” by Alexander Dumas. For Orchestra. (1903)
- La Fleurette rouge, ballet en cinq actes. Op. 9. (1906)
- Les Bacchantes, Choreographic Suite for “Danses Plastique” performed by Sacharoff. (1910)
- Fra Mino. Choreographic poem. Op. 14. (1912)
- Gelbe Klang [Yellow Sound], with Wassily Kandinsky. Unfinished. (1912)
- Forces de l’amour et de la sorcellerie, divertissement comique en trois interludes. Op. 16. (1916)
- Flenushka. Unfinished opera. (1916)
- Music for the drama “In the Grip of Life,” by Knut Hamson. Tiflis Art Theater. Op. 22. (1919)
- Music for “The King of the Dark Chamber,” by Rabindranath Tagore. Tiflis. Op. 23. (1919)
- Le General Boulanger, d’après Maurice Rostand. Unfinished. (c. 1931)
- Babette, comédie-ballet en deux actes par Henri Cain. Op. 49 (1935)
- Suite pour grand orchestre: Une Fête en Ukraine, ballet en un acte. Op. 62. (1941)
- Esther, tragédie musicale d’après Racine. Opera. Op. 76. (1949)
- Musique pour la fête de la Patronne, d’après Degas. Ballet. Op. 77. (1949)

== Piano solo ==
- Sonata for Piano. Op. 2. (1902)
- Trois Morceaux. Op. 4. (c. 1903)
- Six Pieces. Op. 7. (c. 1903)
- Three Preludes. Op. 9. (1904)
- La Fleurette rouge. Reduction for Piano Solo. Op. 9. (1906)
- Suite from “La Fleurette rouge”. Arranged for Piano Solo. (1911)
- Fra Mino. Selections. Reduction for Piano Solo. Op. 14. (1912)
- Forces de l’amour et de la sorcellerie. Reduction for Piano Solo. Op. 16. (1917)
- Humoresque Viennoise. Op. 45. (1931)
- Babette, comédie-ballet en deux actes par Henri Cain. Arranged for Piano Solo. Op. 49 (1935)
- Twelve Russian Fairy Tales. Version for Piano Solo. Op. 58. (1937)
- Koliadky. Version for Piano Solo. Op. 60. (c. 1940)
- First Piano Sonata. Op. 67. (1942)
- Lumière noire. Op. 74. (1948)
- Musique pour la fête de la Patronne, d’après Degas. Reduction for Piano Solo. Op. 77. (1949)
- Second Piano Sonata. Op. 82. (1951)
- Six Preludes. Op. 83. (1952)
- Two Nocturnes. Op. 84. (1954)
- Four Serenades. Op. 86. (1954)
- Three Songs. Under pseudonym of Thomas Kross. (c. 1955)
- Poco Rubato. Piano solo. n.d.

== Vocal ==
- Romance. Words by Tatiana Shchepkina-Kupernik. Voice and Piano. (1901)
- Three Romances. Words by Pyotr Kapnist and Mikhail Golenischev-Kutusov. Op. 5. Voice and Piano. (c. 1903)
- Mermaids. Words by B. Kakhovsky. Op. 5. Voice and Piano. (c. 1903)
- Four Poems of K. Balmont. Op. 8. Voice and Piano. (c. 1904)
- John of Damascus, cantata for soloists, mixed choir and symphony orchestra. Text based on the poem by A. K. Tolstoy. Op. 1. (1906)
- From the Verses of D.M. Ausonius. Op. 13. Voice and Orchestra. Also arranged for Voice and Piano. (1911)
- Three Songs of Balmont. Op. 12. Voice and Piano. (1912)
- Three Moorish Songs. Translated by Konstantin Balmont. Op. 15. Voice and Piano. (1913)
- Four Melodies. Words by Anna Achmatova. Op. 17. Voice and Piano. (1915). Reproduced manuscript in Montreal collection
- Christ is Risen. Words by Sergei Gorodetsky. Op. 18. Voice and Piano. (1915)
- Two Spanish Songs. Words by Valery Bryusov. Op. 19. Voice and Piano. (1916)
- To the moon. Words by Shelley. Op. 11. Voice and Piano. (1917)
- Nightingale. Voice and Orchestra. (c. 1919)
- Cranes. Words by Vassily Zota. Voice and Piano. (1920)
- Bulgarian Songs. Translated by Konstantin Balmont. Op. 46. Voice and Piano. (1933)
- Three Ballads. Words by G. Adamovich and Maria Tsvetaeva. Op. 47. Voice and Piano. (1934)
- Lament for King Alexander. Voice and Piano. (1934)
- Three Poems of Shelley. Op. 52. Voice and Orchestra. Also arranged for Voice and Piano. (1936)
- Sonnet de Ronsard. Op. 54. Voice and Piano. (1934)
- Romance 1830. Op. 55. Voice and Piano. (1936)
- In Helen’s Herb Garden. Words by Vassilli Travnikov. Voice and Piano. (1936)
- A Poet’s Love: Nine Poems by Pushkin. Op. 59. Voice and Piano. (1936)
- Indian Summer. Words by Don Aminado. Voice and Piano. (1938)
- Sept Paysages Tristes. Words by Paul Verlaine. Op. 69. Voice and Piano. (1943)
- Two Songs. Words by Fyodor Sologub and William Shakespeare. Voice and Piano. (c. 1943)
- Fragment of Proust. Op. 70. Voice and Piano. (1945)
- Six Commentaries from Ulysses by James Joyce. Op. 71. Voice and Piano. (1948)
- Second Fragment of Proust. Op. 79. Voice and Piano. (1948)
- Les Courbes d’Atalante: Déclamation avec musique d’Harpe. Words by Serge Moreux. (1949)
- La Tramuntana. Words by J. Gual. Op. 80. For a cappella choir. (1949)
- A la St. Jean d’été. Words by Serge Moreux and Thomas Kross (pseud.). Voice and Piano. (1949)
- Frenchman in Arizona. Words and Music by Thomas Kross (pseud.). Voice and Piano. (1951)
- The Song of the Dead Venetian. Words by Jean Loynel; Music: Thomas Kross (pseud.). Voice and Piano. (c. 1951)
- The Barrel Organ Girl. Words by Maria Tsvetaeva. Voice and Piano. (c. 1954)
- Pour chanter a la Route d'Assise. Words by Serge Moreux. Voice and piano. (c. 1955)
- Four popular Russian songs. Men’s a cappella quartet. (n.d.)
- In the Nocturnal Silence. Men’s a cappella quartet. (n.d.)
- Twilight. Words by Luc Durtin. Voice and Piano. (n.d.)
- Two Chinese Songs. Translated by George Soulié de Morant. Voice and Piano. (n.d.)
- White flocks. Words by Anna Achmatova. Voice and Piano. (n.d.)

== Collaborations with G.I. Gurdjieff ==
The following volumes are all published by Schott Music Group:

- Gurdjieff/de Hartmann: Music for the Piano.
  - Volume I: Asian Songs and Rhythms
  - Volume II: Music of the Sayyids and the Dervishes
  - Volume III: Hymns, Prayers and Rituals
  - Volume IV: Hymns from a Great Temple and Other Selected Works

== Sources ==
- Thomas de Hartmann papers, MSS 46, Irving S. Gilmore Music Library, Yale University.
- Thomas de Hartmann collection, private collection in Montreal, Quebec, Canada.
- Russian National Archive of Literature and Art, Moscow, Russia.
- Bibliothèque Nationale de France catalogue
- Schott Music Group
