= Charles Godfrey (bandmaster) =

English bandmaster, drummer, and bassoonist

Charles Godfrey (November 22, 1790, Kingston-upon-Thames – December 12, 1863, London) was an English bandmaster, drummer and bassoonist, and the founder member of an extensive musical family.

He began his career as a drummer in the band of the 1st Royal Surrey Militia. From 1813 he played in the band of the Coldstream Guards as a bassoonist. He was appointed director of this band in 1825. He served in that position until 1834 when he was discharged from military duty, but continued to direct the group as a civilian musician. In 1831 Godfrey was appointed musician-in-ordinary to King William IV. He was editor of the first English publication devoted to military music, Jullien’s Military Journal.

His son Fred Godfrey succeeded him as director of the Coldstream Guards band in 1863. His other son was the bandmaster Dan Godfrey who was the father of the bandmaster and Bournemouth conductor Daniel Eyers Godfrey.

== Musical family ==
- Charles Godfrey (1790–1863)
  - Daniel Godfrey (1831–1903), bandmaster, Grenadier Guards
    - Daniel Eyers Godfrey (1868–1939), conductor, founder of the Bournemouth Municipal Orchestra
      - Dan Godfrey III (1893–1935), BBC Manchester (1920s), first full-time conductor of the BBC Wireless Orchestra
  - Fred Godfrey (1837–1882), bandmaster, Coldstream Guards
  - Charles Godfrey II. (1839–1919), bandmaster, Royal Horse Guards
    - Charles George Godfrey (1866–1935), composer, bandmaster, musical director of spa resorts, Buxton, Scarborough
    - Arthur Eugene Godfrey (1868–1939), organist, composer, musical director of the Shaftesbury Theatre
    - Herbert A Godfrey (1870–1952), bandmaster, Christ's Hospital, Crystal Palace Military Band
    - Winnie Godfrey, pianist, studied Royal College of Music, 1890s
    - Rosie Godfrey, singer, pianist, studied Royal College of Music, 1890s
