= Mark Wigglesworth =

British conductor

- Born: 19 July 1964 (age 62); Sussex, England, UK
- Occupation: Conductor

Mark Wigglesworth (born 19 July 1964) is a British conductor.

== Biography ==
Born in Sussex, Wigglesworth attended Bryanston School, Manchester University, and the Royal Academy of Music in London. He won the Kondrashin Conducting Competition in Amsterdam in 1989. John Drummond appointed him associate conductor of the BBC Symphony Orchestra in 1991, a post he held until 1993. Wigglesworth was principal conductor of the BBC National Orchestra of Wales from 1996 until 2000. He was the principal guest conductor of the Swedish Radio Symphony Orchestra from 1998 to 2001.

Wigglesworth led his first opera production in 1991, conducting Cosi fan Tutte for Opera Factory in London. He made his first conducting appearance with the Royal Opera House, Covent Garden in November 2002. He has also conducted at the Welsh National Opera, the Metropolitan Opera, English National Opera, and Glyndebourne. In 2005, he made his Metropolitan Opera debut conducting Le Nozze di Figaro. In April 2006, Wigglesworth was named the next music director of the La Monnaie opera, Brussels, succeeding Kazushi Ono. After a season of working together with the company's then-music director, Kazushi Ono (2007–2008), Wigglesworth had originally been scheduled to assume sole control as music director with the 2008–2009 season. In April 2008, La Monnaie announced that Wigglesworth would not take up the post of music director at La Monnaie.

In January 2014, English National Opera (ENO) named Wigglesworth its next music director, succeeding Edward Gardner effective September 2015. Shortly into his tenure, Wigglesworth expressed disapproval of proposals by ENO management for economising measures, such as a reduction in the contract of the ENO chorus. On 22 March 2016, he resigned from the music directorship of ENO, effective at the close of the 2015–2016 season. The resignation report indicated that he was to honour existing conducting commitments with the company. In a separate letter to ENO musicians, Wigglesworth said:

"The company is evolving now into something I do not recognise, and as hard as I have tried to argue to maintain what I believe to be the fundamental pillars of our identity, I have failed to persuade others of this necessity.”

In 2018, the Adelaide Symphony Orchestra appointed Wigglesworth as its principal guest conductor. In November 2021, the Bournemouth Symphony Orchestra announced the appointment of Wigglesworth as its next principal guest conductor, with immediate effect. In March 2024, the Bournemouth Symphony Orchestra announced the appointment of Wigglesworth as its next chief conductor, effective with the 2024–2025 season, with an initial contract of four years. In May 2024, the Adelaide Symphony Orchestra announced the appointment of Wigglesworth as its next chief conductor, effective January 2025, with an initial contract of three years.

Wigglesworth has recorded commercially for such labels as BIS. In 2018, Faber & Faber published Wigglesworth's book The Silent Musician: Why Conducting Matters.

Wigglesworth is married to the University College London archaeologist Annemieke Milks. The couple have a daughter and live in Sussex. He is not related to the conductor Ryan Wigglesworth.

Cultural offices
Preceded by Tadaaki Otaka	Music Director, BBC National Orchestra of Wales; 1996–2000	Succeeded by Richard Hickox
Preceded by Edward Gardner	Music Director, English National Opera; 2015–2016	Succeeded by Martyn Brabbins
Preceded by Kirill Karabits	Chief Conductor, Bournemouth Symphony Orchestra; 2024–present	Succeeded by incumbent
Preceded by Nicholas Carter	Chief Conductor, Adelaide Symphony Orchestra; 2025–present	Succeeded by incumbent
