= Kirill Karabits =

Ukrainian conductor

Kyrylo Karabyts
- Кирило Карабиць
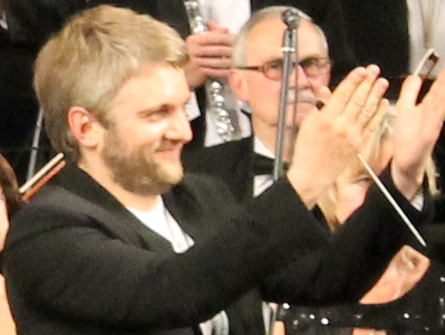
- Karabyts conducting an opera in Lviv, 2015
- Born: 26 December 1976 (age 49); Kyiv, Ukrainian SSR, Soviet Union
- Occupation: Conductor
- Years active: 1995–present
- Father: Ivan Karabyts

Kirill Karabits OBE (Ukrainian: Кири́ло Іва́нович Кара́биць, romanized: Kyrylo Ivanovych Karabyts; born 26 December 1976) is a Ukrainian conductor.

== Biography ==
=== Early life ===
The son of the conductor and composer Ivan Karabyts, Karabits was born on 26 December 1976 in Kyiv (then in the Ukrainian SSR of the Soviet Union). In his youth, Karabits studied piano, musicology and composition developing an interest in conducting at age 13. His early teachers included Tatiana Kozlova. In Kyiv, he studied at the Lysenko Music School, and later at the National Tchaikovsky Music Academy. In 1995, he began studies at the Vienna Musikhochschule and earned a diploma in orchestral conducting after five years of study. He also attended the Internationale Bachakademie Stuttgart, where he was a pupil of Helmuth Rilling and Peter Gülke. He has done scholarly work on the musical archive of the Berliner Singakademie, such as transcribing the 1784 Johannes Passion of Carl Philipp Emanuel Bach, which was thought to be lost.

=== Career ===
Karabits made his first public conducting appearance aged 19. He was assistant conductor of the Budapest Festival Orchestra from 1998 to 2000. He also served as associate conductor of the Orchestre Philharmonique de Radio France from 2002 to 2005. From 2005 to 2007, Karabits was principal guest conductor of the Orchestre Philharmonique de Strasbourg.

==== Bournemouth Symphony Orchestra ====
In October 2006, Karabits made his first conducting appearance with the Bournemouth Symphony Orchestra (BSO), and returned in October 2007, where both concerts received acclaim. In November 2007, the BSO announced the appointment of Karabits as their 13th Principal Conductor, after a unanimous vote from the orchestra musicians, effective with the 2009–2010 season. The BSO appointment marked Karabits' first chief conductorship. Karabits held the title of Principal Conductor-Designate for the 2008–2009 season, with three concerts. He made his first conducting appearance at The Proms with the BSO in August 2009, and formally took up the principal conductor post in October 2009. He was the first Ukrainian conductor to be named principal conductor of a UK orchestra. In August 2011, Karabits and the BSO agreed on a three-year extension of his contract through the 2015–2016 season. In 2015, Karabits signed a rolling contract as principal conductor.

Karabits conducted several premieres with the Bournemouth orchestra, including the UK premiere of Magnus Lindberg's Absence, 'Unforged' by Carmen Ho (November 2021), Nurymov Symphony No. 2 (19 January 2022), Ali-Zadeh Nizami Cosmology (April 2022), Akimenko's Cello Concerto (October 2022) and Anna Korsun's Terricone (January 2023). Karabits concluded his tenure as the orchestra's chief conductor at the close of the 2023–2024 season, and now has the title of conductor laureate with the orchestra, and serves as artistic director of its Voices from the East project.

=== Other conducting work ===
Karabits made his North American conducting debut with the Houston Symphony Orchestra in March 2009. Karabits first conducted the 'I, CULTURE Orchestra' of Poland in 2013 and became its artistic director in 2014. In November 2014, he made his first guest-conducting appearances with the Staatskapelle Weimar. He first conducted a production at the Deutsches Nationaltheater and Staatskapelle Weimar in March 2015. Based on these appearances, in July 2015, the Deutsches Nationaltheater and Staatskapelle Weimar named Karabits their next Generalmusikdirektor (GMD) and chief conductor, effective with the 2016–2017 season, with an initial contract of 3 years. In June 2018, the DNT and Staatskapelle Weimar announced the scheduled conclusion of Karabits' tenure as GMD of the company in the summer of 2019, following an inability to reach terms on extending his tenure.

In the opera house, Karabits conducted the premiere in Paris of Les orages désirés by Gérard Condé in 2003. He made his debut at English National Opera in 2010 in Don Giovanni. His Deutsche Oper Berlin guest-conducting debut was with Boris Godunov in 2017.

=== Competition juries ===
Karabits has served on the juries of several international music competitions. In 2023, he chaired the jury of the Horowitz Competition Kyiv–Geneva, whose other jury members included Giuseppe Albanese, Michel Béroff, Alexej Gorlatch, Rico Gulda, Tisa Ho, Piers Lane, Maria Murawska and Sisi Ye.

He was also listed among the jury members for the second edition of the International Conducting Competition Rotterdam, alongside conductors and musicians including Jonathan Nott, Vasily Petrenko, Sarah Hicks, Evelino Pidò, Otto Tausk, Roberta Alexander, Han-Na Chang, Brett Dean, Sian Edwards, Iván Fischer, Dame Jane Glover, Vimbayi Kaziboni, Andrés Orozco-Estrada, Kwamé Ryan and Yip Wing-sie, among others. In 2025, he served on the jury of the International Ferenc Fricsay Conducting Competition in Szeged with Heiko Mathias Förster, Sándor Gyüdi, Lucius Hemmer, Alevtina Ioffe, Konstantin Orbelian, Adam Stadnicki and Nayden Todorov.

Karabits was announced as a member of the jury for the 18th Donatella Flick LSO Conducting Competition, chaired by Antonio Pappano and including James MacMillan, Sian Edwards, Sarah Quinn and Rachel Gough. He was also a member of the jury of the inaugural Royal Academy of Music Bicentenary Prize, together with Adrian Brendel and Felicity Lott.

=== Recordings ===
With the Staatskapelle Weimar he has recorded Strauss and Liszt. With the BSO, Karabits has recorded music of Rodion Shchedrin for the Naxos label, and music of Aram Khachaturian for the Onyx Classics label. He recorded a complete cycle of the seven Prokofiev symphonies with the BSO on Onyx from 2013 to 2015, which included the symphonic fragment of 1902, the original version of the fourth, and the alternative ending for the seventh. A series of CDs with music by composers from Armenia, Azerbaijan, Turkmenistan and Ukraine, such as Kara Karayev, Boris Lyatoshynsky, Chary Nurymov and Avet Terterian has appeared on the Chandos label. His performance of Sardanapalo by Liszt in Weimar was later issued on CD by Audite.

Karabits conducted the world premiere recording released by Pentatone of Esther by de Hartmann with The Grange Festival Chorus, Bournemouth Symphony Orchestra and Corinne Winters in the title role.

Cultural offices
Preceded by Marin Alsop	Principal Conductor, Bournemouth Symphony Orchestra; 2009–2024	Succeeded by Mark Wigglesworth
Preceded by Stefan Solyom	Generalmusikdirektor, Deutsches Nationaltheater and Staatskapelle Weimar; 2016–2019	Succeeded by Dominik Beykirch (chief conductor)
