= Rudolf Schwarz (conductor) =

Austrian-born conductor of Jewish ancestry

Rudolf Schwarz

Rudolf Schwarz CBE (29 April 1905 – 30 January 1994) was an Austrian-born conductor. He became a British citizen and spent the latter half of his life in England.

== Biography ==
=== Early life ===
Schwarz was born in a Jewish family in Vienna and at the age of six began piano lessons followed shortly by the violin. His father was opposed to his son's ambition to become a conductor. In order to get money for music lessons and gallery tickets at the Opera, he gave lessons himself. He studied with the composers Richard Robert, Hans Gál and Richard Strauss. In 1922, at the age of seventeen, he played viola in the Vienna State Opera orchestra and Vienna Philharmonic, and he made his conducting debut in Düsseldorf as assistant to Georg Szell in 1924. Schwarz also acted as director of the choral society in Rheydt.

=== Conducting in Germany ===
After opera experience in Düsseldorf, Schwarz moved to Karlsruhe in 1927 as first conductor at the State Theatre alongside Josef Krips and Joseph Keilberth. There, he conducted all Wagner operas except Tristan und Isolde, and led symphony concerts. The Civil Service Law of 7 April 1933 led to his dismissal by the Nazis because he was Jewish.

In 1936, he became a director of the Kulturbund Deutscher Juden (JKB) in Berlin, a German-Jewish cultural organisation backed by the Nazi Propaganda Ministry of Joseph Goebbels, which allowed Jewish artists to perform for Jewish audiences. He also conducted in Gothenburg between 1936 and 1938. The Nazis imprisoned him from 1939 to 1940. When the JKB was dissolved in 1941, he was deported to Auschwitz, but Wilhelm Furtwängler's wife Zitla secured his release. He was then sent to Sachsenhausen and ended up in Belsen concentration camp in 1945. While at Auschwitz, he suffered a broken shoulder-blade, which inhibited his gestures as a conductor in later life. The effects of this injury on his conducting style can be seen in a DVD of him conducting the finale of the Brahms Violin Concerto with David Oistrakh in May 1958.

It is not clear why Schwarz did not attempt to leave Germany in 1939. Possible explanations include the security of his employment with JKB and the difficulty of finding work elsewhere.

=== Career in Britain ===
After the end of World War II, Schwarz went to Sweden to recover from typhoid, and there met his future second wife Greta. In 1946 he received an offer to join Berlin Opera as conductor, which he refused.

He was preparing to go to America when in 1947 his brother in London sent him an advertisement for a post in Bournemouth. After the trial concerts, the orchestra voted unanimously for his appointment in 1947 to lead the newly reformed Bournemouth Municipal Orchestra, despite objections from the Musicians' Union which tried to prevent his appointment on the grounds that there were already too many émigré musicians in the country. He was central to rebuilding the Bournemouth Municipal Orchestra, with notable performances of Beethoven's 9th Symphony, Mahler's The Song of the Earth with Kathleen Ferrier and Richard Lewis, and Arnold Bax's 3rd Symphony at the Festival Hall in 1951. The workload was immense, as Schwarz was required to lead 150 concerts in his first season.

Schwarz received praise from Thomas Beecham as an "able conductor" for his work with the Bournemouth orchestra, and subsequently held Principal Conductor positions with the City of Birmingham Symphony Orchestra (1951–1957) and the BBC Symphony Orchestra. With the BBC SO, he was praised for his efforts "to reach the truth of the music". However, in the 1961-1962 season his interpretation of Mahler's Symphony No. 9 was criticised in the press as "blatant misrepresentation", and as moving "from bad to worse". Leonard Isaacs of the BBC Music Division postulated "a concerted and premeditated effort by the gentlemen of the press to belittle [Schwarz] on every possible occasion". In April 1961, William Glock, Controller of Music at the BBC, proposed a new scheme whereby Schwarz was to stand down as chief conductor in August 1962, and to continue subsequently as a guest conductor with the BBC SO. According to Nicholas Kenyon:

"Schwarz was delighted with the scheme – it would enable him to concentrate on the repertoire he loved, and work in the relative calm of the studio more than in the competitive atmosphere of the London concert hall where he had been uneasy ever since moving from the provinces".

In 1964, Schwarz was appointed Artistic Director and Principal Conductor of the Northern Sinfonia, where he served until 1973. Schwarz returned to Bournemouth as a regular guest from 1970 to 1979, and also held guest appointments in Bergen, and with the English Opera Group and National Youth Orchestra. In June 1973 he was appointed a Commander of the Order of the British Empire (CBE).

Rudolf Schwarz died in London in 1994, aged 88.

== Musicianship ==
Schwarz received much praise from Northern Sinfonia musicians who played under him. Violinist Martin Hughes said that his "sense of rhythm, structure and tempo was exceptional", and clarinettist George McDonald reflected that "he made the Sinfonia listen to themselves – blend with each other ... he helped form the Orchestra's style and gave them musical discipline."

Oboist Janet Craxton praised his selflessness, while David Patmore considers that he "may not have been a great conductor, but he certainly was a great musician".

Simon Rattle acknowledged Schwarz as a "formative influence" who taught him "the paramount importance of imposing his pulse on the music he played". According to Rattle, Schwarz never "gave any interpretation that didn’t have a real truth about it".

== Recordings ==
Schwarz's 1958 recording of Mahler's Symphony No. 5 with the London Symphony Orchestra originally for the Everest label has been highly praised. He conducted for many concerto recordings, as well as the Dvořák Slavonic Dances (BBCSO), and Liszt Hungarian Rhapsodies (Philharmonia). He started and ended his recording career with the Bournemouth orchestra: several overtures in the early 1950s and an LP of Schubert overtures in 1980 (all EMI). There are further broadcast recordings by Schwarz in the British Library Sound Archive.

== Bibliography ==
- Griffiths, Bill (2004). Northern Sinfonia: A Magic of Its Own. Newcastle-upon-Tyne, UK: Northumbria University Press. ISBN 1-904794-07-6.
- Patmore, David (Summer 2008). "Rudolf Schwarz – the Musician's Musician". Classical Recordings Quarterly. No. 53. pp. 49–54. (This article draws extensively on doctoral research by Charlotte Exon, University of Birmingham, 2004.)

Cultural offices
Preceded by Montague Birch	Principal Conductor, Bournemouth Symphony Orchestra; 1947–1951	Succeeded by Charles Groves
Preceded by no predecessor	Artistic Director, Music Director and Principal Conductor, Northern Sinfonia; 1964–1973	Succeeded by Christopher Seaman
