= Norman Hallam (composer) =

English clarinetist and composer

Norman Hallam (9 October 1945 – April 2025) was an English clarinetist and the composer of the Dance Suite for wind quintet.

Born in Coventry, Hallam began playing the clarinet from the age of 11, studying with Michael Saxton, then principal clarinet with the BBC Midland Orchestra. He continued his studies at the Birmingham School of Music with Saxton and composition with Allan Hawthorne-Baker (1909-1977). He attended the Royal Academy of Music in London from 1964 until 1968. After two years as a freelancer he joined the Bournemouth Symphony Orchestra in 1970 as 2nd Clarinet under Kevin Banks, staying there until 1999 when he retired for health reasons. Hallam was also a member of the Canzona Wind Quintet from the mid-1970s until the mid-1980s.

His best known composition is the Dance Suite (1980) for wind ensemble (flute, oboe, clarinet, horn and bassoon), which was written for Canzona. It has four movements: Waltz, Bossa Nova, Quickstep and Charleston. Other pieces include a Fantasy for four horns and a Fantasy for unaccompanied clarinet (1992), which has been performed by Michael Whight. His jazz-influenced Clarinet Concerto, premiered in October 1998, was composed for Kevin Banks, who performed it twice (at Cheltenham and Poole). Banks has described the difficulties of the piece as "fiendish".

Hallam contracted polio in 1949 at the age of four, and used a wheelchair all his life. He had a daughter and son from his first marriage. He married his second wife Sally (a viola player) in the early-1980s, and they had a son and daughter.
