= Band of the Grenadier Guards =

British military band

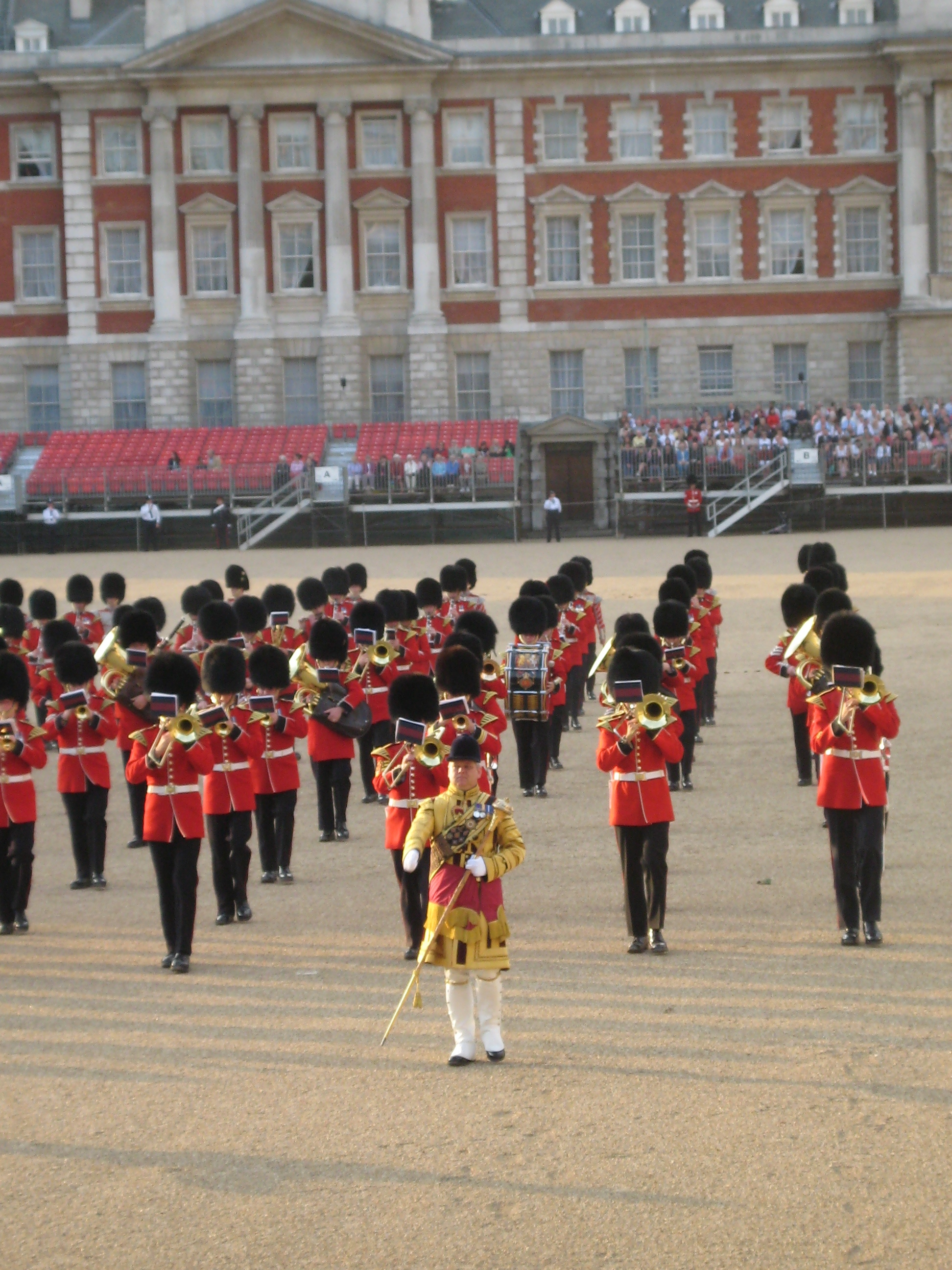
- The band on Horseguards Parade in London in 2008, rehearsing for Trooping the Colour

Background information
- Also known as: Band of the Grenadier Guards
- Origin: London, England, United Kingdom
- Website: Band of the Grenadier Guards

The Band of the Grenadier Guards is the military band of the Grenadier Guards, which is an infantry regiment of the British Army. It was raised between 1660 with first a drum and 1665, when a fife was added.

== History ==
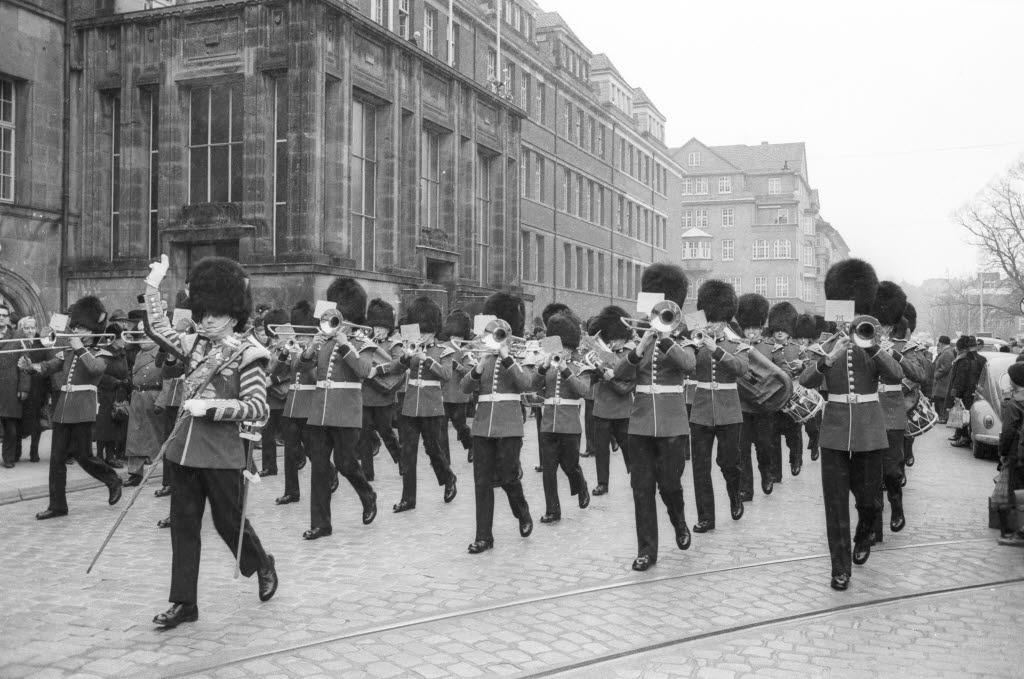
The Band in Kiel in 1967.

The birth of the Grenadiers Band has been described to date from 1665, when each company had one soldier who had been instructed in playing the fife. In 1685, Charles II allowed the band to maintain 12 "hautbois" (oboe) players. His death in 1685 was so significant for the band that until the Second World War, the Bass Drummer (known officially as The Regimental Timebeater), wore a black armband in mourning of the king's death.

The march The British Grenadiers was introduced to British audiences in the late 17th century.

George II gave Handel the task of scoring the Music for the Royal Fireworks, most commonly performed with strings, for the king's own musicians, who were wind players from his foot guards. Handel would have likely come into contact with musicians from the Grenadier Guards during the first performance at Vauxhall Gardens in 1749.

By 1794, instrumentation included a flute player and sixteen others, namely six clarinets, three bassoons, three horns, one trumpet, two serpents and one drums.

From 1856 to 1896 Lt. Daniel Godfrey MVO (1831–1903) was the bandmaster.

In May 2008, the Band was given the freedom of the City of Lincoln.

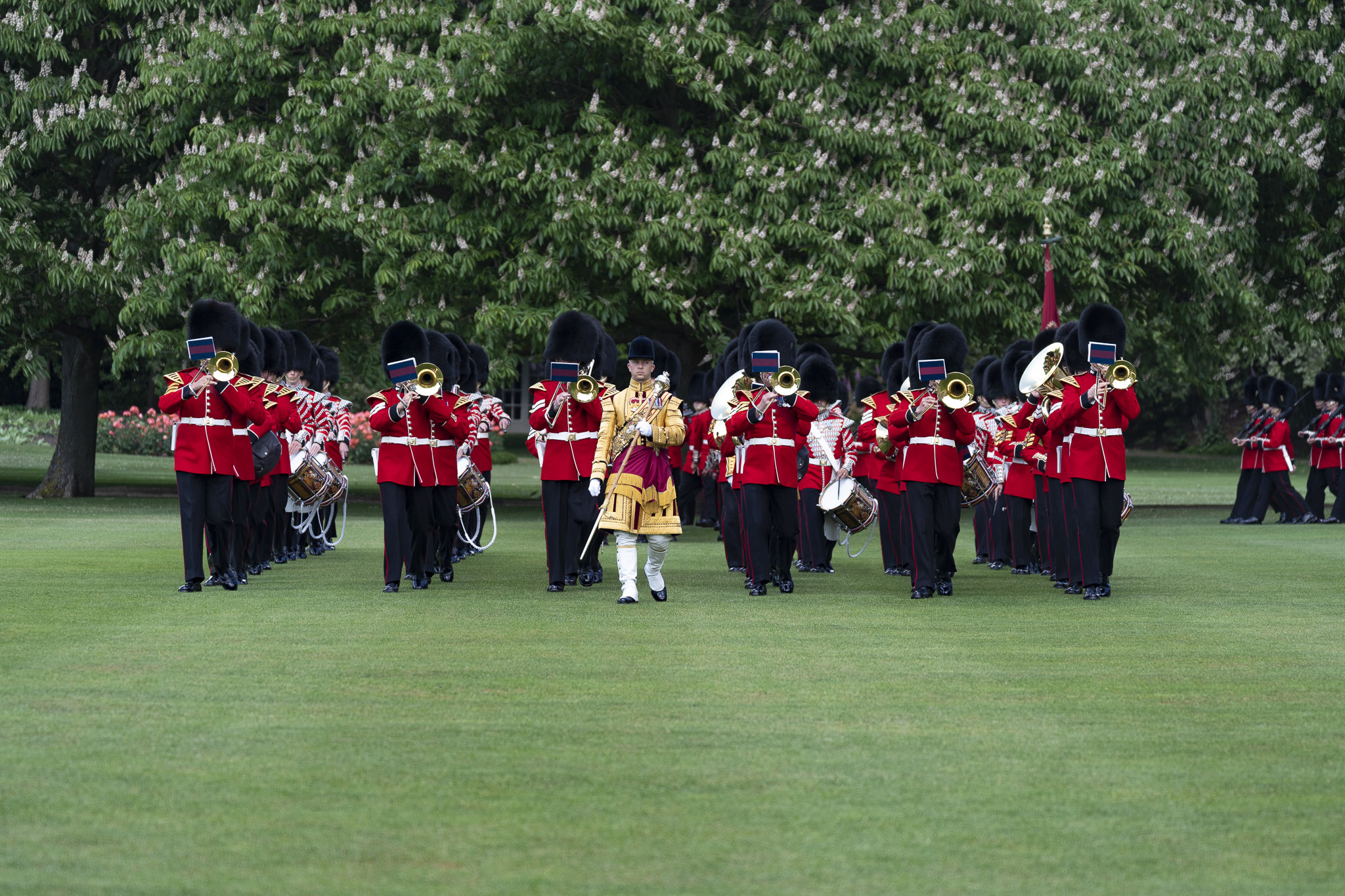
The band in the Garden at Buckingham Palace in 2019.

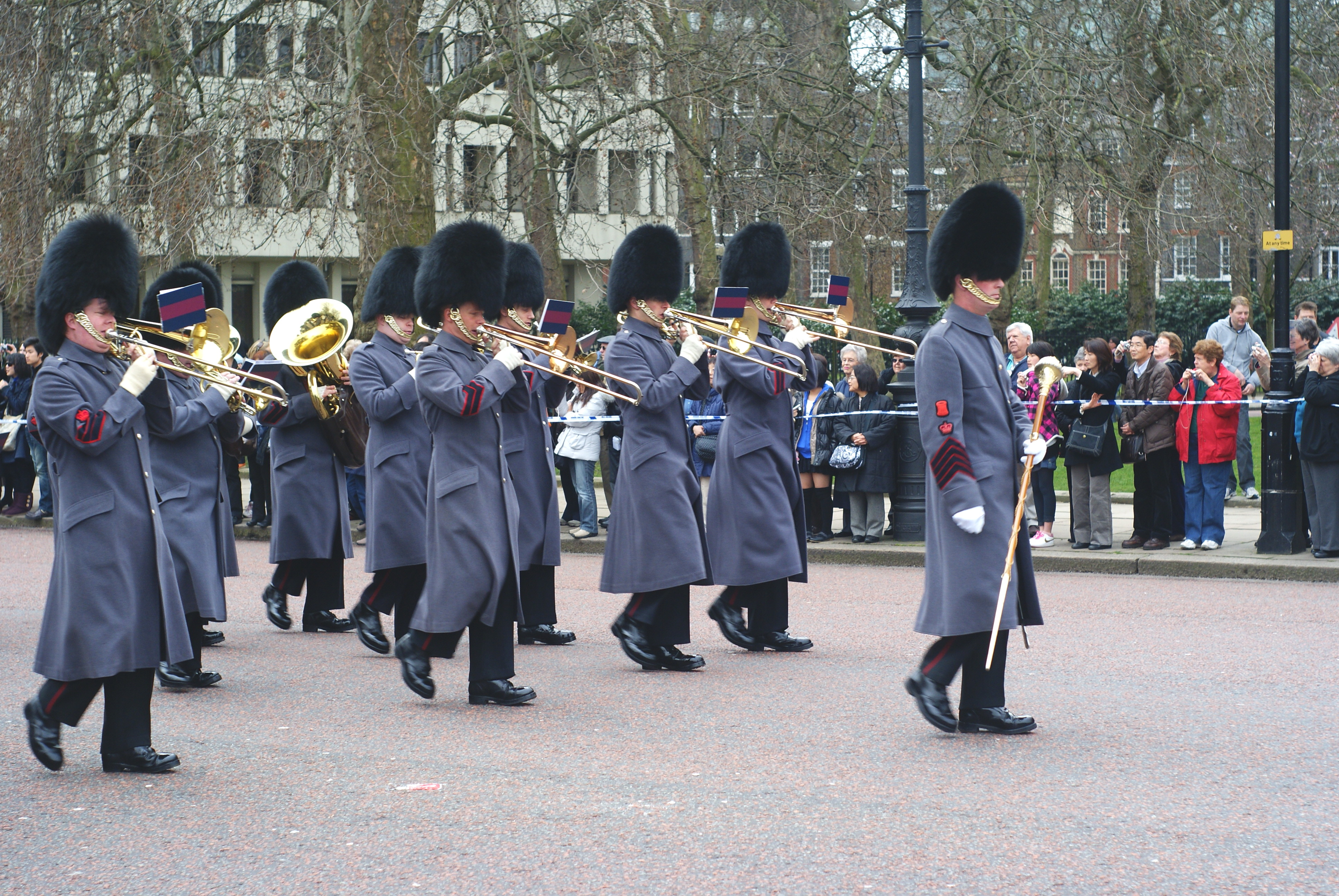
The Marching band in 2010.

== Functions ==
The Band of the Grenadier Guards plays regularly at various events as part of the Massed Bands of the Household Division; it can be found in London performing at the following occasions:

- Changing of the Guard
- Trooping the Colour
- Beating the Retreat

== Uniform ==
Full dress uniform of the Grenadier Guards worn on ceremonial occasions as in the band or the Household Division includes a tall and heavy fur cap, called bearskin.

== See also ==
- Coldstream Guards Band
- Irish Guards Band
- Scots Guards Band
- Welsh Guards Band
- Household Division
