= Esther (de Hartmann opera) =

1946 Opera by Thomas de Hartmann

Esther is an opera by Thomas de Hartmann set to his own libretto based on the 1689 tragedy by Racine.

== Background ==
The opera was completed in 1946 apart for some of its orchestration, but was not performed during the rest of de Hartmann's life. The 2026 recording with Kirill Karabits uses the manuscript score and the manuscript piano score. The only orchestral parts available are for the dances, in formats for big orchestra and for smaller orchestra. In 1976, an English-language concert performance of an abridged version was given in Syracuse, New York, with a recording of it distributed privately on two LPs. The score consists of "extended monologues and static tableaux", with a few orchestral interludes, a divertissement of national dances, along with large choral moments. Karabits views it as "a dramatic work, it's intense, it's complex - even though the story is quite simple, which is why I also feel it's kind of more like an oratorio than an opera".

A suite of four dances from Act 3 by de Hartmann himself was taken up by Leopold Stokowski and Nikolai Malko.

== Performance history ==
A complete recording was made in Poole, Dorset in 2025 with Corinne Winters in the title role and the Grange Festival Chorus and Bournemouth Symphony Orchestra conducted by Kirill Karabits.

== Roles ==
Role	Voice type	Premiere Cast (Conductor: )
Esther	soprano	
Elise	soprano	
Cantor and Haman	tenor	
Mordecai	baritone	
King Achasuerus	baritone	
Hydapse	baritone	
Chorus and dancers

== Synopsis ==
The plot concerns the Persian Queen Esther, who is persuaded by her uncle Mordecai to reveal her Jewish identity to King Achasuerus, at the risk of her life, in order to convince the king to rescind the edict to exterminate the enslaved Hebrews.
