= Fred Godfrey (bandmaster) =

Frederick Adolphus Godfrey, better known as Fred Godfrey, (1837, London – August 28, 1882, London) was an English bandmaster and music arranger. He was the son of bandmaster Charles Godfrey, the brother of bandmaster Daniel Godfrey, and the uncle of bandmaster Daniel Eyers Godfrey. He was trained as a musician at the Royal Academy of Music. In 1863 he succeeded his father as bandmaster of the Coldstream Guards; a post he held until his retirement in 1880.

He is best remembered for his work as a music arranger, and some of his arrangements have remained in use. The Lucy Long variations for bassoon and wind ensemble were regularly performed at the early Henry Wood Promenade Concerts. His various Reminiscences, arrangements of music by Daniel Auber, Donizetti and Giuseppe Verdi among other composers, also appeared in the Proms.
