= Richard Austin (conductor) =

Former chief conductor of the Bournemouth Municipal Orchestra

Richard Dennis Oliver Austin FRCM (26 December 1903, in Birkenhead – 1 April 1989, in Reading) was the chief conductor of the Bournemouth Municipal Orchestra from 1934 until 1940 and later a professor of the Royal College of Music.

== Early life ==
The son of composer Frederic Austin and his wife Amy, Austin was educated at Gresham's School, Holt, the Royal College of Music, and in Munich. At Gresham's, he acted in school plays, in 1921 playing Benedick in Much Ado About Nothing and in 1922 Hortensio in The Taming of the Shrew, opposite W. H. Auden as Katherina.

== Career ==
After his second half-year of training in Munich, Austin became an assistant conductor for the Royal College's opera class. He was assistant conductor and chorus master for a production of Mr Pepys at the Everyman Theatre, Hampstead, and for other theatrical shows. Adrian Boult invited him to assist with an opera season in Bristol, and when Boult was obliged to go to Egypt Austin assumed the lead. He was then asked to be conductor of the small professional Glen Pavilion orchestra in the city, and with them he made his first broadcast on the BBC. In 1929, he became Conductor for three years with the Carl Rosa Opera Company, touring throughout Great Britain, and then in 1933 worked briefly with the short-lived Metropolitan Opera Company. The following year, while conducting a star-studded production of The Golden Toy at the London Coliseum with Peggy Ashcroft, Wilfred Lawson, Nellie Wallace, and Lupino Lane, Austin saw an advertisement for the post of musical director to the Bournemouth Municipal Orchestra.

Chosen from a large number of applicants to succeed Sir Dan Godfrey, from 1934 to 1940 Austin was musical director of the Bournemouth Corporation, that is, he was the chief conductor of the Bournemouth Municipal Orchestra, which is now the Bournemouth Symphony Orchestra. In 1935 he married the 'cellist Leily Howell, whom he had met when she played a concerto with the Bournemouth orchestra. During his years on the south coast, Austin was expected to conduct three concerts a week in the winter and more in summer; requiring him to greatly expand his repertoire. For the annual festival, Austin continued the tradition of Godfrey in inviting eminent musicians to take part. These included Thomas Beecham, Henry Wood, Hamilton Harty, and Igor Stravinsky.

Austin resigned from the Municipal Orchestra in 1940, when the Bournemouth Corporation cut the complement to only 24 players. From 1941, for the rest of the Second World War he served as Music Advisor, Northern Command, ENSA. Following the war, he became a professor at the Royal College of Music, serving there from 1946 to 1976, when he retired, and was also the college's Director of Opera from 1955 to 1976.

Concurrently, Austin served as music director to the New Era Concert Society (1947–1957) and was a guest conductor at Sadler's Wells Theatre, with other London and provincial orchestras in the United Kingdom, and overseas in the Netherlands, Belgium, Germany, Spain, Sweden, Switzerland, Finland, Yugoslavia, Czechoslovakia, Cuba, Mexico, South Africa, the United States, and also in South America.

== Recording ==
Austin recorded a selection of works by Balfour Gardiner in May 1955 for Argo, with Alexander Young, the Goldsmiths' Choral Union and the London Symphony Orchestra (Overture to a Comedy, Shepherd Fennel's Dance, April, Philomela). Later that year with cellist André Navarra he set down recordings of Bloch's Schelomo and Tchaikovsky's Variations on a Rococo Theme Op.30 for Parlophone. A recording of The Beggar's Opera featured Dennis Noble, Carmen Prietto, Martha Lipton, Roderick Jones, Marjorie Westbury, John Cameron and William McAlpine.
