= Daniel Godfrey (bandmaster) =

British bandmaster and composer

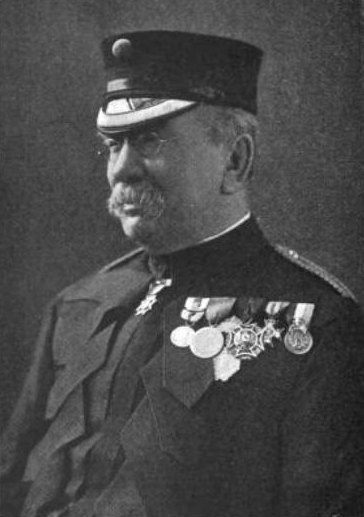
Photograph in The Sketch, 8 July 1903

Daniel Godfrey (4 September 1831 – 30 June 1903) was a British bandmaster, composer and arranger of compositions for military bands. He was for many years bandmaster of the Grenadier Guards. He was the father of the Bournemouth conductor Daniel Eyers Godfrey.

== Life ==
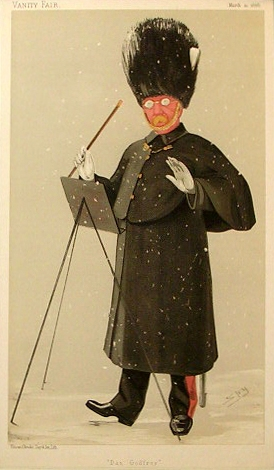
Caricature of Daniel Godfrey in Vanity Fair, 10 March 1888

He was born in Westminster in 1831, eldest of four sons of Charles Godfrey, bandmaster of the Coldstream Guards for fifty years. His eldest brother, George William Godfrey, was well known as a playwright. His brother Fred Godfrey was also a bandmaster. Daniel Godfrey was educated at the Royal Academy of Music, where he subsequently became professor of military music and was elected a fellow. In his early days he was a flute player in the orchestra of Louis-Antoine Jullien and at the Royal Italian Opera.

In 1856, on the recommendation of Sir Michael Costa, he was, through the influence of the Prince Consort Albert, appointed bandmaster of the Grenadier Guards. One of his first duties was to play into London the brigade of guards returning from the Crimean War. In 1863 he composed his "Guards" waltz for the ball given by the officers of the guards to the Prince and Princess of Wales, later King Edward VII and Queen Alexandra, on their marriage. This became popular, as did his "Mabel" and "Hilda" waltzes. He was also successful as an arranger of compositions for military bands.

Godfrey made a tour with his band in the United States in 1876, in celebration of the centenary of American Independence. It was the first visit of an English military band since the creation of the republic, and a special Act of Parliament had to be passed to authorise it.

At the Golden Jubilee of Queen Victoria in 1887, he was promoted second-lieutenant – the first bandmaster who received a commission in the army – and he was decorated with the Jubilee Medal. In 1891 he reached the age limit of sixty, but his period of service was extended for five years. He retired from the army on 4 September 1896, with the reputation of England's leading bandmaster.

Subsequently, he formed a private military band which played at the chief exhibitions in England, and with which he twice toured America and Canada. A number of waltzes he composed for military band gained popularity. He died in Beeston, Nottinghamshire, on 30 June 1903 aged 71.

Godfrey married Joyce Boyles in 1856 and there were two sons and three daughters. His eldest son, Dan Godfrey (1868–1939), became a successful conductor in Bournemouth.
