= Bournemouth Symphony Orchestra =

English orchestra

Bournemouth Symphony Orchestra (BSO)
- Orchestra
- Former name: Bournemouth Municipal Orchestra
- Founded: 1893
- Concert hall: Lighthouse, Poole, Dorset
- Principal conductor: Mark Wigglesworth
- Website: bsolive.com

The Bournemouth Symphony Orchestra (BSO) is an English orchestra, founded in 1893 and originally based in Bournemouth. With a remit to serve the South and South West of England, the BSO is administratively based in the adjacent town of Poole, since 1979. The orchestra is resident at Lighthouse in Poole, with other major concert series given at Portsmouth Guildhall, the Great Hall of Exeter University and Bristol Beacon.

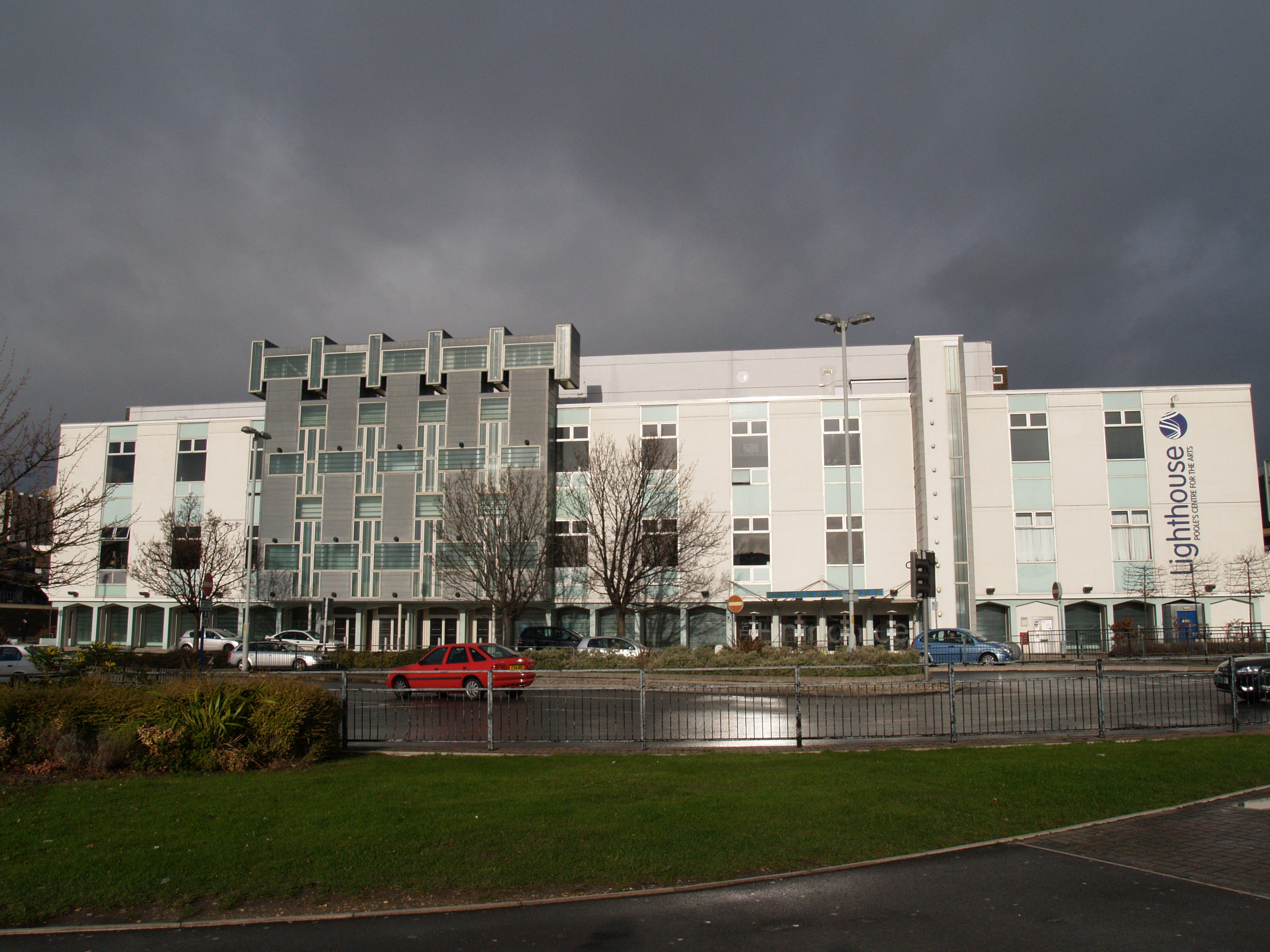
The orchestra is resident at the Lighthouse arts centre in Poole

Principal conductors of the orchestra have included Sir Dan Godfrey, Rudolf Schwarz, Constantin Silvestri, Paavo Berglund, Andrew Litton, Marin Alsop, and Kirill Karabits. The principal conductor was Mark Wigglesworth as of the 2024–2025 season, and the chief executive was Dougie Scarfe.

== History ==
=== Origins to 1934: The Godfrey era ===
The orchestra was founded as Bournemouth Municipal Orchestra in 1893 by Dan Godfrey as a group of 30 wind players and a drummer, though several of the instrumentalists – as is the current practice with military musicians – were proficient in both wind and string instruments. This flexible approach meant that the musicians could form a military band for open-air concerts (playing on Bournemouth Pier) or a more formal classical ensemble for indoor programmes. The group gave its first concert on Whit Monday 1893 at the Winter Gardens, with its first classical concert in October that year.

The band quickly expanded to become a full orchestra, gaining a reputation for championing British music. Edward Elgar and Gustav Holst (among others) conducted the orchestra in their own works. The orchestra gave the UK premieres of major works by Richard Strauss, Camille Saint-Saëns and Pyotr Ilyich Tchaikovsky. On 14 December 1903, the Orchestra gave its 500th symphony concert, conducted by Godfrey; a souvenir booklet listed all the works played by the orchestra since its inception, noting any first performances. The Bournemouth Municipal Choir, founded by Godfrey in 1911, sang regularly with the orchestra.

From 1922 to 1940, an Easter Festival was an important feature in the Bournemouth calendar. In 1927, the Festival was devoted to music of British women composers. In 1934, Godfrey retired as principal conductor, having conducted over 2,000 symphony concerts.

The first recording by the Bournemouth Municipal Orchestra was made in 1914 and occasional records were issued during Godfrey's tenure: Godfrey's recordings included works such as Ferdinand Hérold's overture to Zampa, Daniel Auber's overtures The Bronze Horse and The Crown Diamonds, or Samuel Coleridge-Taylor's Petite Suite de Concert, along with "novelty items" with titles such as 'Slippery Sticks' and 'Whispering Pines' by members of the orchestra and featuring them as soloists.

Godfrey remains the longest serving principal conductor of the orchestra, and his stewardship ensured that, unlike many of the seaside orchestras that functioned from the end of the 19th century up until the outbreak of World War II, the Bournemouth Municipal Orchestra established an ongoing tradition of music making. Godfrey's programmes mixed populist elements, such as variety acts and light music, with extracts from more serious pieces. Alongside these, he instituted a series of symphony concerts which introduced diverse repertoire. He cultivated connections with most of the prominent British composers of the day including Edward Elgar, Hamilton Harty, Alexander Mackenzie, Hubert Parry, Charles Villiers Stanford, Ethel Smyth, Gustav Holst and the Australian Percy Grainger.

From the very beginning, Godfrey had a difficult relationship with the Bournemouth Borough Council who saw the orchestra as a commercial concern which needed to pay its way. As part of Bournemouth's visitor attractions, any request for expansion of the orchestra or changes to their contracts were the subject of exhaustive debates in the Council chamber. However, in general, Godfrey was successful at balancing both high artistic standards and box-office success.

=== 1934–1947: Austin, Birch and wartime austerity ===
Between 1929 and 1934 Stanley Wilson became a regular guest conductor. After Godfrey's retirement, the task of sustaining the orchestra fell to Richard Austin. Radio broadcasts took place from the Pavilion and a number of celebrated composers visited during this time, including Igor Stravinsky, William Walton, Ernest John Moeran, Sergei Rachmaninov, Roger Quilter, Balfour Gardiner and Percy Grainger. At the outbreak of war, the orchestra was cut from 61 to 35, and then in 1940 to only 24 players. Austin resigned in the same year and Montague Birch helped keep the orchestra going during the war, giving many 'popular' concerts. Whilst the Municipal Orchestra struggled in a depleted state, the war years saw concerts in the town by the Wessex Philharmonic, a freelance orchestra conducted by Reginald Goodall, which included some ex-members of the BMO.

=== 1947–1954: Schwarz and Groves ===
After the end of the war, the orchestra found a new home at the 'new' Winter Gardens. In 1947, Rudolf Schwarz was appointed musical director of a re-formed orchestra of 60. He conducted the orchestra in its first concert in London since 1911, at the Royal Albert Hall in 1948, and in two concerts at the Royal Festival Hall during the Festival of Britain in 1951. Schwarz's tenure was marked by artistic consolidation, but also financial troubles.

Charles Groves took over as musical director in 1951, but a rising annual deficit and termination of players' contracts caused a crisis, averted only by support from the Winter Gardens Society. In 1952, a plan to merge the BMO with the City of Birmingham Symphony Orchestra was avoided by an arrangement with the Arts Council for the orchestra to accompany Welsh National Opera for several weeks. The continuation of the orchestra was only secured by the formation of the Western Orchestral Society. In 1954, the orchestra changed its name to the Bournemouth Symphony Orchestra. At the inaugural concert, Groves and Sir Thomas Beecham shared the podium.

=== 1954–1969: The Silvestri years ===
From 1954 the BSO developed its present role of giving concerts at more venues in the southwest of England. Other work included accompanying the Bolshoi Ballet on their first British tour in 1956.

In 1957 Groves and the orchestra made commercial recordings, for Classics Club, (with a local engineer from Ronaldsons of Southbourne), of Beethoven's 4th Symphony, Brahms's Academic Festival Overture and Bizet's L'Arlésienne Suite.

In 1962, Constantin Silvestri became principal conductor and raised the standard and profile of the orchestra, with an appearance at the Edinburgh Festival in 1963, a first European tour in 1965, notable recordings and regular radio broadcasts. The orchestra gained its first international recognition during Silvestri's tenure, such as in a joint performance with the Leipzig Gewandhaus Orchestra in the Winter Gardens by the combined string sections of both orchestras, playing Edward Elgar's Introduction and Allegro. His tenure was cut short by his death from cancer in 1969. His recorded legacy includes Vaughan Williams's Fantasia on a Theme by Thomas Tallis, Rimsky-Korsakov's Scheherazade, and a 1966 recording of Tchaikovsky's 1812 Overture with the additional forces of the Band of HM Royal Marines.

Recent releases on BBC Legends, transferred from recordings of live concerts given at the Winter Gardens and elsewhere during Silvestri's tenure, provide a vivid record of the orchestra's style in this era. These include accounts of Tchaikovsky's Manfred Symphony and Elgar's Enigma Variations.

=== 1969–1972: Hurst ===
In addition to its roster of principal conductors, other conductors affiliated with the orchestra have included George Hurst, who served as de facto principal conductor from 1969 to 1972, between the tenures of Silvestri and Paavo Berglund, without having been formally appointed to the post. Hurst ensured continuity during that conductorial interregnum.

=== 1972–1979: Berglund ===
Paavo Berglund's tenure as principal conductor from 1972 to 1979 included commercial recordings such as the complete symphonies of Jean Sibelius for EMI. The Bournemouth Symphony Orchestra and Paavo Berglund made the world premiere recording of the Kullervo by Jean Sibelius. Berglund led Sibelius Centenary Concerts with the Bournemouth Symphony Orchestra in 1965, and became the principal conductor in 1972, concluding his tenure in 1979. Berglund led the Bournemouth Symphony Orchestra with distinction, significantly raising the performing standards, as can be heard from the many recordings made by it for EMI. During this period, Nordic repertoire became a staple of the orchestra.

Roger Preston, co-principal cello, who worked with Berglund on many occasions, has said:

Anyone who played with the Bournemouth Symphony Orchestra in the largest wooden church in the world, Kerimäki Church, Finland, as part of the BSO's 1981 tour will tell that it was a truly unforgettable experience. On this tour we played all the Sibelius' Symphonies, with Paavo on spectacular form. Many of Paavo's comments, criticisms and demands are as fresh in my mind as though it were only yesterday. He remains, for me one of the best, if not the best conductor that I have ever played for and am so grateful to have caught the latter days of Paavo's extraordinarily fruitful relationship with the BSO.

The Finnish newspaper Helsingin Sanomat told in their 80th year birthday interview of Paavo Berglund that his one-time assistant from Bournemouth, Simon Rattle, called him "one of the last great", and uses Berglund's bowings in his Sibelius performances. The Helsinki Philharmonic Orchestra always gets very suspicious when a visiting maestro wants to change Paavo's Sibelius markings. The visiting maestro is silenced by saying that the markings are Sibelius'.

Recordings by Bournemouth Symphony Orchestra and Paavo Berglund:

- Bliss: Suite from Miracle in the Gorbals; Cello Concerto (with Arto Noras). Bournemouth Symphony Orchestra. 1977, Southampton Guildhall. (EMI ASD 3342)
- Britten: Violin Concerto (with Ida Haendel). Bournemouth Symphony Orchestra. 12 June 1977. (EMI ASD 3843 CDM7642022)
- Franck: Symphony; Symphonic Variations (with Sylvia Kersenbaum). Bournemouth Symphony Orchestra. 1976. (EMI ASD 3308)
- Glazunov: Piano Concerto (with John Ogdon); Yardumian: Passacaglia, Recitative & Fugue. Bournemouth Symphony Orchestra. 1977. (EMI ASD 3367)
- Grieg: Peer Gynt Suite; Alfven: Swedish Rhapsody; Järnefelt: Praeludium; Berceuse. Bournemouth Symphony Orchestra. (EMI)
- Grieg: Symphonic Dances; Old Norwegian Romance with Variations. Bournemouth Symphony Orchestra. 1982. (EMI ASD 4170)
- Nielsen: Symphony No. 5. Bournemouth Symphony Orchestra. 1975. (EMI ASD 3063)
- Prokofiev: Summer Night Suite. Bournemouth Symphony Orchestra. 1975. (EMI ASD 3141)
- Rimsky-Korsakov: The Golden Cockerel Suite. Bournemouth Symphony Orchestra. 1975. (EMI ASD 3141)
- Rimsky-Korsakov: May Night Overture; Glazunov: Valse de Concert No. 1; Glinka: Valse Fantaisie; Sibelius: Intermezzo and Alla Marcia from Karelia Suite; Shalaster: Dance "Liana". Bournemouth Symphony Orchestra. (EMI)
- Shostakovich: Symphonies 5, 6, 7, 10, 11. Bournemouth Symphony Orchestra. 30–31 July 1975, No. 1 Studio, Abbey Road, London (No. 5). Jan 1974, Guildhall, Southampton (No. 7). 1975 (No. 10). Dec 1978 (No. 11). (EMI)
- Shostakovich: Cello Concerto No. 1; Walton: Cello Concerto (with Paul Tortelier). Bournemouth Symphony Orchestra. 7–8 Jan 1973, Southampton Guildhall. (EMI)
- Shostakovich: Concerto No. 1 for Piano, Trumpet and Strings (with Cristina Ortiz and Rodney Senior); Piano Concerto No. 2 (with Cristina Ortiz); Three Fantastic Dances. Bournemouth Symphony Orchestra. Sep 1975. (EMI)
- Sibelius: En saga; The Oceanides; Pohjola's Daughter; Luonnotar (with Taru Valjakka); Pelleas et Melisande (excerpts). Bournemouth Symphony Orchestra. (EMI ESD7159)
- Sibelius: Finlandia; The Swan of Tuonela; Lemminkäinen's return; Intermezzo from Karelia Suite; Nocturne, Elegie, Musette, Valse Triste from King Kristian II suite. Bournemouth Symphony Orchestra. (EMI 1 C 063-05 011 Q)
- Sibelius: Complete Symphonies 1–7 and Orchestral Works (Including World Premiere Recording of Kullervo Symphony). Bournemouth Symphony Orchestra. 1976 (No. 1). 1978 (No. 2). 20 June 1977 (No. 3). ? (No. 4). June 1973 (No. 5). 1976 (No. 6). 1973 (No. 7). Southampton Guildhall. Dec. 1970, Southampton Guildhall (Kullervo). (EMI)
- Sibelius: Violin Concerto; Serenades Nos. 1, 2; Humoresque No. 5. (with Ida Haendel). Bournemouth Symphony Orchestra. July 1975, Southampton Guildhall. (EMI)
- Vaughan Williams: Symphony No. 6; Oboe Concerto (with John Williams). Bournemouth Symphony Orchestra. 1 April 1975, Southampton Guildhall. (EMI ASD 3127)
- Walton: Violin Concerto (with Ida Haendel). Bournemouth Symphony Orchestra. 1978, Southampton Guildhall. (EMI ASD3843 CDM 764202 2)

=== 1980–1982: Segal ===
The Israeli conductor Uri Segal succeeded Berglund from 1980 to 1982. During his tenure, the BSO recorded suites from Benjamin Britten's Gloriana and The Prince of the Pagodas.

=== 1982–2008: Russians and Americans ===
Rudolf Barshai served as the BSO's principal conductor from 1982 to 1988. His BSO recordings included the Symphony No. 8 of Dmitri Shostakovich, and a Gramophone Award-winning release of Tchaikovsky's Piano Concerto No. 2 from 1988.

The American conductor Andrew Litton first conducted the BSO in 1986, and subsequently became the BSO's principal conductor from 1988 to 1994, the first American principal conductor of the orchestra. Litton subsequently was named the BSO's Conductor Laureate. His recordings with the BSO include William Walton's symphonies and concertos for Decca, and the complete Tchaikovsky symphonies (including the Manfred Symphony) for Virgin Classics. In February 1997 Litton's recording of Walton's Belshazzar's Feast with the BSO, Bournemouth Symphony Chorus and soloist Bryn Terfel won a Grammy Award.

Principal guest conductors of the BSO have included Kees Bakels (1990–2000) and Richard Hickox (1992–1995).

Yakov Kreizberg was principal conductor from 1995 to 2000. Whilst he made no commercial recordings with the orchestra, he and the BSO toured the United States, including their debut at Carnegie Hall in April 1997. Kreizberg and the BSO also performed a 3-day residency at the Musikverein, Vienna in 1999.

Marin Alsop, principal conductor from September 2002 to 2008, was the BSO's first female principal conductor and the first female principal conductor of a UK orchestra. Her time with the orchestra continued the programming of American repertoire from Litton's tenure, which she often introduced to the audience from the podium in the style of her mentor Leonard Bernstein. She conducted all of the Mahler symphonies except the Symphony No. 8. She and the BSO recorded several CDs for Naxos, both European and American repertoire.

=== The present ===
In November 2007, the BSO announced the appointment Kirill Karabits as their 13th principal conductor, the first Ukrainian principal conductor of a UK orchestra. Karabits held the title of orchestra's principal conductor-designate for the 2008–2009 season, and became principal conductor with the 2009–2010 season. With the BSO, Karabits made his first conducting appearance at The Proms in August 2009.

The BSO's first commercial recording with Karabits (of Rodion Shchedrin's Concertos for Orchestra Nos 4 and 5) was released on the Naxos label in April 2010. The BSO and Karabits have also recorded music of Aram Khachaturian for the Onyx label. In August 2011, the BSO extended Karabits' contract as principal conductor through the 2015–2016 season. In April 2015, the BSO announced that Karabits had signed a rolling contract as its principal conductor, to extend his tenure to a minimum date of 2018. In January 2023, the orchestra announced that Karabits is to stand down as its chief conductor at the close of the 2023–2024 season, and subsequently to take the title of conductor laureate and serve as artistic director of the orchestra's Voices from the East project.

In November 2021, the orchestra announced the appointment of Mark Wigglesworth as its next principal guest conductor, with immediate effect. Chloé van Soeterstède first guest-conducted the orchestra in 2022. In March 2024, the orchestra announced simultaneously the appointments of Wigglesworth as its next chief conductor and of van Soeterstède as its next principal guest conductor, both effective with the 2024–2025 season and with initial contracts of four years for each conductor. The Calleva Assistant Conductor for the 2024–25 season is Enyi Okpara.

== Discography ==
=== Studio albums ===
Title	Album details
Rawsthorne: Symphonies Nos. 1-3	Release date: January 31, 2005; Label: Naxos

== Offshoots ==
In 1968, the Bournemouth Sinfonietta was founded, with a complementary remit to tour the smaller towns of the south and west, as well as concentrating on classical repertoire. Despite artistic acclaim throughout its history, financial difficulties and funding withdrawals led to its sudden closure in November 1999. Since then, sections of the BSO occasionally tour to smaller venues in the south and west.

Kokoro is a contemporary music ensemble of the Bournemouth Symphony Orchestra, consisting of players from the orchestra and freelance musicians (formed 1994).

== Concert programme ==
The Bournemouth Symphony Orchestra currently gives around 150 concerts a year. In September 1995 the orchestra, conducted by Richard Hickox, was the first to give a complete concert cycle of the symphonies of Ralph Vaughan Williams.

The orchestra under Paavo Berglund made the world premiere recording of Sibelius's Kullervo in 1970. Other notable recordings include Deryck Cooke's completion of Gustav Mahler's Symphony No. 10, conducted by Simon Rattle; Elgar's In the South (Alassio) with Constantin Silvestri, Tchaikovsky's 2nd Piano Concerto with Rudolf Barshai and Peter Donohoe as soloist (with Nigel Kennedy and Steven Isserlis in the slow movement); Anthony Payne's completion of Elgar's 3rd Symphony with Paul Daniel, and Leonard Bernstein's Chichester Psalms with Marin Alsop.

The orchestra recorded a complete cycle of the Tippett symphonies for Chandos, the Vaughan Williams symphonies for Naxos (with Kees Bakels for seven of the symphonies and Paul Daniel for A Sea Symphony and the 4th). The orchestra has also recorded for Naxos a complete series of the symphonies of Sir Charles Villiers Stanford.

The orchestra performs regularly in the BBC Proms at the Royal Albert Hall and has played in other great halls of the world, such as Carnegie Hall in New York, the Musikverein in Vienna, and the Rudolfinum in Prague.

For many years until his death in 2003, Ron Goodwin gave an annual series of Christmas concerts with the orchestra around the south and west of England.

=== First performances ===
Premieres given by the orchestra include the following:

- Samuel Coleridge-Taylor: Symphony in A minor (1900)
- Ralph Vaughan Williams: Serenade in A minor (1901)
- Gustav Holst: Symphony in F ("The Cotswolds") (1902)
- Charles Villiers Stanford: Clarinet Concerto in A minor Op. 80 (1903)
- Arnold Bax: Tintagel (1921)
- Rutland Boughton: The Queen of Cornwall (1924)
- Rutland Boughton: Symphony No. 2 (1927)
- William Alwyn: Piano Concerto No. 1 (1930)
- Cyril Scott: Concertino for Two Pianos and Orchestra (1931)
- George Lloyd: Symphony No. 1 (1933)
- Percy Whitlock: Symphony in G minor for organ and orchestra (1937)
- Ernest Bloch: Deux Interludes symphonique de Macbeth (1939)
- Malcolm Arnold: Overture 'The Smoke' (1948)
- Malcolm Arnold: Symphony No. 2 (1953)
- Robert Simpson: Piano Concerto (1967)
- Malcolm Williamson: Symphony No. 2 (1969)
- Gerhard Schurmann: Piano Concerto (1973)
- Robert Simpson: Symphony No. 9 (1987)
- Alexander Lokshin: Symphony No 1 ("Requiem") (1988)
- Gerhard Schurmann: The Gardens of Exile (1991)
- George Lloyd: A Symphonic Mass (1993)
- John Tavener: Theophany (1994)
- Norman Hallam: Clarinet Concerto (1998)
- Pēteris Vasks: Second Symphony (1999)
- Ralph Vaughan Williams: The Garden of Proserpine (composed 1899; premiere recording: 2011)

== Media ==
In addition to the first acoustic recordings by the Bournemouth Municipal Orchestra in 1914, early mass media activities included radio broadcasts from the original Winter Gardens on 2LO in the 1920s. Subsequently, the BMO gave regular concerts on the BBC, including Godfrey's farewell concert. The Pathé archive contains short films of the orchestra conducted by Dan Godfrey and Richard Austin made at the Pavilion Theatre in 1930 and 1937.

In 1963, the nave of Winchester Cathedral was cleared for the first time in several hundred years to enable a live television broadcast of the orchestra, conducted by Constantin Silvestri, performing Wagner's "Good Friday Music" from Parsifal.

In the 1970s the orchestra appeared in Southern Television's Music in Camera series, conducted by Owain Arwel Hughes. The Bournemouth Symphony Orchestra recording of Gustav Holst's The Planets, conducted by George Hurst, was used on the soundtrack of Nicolas Roeg's film The Man Who Fell to Earth.

The orchestra were featured in a short-lived series of programmes on the local commercial radio station 2CR. Members of the orchestra and Bournemouth Symphony Chorus recorded a jingle for the Yellow Buses, Bournemouth's local bus company.

== Principal conductors ==
- Sir Dan Godfrey (1893–1934)
- Richard Austin (1934–1939)
- Montague Birch (1939–1947)
- Rudolf Schwarz (1947–1951)
- Sir Charles Groves (1951–1961)
- Constantin Silvestri (1962–1969)
- Paavo Berglund (1972–1979)
- Uri Segal (1980–1982)
- Rudolf Barshai (1982–1988)
- Andrew Litton (1988–1994)
- Yakov Kreizberg (1995–2000)
- Marin Alsop (2002–2008)
- Kirill Karabits (2009–2024)
- Mark Wigglesworth (2024–2028)
