= Daniel Eyers Godfrey =

British music conductor

Godfrey (front left) in 1910 with Hubert Parry and Edward German (back) and Alexander Mackenzie and Charles Villiers Stanford

Speech by Godfrey
given at the Pavilion Theatre, Bournemouth on 30 September 1934 on the occasion of his retirement as conductor of the Bournemouth Municipal Orchestra

Sir Daniel Eyers Godfrey (20 June 1868 – 20 July 1939) was a British music conductor and member of a musical dynasty that included his father Daniel Godfrey (1831–1903), his uncle Fred Godfrey, and his grandfather Charles Godfrey. His son, also Dan Godfrey, was also a musician, station manager at BBC Manchester in the 1920s, and the first full-time conductor of the BBC Wireless Orchestra (1924–1926).

He was born in London, a member of a distinguished family of English bandmasters, and son of the bandmaster of the Grenadier Guards - (to whom the waltz Les Grenadiers, Op. 207, by Émile Waldteufel was dedicated.)

He founded the Bournemouth Municipal Orchestra in 1893 and remained its leading conductor for 41 years, until 1934. Although he was contracted by the Bournemouth Corporation to conduct a seasonal band of 30 musicians, his ambition was to build a permanent symphony orchestra in the town. His time at Bournemouth was particularly notable for his championship of British music.

Godfrey gave the first performance of the reconstruction of Vaughan Williams's A London Symphony on 11 February 1915, and made acoustic recordings of excerpts of the work in 1923 and an abridged version in 1925. He also made electric recordings of Mozart's Jupiter Symphony, Dvořák's Slavonic Dances, Debussy's Petite Suite and Grieg's Sigurd Jorsalfar March with the London Symphony Orchestra.

Godfrey and the Bournemouth Municipal Orchestra made several gramophone records for HMV from 1914 to 1930. He was knighted in 1922 'for valuable services to British music' largely as a result of a vigorous campaign on his behalf from Ethel Smyth. He died in Bournemouth in 1939 aged 71 and is buried at St Peter's Church.
