= List of compositions for cello and piano =

This is a list of compositions for cello and piano. It includes sonatas as well as other pieces for cello and piano.

== A ==
- Carl Friedrich Abel
  - Several sonatas
- Hans Abrahamsen
  - Glansbilleder - Scraps (1973)
- Thomas Adès
  - Lieux retrouvés (2009)
- Vasif Adigozalov
  - Sonatina for Cello and Piano (1957)
  - Sonata for Cello (1987)
- Miguel del Águila
  - Silence
- Kalevi Aho
  - Sonata for Cello and Piano (2019)
- Franco Alfano
  - Sonata for Cello and Piano (1925)
- Charles-Valentin Alkan
  - Cello sonata "Sonate de concert", Op. 47 in E (1857)
- Anatoly Alexandrov
  - Andante Pathetico for cello and piano opus 17 (1915–1921)
  - Cello Sonata in G major, Op. 112 (1981–1982)
- Franghiz Ali-Zadeh
  - Habil-Sayagy In Habil's Style for cello and piano
- Fikret Amirov
  - Elegy for cello and piano (1948)
  - Poem-Monologue for cello and piano (1948)
- Gilbert Amy
  - Mémoire (1989)
- Louis Andriessen
  - Welk interval vind je het mooist (2012)
  - Elegy (1957)
- Tanya Anisimova
  - Icelandic Ballad (2007)
  - Mexico-Mexico (2005)
- Boris Arapov
  - Sonata for cello and piano (1985)
- Anton Arensky
  - Two Pieces, Op. 12, for cello and piano (Little Ballade, Capriccioso Dance)
  - Four Pieces, Op. 56, for cello and piano (Oriental Melody, Romance, Chant Triste, Humoresque)
- Alexander Arutiunian
  - Impromptu (1941)
  - Poem
- Valery Arzoumanov
  - Six Waltzes for cello and piano opus 170A
- Benjamin Attahir
  - Apres l'ineffable (2018)
- Kurt Atterberg
  - Cello sonata, Op. 27 in B minor (1925; written to be played by any of several instruments)
- Lera Auerbach
  - Twenty-Four Preludes for cello and piano opus 47 (1999)
  - Suite for cello and piano opus 47A (1999)
  - Sonata No. 1 for cello and piano opus 69 (2002) (Dedicated to David Finckel and Wu Han)
- Georges Auric
  - Imaginées 2 (1970)
- Vaja Azarashvili
  - Cello Sonata No. 1 (1961–99)
  - Cello Sonata No. 2 (1976)
  - Five Preludes (2006)

== B ==
- Milton Babbitt
  - Dual for cello and piano (1980)
- Grazyna Bacewicz
  - Mazovian Dance (1951)
- Maria Bach
  - Sonata for cello and piano (1922)
- Henk Badings
  - Cello Sonata No. 1(1929)
  - Cello Sonata No. 2 (1934)
- David N. Baker
  - Sonata for Violoncello and Piano (1973) (Commissioned by Janos Starker)
- Granville Bantock
  - Cello Sonata No. 1 in B minor (1940s)
  - Cello Sonata No. 2 in F♯ minor (1940s)
- Samuel Barber
  - Cello sonata, Op. 6 in C minor (1932)
- Richard Barrett
  - nacht und träume (2003 -2008)
- Béla Bartók
  - Rhapsody 1
  - Sonatina for cello and piano originally for piano (1915) (arr. Varga)
- Rami Bar-Niv
  - Improvisation for cello solo (5 min) (1997)
  - Improvisation for cello and piano (11 min) (2001)
  - Longing for my Father – 7 songs without words for cello and piano (26 min) (2002)
  - Blue-Rag for cello and piano (5 min) (1998)
  - Blue-Rag for 2 cellos (or cello and violin/viola/flute/clarinet/trumpet/oboe/saxophone) and piano (5 min) (1998)
  - Shmateh-Rag for cello and piano (5 min) (2004)
  - Vocalise on Prelude #1 by Bach, for cello and piano (5 min) (1998)
- Arnold Bax
  - Folk-Tale (1918)
  - Cello Sonata in E♭ (1923)
  - Cello Sonatina in D (1933)
  - Legend-Sonata in F♯ minor (1943)
- Amy Beach
  - Five Pieces
- Sally Beamish
  - Iasg (1993)
  - Gala Water (1994)
  - Bridging the Day (1998)
  - Sonata (2000)
- Ludwig van Beethoven
  - Cello sonata No. 1, Op. 5, No. 1 in F major (1796)
  - Cello sonata No. 2, Op. 5, No. 2 in G minor (1796)
  - Cello sonata No. 3, Op. 69 in A (1808)
  - Cello sonata No. 4, Op. 102, No. 1 in C (1815)
  - Cello sonata No. 5, Op. 102, No. 2 in D (1815)
  - Sonata Op. 17 in F (transcription of the Sonata for Horn and piano) (1800)
  - Sonata Op. 64 in E♭ (transcription of String Trio Op.3) (1807)
  - Twelve Variations for cello & piano in F major on Mozart's "Ein Mädchen oder Weibchen," Op. 66 (1796)
  - Twelve Variations for cello & piano in G major on Handel's "See, the Conqu'ring Hero comes," WoO 45 (1796)
  - Seven Variations for cello & piano in E♭ major on Mozart's "Bei Männern," WoO 46 (1801)
- Karol Beffa
  - "Marmor" for cello and piano
- Richard Rodney Bennett
  - Sonata for Cello and Piano (1991)
- William Sterndale Bennett
  - Cello Sonata Op. 32 (1852)
- Erik Bergman
  - Quo Vadis Op.102
- Franz Berwald
  - Grand Duo Op. 7
- Michael Berkeley
  - Etude des fleurs (1979)
  - At A Solemn Wake (2015)
- Christophe Bertrand
  - Crash ? (1999)
- Franz Berwald
  - Grand Duo Op. 7
- Oscar Bianchi
  - Soffio (2013)
- Adolphe Biarent
  - Cello sonata in F♯ minor (1915) ()
- Harrison Birtwistle
  - Lied (7 min) (2006)
  - Bogenstrich (2006–2009)
- Karl-Birger Blomdahl
  - Suite for cello and piano
- Felix Blumenfeld
  - Two Morceaux for cello and piano, opus 19 (1894)
- Luigi Boccherini
  - 19 sonatas for cello and bass, two sonatas for two cellos ()
- Léon Boëllmann
  - Suite, Op. 6 (1890)
  - Variations Symphoniques, Op. 23 (1893)
  - Suite Gothiques, Op. 25 (1895)
  - Deux morceaux, Op. 31 (1896)
  - Cello Sonata, Op. 40 (1897)
  - Pièce ILB 19
- Corentin Boissier
  - Cello Sonata, Op. 21 (2017)
- William Bolcom
  - Decalage (1969)
  - Capriccio (1985)
  - Sonata for Violoncello and Piano (1989)
- Mélanie Hélène Bonis
  - Cello Sonata, Op. 67 (1905)
  - Sérénade pour violoncelle et piano
  - Méditation pour violoncelle et piano
- Antonio Maria Bononcini
  - 12 sonatas, a sonata da camera and a sinfonia for cello and figured bass
- Lili Boulanger
  - D’un soir triste
- Nadia Boulanger
  - 3 Pièces pour violoncelle et piano
- Nimrod Borenstein
  - The Magic Mountain opus 30 (2003)
  - Heroic Elegy opus 67 (2014)
  - Odysseus opus 87 (2019)
- Alexander Borodin
  - Cello sonata in B minor (1860)
- Sergei Bortkiewicz
  - Three Pieces for Cello and Piano, Op. 25 (1922)
  - Cello Sonata, Op. 36 (1924)
- Henriëtte Bosmans
  - Cello Sonata (1919)
  - Three Impressions (Cortège, Nuit calme, En Espagne) (1926)
- Johannes Brahms
  - Cello sonata No. 1, Op. 38 in E minor (1862–65)
  - Cello sonata No. 2, Op. 99 in F major (1886)
  - Violin sonata No. 1, Op. 78 in G major Rain (1878–79), transcribed for cello by Paul Klengel
  - Violin Sonata No. 2, Op. 100 in A major (1886), transcribed for cello by Laszlo Varga
  - Violin Sonata No. 3, Op. 108 in D minor (1886–88), transcribed for cello by Laszlo Varga
- Charlotte Bray
  - Perseus (2015)
- Frank Bridge
  - Elegy, H.47 (1904)
  - Two Short Pieces(1912)
  - Cello Sonata in D minor (1913–17) ()
- Jean-Baptiste Bréval
  - Cello Sonata in C Major
- Benjamin Britten
  - Cello sonata, Op. 65 in C (1960–61) ()
- Earle Brown
  - Music for Cello and Piano (1955)
  - Special Events (1998–99)
- James Francis Brown
  - Prospero's Isle (2006). Also symphonic poem version
- Max Bruch
  - Kol Nidrei, Op. 47 (1881)
  - Canzone, Op. 55 (1891)
  - Adagio nach Keltischen melodien, Op. 56 (1891)
  - Ave Maria, Op. 61 (1892)
  - Vier Stücke, Op. 70 (1897) Vier Stücke, Op. 70 (Bruch)
- Gavin Bryars
  - The South Downs (1995)
  - The North Shore (1995)
  - Lauda (con sordino) (2002)
- Ferruccio Busoni
  - Märchen BV 123 (1879)
  - Serenata Op. 34 BV 196 (1883)
  - Kleine Suite Op. 23, for cello and piano, BV 215 (1886)
  - Kultaselle, ten variations for cello and piano BV 237 (1889)
- Sylvano Bussotti
  - Gran Duo (1977–1978)

== C ==
- Joseph Callaerts
  - Andante Sostenuto Op.16
- José Luis Campana
  - Tangata IV (1994)
- Regis Campo
  - Deux mouvements (2004)
- Matilde Capuis
  - Sonata No. 1 in C Minor for cello and piano
  - Sonata No. 2 in D Minor for cello and piano
- David Carlson
  - Sonata for Cello and Piano (1991) (Carl Fischer Music)
- Elliott Carter
  - Elegy
  - Cello Sonata (1948)
- John Casken
  - Stolen Airs (2015)
- Alfredo Casella
  - Cello Sonata No. 1 (1906)
  - Cello Sonata No. 2 (1926)
  - Notturno (1934)
  - Tarantella (1934)
- Gaspar Cassadó
  - Toccata "After Frescobaldi" 1925
  - Minuetto "After Paderewski"
  - Allegretto Grazioso "After Schubert"
  - Rapsodia del Sur
  - Pastorale "After Couperin"
  - La Pendule, la Fileuse et le Galant 1925
  - Serenade 1925
  - Sonata in A minor 1925
  - Sonata nello stile antico spagnuolo (Sonata in an "Old Spanish Style") 1925
  - Danse du diable vert (Dance of the Green Devil) for violin or cello 1926
  - Lamento de Boabdil 1931
  - Requiebros 1934
  - Partita 1935
  - Archares 1954
  - Morgenlied 1957
- Mario Castelnuovo-Tedesco
  - I Nottambuli. Variazioni Fantastiche for cello and piano, Op. 47
  - Sonata per violoncello e pianoforte, Op. 50 (1928)
  - Chant Hébraique: Vocalise, Op. 53 (1928), arranged for cello and piano (1930)
  - Toccata Op. 83, per violoncello e pianoforte (1935)
  - Meditation 'Kol Nidre' for cello and piano (1941)
  - "Figaro," from The Barber of Seville by Rossini (1943) for violoncello and piano
  - "Don Giovanni" (Serenade), from Don Giovanni by Mozart (1943) for violoncello and piano
  - "La Vallée des Cloches" from "Miroirs" by Ravel, a concert transcription for cello and piano (1944)
  - "Alborada del Gracioso," from "Miroirs" by Ravel, a concert transcription for cello and piano (1944)
- Bernard Cavanna
  - Alte Musik (2020)
- Raphaël Cendo
  - Furia (2009–2010)
- Friedrich Cerha
  - Drei Stücke (2013)
  - Fünf Sätze (2013)
- Jordi Cervelló (1935–?)
  - Sonata In Memorian Pau Casals for cello and piano (10 min) (1976)
  - Un Cant a Pau Casals for cello and piano (1991)
- George Chadwick
  - Romanza (1883)
  - Easter Morn (1914)
- Cécile Chaminade
  - Romanza for cello and piano Op. 31a (unpublished)
  - La Chaise à Porteurs for cello and piano Op. 55b (Enoch) 1896
  - Sommeil d'Enfant for cello and piano )p. 125 (Enoch) 1907
- Yves Chauris
  - D’arbres, de ténèbres, de terre (2016)
- Daniel Chazanoff
  - Leaves of a Hebrew Calendar for Cello and Piano (Allentoff Music)
- Frédéric Chopin
  - Introduction et polonaise brillante, Op.3
  - Cello sonata, Op. 65 in G minor (1845)
  - Grand Duo concertant, E major, B. 70 (1832) (together with Auguste Franchomme)
- Francesco Cilea
  - Cello sonata, Op. 38 in D (1888)
- Rebecca Clarke
  - Sonata (1919)
  - Epilogue (1921)
  - Rhapsody for Cello and Piano (1923)
- Samuel Coleridge-Taylor
  - Variations for Cello and Piano
- Jérôme Combier
  - Freezing Fields (2017) for Cello and Piano
- David Conte
  - Sonata for Violoncello and Piano (2015) (written for cellist Emil Miland)
- Marius Constant
  - Trois portraits pour violoncelle et piano (1958)
- Aaron Copland
  - Waltz and Celebration
- John Corigliano
  - Phantasmagoria (1993)
- Henry Cowell
  - Cello sonata
  - Hymn and Fuguing Tune No. 9 for cello & piano, HC 758
  - Four declamations with return (1949)
- Jean Cras
  - "La Chair", Cello Sonata (1901)
  - Largo (1903)
  - Légende (1930)
- César Cui
  - Scherzando, Op. 36 No. 1 (1886)
  - Cantabile, Op. 36 No. 2 (1886)
  - Barcarolle, Op. 81 (1910)

== D ==
- Peter Maxwell Davies
  - Sonata for ‘Cello & Piano (2007) "Sequentia Serpentigena"
- Gualtiero Dazzi
  - Petite suite de voyage (1997)
- Claude Debussy
  - Intermezzo
  - Scherzo
  - Cello Sonata (1915)
- Thomas de Hartmann
  - Sonate for Cello and Piano Op. 63 (1941)
  - Two Preludes od J.S. Bach (1947)
- Frederick Delius
  - Romance (1896)
  - Cello sonata (1916)
  - Caprice and Elegy (1930)
- Norman Dello Joio
  - Duo Concertato (1949)
- Edison Denisov
  - Suite for cello and piano (1961)
  - Three Pieces for cello and piano, Op. 26 (1967)
  - Sonata for cello and piano, Op. 40 (1971)
  - Variations on a Theme of Schubert for cello and piano (1986)
- Albert Dietrich
  - Sonate in C major Op. 18, for cello and piano
  - Intermezzo for Cello and Piano, Op. 116/4
- Ernő Dohnányi
  - Cello Sonata in B♭ minor, Op. 8 (1899)
  - Ruralia Hungarica Op.32d
- Franco Donatoni
  - Sincronie
- Felix Draeseke
  - Cello sonata, Op. 51 in D (1890)
- Marcel Dupré
  - Sonata for Cello and Organ A minor (1964)
- Pascal Dusapin
  - Slackline for Cello and Piano (2015)
- Antonín Dvořák
  - Polonaise in A major, B.94 (1879)
  - Rondo in G minor, Op. 94, B.171 (1891)
  - Slavonic Dances, Op. 46, B.172 (1891)
    - No.3 in A major, Polka : Allegretto
    - No.8 in G minor, Furiant : Vivace
  - Silent Woods, Op. 68.5, B.173 (1891)

== E ==
- Moritz Eggert
  - Fast Forward (for Cello and Piano, 1999)
  - Continuum (for Cello and Piano, 2000)
  - La Risposta (2002)
- Brian Elias
  - L’innominata (2018)
- Jose Elizondo
  - Danzas Latinoamericanas (Latin American Dances) (1997)
  - Otoño en Buenos Aires (Autumn in Buenos Aires) (1997)
  - Pan de Azúcar (Sugar Loaf mountain) (1997)
  - Atardecer Tapatío (Sunset in Guadalajara) (1997)
  - La alborada de la esperanza (The Dawn of Hope) (2018)
  - Limoncello (2018)
  - Crepúsculos (Twilights) (2018)
  - Princesa de hadas (Fairy Tale Princess) (1995)
- George Enescu
  - Nocturne et Saltarello
  - Cello sonata, Op. 26, No. 1 in F minor (1898)
  - Cello sonata, Op. 26, No. 2 in C major (1935)
- Einar Englund
  - Cello sonata (1982) ()
- Iván Erőd
  - "Köszönet Bartóknak" (Thanks to Bartók) Op.81 (2006) (3 min)
- Thierry Escaich
  - Nocturne (1997)
- Andrei Yakovlevich Eshpai
  - Sonata for cello and piano (1990) (25 min)

== F ==
- Sebastian Fagerlund
  - Silent Words, (2013)
- Ferenc Farkas
  - Alla danza ungherese No. 2 (1934)
  - Sonata (1932)
  - Folksong Sonatina (1955)
  - All’antica (1962)
  - Ballada (1963)
  - Quattro pezzi (1965)
- Louise Farrenc
  - Cello sonata, Op. 46 in B♭ (published 1861)
- Gabriel Fauré
  - Petite Pièce in G major Op. 49 (LOST) (1888)
  - Élégie, Op. 24 (1883)
  - Romance in A major, Op. 69 (1894)
  - Papillon, Op. 77 (1894)
  - Sicilienne, Op. 78 (1898)
  - Sérénade, Op. 98 (1908)
  - Cello Sonata No. 1 Op. 109 in D minor (1917)
  - Cello Sonata No. 2 Op. 117 in G minor (1921)
- Jindřich Feld
  - Three pieces for cello and piano (1954–55)
  - Sonata for cello and piano (1972)
- Morton Feldman
  - Two pieces
  - Cello Sonatina
  - Durations No.2
  - Composition for Cello and Piano
  - For Stockhausen, Cage, Stravinsky and Mary Sprinson
  - Patterns on a Chromatic Field
- Richard Festinger
  - Sonata for Cello and Piano (1990)
- Vivian Fine
  - Fantasy for cello and piano (1962)
  - Sonata for cello and piano (1982)
- Michael Finnissy
  - Chi Mei Ricercari (2015)
- Graciane Finzi
  - Game dans la nuit (!988)
  - Impression Tango (2003)
- Alissa Firsova
  - Fantasy Op.29
- Elena Firsova
  - Sonata Op.5
  - You and I Op.55
  - The Enchanted Island Op.66
  - Homage to Canisy, Op.129
- Lukas Foss
  - Intermezzo for cello and piano (1940)
  - Duo (Fantasia) for cello and piano (1941)
  - Capriccio for cello and piano (1948)
- John Foulds
  - Cello Sonata, Op. 6 (around 1905, revised 1927)
- Jean Françaix
  - Sérénade (1934)
  - Mouvement perpétuel (1944)
  - Nocturne (1951)
  - Berceuse (1953)
  - Rondino staccato (1953)
  - Fantaisie (1962)
- César Franck
  - Violin Sonata in A major, arranged for cello and piano by Jules Delsart and approved by the composer
- Eduard Franck
  - Cello Sonate, No.1 in D major, Op. 6 (1846)
  - Cello Sonata, No.2 in F major, Op. 42 (1882)
- Richard Franck
  - Cello Sonata, No.1 in D major, Op. 22 (1894)
  - Cello Sonata, No.2 in E♭ major, Op. 36 (1903)
  - Serenade for cello in C major, Op. 24 (1896)
- Gabriela Lena Frank
  - Rios Profundos
  - Adagio para Amantaní
- Luís de Freitas Branco
  - Sonata (1913)
- Peter Fribbins
  - Sonata for 'Cello and Piano (2004 - 2005)
  - "...that which echoes in eternity" (2002 - 2003). Also version for violin and piano
- Joel Phillip Friedman
  - Pas de Deux (1994, Rev. 2001)
- Robert Fuchs
  - Cello sonata, Op. 29 in D minor
  - Cello sonata, Op. 83 in E♭ minor
  - 7 fantasieën Op. 78
- Sandro Fuga
  - 3 Sonatas for cello and piano (1936, 1973 e 1989)
- Dai Fujikura
  - Distorting rage (2000)
  - Flicker (2011)

== G ==
- Domenico Gabrielli
  - Two sonatas for cello and basso continuo
- Magí Garcías
  - Crui II: Santa Catalina
- Zoltán Gárdonyi
  - Sonata for cello and piano (1944)
- Valeri Gavrilin
  - Kholeovliya for cello and piano (2003)
- Jiří Gemrot
  - Sonata for cello and piano (published 2003 by Český rozhlas
- Roberto Gerhard
  - Cello Sonata (1956 originally for viola and piano (1948), transcription by the composer for cello and piano)
- Friedrich Gernsheim
  - Cello Sonata No. 1 Op. 12 in D minor
  - Cello Sonata No. 2 Op. 79 in E minor
  - Cello Sonata No. 3 Op. 87 in E minor
- Ruth Gibbs
  - Cello Sonata, Op. 63 (1978)
- Alberto Ginastera
  - Cello Sonata Op. 49 (1979)
  - Pampeana No. 2 for cello and piano, Op. 21
- Detlev Glanert
  - Serenade Op.13 (1986)
- Alexander Glazunov
  - Arabic Melody for cello and piano, Op. 4 No. 5; from Five Romances (songs) (1882–85)
  - Elegy in D♭ major for cello and piano (Une Pensee a F. Liszt), Op. 17 (1888)
  - Two Pieces for cello and piano, Op. 20A (1888) (Melodie; Spanish Serenade)
  - Chant du Ménestrel for cello and piano, Op. 71 (1900)
- Reinhold Glière
  - Ballade
  - 12 Album Leaves for cello and piano, Op. 51 (1910)
- Vladimír Godár
  - Sonata in memory of Viktor Shklovsky for cello and piano (1985)
  - Emmeleia for cello and piano (1994)
- Alexander Goehr
  - Sonata (1984)
  - Fantasie (2005)
- Karl Goldmark
  - Cello sonata, Op. 39 in F (1890)
  - Evgeny Golubev
- Cello sonata Op. 60 (1972)
- Paul Graener
  - Suite, Op. 66 (1924)
- Percy Grainger
  - The Maiden and the Frog
  - The Sussex Mummers’ Christmas Carol
- Enrique Granados
  - Madrigal (1915) for Cello and Piano
  - Trova for cello and piano
  - Andaluza for cello and piano
  - Intermezzo (arr. by Cassado)
- Olivier Greif
  - Deux Pièces pour violoncelle et piano - 1
  - Deux Pièces pour violoncelle et piano - 2
  - En rêve pour violoncelle et piano
  - Oi Akashe pour violoncelle et piano
  - Shylock funèbre pour piano et violoncelle
  - Sonate de Requiem pour violoncelle et piano
  - Sonate de Requiem pour violoncelle et piano
  - Veni Creator pour violoncelle et piano
- Mark Gresham
  - Sonata for Violoncello and Piano (1993)
- Edvard Grieg
  - Cello sonata, Op. 36 in A minor (1883)
- Jorge Grundman
  - Sonata for Cello and Piano. Those Who Couldn't Wave Goodbye (2020)
- Friedrich Grützmacher (1832–1903)
  - Hungarian Fantasy for Violoncello and Piano, Op. 7

== H ==
- Alois Hába
  - Fantasy for cello & quarter-tone piano Op. 33, (1927)
- Kimmo Hakola
  - ...La nuit n'est pas
  - Consolation (2004)
  - Appassionato Op. 76 (2009)
- Ernesto Halffter
  - Fantasie Espagnole (1952)
- Lou Harrison
  - Suite pour violoncelle et piano (1995)
- Jonathan Harvey
  - Dialogue and Song (1977)
- Paavo Heininen
  - Deux Chansons
  - Sonata for Violoncello and Piano — Bassosonaatti/Sonata Basso
  - Elegie X - Mourning bells (2019)
- Fanny Hensel
  - Fantasia G minor
  - Capriccio A Major (H247)
- Swan Hennessy
  - Rapsodie gaélique, Op. 63 (1925), Paris: Max Eschig & Cie.
  - Pièce celtique, Op. 74 (1928), Paris: Éditions Max Eschig
  - Sonatine, Op. 81 (1929), Paris: Propriété de l'auteur
- Philippr Hersant
  - Dreaming Tracks (2013)
- Heinrich von Herzogenberg
  - Cello Sonata, No.1 in a minor, Op. 52 (1886)
  - Cello Sonata, No.2, Op. 64 (1889)
  - Cello Sonata, No.3, Op. 94 (1895)
- Kenneth Hesketh
  - Cantilena
- Kurt Hessenberg
  - Sonata, Op. 23 (1941)
- Jennifer Higdon
  - Nocturne
- Anders Hillborg
  - Duo (2013)
- John S. Hilliard
  - Cello sonata
- Paul Hindemith
  - 3 pieces Op.8 (1917)
  - Sonata Op. 11, No. 3 (1919)
  - Drei leichte Stücke for Cello and Piano (1938)
  - Variations on "A Frog He Went a Courting" for Cello and Piano (1941)
  - Kleine Sonata (1942)
  - Sonata (1948)
- Alistair Hinton
  - Cello sonata, Op. 39 (1999)
- Heinz Holliger
  - Romancendres (2003)
- York Höller
  - Pas de deux (1993)
- Arthur Honegger
  - Cello sonata, H32 (à René Gosselin) (1920)
  - Sonatina (1921)
- Luc Van Hove
  - Sonata for cello and piano Op.27
- Toshio Hosokawa
  - Lied III
- Hans Huber
  - Cello Sonata, No.1 in D major, Op. 33 (1878)
  - Cello Sonata, No.2 "Pastoral Sonate" in A major, Op. 84
  - Suite in d minor, Op. 89 (1886)
  - Cello Sonata, No.3 in C♯ minor, Op. 114 (1900)
  - Cello Sonata, No.4
  - Romance for Cello and Piano
- Klaus Huber
  - Lazarus I/II (1978)
- Bertold Hummel
  - Sonata in F, Op. 2 (1950)
  - Sonata brevis, Op. 11a (1955)
  - Little Suite, Op. 19a (1956)
  - Sonatina N°1, Op. 35c (1969)
  - Sonatina N°2, Op. 52a (1973)
- Johann Nepomuk Hummel
  - Cello sonata, Op. 104 in A (1824) ()
  - Potpourri for Cello and Piano Op.86
- Jean Huré
  - Sonata No. 1 in F♯ minor for cello and piano (1903; Paris: A. Z. Mathot, 1914)
  - Sonata No. 2 in F major for cello and piano (1906)
  - Sonata No. 3 in F♯ major for cello and piano (1909)
- William Hurlstone
  - Cello sonata in D ()

== I ==
- Vincent d'Indy
  - Cello sonata, Op. 84 in D (1924–25)
- John Ireland
  - Cello sonata in G minor (1923)
- Yoshirō Irino
  - Sonata for Cello and Piano (1945)
- Yuri Ishchenko
  - Adagietto and Scherzino for cello and piano

== J ==
- Emile Jaques-Dalcroze
  - Suite for Cello & Piano, Op. 9
  - 3 Morceaux, Op. 48
  - Rythmes délaissés
  - 3 Esquisses for Cello & Piano
- Marie Jaëll
  - Cello Sonata in A minor (1881, rev. 1886)
- Leoš Janáček
  - Pohádka or Fairy Tale (1910, rev. 1923)
  - Presto
- Daan Janssens
  - Wie aus der Ferne, for cello & piano (2022)
- Betsy Jolas
  - Mon Ami (1974)
  - Petites musiques de chevet (1989)
  - Quatre pièces en marge (1983)
  - Femme le soir (2018) for Cello and Piano
- André Jolivet
  - Nocturne (1943)
- Joseph Jongen
  - Cello sonata, Op. 39 (1912)
- Paul Juon
  - Cello sonata, Op. 54 in A minor (1913)

== K ==
- Dmitri Kabalevsky
  - Cello sonata, Op. 71 in B♭ (1962)
- Robert Kahn
  - Three Pieces, Op. 25 (1897)
  - Cello Sonata 1, Op. 37 (1903)
  - Cello Sonata 2, Op. 56 (1911)
- Jouni Kaipainen
  - Trois morceaux de l'aube (1980)
  - Elegia (1983)
- Vitezslava Kapralova
  - Deux ritournelles pour violoncelle et piano, Op. 25 (1940)
- Nikolai Kapustin
  - Sonata No. 1, Op. 63
  - Sonata No. 2, Op. 84
  - Elegy, Op. 96
  - Burlesque, Op. 97
  - Nearly Waltz, Op. 98
- Louis Karchin
  - Sonata for Violoncello and Piano (1990)
- Leokadiya Kashperova
  - 2 Sonatas Op.1
- Minna Keal
  - Ballade in F minor (1929)
- Karen Khachaturian
  - Sonata for cello and piano
- Tikhon Khrennikov
  - Cello sonata, Op. 34 (1989)
- Friedrich Kiel
  - Cello sonata in A minor, Op. 52 (1868)
- Zoltán Kodály
  - Cello sonata, Op. 4 (1909–10)
  - Dances of Galanta for cello and piano (arr. Varga)
  - Three chorale preludes on
    - "Ach was ist doch unser Leben"
    - "Vater unser im Himmelreich"
    - "Christus der uns selig macht"
  - Prelude and fugue for cello and piano (Bach, tr. Kodály)
  - Sonatina for cello and piano
  - Adagio for cello and piano
  - Hungarian rondo for cello and piano
- Charles Koechlin
  - Cello sonata, Op. 66 (1917)
  - Chansons bretonnes Op.115
- Ernst Krenek
  - Phantasiestück Op. 135 (1953)
- Hans Kronold
  - Five Pieces for Cello and Piano, Op. 57
  - Five Pieces for Cello and Piano, Op. 58
- Ivan Krzhanovsky
  - Cello Sonata Op.2 (1901)
  - Deux pièces pour violoncelle et piano, Op. 3
- Pablo Kunik
  - "Bruma" Opus 9 for Cello and Piano (2022)
- Larysa Kuzmenko
  - Sonata for Cello and Piano, “A Dream Within A Dream” (1992)

== L ==
- László Lajtha
  - Cello sonata
- Simon Laks
  - Cello Sonata (1932)
  - Passacaille (Vocalise) (1946)
  - Trois pièces de concert (1933/1935)
- Édouard Lalo
  - Cello sonata in A minor (to Anton Rubinstein), 1856
  - Allegro in E♭, Op. 16 (to Léon Jacquard)
- David Lang
  - undanceable (2010)
- Salvatore Lanzetti
  - More than 24 cello sonatas with basso continuo
- Thomas Larcher
  - Mumien (2002)
  - ”Splinters” Sonata (2012)
- Vadim Larchikov
  - Sonata for cello and piano (1992)
- Mario Lavista
  - Quotations
  - Tres danzas seculares
- Ramon Lazkano
  - Wintersonnenwende-2 (2007)
- Luise Adolpha Le Beau
  - Sonate Op. 17 (1883)
- René Leibowitz
  - Duo for cello and piano Op.23 (1951)
- Kenneth Leighton
  - Elegy for 'cello and piano, Op. 5 (1950)
  - Partita for 'cello and piano, Op. 35 (1959)
  - Alleluia Pascha Nostrum for 'cello and piano, Op. 85 (1981)
- Helvi Leiviskä
  - Cantabile (1937)
- Guillaume Lekeu
  - Cello sonata in F (finished by Vincent d'Indy)
- Ruggero Leoncavallo
  - Serenade
- Fred Lerdahl
  - Duo (2017)
- Peter Lieberson
  - Three Variations
  - Remembering Schumann
- Hélène Liebmann
  - Grande Sonate Op.11 (1813)
- Magnus Lindberg
  - Moto (1990)
  - Dos Coyotes (2002)
  - Santa Fe Project (2006)
- Franz Liszt
  - Élégie No. 1 [first/second/third version] S.130 (1874)
  - Élégie No. 2 S.131 (1877)
  - Romance oubliée S.132 (1880)
  - La lugubre gondola S.134, [first/second version] (1883?, 1885?)
- Vasily Lobanov
  - Sonata No.1 for cello and piano Op. 14 (1971)
  - 7 pieces for cello and piano Op. 25 (1978)
  - Sonata No.2 for cello and piano Op. 54 (1989)
- Pietro Antonio Locatelli
  - Cello sonata in D major
- Alvin Lucier
  - Twonings (2006)
- Witold Lutoslawski
  - Grave
- Elisabeth Lutyens
  - Nine Bagatelles
- Mykola Lysenko
  - La Tristesse (Sorrow)
- Ilya Lyzohub
  - Sonata

== M ==
- James MacMillan
  - Cello Sonata No. 1
  - Cello Sonata No. 2 (15 min) (2000)
- Ivo Malec
  - Sonata brevis (1956)
- Robert Mann
  - Duo for cello and piano
- Bruno Mantovani
  - Cinq pièces pour Paul Klee (2007)
- Elizabeth Maconchy
  - Divertimento
  - Contemplation (1978)
- Leevi Madetoja
  - Suite Lyrique
- Michio Mamiya
  - Cello Sonata
  - 5 Finnish Folk Songs (1977)
  - 6 Japanese Folk Songs (1972)
- Juan Manén
  - Sonata di concerto for cello and piano Op. A-42 (1947)
- Albéric Magnard
  - Cello sonata, Op. 20 in A (1911)
- Benedetto Marcello
  - 12 sonatas (1730s)
- Andrew March
  - Ephemeral Nymphs, for Cello and Piano (2015) ()
- Frank Martin
  - Chaconne for Cello and Piano (1931)
  - Ballade for Cello and Piano (1949)
- Bohuslav Martinů
  - Cello sonata, No. 1 (1939)
  - Cello sonata, No. 2 (1941)
  - Cello sonata, No. 3 (1952)
  - Variations sur un thème Slovaque, H.378
  - Variations on a Theme of Rossini, H.290
  - Ariette, H 188B (1930 Paris)
  - Nocturnes, H 189 (1931 Paris)
  - Pastorals, H 190 (1931 Paris)
  - Miniature Suite, H 192 (1931 Paris)
  - 7 Arabesques, H. 201
- Zoe Martlew
  - Berceuse
- Giuseppe Martucci
  - Cello Sonata Op. 52 in F♯ minor (1880)
  - 3 Pieces for Cello and Piano, Op. 69 (1888)
  - 2 Romances for Cello and Piano, Op. 72 (1890)
- Joseph Marx
  - Pastorale (1914)
  - Suite (1914)
- Colin Matthews
  - Three Enigmas
  - Five Duos
- Emilie Mayer
  - 11 Sonatas for cello and piano
- Aarre Merikanto
  - Andante elegiaco and Canzonetta (1933)
- Usko Meriläinen
  - Meditation
  - Paripeli
- Felix Mendelssohn
  - Cello sonata No. 1, Op. 45 in B♭ major (1838)
  - Cello sonata No. 2, Op. 58 in D major (1842–43) ()
  - Variations concertantes, Op. 17
  - Song Without Words in D major, Op. 109
  - Andante Cantabile from "Sonata No. 3" for Organ (Calamosca)
- Krzysztof Meyer
  - Canzona per violoncello e pianoforte, Op. 56 (1981)
  - Sonata per violoncello e pianoforte No.1, Op. 62 (1983)
  - Sonata per violoncello e pianoforte No.2, Op. 99 (2004)
- Marcel Mihalovici
  - Sonata in the character of a lyrical scene, Op. 108
- András Mihály
  - Mouvement for Cello and Piano (1962)
- Darius Milhaud
  - Élégie for cello and piano, Op. 251 (1945)
  - Sonata for cello and piano, Op. 377 (1959)
- Eric Moe (1954–?)
  - Variations (1985) for cello and piano
  - Mud Wrestling at the O.K. Corral (2007) for cello and piano
- Ernest John Moeran
  - Cello sonata in A minor (1947)
- Eric Montalbetti
  - 3 Impromptus
- Ignaz Moscheles
  - Grande sonate concertante, Op.34 (1814)
  - Cello Sonata, Op.121 (1850)
  - Melodic-Contrapuntal Studies, Op. 137 (After Bach's The Well Tempered Clavier)
- Alexander Mosolov
  - Elegy for cello and piano, Op.2
  - Legend for cello and piano, Op.5 (1924)
  - Sonata for cello and piano (1927)
- Wolfgang Amadeus Mozart
  - Sonata in G major, K379 for Cello and Piano, transcribed by Alexander Kniazev
  - Sonata in G major, K301 for Cello and Piano, transcribed by Alexander Kniazev
  - Sonata in F major, K376 for Cello and Piano, transcribed by Alexander Kniazev
  - Sonata-Rondo from Mozarts Fragment KV Anh. 46 (374g) for cello and piano 1782 (completed by John Hilliard)
- Franz Xaver Wolfgang Mozart
  - Sonata for violoncello and piano in E major, Op. 19 (published in 1820)
- Nikolai Myaskovsky
  - Cello sonata, Op. 12 in D (1911)
  - Cello sonata, Op. 81 in A minor (1948–49)

== N ==
- Nicolas Nabokov
  - Prelude, Four Variations and Finale
- Luis Naon
  - Tango del desamparo (1987)
- Lior Navok
  - Fluctuations (2017)
- Marc Neikrug
  - Petrus (2001)
- Fabio Nieder
  - Zwei frühe Stücke (1975)
- Ichiro Nodaïra
  - Deux images (1997)
  - Texture du délire IV (2004)
- Per Nørgård
  - Sonate for cello og klaver - i fire satser (1952)
  - Cantica (1977)
- Andrew Norman
  - Sonnets
- Ludvig Norman
  - Cello Sonata in D major, Op. 28
- Jan Novák
  - Rotundelli for cello and piano, 1981
- Vítězslav Novák
  - Cello sonata, Op. 66 in G minor

== O ==
- Maurice Ohana
  - Noctuaire
  - Syrtes
- Samir Odeh-Tamimi
  - Jabsurr (2009)
- Georg Onslow
  - Cello Sonata, Op.16 No.1
  - Cello Sonata, Op.16 No.2
  - Cello Sonata, Op.16 No.3
- Peter van Onna
  - Geographies: Kyoto Anmintaku, for Cello and Piano
- Leo Ornstein
  - Six Preludes
  - Two pieces Op. 33
  - Cello Sonata No.1, Op. 52 (1918)
  - Cello Sonata No.2 (1920)
  - Composition I
- Charles Wilfred Orr
  - Carmen Fantasy for cello and piano
- Pablo Ortiz
  - Mid-century (2019)

== P ==
- Paul Paray
  - Cello Sonata (1921)
- Hubert Parry
  - Cello sonata in A (1879) ()
- Thierry Pécou
  - Traversée du rêve (1988)
  - Suite aquatique (1994)
  - Soleil-Tigre
- Dora Pejačević
  - Sonata for Cello and Piano in E minor Op. 35 (1913)
- George Perle
  - Lyric Piece (1946)
  - Sonata (1985)
- Vincent Persichetti
  - Vocalise, Op.27 (1945)
- Goffredo Petrassi
  - Preludio, Aria, e Finale for Cello & Piano (1933)
- Wayne Peterson
  - Rhapsody for Cello and Piano (1976)
- Hans Pfitzner
  - Cello sonata, Op. 1 in F♯ minor
- Carlo Alfredo Piatti
  - Air Baskyrs, Op. 8
  - Am Meer, Serenade, Ave Maria (Franz Schubert / Alfredo Piatti)
  - Canto di primavera for cello and piano
  - Canzonetta for cello and piano
  - Danza moresca for cello and piano
  - Elegia per la morte di Cavour for cello and piano
  - Entreaty / Supplication / Bitte for cello and piano
  - Follia su un’aria di Geminiani for cello and piano
  - Gagliarda for cello and piano
  - Impromptu sopra un’aria di Purcell nella “Regina Indiana for cello and piano
  - Introduction and Variations on a theme from Donizetti's Lucia di Lammermoor, Op. 2 for cello and piano
  - Introduzione e Allegro alla Spagnuola for cello and piano
  - La Bergamasca, Op. 14 for cello and piano
  - Gita in gondola / La Danza for cello and piano
  - Les Fiancés, Op. 7 for cello and piano
  - Mazurka Sentimentale, Op. 6 for cello and piano
  - Notturno, Op. 20 for cello and piano
  - Ossian's song, Ballad for cello and piano
  - Passetemps Sentimental, Op. 4
  - Pioggia d’Aprile for cello and piano
  - Sérénade Italienne, Op. 17 for cello and piano
  - Siciliana, Op. 19 for cello and piano
  - Souvenir de la Sonnambula, Op. 5 for cello and piano
  - Tarantella, Op. 23 for cello and piano
  - Tema e Variazioni for cello and piano
  - The race – La corsa for cello and piano
  - Twenty-One Hungarian Dances (1881, Brahms-Piatti)
- Ástor Piazzolla
  - Tres piezas Breves
  - Le Grand Tango for cello and piano
- Gabriel Pierné
  - Cello sonata, Op. 46 in F♯ minor (1919)
- Willem Pijper
  - Cello sonata, No. 1 (1919)
  - Cello sonata, No. 2 (1924) ()
- Matthias Pintscher
  - Uriel (2011–2012)
- Walter Piston
  - Duo for Cello and Piano (1972)
- Ildebrando Pizzetti
  - Cello sonata in F (1921)
  - Tre Canti per violoncello e piano
- Manuel Ponce
  - Sonata for cello and piano (1922)
- Miroslav Ponc
  - Five short pieces Op. 9 (1927)
- Enno Poppe
  - Schweiss (2010)
- David Popper
  - Op. 3, Scenes From a Masked Ball, cello and piano
  - Op. 5, Romance, cello and piano
  - Op. 10, Pieces for cello and piano
  - Op. 11, Pieces for cello and piano
  - Op. 12, Mazurka in D minor, cello and piano
  - Op. 14, Polonaise de concert, cello and piano
  - Op. 18, Sérénade orientale, cello and piano
  - Op. 22, Nocturne in G major, cello and piano
  - Op. 23, Pieces for cello and piano
  - Op. 28, Concert-Polonaise No. 2 in F major, cello and piano
  - Op. 32, Pieces for cello and piano
  - Op. 33, Tarantella, cello and piano
  - Op. 35, Four Mazurkas, cello and piano
  - Op. 38, Barcarolle in G major, cello and piano
  - Op. 39, Dance of the Elves, cello and piano
  - Op. 41, Nocturne, cello and piano
  - Op. 42, Three Nocturnes, cello and piano
  - Op. 43, Fantasy on Little Russian Songs, cello and piano
  - Op. 46, 2 Transcriptions for Cello and Piano
  - Op. 47, Nocturne No.4 in B Minor for cello and piano
  - Op. 48, Menuetto in D major, cello and piano
  - Op. 51, Six Mazurkas, cello and piano
  - Op. 54, Spanish Dances, cello and piano
  - Op. 55, Pieces for cello and piano
  - Op. 60, Walzer Suite, cello and piano
  - Op. 62, Pieces for cello and piano
  - Op. 64, Pieces for cello and piano
  - Op. 65, Pieces for cello and piano
  - Op. 67, Pieces for cello and piano
  - Op. 68, Hungarian Rhapsody, cello and piano
  - Op. 69, Suite for cello and piano
  - Op. 71, Scottish Fantasy, cello and piano
  - Op. 75, Serenade, cello and piano
  - Op. 81, Gavotte in A Major for Cello and Piano
- Alberto Posadas
  - Proemio (2011)
- Francis Poulenc
  - Cello sonata (1948)
- Henri Pousseur
  - Petit Mausolee ambulant (2005)
- Nikolai Potolovsky
  - Cello Sonata Op.2 (1905)
- Gerhard Präsent
  - Sonata al dente for cello and piano Op.23 (1988–90) ()
- Sergei Prokofiev
  - Ballade for Cello and Piano Op 15 (1912)
  - Cello sonata, Op. 119 (1949)
- Marta Ptaszynska
- Kwiat Ksiezyca / Moon Flowers

== R ==
- Sergei Rachmaninoff
  - Cello Sonata in G minor, Op. 19 (1901)
- Horatiu Radulescu
  - L'exil Intérieur 1997
- Joachim Raff
  - Cello Sonata in D, Op. 183 (1873)
- Einojuhani Rautavaara
  - 2 Preludes & Fugues (1955)
  - Music for Upright Piano and Amplified Cello (1977)
  - Sonata for Cello and Piano (1974/1991)
  - Cello Sonata No. 2
  - Polska (Polka)
  - Sydämeni laulu / Song of My Heart (2000)
- Matti Rautio
  - Divertimento 1
  - Divertimento 2
- Max Reger
  - Cello sonata, Op. 5 in F minor (1892)
  - Cello sonata, Op. 28 in G minor (1898?)
  - Cello sonata, Op. 78 in F (1904)
  - Cello sonata, Op. 116 in A minor (1910?)
  - Two pieces for cello and piano, Op. 79e (1904)
- Aribert Reimann
  - Cello Sonata (1965)
- Carl Reinecke
  - Cello sonata, Op. 42 in A minor (1847/8)
  - Cello sonata, Op. 89 in D (1866)
  - Drei stücke, Op. 146 (1878)
  - Cello sonata, Op. 238 in G
- Henriette Renié
  - Sonate pour piano et violoncelle
- Roger Reynolds
  - A Crimson Path (2000)
- Josef Rheinberger
  - Cello sonata, Op. 92 in C
- Ferdinand Ries
  - Cello sonata, WoO. 2 in C minor
  - Cello sonata, Op. 20 in C
  - Cello sonata, Op. 21 in A
  - Cello sonata, Op. 125 in G minor
- Wolfgang Rihm
  - Von weit (1993)
  - 2 Stücke (2022)
- Yann Robin
  - Con Fuoco (2011)
- George Rochberg
  - Ricordanza (Soliloquy),(1972)
- Lucia Ronchetti
  - Ravel Unravel for cello and piano, (2012)
  - Sites auriculaires, for cello and piano, (2012)
- Julius Röntgen
  - Cello Sonata No. 1 in B♭, Op. 3 (1872–73)
  - Cello Sonata No. 2 in A minor, Op. 41 (1900)
  - Cello Sonata No. 3 in G minor (1905)
  - Cello Sonata No. 4 in C minor (1906)
  - Cello Sonata No. 5 in B minor, Op. 56 (1907–10)
  - Cello Sonata No. 6 in D (1914–15)
  - Cello Sonata No. 7 in F♯ minor (1917)
  - Cello Sonata No. 8 in D minor (1926)
  - Cello Sonata No. 9 in E minor (1927)
  - Cello Sonata No. 10 in C minor (1927)
  - Cello Sonata No. 11 in D minor (1930)
  - Cello Sonata No. 12 in A minor (1930)
  - Cello Sonata No. 13 in C♯ minor (1931)
  - Cello Sonata No. 14 in C major (1931)
  - and many variation sets and other works (source )
- Joseph Guy Ropartz
  - Cello sonata, Op. 119 in G minor
  - Cello sonata in A minor
- Nikolai Roslavets
  - Dance of the White Girls (1912)
  - Meditation (1921)
  - Sonata No. 1 (1921) — published 1924
  - Sonata No. 2 (1921–1922)
- Miklós Rózsa
  - Duo, Op. 8 (about 1931)
- Ludomir Różycki
  - Cello Sonata Op. 10
  - Nocturne op 30/2
- Edmund Rubbra
  - Cello sonata, Op. 60 in G minor (1946)
- Anton Rubinstein
  - Cello sonata, Op. 18 in D (1852)
  - Cello sonata, Op. 39 in G (1857)
- Joseph Ryelandt
  - Cello Sonata No. 1, Op. 22 (1898)
  - Cello Sonata No. 2, Op. 66 (1917)
  - Cello Sonata No. 3, Op. 132 (1944)

== S ==
- Kaija Saariaho
  - Im Traume (1980)
- Camille Saint-Saëns
  - Suite for Cello and Piano, Op. 16 (1866)
  - Cello sonata, Op. 32 in C minor (1872–73)
  - Allegro Appassionato Op.43
  - Romance Op.67
  - Chant Saphique Op.91
  - Cello sonata, Op. 123 in F (1905)
  - Priére Op.158
  - Gavotte Op. posth.
- Aulis Sallinen
  - Metamorfora (1974)
  - Cello Sonata Op.86 (2004)
  - Baumgesang mit Epilog
- Timothy Salter
  - Cantus for cello and piano (1975)
- Georgina Sánchez Torres
  - Elegía Rapsódica
  - En la Holgura de la abstrusa noche
  - Hirundo Rustica
  - La Ciudad del Cielo
  - El Sollozar del Guerrero
  - Cuando los rescoldos se volvieron llamas
  - El Eslabón del afecto eterno
- Ahmet Adnan Saygun
  - Sonata Op.12 (1935)
- Giacinto Scelsi
  - Dialogo for cello and piano (1932)
  - Ballata for cello and piano (1943)
  - To the master "Two improvisations" for cello and piano (1974)
- Philipp Scharwenka
  - Cello Sonata in G minor (Op. 116)
- Asbjørn Schaathun
  - Stilleben (1976 -1978)
- Xaver Scharwenka
  - Cello Sonata in E minor (Op. 46) (1877) (score available at IMSLP)
- Rodion Shchedrin
  - Quadrille (from opera Not Love Alone)
  - Sonata (1996)
  - Ancient Melodies of Russian Folk Songs (2007)
- Alexander Shchetynsky
  - Antiphons for Cello and Piano (1983)
  - Message from A.W. for Cello and Piano (1996)
  - Sonata for Cello and Piano (2006)
- Franz Schmidt
  - Drei Kleine Fantasiestücke (1892)
- Alfred Schnittke
  - Cello Sonata No. 1 (1978)
  - Musica nostalgica for cello and piano (1992)
  - Peer Gynt: Epiloque for cello, piano and tape (1993)
  - Cello Sonata No. 2 (1993–94)
- Ruth Schonthal
  - Sonata concertante: for cello, viola or clarinet and piano (1973)
- Franz Schubert
  - Sonata for the Arpeggione D.821 in A minor
  - Fantasy in F minor, D.940, orig. piano four-hands (Varga)
- Robert Schumann
  - Adagio und Allegro, Op. 70 (originally for horn and piano)
  - Fantasiestücke, Op.73 (originally for clarinet and piano)
  - Fünf Stücke im Volkston (Five Pieces in Folk Style), Op.102
- Camillo Schumann
  - Cellosonate Nr. 1 Op. 59
  - Cellosonate Nr. 2 Op. 99
  - Cellosonate Nr. 3 Op. 118a
- Erwin Schulhoff
  - Cello sonata
- Vissarion Shebalin
  - Cello sonata in C
- Salvatore Sciarrino
  - Melencolia I
- Matyas Seiber
  - Phantasy (1944)
- Nina Šenk
  - Inner Weather - Hidden thoughts (2003)
- Bright Sheng
  - Northern Lights (2009)
- Dmitri Shostakovich
  - Cello sonata, Op. 40 in D minor (1934)
- Alan Shulman
  - Lament for cello and piano (1939)
  - Serenade for cello and piano (1941)
  - 3 – 4 – J ("Three for Jay") for cello and piano (1960)
  - Suite for the Young 'Cellist for cello and piano (1961)
  - Kol Nidre for cello and piano (1970)
  - Lament II for cello and piano (1983)
- Andriy Shtoharenko
  - Sonata for cello and piano
- Jean Sibelius
  - Malinconia Op.20 (1900)
  - Cantique & Devotion Op.77 (1915)
  - Four Pieces Op. 78 (1915–17)
- Arlene Sierra
  - Counting-Out Rhyme for Cello and Piano (2002)
- Valentin Silvestrov
  - Sonata
- Hans Sitt
  - Romanze Op. 17
  - Scherzo Op.35
- Fredrik Sixten
  - Sonata for cello and piano (1986)
  - Epilogue for cello and piano (2002)
- Emil Sjögren
  - Cello sonata in A major, Op. 58 (1912)
- Nikos Skalkottas
  - Largo for cello and piano (c. 1940)
  - Sonatina for cello and piano (1949)
  - Bolero for cello and piano (1948–9)
  - Tender Melody for cello and piano (1948–9)
  - Serenata for cello and piano (1948–9)
  - Tender Melody for cello and piano (1948–9)
- Dave Smith
  - Kaivopuisto (1996)
- David Stanley Smith
  - Cello sonata, Op. 59
- Ethel Smyth
  - Cello Sonata No. 1 in C minor (1880)
  - Cello Sonata No. 2 in A minor, Op. 5 (1887)
- Eliodoro Sollima
  - Cello Sonata (1948)
- Charles Villiers Stanford
  - Cello Sonata, No. 1, Op. 9 in A major (1877)
  - Cello Sonata, No. 2, Op. 39 in D minor (1889) ( (Hyperion Records gives 1893 for their recording of the same work however.))
- Ernstalbrecht Stiebler
  - Duo '90
- Richard Stöhr
  - 4 Phantasiestücke Op.17 (1907)
  - Cello sOnata Op.49 (1915)
- Zygmunt Stojowski
  - Cello Sonata, Op. 18 in A (1894)
  - Fantaisie for Cello and Piano in E Major, Op. 27
  - Romance sans paroles in A Major for Cello and Piano
- Richard Strauss
  - Cello Sonata, Op. 6 in F (1883)
  - Romance
- Rita Strohl
  - Great Dramatic Sonata, "Titus et Bérénice" (published 1898)
- Josef Suk
  - Ballade and Serenade Op. 3
- Stjepan Šulek
  - Cello Sonata (1974)
- Piet Swerts
  - Promenade (2021)
- Witold Szalonek
  - Sonata for cello and piano (1958)

== T ==
- Alexander Taneyev
  - Bagatelle and Serenade for cello and piano, Op.10
- Alexander Tansman
  - Partita
  - Deux Pièces
  - Fantaisie
  - Sonata for cello and piano
  - Quatre Pièces Faciles
- Toru Takemitsu
  - Orion (1984)
- Otar Taktakishvili
  - Poem and Allegro for cello and piano (1969)
- Jan Tausinger
  - Suite-sonata for cello and piano (1974–75)
- Boris Tchaikovsky
  - Cello sonata in E minor (1957)
- Alexander Tcherepnin
  - Ode für Violoncello und Klavier
  - Sonata No. 1 for cello and piano Op.29 (1924).
  - Sonata No. 2 for cello and piano Op.30 No.1 (1924)
  - Sonata No. 3 for cello and piano Op.30 No.2 (1919–26)
  - Mystère Op. 37 Nr.2
  - 12 Preludes (Violoncelle bien tempéré)Op.38 (1925–26)
  - Songs and dances Op. 84 (1953)
- Mikis Theodorakis
  - East of the Aegean, Suite for cello and piano
- Augusta Read Thomas
  - Chant, for cello and piano (1991; revised 2002)
  - Cantos for Slava (2007)
  - Bebop Riddle II (2022)
- Virgil Thomson
  - Four Portraits, for cello and piano (arranged in 1942 by Luigi Silva)
- Ludwig Thuille
  - Cello Sonata in D minor, Op. 22 (1902)
- Ernst Toch
  - Cello sonata, Op. 50 (1929)
  - Variations for cello and piano (2004)
- Donald Tovey
  - Cello sonata, Op. 4 in F (before 1911)
  - Elegiac Variations for cello and piano, Op. 25 (1909)
- Joan Tower
  - Très lent (Hommage à Messiaen) (1994)
- Mark-Anthony Turnage
  - Sleep on... for cello and piano (1992)
  - Two Vocalises
- Jovanka Trbojevic
  - La Dolce Vita (2012)
  - This is my second life (2013)
- Arnold Trowell
  - Cello Sonata No.2, Op. 30 (1915)
- Sulkhan Tsintsadze
  - Five Pieces on Folk Themes for cello and piano
  - Georgian Melodies for cello and piano (1967) (26 min)
  - Twenty-Four Preludes for cello and piano (1980)
- Helena Tulve
  - To Night-Travellers, the Light (2009)

== U ==
- Galina Ustvolskaya
  - Grand Duet (1959)

== V ==
- Moisei Vainberg see Mieczysław Weinberg
- Antonio Vandini
  - Two Sonatas in F major and G major
- Giuseppe Valentini
  - Sonata in E major
- Sovet (Sergey) Afanasyevich Varelas
  - Rondo
- Ralph Vaughan Williams
  - Six Studies in English Folksong (1926)
- Sándor Veress
  - Sonatina per violoncello e pianoforte(1933)
- Matthijs Vermeulen
  - Two cello sonatas (1918, 1938)
- Gabriel Vicéns
  - La Esfera (2021)
- Louis Vierne
  - Cello sonata, Op. 27 in B minor (1910)
- Henri Vieuxtemps
  - Elegie Op. 30
  - Sonata Op. 36
- Heitor Villa-Lobos
  - Pequena Suite (1913)
  - Capriccio Op. 49 (1914)
  - Elegia (1916)
  - Cello sonata, No. 1 (score missing)
  - Cello sonata, No. 2, Op. 66, 1916 ()
  - Song of the Black Swan (1917)
  - Divagacao (1946)
  - Pequena Sonata
- Antonio Vivaldi
  - at least nine sonatas
- Claude Vivier
  - Pièce pour violoncelle et piano

== W ==
- Errollyn Wallen
  - Dervish
- Huw Watkins
  - Sonata (2000)
  - Blue Shadows Fall (2013)
- Franz Waxman
  - Carmen Fantasy based on themes from the Bizet Opera (arr. David Grigorian )
- Anton Webern
  - Two Pieces (1899)
  - Cello sonata (1913)
  - Three Little Pieces for cello and piano, Op. 11 (1914)
- Karl Weigl
  - Cello Sonata (1923)
  - Two Pieces for cello and piano (1940)
  - Menuetto for cello and piano (1948)
- Kurt Weill
  - Cello sonata
- Mieczysław Weinberg
  - Cello sonata, Op. 21 in C (1945)
  - Cello sonata, Op. 63 in G minor (1958–59)
- Leo Weiner
  - Romance for Cello and Piano Op.14 (1949)
- Felix Weingartner
  - Cello Sonata (1892)
- Judith Weir
  - Three Chorals
- Lotta Wennäkoski
  - Sydänkuu (2000)
  - Foliage for cello and piano (2017)
- Charles-Marie Widor
  - Cello sonata, Op. 80 in A (1907)
- Adrian Williams
  - Spring Requiem for cello and piano (15 min) (1993)
  - 4 Cantilenes for cello and piano
  - Images of a Mind (16 min) (1986)
- Richard Wilson
  - Motivations for cello and piano (2000)
- Ermanno Wolf-Ferrari
  - Cello Sonata, Op.30 (1945)
- Charles Wuorinen
  - Duuiensela (1962)
  - Adapting to the Times (1969)
  - Fast Fantasy (1977)
  - An Orbicle of Jasp (1999)
  - Andante Espressivo (2001)
- Ivan Wyschnegradsky
  - Méditation sur deux thèmes de la Journée de l'existence Op. 7 (1918–1919)
- Josef Wölfl

Duet Op. 31 (1805)

== X ==
- Iannis Xenakis
  - Paille in the wind

== Y ==
- Victoria Yagling
  - 4 Sonatas
  - Larghetto and Siciliana
  - Vocalise (1985)
- Chen Yi
  - Romance of Hsiao and Ch’in
- Joji Yuasa
  - Projection
  - Cosmos Haptic IV
- Du Yun
  - Hong dou-dou
- Isang Yun
  - Nore (1964)
  - Intermezzo (1988)
  - Espace I (1992)

== Z ==
- Alexander von Zemlinsky
  - 3 pieces (1891)
  - Cello sonata in A minor (1894)
- Edson Zampronha
  - Between the Thunder and the Echo (premiered 2011)
- Bernd Alois Zimmermann
  - Intercommunicazione (1967)
- John Zorn
  - Occam's Razor (2013)
- Ellen Taaffe Zwilich
  - Lament for cello and piano (2000)
- Otto Zykan
  - Cello Sonata (1958)

== See also ==
- List of solo cello pieces
- List of compositions for cello and orchestra
- List of compositions for cello and organ
- Double Concerto for Violin and Cello
- Triple Concerto for Violin Cello and Piano
- Cello sonata
- String instrument repertoire
