= 1808 in music =

This is a list of music-related events in 1808.

== Events ==
- April – Beethoven's Symphony No. 4 is publicly performed for the first time, at the Burgtheater in Vienna. It was performed privately in 1807.
- December 20 – The original Covent Garden Theatre in London is destroyed by a fire, along with most of the scenery, costumes and scripts.
- December 22 – Beethoven concert of 22 December 1808: Ludwig van Beethoven conducts and plays piano in a marathon benefit concert at the Theater an der Wien in Vienna consisting entirely of first public performances of works by him including the Symphony No. 5, Symphony No. 6, Piano Concerto No. 4 and Choral Fantasy.
- Harvard University forms its own orchestra.
- Ignaz Schuppanzigh's Schuppanzigh Quartet enters the employment of Count Andrey Razumovsky.
- Ignaz Assmayer becomes organist of St Peter's Abbey, Salzburg.
- Beethoven's Violin Concerto is published. It has been performed once in 1807.
- Beethoven's Razumovsky quartets are published.

== Popular Music ==
- "Believe Me, if All Those Endearing Young Charms", part of the Irish Melodies by poet Thomas Moore and composer (Sir) John Andrew Stevenson
- “Poor Will Putty” aka “Smithfield Bargain”, sung by Joseph Grimaldi in Harlequin’s Lottery
- “A Bull in a China Shop”, sung by Joseph Grimaldi in Harlequin Highflyer, debuted July 4, 1808

== Classical music ==
- Ludwig van Beethoven
  - Symphony No. 5, Op. 67 (completed)
  - Symphony No. 6, Op. 68
  - Cello Sonata No. 3, Op. 69
  - Piano Trios Op. 70 (including the "Ghost" Piano Trio)
  - Fantasia in C minor, Op. 80
  - 2 Marches for Military Band, WoO 18-19
  - "Andenken", WoO 136
- Bernhard Henrik Crusell – Clarinet Concerto no. 2
- Johann Nepomuk Hummel – Piano Sonata No.4, Op. 38
- Etienne Mehul – Symphony No.1 in G minor
- Ferdinand Ries
  - Piano Quartet, Op. 13
  - Cello Sonata, Op. 20
  - Cello Sonata, Op. 21
  - Quintet or Septet, Op. 25
  - Piano Sonata, Op. 26
  - Violin Sonata No. 19 in D minor, Op. 83
- Alessandro Rolla
  - Viola Concertino in E-flat major, BI 328
  - Divertimento for Viola and String Quartet, BI 330
- Louis Spohr
  - 2 Duos for 2 Violins, Op. 9
  - String Quartet No.4, Op. 15 No.1
  - Potpourri No.4, Op. 24
  - Clarinet Concerto No.1, Op. 26
  - Violin Concerto No.6, Op. 28
  - Symphonie concertante No.1, Op. 48
- Carl Maria von Weber
  - 7 Variations sur un thème original, Op. 9
  - Momento capriccioso, Op. 12
  - 6 Lieder, Op. 15
  - Grand potpourri, Op. 20
  - Grande polonaise, Op. 21
  - Silvana, J.87 (opera)

== Births ==
- February 14 – Michael Costa, Italian-born conductor and composer (died 1884)
- February 28 – Elias Parish Alvars, English-born arranger and harpist (died 1849)
- March 24 – Maria Malibran, French-born Spanish soprano (died 1836)
- April 10 – Auguste Franchomme, French cellist and composer (died 1884)
- May 15 – Michael William Balfe, Irish composer (died 1870)
- October 24 – Ernst Richter, German musical theorist (died 1879)
- December 26 – Albert Grisar, Belgian composer (died 1869)

== Deaths ==
- February 29 – Carlos Baguer, Spanish composer (born 1768)
- April 4 – Carlo Gozzi, Venetian lyricist and playwright (born 1720)
- May 14 – Robert Broderip, English organist and composer
- May 22 – Edmund Ayrton, English organist (born 1734)
- July 20 – François-Hippolyte Barthélémon, French violinist (born 1741)
- September 29 – Paul Wranitzky, Moravian composer (born 1756)
- December 1 – Anton Fischer, German composer and tenor (born 1778)
- date unknown – Gaétan Vestris, French ballet dancer (born 1729)
