= 1809 in music =

== Events ==
- June 15 – Mozart's Requiem is performed at a memorial service for Joseph Haydn at the Schottenkirche, Vienna.
- Stalybridge Old Band formed in the north of England, perhaps the first civilian brass band in the world.

== Popular music ==
- "Clown's Catalogue of Odd Fish", aka "Odd Fish", aka "Grimaldi's Catalogue of Odd Fish", sung by Joseph Grimaldi in Fashion's Fool or the Aquatic Harlequin
- "Whip Club", sung by Joseph Grimaldi in Fashion's Fool or the Aquatic Harlequin

== Classical music ==
- Ludwig van Beethoven
  - Piano Concerto No. 5, Op. 73 ("Emperor")
  - String Quartet No. 10 "Harp" in E-flat major, Op. 74
  - 6 Songs, Op. 75
  - Six variations on an original theme (the Turkish March from The Ruins of Athens) in D major, Op. 76
  - Fantasia for Piano in G minor, Op. 77
  - Piano Sonata No. 24 in F-sharp major, Op. 78
  - Piano Sonata No. 25 in G major, Op. 79
  - Four Ariettas and a Duet, Op. 82
  - Egmont, Op. 84 (incidental music for the play by Goethe)
  - Die laute Klage, WoO 135 (or 1815)
  - Lied aus der Ferne, WoO 137
  - Der Jüngling in der Fremde, WoO 138
  - Der Liebende, WoO 139
- François-Joseph Gossec – Symphonie à 17 parties
- Johann Nepomuk Hummel – Salve Regina, WoO 18
- Etienne Mehul – Symphony No. 1 in G minor
- Ferdinand Ries
  - Symphony No. 1 in D major, Op. 23
  - Clarinet Trio in B-flat major, Op. 28
  - Clarinet Sonata, Op. 29
  - String Quartet, Op. 70 No.2
  - Piano Trio, Op. 28
- Carl Maria von Weber
  - 6 Pièces, Op. 10a
  - Serenade, J. 65
  - Andante e rondo ongarese, J. 79

== Opera ==
- Gaspare Spontini – Fernand Cortez

== Births ==
- January 20 – Sebastián Iradier, composer (died 1865)
- February 3 – Felix Mendelssohn, composer (died 1847)
- March 19 – Fredrik Pacius, conductor and composer (died 1891)
- March 31 – Otto Lindblad, composer (died 1864)
- April 13 – Aleksander Mirecki, violinist (died 1882)
- August 6 – Alfred Tennyson, lyricist and poet (died 1892)
- August 21 – Hanna Brooman, composer, translator and educator (died 1887)
- August 30 – Adolf Friedrich Hesse, composer (died 1863)
- October 2 – Anton Emil Titl, composer (died 1882)
- October 12 – John Liptrot Hatton, composer, conductor, pianist and singer (died 1886)
- October 15 – Aleksey Koltsov, lyricist and poet (died 1842)
- October 21 – Daniel Friedrich Eduard Wilsing, composer (died 1893)
- October 22 – Federico Ricci, opera composer (died 1877)
- November 16 – Leopoldine Blahetka, pianist and composer (died 1885)
- November 26 – Auguste-François Morel, composer (died 1881)

== Deaths ==
- January 29 – Luigi Antonio Sabbatini, composer and music theorist (born 1732)
- February – Francesco Azopardi, composer (born 1748)
- March 7 – Johann Georg Albrechtsberger, organist, composer and music teacher (born 1736)
- April 17 – Johann Christian Kittel, organist and composer (born 1732)
- April 18 – Birgitte Winther, opera singer (born 1751)
- May 1 – Gottlieb Konrad Pfeffel, librettist and writer (born 1736)
- May 31 – Joseph Haydn, composer (born 1732)
- July 2 or (3) – Joseph Quesnel, composer and writer (born 1746)
- July 24 – Johann Gottfried Eckard, pianist and composer (born 1735)
- September 21 – Alexander Reinagle, composer, organist, and theater musician (born 1736)
- December 31 – Franz Ignaz Beck, composer (born 1734)
