= Op. 83 =

In music, Op. 83 stands for Opus number 83. Compositions that are assigned this number include:

- Brahms – Piano Concerto No. 2
- Elgar – String Quartet
- Glazunov – Symphony No. 8
- Prokofiev – Piano Sonata No. 7
- Ries – Violin Sonata No. 19
- Saint-Saëns – Havanaise
- Schumann – 3 Gesänge
- Shostakovich – String Quartet No. 4
- Sibelius – Everyman (Jedermann or Jokamies), theatre score for soloists, mixed choir, and orchestra (1916)
