= Op. 28 =

In music, Op. 28 stands for Opus number 28. Compositions that are assigned this number include:

- Beethoven – Piano Sonata No. 15
- Britten – A Ceremony of Carols
- Chopin – Preludes, Op. 28
- Danzi – Horn Sonata No. 1
- Elgar – Organ Sonata
- Enescu – Impressions d'enfance
- Ginastera – Piano Concerto No. 1
- Holbrooke – Horn Trio
- Holst – First Suite in E-flat for Military Band
- Korngold – Die Kathrin
- Myaskovsky – Symphony No. 9
- Prokofiev – Piano Sonata No. 3
- Rachmaninoff – Piano Sonata No. 1
- Ries – Piano Trio, Op. 28
- Saint-Saëns – Introduction and Rondo Capriccioso
- Schmitt – Reflets d'Allemagne
- Schumann – Three Romances for piano
- Scriabin – Fantaisie in B minor
- Strauss – Till Eulenspiegel's Merry Pranks
- Szymanowski – Nocturne and Tarantella
- Vierne – Organ Symphony No. 3
- Waterhouse – Three Pieces for Solo Cello
- Webern – String Quartet
