= Op. 156 =

In music, Op. 156 stands for Opus number 156. Compositions that are assigned this number include:

- Lachner – Octet
- Robber – Die Räuberbraut
- Saint-Saëns – Cyprès et lauriers
