= Violin Concerto in E minor =

Violin Concerto in E minor may refer to:

- "Il favorito", RV 277, the second of the Six Concertos, Op. 11 (Vivaldi)
- Violin Concerto (Ries)
- Violin Concerto (Mendelssohn)
