= Flute Sonata =

Flute Sonata may refer to:

- Flute sonata, a sonata for flute and, usually, piano
- Flute Sonata (Martinů), H. 306, was composed in 1945
- Flute Sonata (Poulenc), FP 164, by Francis Poulenc, for flute and piano, was written in 1957
- Flute Sonata (Prokofiev), Op. 94, composed by Sergei Prokofiev in 1943
- Flute Sonata No. 4 (Ries), Op. 87, is a composition for piano and flute by Ferdinand Ries published in 1819
- Flute Sonata (attrib. Beethoven), is a flute sonata attributed to Ludwig van Beethoven
