= Violin Sonata No. 5 (Ries) =

1808 sonata by Ferdinand Ries

Ferdinand Ries composed the Violin Sonata No. 5 in B♭ major, Op. 10 in 1808, while he was in Paris. During the same period he also composed his Op. 20 & Op. 21 cello sonatas and a D-minor violin sonata that remained unpublished until 1818. The B♭ major sonata was first published in 1810 by both Breitkopf & Härtel and Simrock with a dedication to a "Monsieur Eichhof, directeur Général de l'Octroi de Navigation du Rhein". Subsequent editions were published in the 1820s. (Note: The IMSLP score notes that a Breitkopf & Härtel edition was advertised in an 1810 edition of AmZ.)

== Composition History ==
As with many of Ries's compositions, there is little to go on beyond the manuscript evidence itself, in this case, the manuscript survives in the Berlin State Library, while a copy of the published score kept in the Royal College of Music, London contains a number of interpolated manuscript sheets in the composers handwriting showing that at a later point he was reworking the sonata so that could be performed by a piano soloist without the accompaniment of the violin. Cecil Hill speculates that this may have been intended for an English publisher, but no print edition of this version has been located.

== Structure ==
The sonata is in two movements:

1. Allegro ma non troppo
2. Rondo Pastorale: Allegretto (Note: Cecil Hill gives the tempo for this movement as simply Allegretto, the additional indications are from the published score.)
