= Op. 10 =

In music, Op. 10 stands for Opus number 10. Compositions that are assigned this number include:

- Beethoven – Piano Sonata No. 5
- Beethoven – Piano Sonata No. 6
- Beethoven – Piano Sonata No. 7
- Brahms – 4 Ballades
- Britten – Variations on a Theme of Frank Bridge
- Chopin – Études Op. 10
- Dohnányi – Serenade in C major
- Duruflé – Quatre Motets sur des thèmes grégoriens
- Dvořák – Symphony No. 3
- Enescu – Piano Suite No. 2
- Ginastera – Cinco canciones populares argentinas
- Ippolitov-Ivanov – Caucasian Sketches, Suite No. 1
- Larsson – Sinfonietta in C major, for strings (1932)
- Mozart – Haydn Quartets
- Prokofiev – Piano Concerto No. 1
- Rachmaninoff – Morceaux de salon, Op. 10
- Ries – Violin Sonata No. 5
- Schumann – 6 Concert Studies on Caprices by Paganini
- Shostakovich – Symphony No. 1
- Sibelius – Karelia Overture, for orchestra (1893)
- Strauss – Die Nacht
- Vivaldi – La tempesta di mare
- Vivaldi – Six Flute Concertos, Op. 10
