= Violin Sonata in A-flat major (Ries) =

1800 composition by Ferdinand Ries

Ferdinand Ries composed his Violin Sonata in A♭ major, WoO. 5 (Note: The manuscript title is "Grande Sonata pour le Piano-Forte ou Clavecin avec un Violon oblige") in 1800, when he was 18 years old. There is no evidence the work was performed during the composer's lifetime, and it remained unpublished at his death. The manuscript survives at the Berlin State Library.

== Structure ==
The sonata is structured in four movements:

1. Allegro ma non troppo
2. Scherzo
3. Adagio con moto
4. Rondo: Allegretto
