= Violin Sonata No. 19 (Ries) =

1808 sonata by Ferdinand Ries

Ferdinand Ries's Violin Sonata No. 19 in D minor, Op. 83, was composed in Paris in 1808, the same year as the composer's violin sonata Op. 10 and the Op. 20 and Op. 21 cello sonatas. The composition was not published, however, until 1818, after he had moved to London, in a simultaneous edition by both Clementi & Co and Chappell & Co. with a dedication to the "Princess Hatzfeld".

== Structure ==
The sonata is in three movements:

1. Allegro con brio
2. Andantino con moto
3. Rondo: Allegro vivace

Typical performances should take around 20 minutes.
