= Concerto for Two Horns (Ries) =

1811 composition by Ferdinand Ries

Ferdinand Ries composed his Concerto for Two Horns in F major, WoO 19 in 1811, while staying in Kassel following his failure to obtain the position of Kapelmeister to the court of the Kingdom of Westphalia. Written for two virtuoso horn players in the Kassel Orchestra, Johann Michael and Johann Gottfried Schuncke, the concerto was premiered at a concert on 23 February 1811. Despite a favorable review of this performance, Ries elected not to have the work published, nor did he assign it an opus number.

Bert Hagels speculates Ries made this decision because he regarded the work as an occasional piece; certainly its need for two highly skilled horn players would have made it harder to market compared with his solo concertos. Nevertheless, Ries retained the manuscript for the remainder of his life and it can now be found in the Berlin State Library.

== Instrumentation ==
The concerto is scored for two natural horns (soloists) and an orchestra composed of violins, violas, cellos, double bass, flute, clarinets, bassoons and horns.

== Structure ==
The concerto is in three movements:

1. [Without tempo indication]
2. Andante
3. Rondo

Typical performances take around 25 to 27 minutes.
