= Piano Trio, Op. 28 (Ries) =

Chamber music composition by Ferdinand Ries

Piano Trio in B♭ major
- by Ferdinand Ries
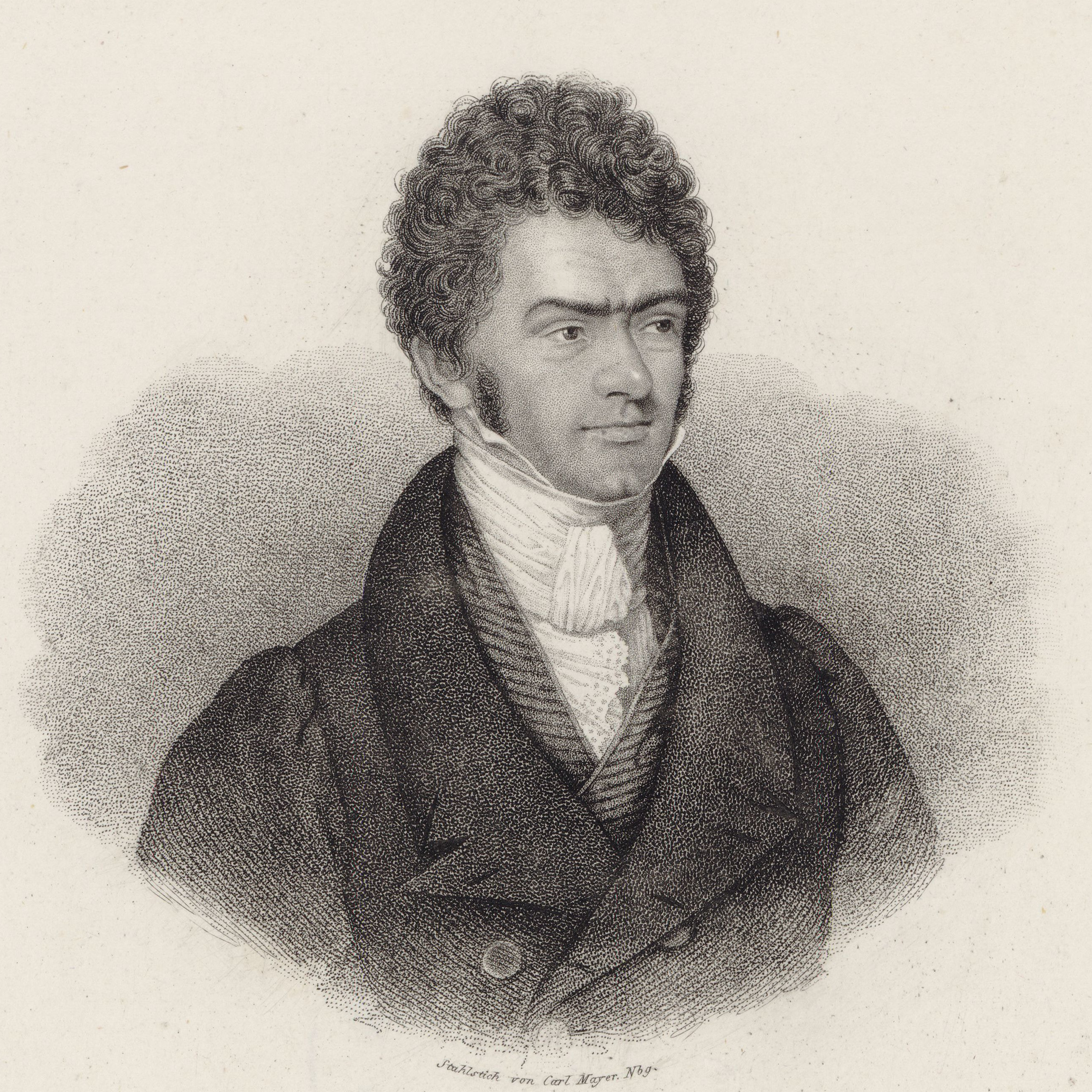
- Key: B♭ major
- Opus: 28
- Composed: 1809 or 1810
- Dedication: Mademoiselle Clairette Ludwigs
- Published: 1811
- Publisher: Simrock
- Duration: 24:00 (approx.)
- Movements: Four
- Scoring: Piano, clarinet (or violin), cello

The Trio for Piano, Clarinet and Cello in B♭ major, Op. 28, was composed by Ferdinand Ries in either Bonn in 1809 or Aachen in 1810 during the period he left Vienna to avoid being drafted into the Austrian army. It was published in 1811 by Simrock with a dedication to a Mademoiselle Clairette Ludwigs.

== Composition history ==
Little is known about the precise circumstances under which the composer wrote this trio. Martin Harlow in his thesis points out that the composer listed the work as being composed in 1809 in Bonn in his thematic catalog, while Bert Hagels, in the liner notes to the cpo recording states that he believes the work was composed in Aachen about a year later.

The publication of the work in 1811 by Simrock is well documented, but there is no surviving documentation relating to the first performance of the work. The publication history of the work, which shows that the work was printed multiple times, suggests that the work was well received.

== Instrumentation ==
The Trio is scored for piano, clarinet (or violin) and cello.

== Structure ==
The composition is in four movements:

1. Allegro
2. Scherzo: Allegro vivace
3. Adagio
4. Rondo: Allegro ma non troppo

Hagels points out in his liner notes that, while using the instrumentation and key of Beethoven's Op. 11 Trio, the structure of Ries's Op. 28 Trio makes use of a four-movement plan similar to the older composer's Op. 1 Piano Trios or the Op. 9 String Trios. Both Harlow and Robert Silvertrust state that, in this work, Ries managed to compose a work that was not a chamber concerto for piano but true chamber music, where all three instruments share in the thematic material. Harlow speculates that in the case of the cello, this may have been due to the influence of cellist Bernhard Romberg, a former teacher and dedicatee of Ries's Opp.20 and 21 cello sonatas. Both authors agree, however, that at one point in the work the piano becomes dominant. Silvertrust believed this moment occurs in the Adagio movement, where the piano states the theme for the cello to repeat. Harlow believes that this moment lies in the last movement, where the piano is given virtuoso passagework causing it to overshadow the other instruments.
