= Violin Concerto (Ries) =

The Violin Concerto in E minor, Op. 24 by Ferdinand Ries, was composed around 1810 while the composer was living in Bonn. It appears to have been written for his father, Franz Anton Ries, who gave the first (and only known) performance of the work at a concert in Bonn on 15 December 1810.

Following the performance, Ries started to revise the work with the intent of publishing it as his Op. 24., (Note: This work was counted as the composer's "Concerto No. 1" in his catalog of publications, his eight piano concertos were numbered 2-9 upon publication as a result. These are numbers for his 9 solo concertos, not for his piano concertos.) However for reasons unknown, this did not take place until 1885, when the firm Ries & Erler published it for Violin and Piano in 1885.

For many years it was believed that the orchestral parts for the concerto were lost, however two manuscript copies of the parts, one by Ferdinand Ries, the other by a copyist, were discovered in the Berlin State Library.

It is scored for violin solo, double woodwind, two horns, two trumpets, timpani and strings.

== Structure ==
The concerto is in three movements:

1. Allegro
2. Larghetto
3. Allegro – Rondo: Vivace
