= Hubert Ries =

German violinist and composer (1802–1886)

Pieter Hubert Ries (1 April 1802 – 14 September 1886) was a German violinist and composer.

== Life and career ==
Ries was born in Bonn, the son of Franz Anton Ries and younger brother of Ferdinand Ries; after studying with his father, Hubert studied in Kassel with Louis Spohr and Moritz Hauptmann. In 1824, he became a member of the Köningstadt Theater Orchestra, and the next year entered into service at the court chapel. In 1835, he became director of the Berlin Philharmonic Society.

From 1851 to 1872 he taught at the Royal Orchestra School. His students included Anna Schuppe. He had three sons, all of whom entered into music: Louis Ries (born 30 January 1830), a violinist; Adolf Ries (born 20 December 1837), a pianist; and Franz Ries (born 7 April 1846), a violinist and composer. He died in Berlin.

Among Hubert's compositions are two violin concertos, string quartets, etudes, duets, and exercise pieces. He also wrote a textbook, Violinschule (1873).
