= Symphony No. 7 (Ries) =

1835 symphony by Ferdinand Ries

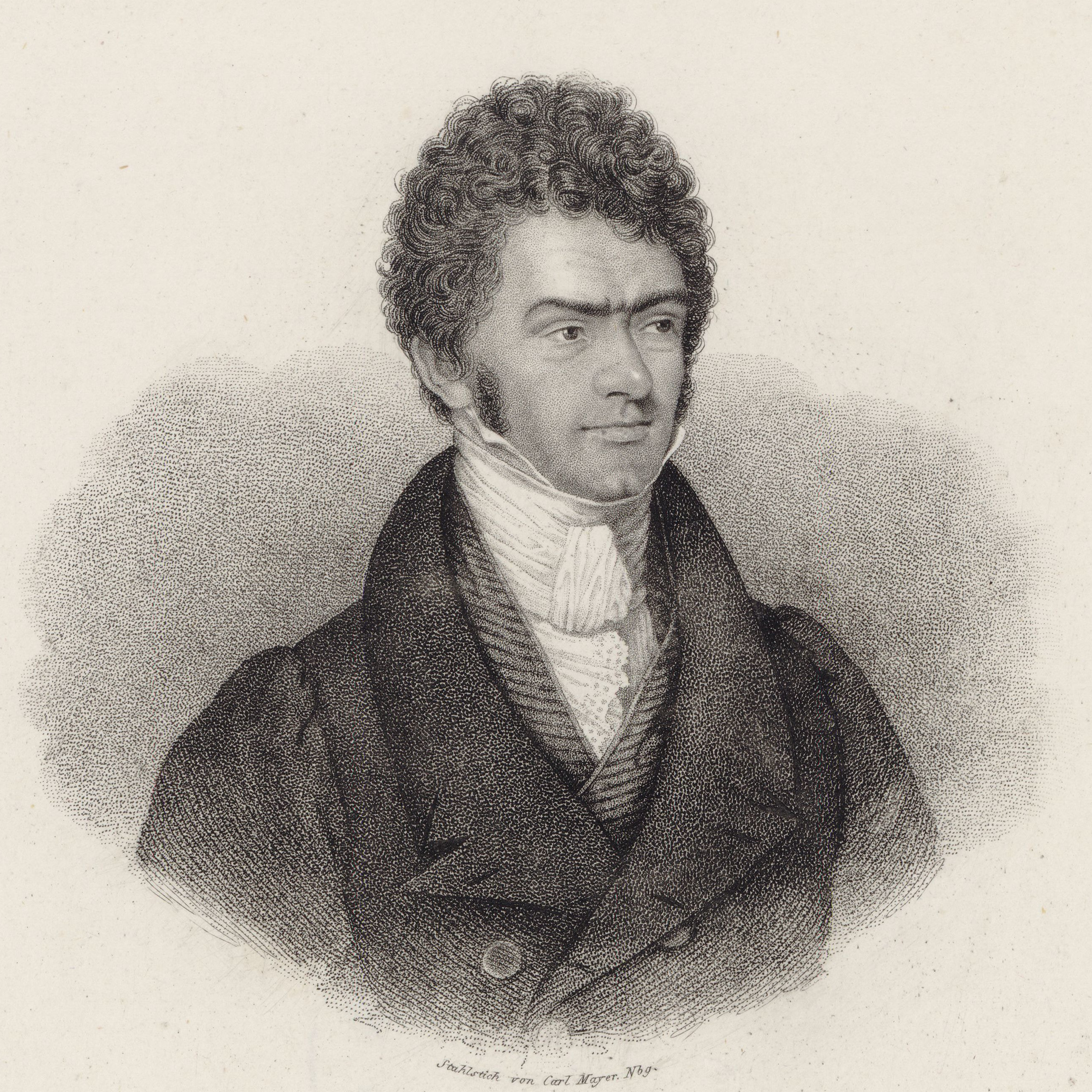
Ferdinand Ries

Ferdinand Ries wrote his Symphony No. 7 in A minor, Op. 181, during the spring and summer of 1835, 12 years after the composition of his Symphony No. 6 and the Sinfonie WoO 30 (Often referred to as Symphony No. 8). This is the last symphony that Ries wrote. It is Beethovenian in style, and specifically influenced by Beethovens's seventh, sixth ("Pastorale"), and third ("Eroica") symphonies.

This symphony is written in four movements and is scored for 2 Flutes, 2 Oboes, 2 Clarinets, 2 Bassoons, 4 Horns, 2 Trumpets, 3 Trombones (Alto, Tenor, and Bass), Timpani, and Strings.

== Movements ==
The symphony has four movements:

1. Allegro con spirito
2. Larghetto con moto
3. Scherzo Allegro non troppo
4. Largo – Finale: Allegro vivace

== Composition History ==
This symphony was supposedly a compositional commission, as Ries wrote to his brother, Joseph Ries on 9 March 1835: "I now want to write a symphony, which is ordered for Vienna." Ries appeared to have hopes about this symphony. The past few years were not the most uplifting for him. On 20 April he again wrote to his brother Joseph: "From my symphony, which I have in work, I promise myself a lot," suggesting that he had planned a substantial composition. In early July Ries wrote to his brother to inform him about the beginning of the composition of the finale: "From Vienna, a company lover has ordered a symphony with me, I am at the last Allegro, it will not be bad, I can tell you."

On 24 July he returned to the Viennese publisher Trentsensky & Vieweg with the score. The score was sold to the publisher SA Steiner, whose owner was Tobias Haslinger, on 31 August.

In 1835, Haslinger played a key role in the organization of a symphony competition, whose publicity he hoped for in the sales opportunities of his publishing products. In order to participate in this contest a number of composers had been invited to submit their symphonies anonymously, but with a motto of identification, "to the kk court and private art and music therapy of Mr. Tobias Haslinger in Vienna frankly", as it is called in the official tender text published in various German-language music magazines. The winners waved a prize of 50 ducats and performances of the award-winning work in the prestigious Viennese _concerts spirituels_.

Haslinger acquired the symphony by Ries with the intention of submitting it order to bring a prize-winning work to the market, should it win a prize. The copy of the symphony, which had been sent to Vienna, received a new title without the composer's name, but with the motto "I have done my own." The fact that the work was actually submitted is confirmed by the publication of keys and foreign exchange of the 57 symphonies, which were recorded in December 1835; There appears as No. 15 a symphony in A minor with the motto, "I have done my own." Ries himself does not seem to have been asked for his consent; only afterward was he informed of his involuntary participation in the competition. On 16 June 1836, he wrote to Joseph Ries:

A new symphony will soon be released. You will remember that a company lover in Vienna ordered a symphony in Vienna last summer. I am now, to my great surprise, that Haslinger, who has always given me so bad a position, that I could never sell him a MS Wanted: / this Sinf: bought from these lovers to themselves and also entered the price work for symphonies. What you do not experience!

Hopes for the publication of the symphony were in vain; In January 1836 the jury had already announced the prize-winner: Franz Lachner. Along with the winner, particularly worthy compositions were mentioned, but the symphony of Ries was not among them. Haslinger may no longer have been interested in its publication as well. This last symphony by Ferdinand Ries remained unpublished until 1982; The symphony was not published in Ries' time. Ries himself seems to have refrained from his initial optimism with regard to the work, and no performances are known; the only recording of this work served as its world premiere.

Ries' symphonies were numbered, on the whole, in order, not of composition, but of publication and/or first performance in England. The publisher Schuberth also applied op.181 to Ries' Introduction et Rondeau à la Zingaresco for piano published in 1838. The 1860s Abschrift parts (manuscript copy) held at the Staatsbibliothek zu Berlin use Op. 181 to describe the symphony.

== Recordings ==
The only recording that has been made is by Howard Griffiths conducting the Zürcher Kammerorchester.

== Bibliography ==
- "Ries 7772162 [RB]: Classical CD Reviews - February 2007 MusicWeb-International". www.musicweb-international.com.
- Hill, Cecil (1982). Three Symphonies: 1, 3, 8 (Ries). New York: Garland Publications. ISBN 0824038177.
- RISM 452500313 RISM Description of 1860s Abschrift Parts of the 7th Symphony
- http://bert-hagels.de/ries181.htm
