= Clarinet Sonata (Ries) =

Musical composition by Ferdinand Ries

- Chamber music by Ferdinand Ries
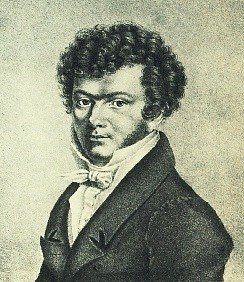
- The composer
- Key: G minor
- Opus: 29
- Composed: 1809
- Published: 1812
- Movements: three
- Scoring: clarinet (or violin); piano

Ferdinand Ries composed his Clarinet Sonata in G minor, Op. 29, in Bonn in 1809 according to his thematic catalog, but it was not published until 1812 by Simrock without a dedication. Its composition history is unclear but it may have been written with a particular clarinetist in mind. The work has sometimes been transcribed for violin.

== Composition history ==
Like for the composer's Clarinet Trio, Op. 28, there is little documentation relating to the circumstances under which it was composed or performed, but the fact that the work was widely published suggests it was well received.

Martin Harlow writes that the work was probably composed with a specific skilled clarinetist in mind, citing the fact that the work is written as a true duet with both instruments given equal prominence, whereas many of the composer's later flute sonatas, composed for the amateur market, are dominated by the piano with the flute providing melodic support only. Hagels supports this conjecture by noting that the final movement of the work contains provision for the clarinetist to play improvised cadenzas. In addition, Harlow states that when he examined the printed score, it was clear that the work had been composed as a clarinet sonata and then transcribed for violin rather than the other way round.

== Instrumentation and structure ==
The work is instrumented for clarinet (or violin) and piano. It is in three movements:

1. Adagio – Allegro
2. Adagio con moto
3. Adagio – Allegro non troppo – Prestissimo

Bert Hagels comments in his liner notes that much of the structure (but not the themes) in the first movement makes use of musical procedures which Beethoven pioneered in his Piano Sonata, Op. 53 and Symphony, Op.67.

Martin Harlow identifies this sonata as an important milestone in the development of the clarinet sonata because this work is one of the earliest known clarinet sonatas where there is balance between effective writing for the clarinet that exploits its full potential, and innovative thematic material.
