= Cello Sonata No. 4 (Ries) =

1823 composition by Ferdinand Ries

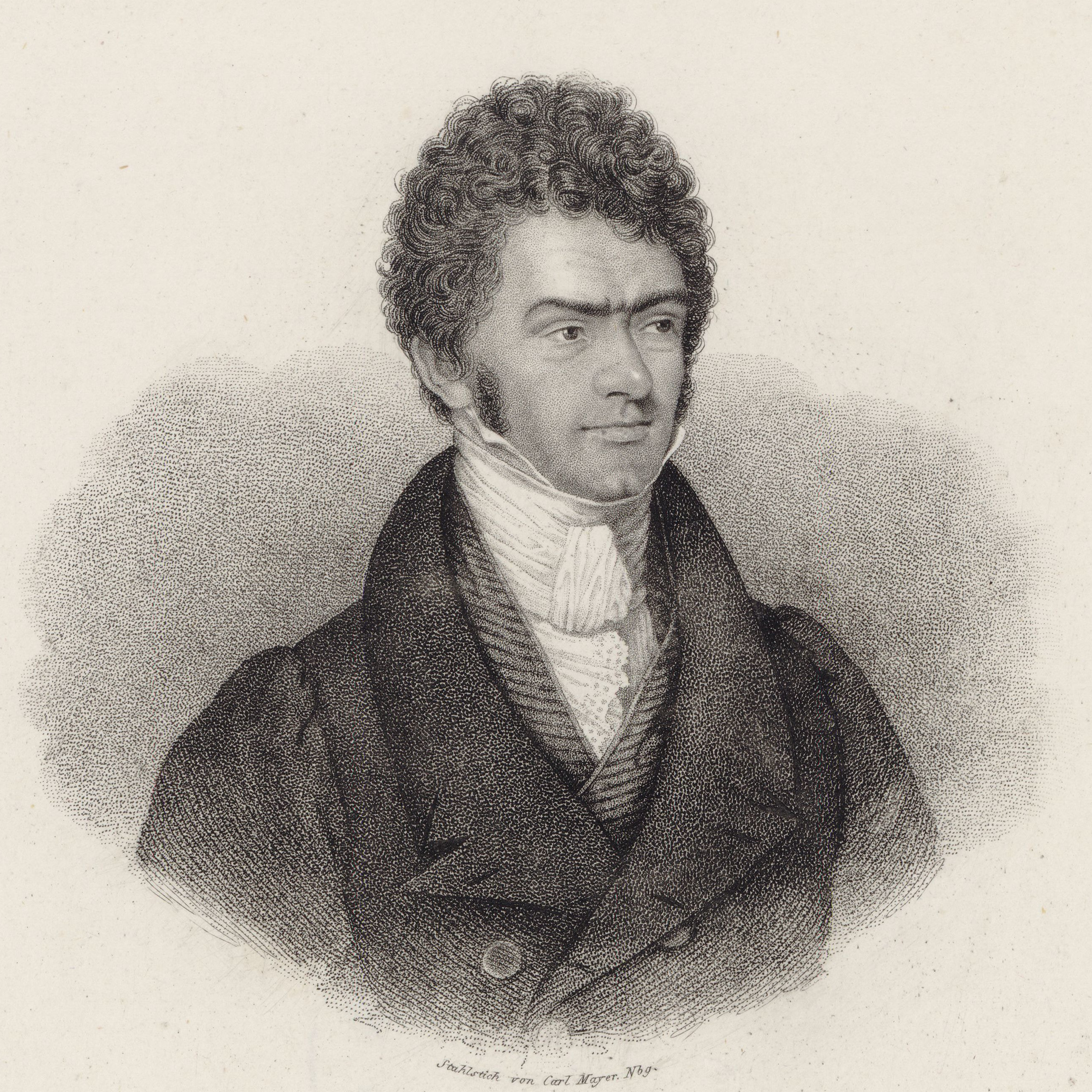
Ferdinand Ries

Ferdinand Ries's Cello Sonata No. 4, Op. 125 was composed in London in 1823, but was not published until 1825 by T. Boosey & Co. It is one of the final instrumental sonatas published by the composer before his death in 1838.

== Composition history ==
Little is known of the precise circumstances under which the sonata was composed until Ries offered it to T. Boosey & Co, along with several other works in August 1823. Only the sonata, the composer's Piano Octet, Op. 128 along with a piano fantasia on a theme from von Weber's Der Freischütz were accepted with only the sonata and the fantasia making it to publication in 1825.

When published, the sonata included an alternate violin part to the cello part, this leads Bert Hagels to comment that the work was probably not composed with a concert performance in mind, but rather was intended for sale on the British amateur/private music market for private performance. As published the sonata was dedicated to Sir Herbert Taylor at that time serving as Military Secretary to the British Army, presumably as a means of increasing sales. Cole Tutino notes that the composers manuscript bears a different dedication to a "Madamme de Montagny", and speculates that she may have been the intended recipient of the manuscript which currently resides in the Bavarian State Library.

== Structure ==
The sonata is structured in three movements:

1. Grave — Allegro
2. Larghetto con moto
3. Rondo: Allegretto

Bert Hagels in his comments that the opening movement of the sonata has some structural (but not musical) influences from Beethoven's, Op. 5, No. 2 Cello Sonata, Tutino agrees, speculating that may have been due to the fact that Ries had once arranged Beethoven's sonata for string quintet. Unlike the flute sonatas the composer wrote in England, this work is scored for two performers of approximately equal skill level and like the other cello sonatas he composed is a true duo, rather than a piano sonata with cello accompaniment. Tutino concurs with this assessment, pointing out that both players would require fairly advanced skills in their respective instruments to successfully perform the sonata. Martin Rummel in the notes to the Naxos recording of the sonata broadly agrees with the previous authors, singling out the concluding rondo as showcasing both players abilities, he also noted structural similarities to Beethoven's Op. 69 Cello Sonata and suggests that while the Opp. 20 & 21 Cello Sonata's were intended for Bernhard Romberg, this sonata was aimed at a playing style similar to that attributed to Jean-Pierre Duport the cellist for whom Beethoven composed his first cello sonatas.
