= Flute Sonata No. 4 (Ries) =

- Chamber music by Ferdinand Ries
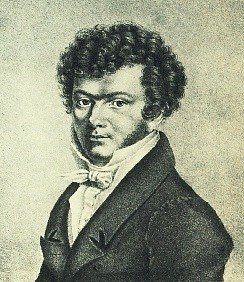
- The composer
- Key: G major
- Opus: 87
- Composed: c. 1815
- Published: 1819
- Movements: three
- Scoring: flute; piano

The Flute Sonata No. 4 in G major, Op. 87, (Note: Published as Sonata for Pianoforte with Flauto Obbligato, Op.87) is a composition for piano and flute by Ferdinand Ries that was published at The Regents Harmonic Institution in London in 1819. Little information about the works composition history is known as the composers manuscript is undated, but Alan Bradly in the preface to the score published by Artaria Editions indicates that the work may have been composed around 1815 along with a number of other works for the same instrumental combination.

== Structure ==
The work is in three movements:

1. Allegro
2. Larghetto
3. Allegretto

Unlike the composers earlier Clarinet sonata, this work was written for the amateur market with the piano dominating the thematic material while the flute provides accompaniment. The original publication noted that the composer had prepared alternate passages for the piano allowing the piece to be performed without the flute.
