= Symphony No. 5 (Ries) =

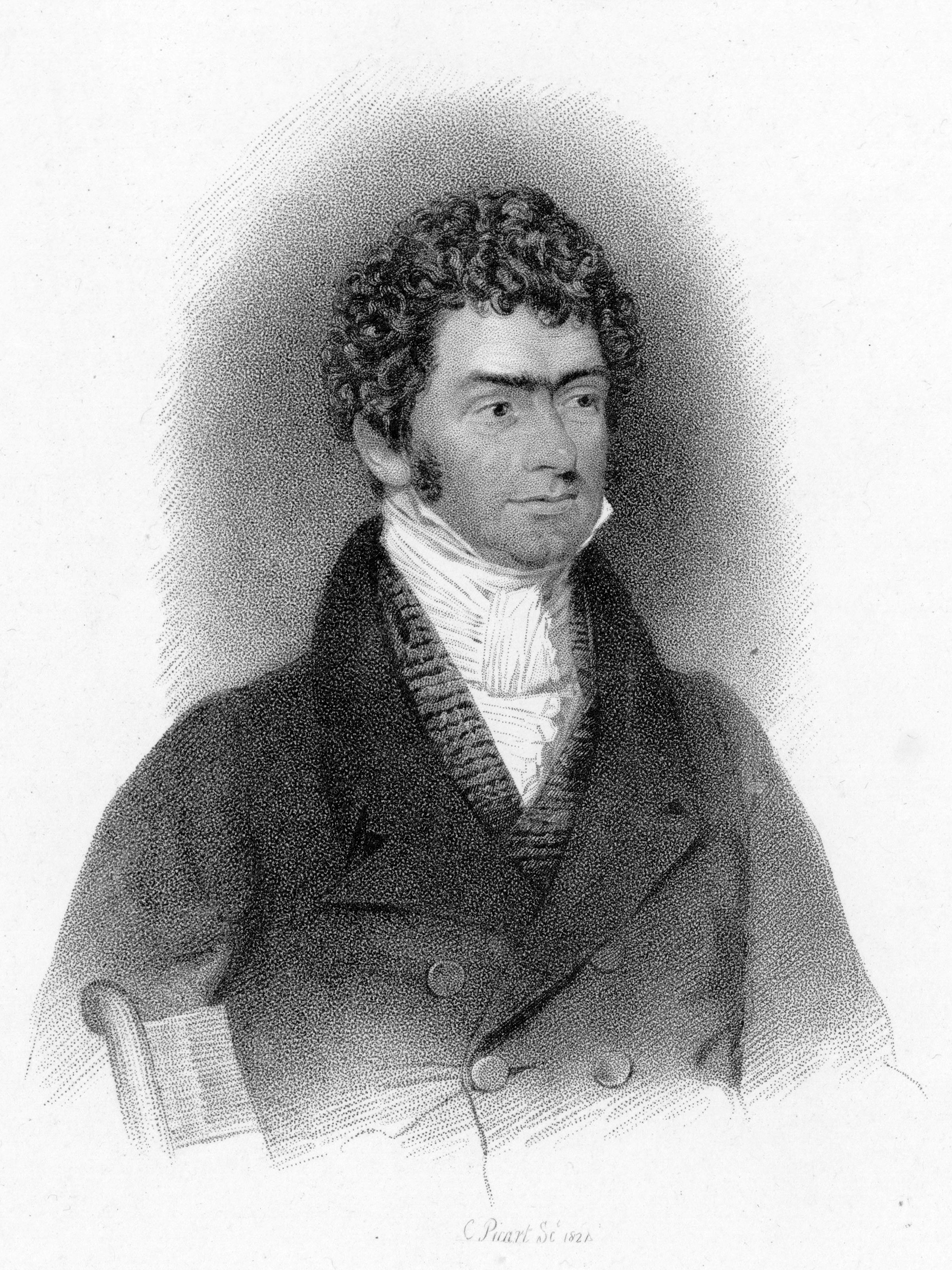
Ferdinand Ries in 1821

Ferdinand Ries composed the Symphony No. 5 in D minor, Op. 112, in London in 1813. It was the second symphony Ries wrote. It was first performed at a Philharmonic Society concert on 14 February 1814. In 1823, Breitkopf & Härtel published the work together with piano solo, piano duet and chamber arrangements.

The symphony is in four movements:

1. Allegro
2. Larghetto con moto quasi andante
3. Allegro assai
4. Allegro

It is scored for flute, 2 oboes, 2 bassoons, 2 horns, 2 trumpets, 3 trombones, timpani, and strings.

Inspired by Ludwig van Beethoven's Symphony No. 5 in C minor, Ries's Fifth uses the rhythm of Beethoven's famous "Fate" motif with different pitches. The piece has been recorded by the Zurich Chamber Orchestra conducted by Howard Griffiths on the Classic Produktion Osnabrück label.
