= Cello Sonata No. 1 (Ries) =

Ferdinand Ries composed his Cello Sonata No. 1 in C minor, WoO. 2 in 1799, when he was 17 years old. While the work remained unpublished and does not appear to have been performed in public during the composers lifetime, it is one of the composers earliest surviving compositions, predating his period of study with Beethoven and is the first of four cello sonatas he composed during his life.

There are two copies of the manuscript extant, the first is the composers autograph, held by the Berlin State Library, the second is a copy in an unknown hand held by the Royal College of Music.

== Structure ==
The sonata is structured in three movements:

1. Grave – Allegro
2. Adagio
3. Finale: Prestissimo

Cole Tutino, in his thesis notes that while written before Ries studied with Beethoven, the older composers influence clearly shows both in the piano writing and in the structure of the sonata which shows signs of being modeled on elements drawn from several of Beethoven's piano sonatas, most notably the Pathétique Sonata, Op. 13, published the same year that Ries composed this sonata. Tutino also notes that while in many ways the piano part is more technically challenging than the cello part, the work is nonetheless written as a true duo sonata.
