= Die Räuberbraut (opera) =

1829 opera by Ferdinand Ries

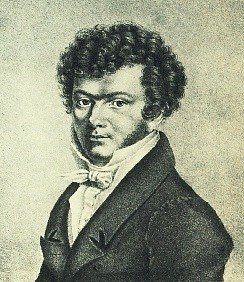
Ferdinand Ries

Die Räuberbraut (The Robber's Bride), Op. 156, is an opera in 3 acts by Ferdinand Ries, written in 1828. The opera was a surprise hit. Ferdinand Ries marked his operatic debut with this opera. This work was heard in not only cities in Germany, but in Amsterdam, Paris, and London. This opera shows that Ries was capable of writing highly effective music for the stage.

== Composition history ==
Die Räuberbraut premiered on 15 October 1828 in Frankfurt am Main. This was Ries's introduction to the world of opera. Ries announced to his brother Joseph that his "opera libretto is already in the works." The author of the libretto for the opera was Johann Joseph Reiff. Ries was disappointed with the libretto as it was not the brilliant text he had hoped for. Ries said that he found "many things in it very lovely", but Ries insisted that "important changes must surely be made to the whole."

In March, 1827 he announced to his friend Franz Wegeler that he had completed several numbers: "My wife, who prefers only Mozart's and Beethoven's opera to all the others, claims she is wholly delighted with it."

While Ries was working on Die Räuberbraut, he learned about Beethoven's death. Ries took Beethoven's death quite hard. Ries said to his brother Joseph, "I cannot tell you how sorry it makes me feel," "I would so gladly have seen him again."

Discussions on the shape of the libretto continued quickly. Ries, finding it lacking in brevity, variety, and "good theatrical effect," asked Wegeler for dramaturgical assistance. Ries said, "The thing must explode at the end! And I hope it will do just that so that you, my friend Reiff, and the poor composer will all be rewarded." Ries asked other colleagues to cast a critical eye on his opera. "I hope the old proverb will not prove true in my case: that the donkey goes walking on ice." The music of Die Räuberbraut was rousingly received by his friends, but the critique of the libretto continued. Ries received the help of a Frankfurt musician, and writer, George Doring, who instantly did a thorough reworking of the text. This upset his original librettist, Reiff. The entire opera seemed destined to fail, but Ries refused to give up. Ries stated, "Apart from Spohr, we now have no German opera composer of any importance, so the thing could be significant for my future." Doring recommended to Ries that he should publish the new libretto without mentioning any names. This happened, although Reiff later published his original text separately. By then the score was largely finished, and had to be completely re-worked to fit Doring's revamped libretto. Given the weakness and unmotivated plot twists, the state of the original libretto can hardly be imagined. Ries ventured to circulate Doring's libretto, and he proudly reported that even the famed Louis Spohr and other colleagues "say they find it very promising."

== Performance history ==
The Trio and the Chorus of Brigands created a great stir at a concert performance in December 1828, while Ries was still working on the finale. The full premiere of the opera was scheduled for early 1829, but had to be cancelled due to quarrels over the casting and payment of the lead female role causing the rehearsals to be broken off. The exasperated Ries stated, "It's a dreadful setback to my plans."

Finally after several postponements, the premiere took place on 15 October and was well received. Ries reported to his brother, "With huge applause from the audience, the house was full to bursting. My wife wept almost the entire evening, and since then my home has not been empty of friends."

Even at the premiere, Ries was still looking for "effects." He was deleting numbers that seemed "fatiguant" in rehearsal, and scuttling entire choruses and scenes. He devoted attention to the "lovely character" of the bandit chief Roberto, who "has conquered the hearts of all the girls." He also made sure that the melodies("Everyone here is humming them") were disseminated in arrangements.

The triumph of Die Räuberbraut threatened to be a flash in the pan. Repeated performances were stopped by illness and intrigues. Ries immediately talked with other theatres and had to wait half a year before the opera could get a second performance in Frankfurt. The next performance took place the following July in London. During this time Ries's name was still quite known. Several other German theatres, from Aachen to Leipzig, also performed Die Räuberbraut, always with great appreciation.

In February 1830, Ries conducted the work in Cologne. Ries wrote to his brother saying, "The moment I stepped out, I was given a clamorous reception from the audience and a fanfare from the orchestra. For these resources, it was an extraordinary performance." In 1831 Ries presented the opera to the King of Prussia in Berlin. Due to this, Ries could acquire some different resources: the great vocal tragedienne Wilhelmine Schröder-Devrient, the celebrated singer of Fidelio and later three Wagner premieres.

== Reviews ==
A review of the premiere in Allgemeine Musik Zeitung echoes the cheers of Ries's contemporaries at the "magnificent musical edifice and the triumph of our national muse." The critic also praised the overture to the work calling it a "new and original creation" and the critic goes on to laud not only the "poetic" Chorus of peasants, but also the "savage power" of the Chorus of Brigands and the "melodic grace" of Ferdnando's Cavantina. The critic goes on to praise many other parts from the opera. In conclusion the critic states that the work was "gruesomely romantic" effect of the bandit chief's aria and the "inexhaustible jubilant strength" of the finale, where "everything is calculated for cumulative impact."

== Connection to Mendelssohn ==
In 1830 Goethe saw a performance of Die Räuberbraut in Weimar. His assessment of the operatic hit has been passed down to us by Mendelssohn. Mendelssohn knew of the work and has passed down this work among other works by Ferdinand Ries.

== Roles ==
- Laura: Soprano – Doris Haus
- Gianettina: Soprano
- Fernando: Tenor – Christian August Joachim Leißring
- Graf Viterbo: Baritone – Josef Alois Dobler
- Anselmo: Baritone
- Carlo: Bass-baritone – Samuel Friedrich Hassel
- Räuberhauptmann Roberto: Bass – Franz Hauser
- Pietro: Tenor

== Synopsis ==
Act 1: On his birthday, the count of Viterbo discloses that he is the victim of a political intrigue and must flee the country. Of all people, his own foster son Pietro has betrayed him to the usurper who has seized control of the land. The Count entrusts his daughter Laura to the protection of his castellan Anselmo and the latter's daughter Gianettina

Pietro, seeking to win the bounty placed on the Count's head, hopes for support from the fearless bandit chief Roberto, who has an old score to settle with the Count: he had once asked for Laura's hand in marriage, only to be turned down and banished as a social inferior. But Roberto chases the intriguer away.

Roberto meets Laura, who is now outlawed and thus his social equal. He offers to save her father – if she agrees to marry him. Overcoming deep misgivings, she finally consents to his plan.

Soldiers under the command of Fernando and Carlo came to arrest the Count. Roberto spirits him out of the castle at the last moment. Fernando motes a likeness between a portrait of Laura and a lovely unknown girl he had rescued from mortal danger in Palermo a year earlier. When Laura enters, he immediately recognizes her. But before Pietro can reveal her secret – that she is not Gianettina's sister, but the Count's daughter – he is shot dead by Roberto.

Act 2: Laura broods over her lost happiness. She learns from Gianettina that her father is hiding in the castle vaults and wants to flee with her. Fernando tries to unveil Laura's true identity, but she refuses to betray her father and denies ever having met him in Palermo.

Carlo has found out that Laura is now a "robber bride." The news plunges Fernando into deep despair.

Roberto and his gang of bandits want to kill Fernando. Laura pleads for his life; only now does she promise to marry Roberto in return. Roberto leads the captive Fernando into the vaults, where he bids farewell to Laura.

Act 3: The bandits celebrate their carefree life. Roberto leads the Count to a boat and orders him to travel to the opposite shore, adding that Laura will follow him. Laura senses that she will never see her father again. Fernando has pursued Laura, but she confides to him that she is promised in marriage to Roberto. The two rivals conduct a duel, but Laura flings herself between them. In the ensuing melee between the soldiers and the bandits, Roberto is wounded. With his dying breath, he releases his bride to Fernando. The soldiers have seized the Count, but his fate likewise takes a positive turn: Carlo announces that the usurper must flee the country, the arrest warrants for his political adversaries are now null and void. All celebrate their freedom, and the Count blesses the young couple, Laura and Fernando.

== Recordings ==
There is only one recording of this opera in existence; WDR Sinfonieorchester Köln conducted by Howard Griffiths.
