= Franz Anton Ries =

German violinist (1755–1846)

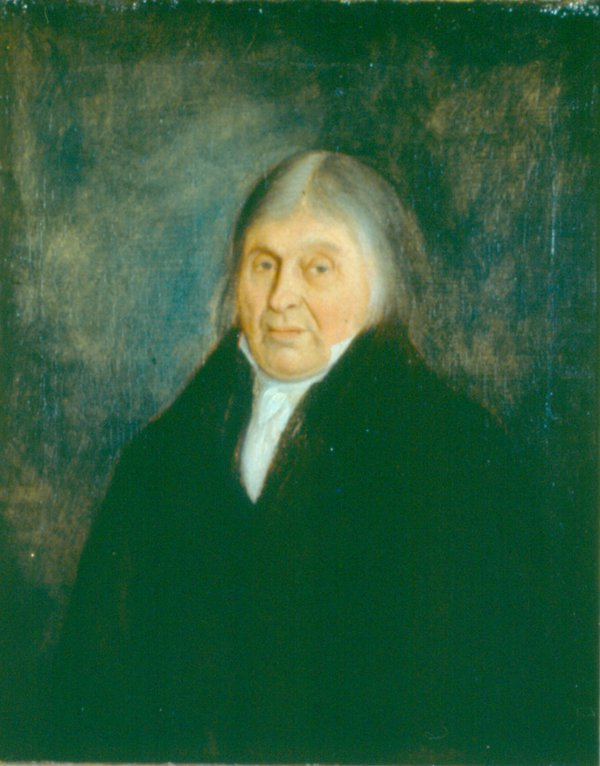
Franz Anton Xaverius Ries

Franz Anton Xaverius Ries (10 November 1755 – 1 November 1846) was a German violinist. His father, Johann Ries (1723–1784), was court trumpeter to the Elector of Cologne in Bonn.

Ries was born in Bonn, and studied under J.P. Salomon. He was a child prodigy, and was concertmaster of the Kurfürstlichen Hoforchester in Vienna. He spent most of his life in Bonn, though he had success in his early years in Vienna as both a solo violinist and in quartets. One of his students in Bonn was the young Beethoven. He was given an appointment by Elector Maximilian in 1779, which he kept until the court's dissolution in 1794.

After this he continued teaching; he was awarded an Order of the Red Eagle and an honorary doctorate from Bonn University. He died in Godesberg.

Two of his sons, Ferdinand and Hubert, became well-known composers in their own right.
