= Ferdinand Ries =

German composer (1784–1838)

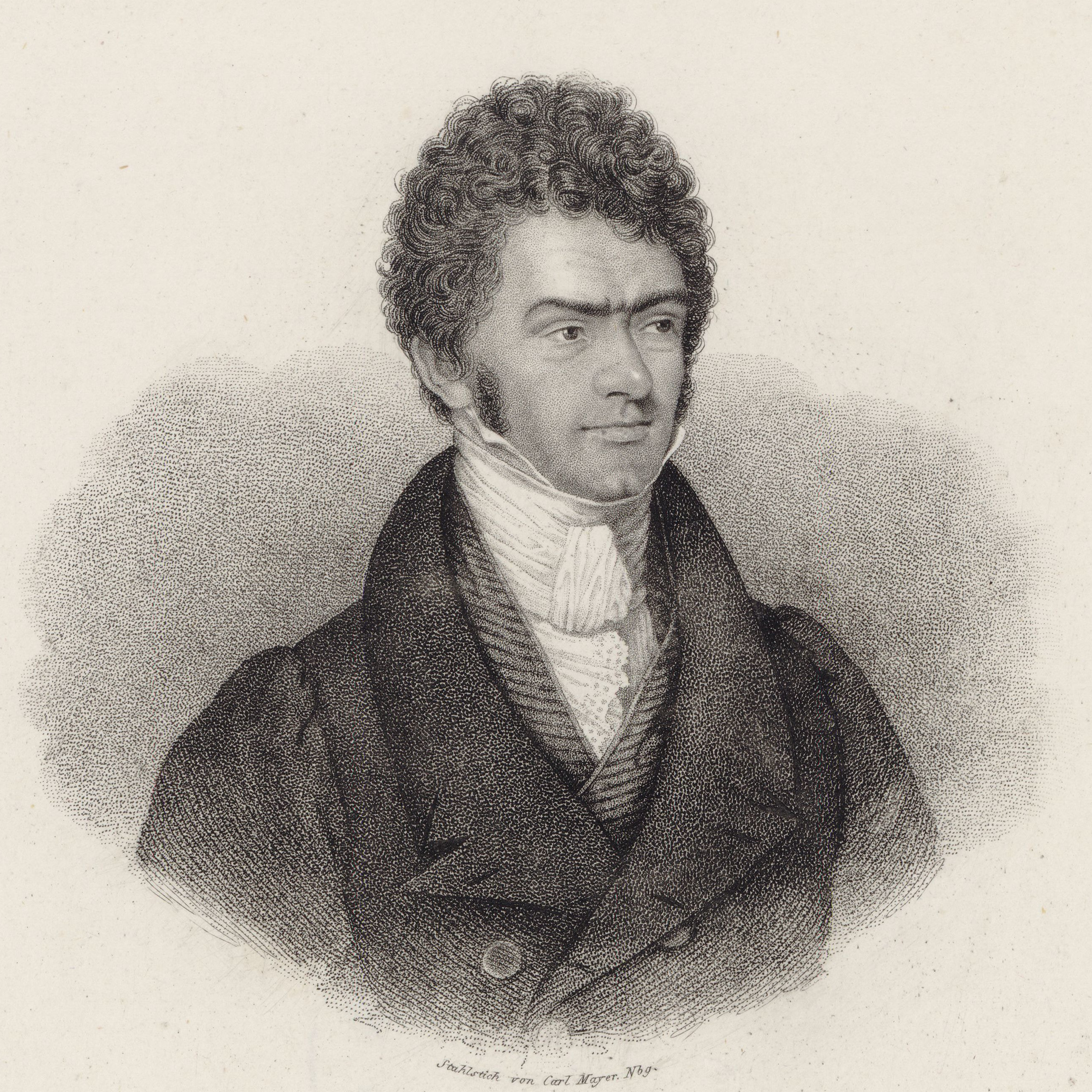
- Ferdinand Ries
- Born: Bonn
- Baptised: 28 November 1784
- Died: 13 January 1838 (aged 53); Frankfurt
- Occupations: Pianist; Conductor; Piano teacher

Ferdinand Ries (baptised 28 November 1784 – 13 January 1838) was a German composer. Ries was a friend, pupil and secretary of Ludwig van Beethoven. He composed eight symphonies, a violin concerto, nine piano concertos (the first concerto is not published), three operas, and numerous other works, including 26 string quartets. In 1838 he published a collection of reminiscences of his teacher Beethoven, co-written with Beethoven's friend, Franz Wegeler. Ries' symphonies, some chamber works—most of them with piano—his violin concerto and his piano concertos have been recorded, exhibiting a style which, given his connection to Beethoven, lies between the Classical and early Romantic styles.

== Early life ==
Ries was born into a musical family of Bonn. His grandfather, Johann Ries (1723–1784), was appointed court trumpeter to the Elector of Cologne at Bonn. Ries was the eldest son of the violinist and Archbishopric Music Director Franz Anton Ries (1755–1846) and the brother of violinist and composer (Pieter) Hubert Ries (1802–1886) and violinist Joseph Ries. He received piano lessons from his father and was instructed by Bernhard Romberg, who also belonged to the Bonn Hofkapelle as a cellist. At the end of 1798 he went for further training in Arnsberg to meet an organist friend of his father; a year later he went to Munich. There he worked hard as a music copyist.

The French dissolved the Electoral court of Bonn and disbanded its orchestra, but in the early months of 1803 the penniless Ries managed to reach Vienna, with a letter of introduction written by the Munich-based composer Carl Cannabich on 29 December 1802. Ries was then the pupil of Ludwig van Beethoven, who had received some early instruction at Bonn from Ries's father, Franz Ries. Together with Carl Czerny, Ries was the only pupil whom Beethoven taught during these years. Beethoven took great care of the young man, teaching him piano, sending him to Albrechtsberger for harmony and composition and securing for him positions as piano tutor in aristocratic households in Baden and Silesia. Ries was soon also Beethoven's secretary: he had correspondence with publishers, copied notes, completed errands and provided Beethoven the beautiful apartment in the Pasqualati House where the composer lived for several years. Ries made his public debut as a pianist in July 1804, playing Beethoven's C minor concerto, Op. 37, with his own cadenza, which he was allowed to write. His performance received glowing reviews. Ries spent the summers of 1803 and 1804 with Beethoven in Baden bei Wien, as well as in Döbling.

Ries' work as a secretary and a copyist won Beethoven's confidence in negotiations with publishers and he became a fast friend. One of the most famous stories told about Ries is connected with the first rehearsal of the Eroica Symphony, when Ries, during the performance, mistakenly believed that the horn player had come in too early and said so aloud, infuriating Beethoven. (Note: Told by Ries himself in his Biographical Reminiscences of Beethoven, co-authored with Wegeler. See: Ries, Ferdinand; Wegeler, Franz Gerhard; Kalischer, Alfred Christlieb (1906). Biographische notizen über Ludwig van Beethoven. Schuster & Loeffler. p. 94. (German).)

Ries feared conscription in the occupying French army (though he was blind in one eye) and so he fled Vienna in September 1805. He stayed in Bonn for a year with his family, and this is where he wrote his first piano concerto in C major, now known as Concerto no. 6 for piano and orchestra. While Ries was living in Bonn, his two piano sonatas, op. 1, dedicated to Beethoven were published by Simrock.

Starting in 1807, Ries spent the next two years in Paris before returning to Vienna. Here Ries quickly expanded his catalogue of works (mainly to chamber and piano music, such as the later popular Septet op. 25). Ries had great difficulty succeeding in the capital city of the French Army and was at times so discouraged that he wanted to give up the profession of music and seek a position in the civil service.

On 27 August 1808, Ries arrived back in Vienna, where he again made contact with Beethoven. Ries helped Beethoven with the premieres of the Fifth and Sixth Symphonies and other works for the benefit concert held on 22 December 1808. In July 1809, Ries left Vienna for the second time; this time he was threatened by the call-up to the Austrian military, which mobilized all forces against the threat to Vienna by Napoleon. Again he took refuge in his paternal home of Bonn and spent the next one and a half years composing a series of larger works: his first Symphony, his second Piano Concerto in C minor (later known as Concerto no. 4 op. 115) and his Violin Concerto (unpublished during his lifetime) in E minor op. 24.

== Later life ==
In January 1811, Ries left for Russia with the goal of an extended concert trip via Kassel, Hamburg, Copenhagen, Stockholm to St. Petersburg. There, he met his old teacher Bernhard Romberg, with whom he played concerts in Western Russia. He composed two piano concertos for this tour, No. 2 in E♭ major, op. 42 and No. 3 in C♯ minor, op. 55. However, in the summer of 1812, with Napoleon advancing on Moscow, Ries left Russia to tour across Europe, arriving in London in April 1813.

The composer's next eleven years were spent in England. Johann Peter Salomon, a friend and patron of Haydn—who had formerly played with Franz Anton Ries in the court orchestra at Bonn—included Ries regularly in his Philharmonic concert series, (Note: Ries debuted 14 March 1814.) where a review praised his "romantic wildness". In London too, Ries established himself as a respected piano teacher in the wealthy districts of the city and in 1814 he married Harriet Mangeon (1796–1863), from an opulent family. In 1815 he became a member of the Philharmonic Society and in the same year was elected to be one of its directors. In 1818 he was a founding member of the Regent’s Harmonic Institution; a music publishing firm established with the intent of raising funds for the Philharmonic Society and its restoration of the Argyll Rooms. Ries never lost touch with Beethoven and had a role in the London publications of many works of Beethoven after the peace of 1815, including the 1822 commission from the Philharmonic Society that resulted in the Choral Symphony.

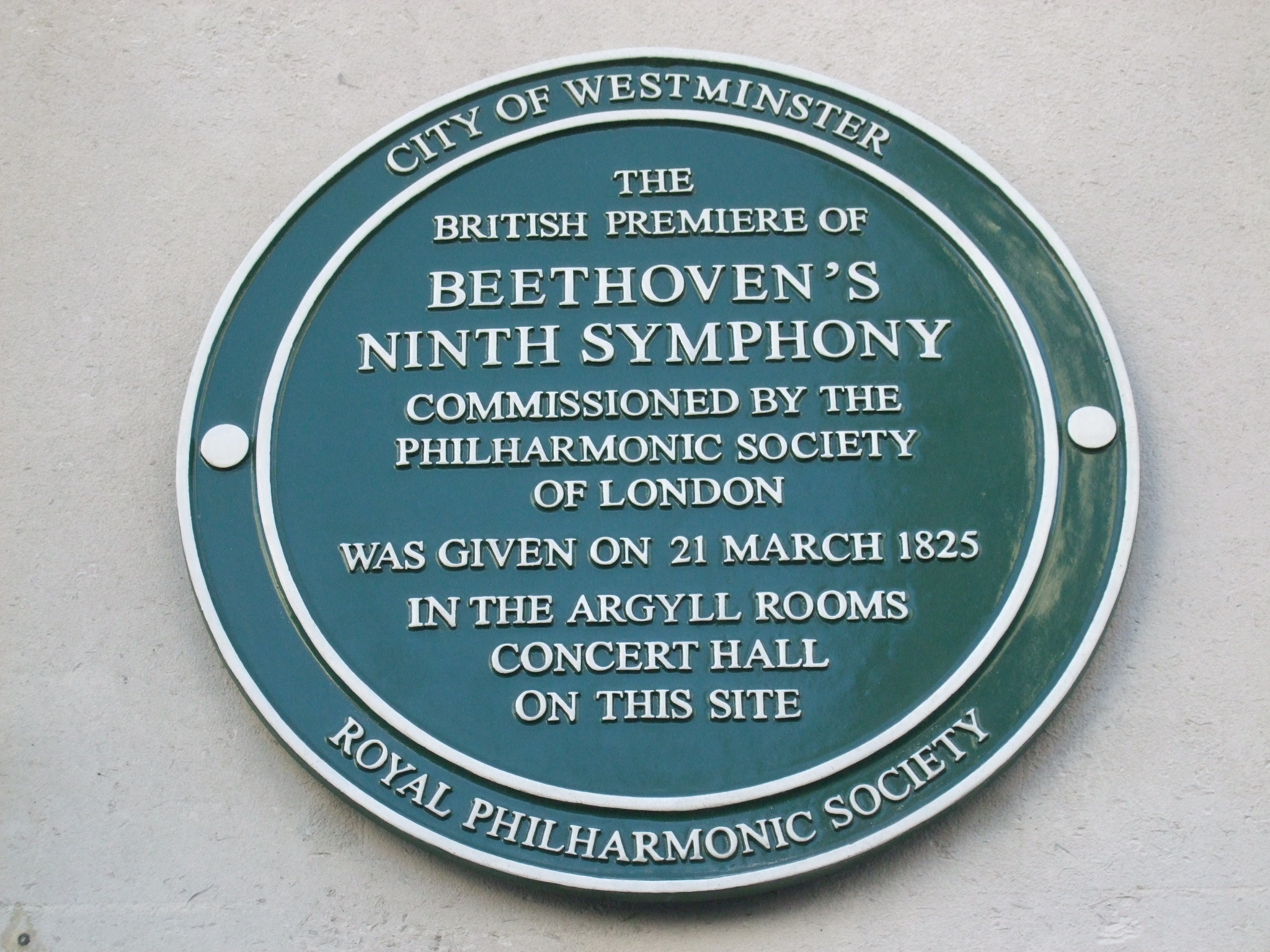
Commemorative plaque of the London premiere of Beethoven's 9th symphony, commissioned by Ries

Ries wrote his Symphony No. 2 in D minor (numbered as no. 5), inspired by the quality of the Orchestra of the Philharmonic Society. His compositional work is effectively split in two at this time. Ries composed most of his orchestral works during his time in London: six of his eight symphonies (as well as two of his five concert overtures) were created for concerts of the Philharmonic Society. On the other hand, he wrote now increasingly light fare for the piano: fantasies, rondos, variations, adapted divertimentos and others, mostly about well-known opera arias or popular folk song melodies. The production of chamber music (string quartets, violin sonatas) and intermediate piano music (sonatas) came almost to a standstill. After 1820, he had disagreements with his fellow directors of the Philharmonic Society; Ries was of the opinion that his works were not adequately taken into account in the programming of concerts. In 1821, he resigned his position of Director and began to increase his contacts with continental Europe with the idea of a return. On 3 May 1824, he gave his farewell concert in London, at which he dedicated a Piano Concerto (Concerto no. 7 in A minor for piano and orchestra op. 132).

In July 1824, Ries retired to Germany with his English wife and three children, but returned to musical life in Frankfurt am Main as composer and conductor. His reputation as an instrumental composer and bandleader had strengthened now in Central Europe. In 1834 he was appointed head of the city orchestra and Singakademie in Aachen, for which he wrote two oratorios, Der Sieg des Glaubens (1829) and Die Könige in Israel (1837), both of which have been recorded. In addition, he was festival director of the Lower Rhenish Music Festival eight times — between 1824 and 1837. During his first year as director of the festival, Ries conducted the German premiere of Beethoven's 9th Symphony. In Godesburg during 1825 and 1826, Ries wrote five string quartets (op. 150, no. 1–2; op. 166, no. 1; WoO 34 and 36).

Beginning in April 1827, the Ries family moved to Frankfurt am Main. In Frankfurt, the existence of a renowned Opera House attracted him. Since 1826, he had had plans to write operas, which he brought to fruition in the years 1827/28. On 15 October 1828, his first opera, The Robber Bride, was premiered in Frankfurt with great success. To the direction of the Dublin Music Festival in 1831 he used a month's stay in London, where he composed his second opera, The Sorceress (published in Germany under the title Liska or the Witch by Gyllensteen). It was premiered on 4 August 1831 at the London Royal Adelphi Theatre. His third opera was composed in 1834 (Die Nacht auf dem Libanon WoO 51), which for many years remained unperformed. In 1832/33 Ries and his wife made a several-month journey through Italy for a concert tour (which would be his last), with concerts in Venice, Milan, Rome and Naples. During the trip, Ries wrote his final Piano Concerto (in G minor op. 177), his final Piano Sonata (A♭ major op. 176) and his final String Quartet (F minor WoO 48, during his lifetime, unpublished). In the summer of 1834, Ries was briefly Director of the Aachen Theatre Orchestra in conversation; but he rejected the offer. During the winter of 1836-37 Ries visited Paris; while there, he composed his last work for orchestra (the overture dramatique L'apparition WoO 61) and briefly went to London, where he succeeded in the world premiere of his new overture in a concert of the Philharmonic Society on 13 March 1837. Ries returned to Frankfurt where he died on 13 January 1838, after a short and unexpected illness. When Ries died, he was so forgotten that no leading music magazine wrote an obituary for him.

Ferdinand Ries is buried in the Tomb (No. 45) of the Klotz family in the Frankfurt am Main cemetery.

== The music ==
Cecil Hill wrote a scholarly thematic catalog, listed below, of Ries's 300 works: for each work he provided incipits (opening themes) for each movement, dedications, known early reviews, and known dates of composition.

While one of the few widely circulated recordings of Ries's music was for some time that of his third piano concerto, now all of his symphonies, the other concertos, and a number of chamber works are available on compact disc, and his surviving music for piano and orchestra and chamber works are the focus of ongoing projects on various record labels as well.

== Selected list of works ==
=== Operas ===
- Die Räuberbraut, opera in three acts op. 156 (1827/28; 1830/31)
- Liska, oder die Hexe von Gyllensteen, opera in two acts op. 164 (1831); premiered in London as The Sorceress
- Die Nacht auf dem Libanon, Romantische Oper in three acts WoO. 51 (1834–38)

=== Other Works for Voice ===
- Der Morgen, Cantata for four voices and orchestra op. 27 (1806)
- Iphigenia in Aulis; Scene for a voice and orchestra WoO 17 (1810)
- Requiem in C minor (1815, unfinished)

=== Melodrama ===
- Die Zigeunerin, melodrama in two acts WoO. 53 (1835)

=== Symphonies ===
- No. 1 in D major, op. 23 (1809)
- No. 2 in C minor, op. 80 (1814)
- No. 3 in E♭ major, op. 90 (1816)
- No. 4 in F major, op. 110 (1818)
- No. 5 in D minor, op. 112 (1813)
- Symphony (unpublished, sometimes known as No. 8) in E♭ major, WoO. 30 (1822) (Note: Hill (1982): xxviii asserts this work was written before op. 146)
- No. 6 in D major, op. 146 (1822, last movement revised in 1826)
- No. 7 in A minor, op. 181 (1835)

=== Concertos ===
- Concerto for 2 Horns in F major WoO. 19 (1811)
- Concerto No. 1 for Violin and Orchestra in E minor op. 24 (1810) (Note: Note that, unusually, Ries and/or his publishers did not separate the numbering scheme of his violin concerto from his piano concertos; thus, there is no "Piano Concerto No. 1".)
- Concerto No. 2 for Piano and Orchestra in E♭ major op. 42 (1808; pub. 1812)
- Concerto No. 3 for Piano and Orchestra in C♯ minor, op. 55 (1812; pub. 1815)
- Concerto No. 4 for Piano and Orchestra in C minor, op. 115 (1809, pub. 1823)
- Concerto No. 5 for Piano and Orchestra in D major, op. 120 'Concerto Pastoral' (c.1816; pub. 1823)
- Concerto No. 6 for Piano and Orchestra in C major, op. 123 (1806; pub. 1824)
- Concerto No. 7 for Piano and Orchestra in A minor, op. 132 'Abschieds-Concert von England' (1823; pub. 1824)
- Concerto No. 8 for Piano and Orchestra in A♭ major, op. 151 'Gruss an den Rhein' (1826; pub. 1827)
- Concerto No. 9 for Piano and Orchestra in G minor, op. 177 (1832/33)

=== Concert overtures ===
- Ouvertüre zu Schillers Trauerspiel Don Carlos op. 94 (1815)
- Ouverture bardique WoO 24 (1815)
- Ouvertüre zu Schillers Trauerspiel Die Braut von Messina op. 162 (1829)
- Große Fest-Ouvertüre und Siegesmarsch op. 172 (1831/32)
- Dramatische Ouvertüre L’Apparition WoO 61 (1836)

=== Other works for piano and orchestra ===
- Swedish National Airs with Variations, Op. 52 (1812)
- Grand Variations on 'Rule, Britannia', Op. 116 (1817)
- Introduction et Variations Brillantes, Op. 170 (sometime between 1813 and 1824, pub. 1832)
- Introduction et Rondeau Brillant, Op. 144 (1825)
- Introduction and Polonaise, Op. 174 (1833)
- Introduction et Rondeau Brillant, WoO. 54 (1835)
- Concertino for Piano and Orchestra, WoO. 88 (1836, lost)

=== Oratorios ===
- Der Sieg des Glaubens, op. 157 (1829)
- Die Könige in Israel, op. 186 (1837)

=== Chamber music ===
- Cello Sonata in C minor, WoO. 2 (1799)
- Violin Sonata in A♭ major, WoO. 5 (1800)
- Violin Sonata in E♭ major, WoO. 7 (1804)
- String Quartet in F minor, WoO. 48 (1833–35)
- Nocturne for Wind Sextet, WoO. 50 (Flute, 2 Clarinets, Horn, 2 Bassoons, 1834)
- Nocturne for Wind Sextet, WoO. 60 (Flute, 2 Clarinets, Horn, 2 Bassoons, 1836)
- Piano Trio in E♭ major, op. 2
- 2 Violin Sonatas op. 8
- Violin Sonata in B♭ major, op. 10 (1808, pub. 1810)
- Octet in F major, op. 12 (1808)
- Piano Quartet in F minor, op. 13 (1809)
- Violin Sonata in E♭ major, op. 18 (1810)
- Violin Sonata in F minor, op. 19 (1810)
- Cello Sonata in C major, op. 20
- Cello Sonata in A major, op. 21
- Grand Septuor in E♭ major for piano, clarinet, 2 horns, violin, cello and double bass, op. 25 (1812)
- Clarinet Trio in B♭ major, op. 28 (1809)
- Clarinet Sonata in G minor, op. 29 (1808)
- 3 Violin Sonatas, op. 30 (1811)
- Horn Sonata in F major, op. 34 (1811)
- Flute Trio in E♭ major, op. 63 (1815)
- 3 String Quartets, op. 70 (1812, rewritten 1815)
- Quintet in B minor for piano, violin, viola, cello, and double bass, op. 74 (1815)
- Violin Sonata in D major, op. 83 (1808, pub. 1818)
- Romance for cello & pianoforte in G major (arrangement of the 2nd mvt. of piano sonata, op. 86/2) (1819)
- Flute Sonata in G major, op. 87
- Grand Sextuor for 2 violins, viola, cello, double bass & piano in C major, op.100
- Introduction and a Russian Dance for the Piano Forte and Violoncello in E♭ major, op. 113/1 (1823)
- Introduction & Polonaise for piano and flute, op. 119
- Cello Sonata in G minor, op. 125
- Grand Otetto in A♭ major for piano, violin, viola, clarinet, horn, bassoon, cello and double bass, op. 128 (1816, pub. 1831)
- Piano Quartet No.3 in E minor, op. 129 (London 1820 or 1822)
- Sextet in G minor for harp, piano, clarinet, bassoon, horn and double bass, op. 142 (1814)
- Piano Trio in C minor, op. 143
- Flute Quartets Nos. 1-3, op. 145
- Variations on a Portuguese Hymn for piano and flute, op. 152/1 (1826)
- Flute Sonata in E♭ major, Sonate sentimentale, op. 169 (1814)

=== Piano music ===
- Piano Sonata in C major, op. 1 no. 1 (1806)
- Piano Sonata in A minor, op. 1 no. 2 (1803-4)
- 2 Piano Sonatinas, op. 5
- Sonatina for Piano Four Hands, op. 6
- Grande Sonate in D major, op. 9 no. 1
- Grande Sonata Fantaisie in F♯ minor, 'L'Infortune' op. 26
- 2 Piano Sonatas, op.11
- Piano Sonata in A minor op.45
- The Dream, Op. 49
