= Cello Sonata No. 2 (Ries) =

Ferdinand Ries composed his Cello Sonata No. 2 in C major, Op. 20 in 1808, along with the A major, Op. 21 sonata while resident in Paris. However it was not until 1810 that the two works were published by Simrock with dedications to the cellist Bernhard Romberg.

== Structure ==
The sonata is in three movements:

1. Allegro con brio
2. Adagio –
3. Polonaise: Allegretto moderato

Cole Tutino, in their thesis, notes that, while the dedication states that this sonata and the Op. 21 sonata published with it were both "...written for and dedicated to Berhard Romberg..." and thus that Ries probably expected Romberg to take them into his repertoire, the sonata was not written as a virtuoso showpiece, but rather a work incorporating playing techniques favored by Romberg that could be played by skilled amateurs, a fact pointed out in a review of the two sonatas published in the Allgemeine musikalische Zeitung, shortly after they were published.

Tutino further speculates that Ries's incorporation of a polonaise movement in the sonata may have been inspired by Beethoven's use of a polonaise in his Triple Concerto in C major, Op. 56.
