= Cello Sonata No. 3 (Ries) =

Ferdinand Ries composed his Cello Sonata No. 3 in A major, Op. 21 in 1808, along with the C major, Op. 20 sonata while resident in Paris. However it was not until 1810 that the two works were published by Simrock with dedications to the cellist Bernhard Romberg.

== Structure ==
The sonata is structured in four movements:

1. Allegro
2. Andantino quasi Allegro
3. Menuetto: Allegretto
4. Rondo: Allegro ma non troppo

A typical performance should take around 25 – 27 minutes.

Bert Hagels in his notes speculates that when Ries composed this sonata he was influenced in some way by Beethoven's Op. 69 cello sonata which was in the same key and was being composed around the same time as Ries was working on this sonata, citing common stylistic elements in the opening movement as evidence. Cole Tutino in his thesis disagrees with this assessment, but does note that this may be one of the first Romantic compositions to make use of a major key to minor key tonal structure. (Note: The sonata starts in A major and ends in A minor.) He further comments, that while not composed as a virtuoso display piece, the sonata along with the C major sonata published alongside it nevertheless make use of techniques that Bernhard Romberg was well known for and were probably aimed at the skilled amateur player.
