= Bernhard Romberg =

German cellist and composer (1767–1841)

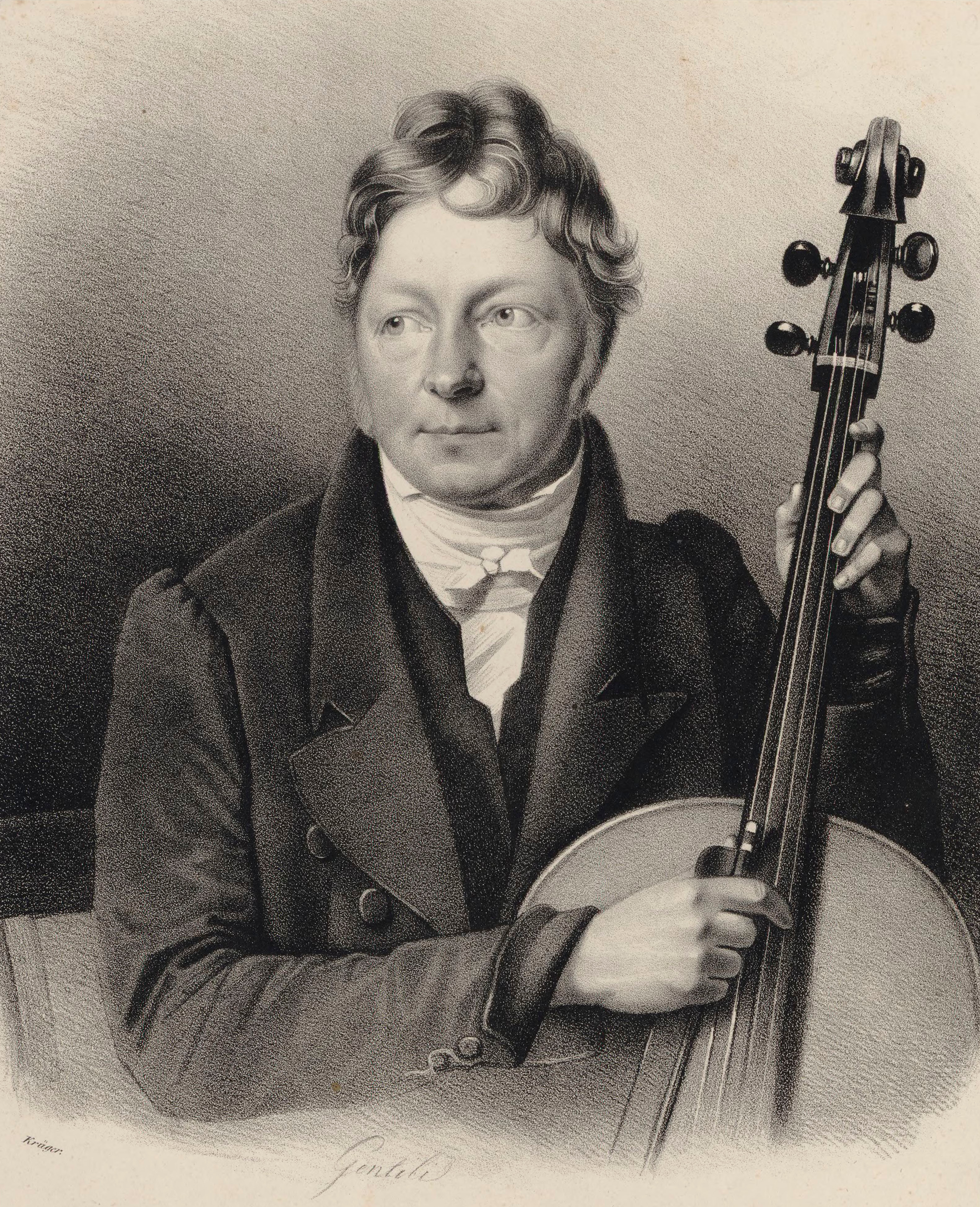
Portrait of Bernhard Romberg (1815)

Bernhard Heinrich Romberg (November 13, 1767 – August 13, 1841) was a German cellist and composer.

== Life ==
Romberg was born in Dinklage. His father, Anton Romberg, played the bassoon and cello and gave Bernhard his first cello lessons. He first performed in public at the age of seven. In addition to touring Europe with his cousin Andreas Romberg, Bernhard Romberg also joined the Münster Court Orchestra.

Together with his cousin, he later joined the court orchestra of the Prince Elector Archbishop of Cologne in Bonn (conducted by the Kapellmeister Andrea Luchesi) in 1790, where they met the young Beethoven. Beethoven admired and respected Bernhard Romberg as a musician.

Romberg made several innovations in cello design and performance. He lengthened the cello's fingerboard and flattened the side under the C string, thus giving it more freedom to vibrate. He also invented what is known as the Romberg bevel, a flat section beneath the E string of the double bass that allowed the larger string to vibrate more freely. He suggested that half-size and 3/4 size cellos should be designed to make it easier for young children to play the instrument. Romberg is responsible for simplifying cello notation to only three clefs, the bass clef, the tenor clef and the treble clef. Until his time, it was common to use many clefs for multiple uses; the 18th century cellist-composer Luigi Boccherini used as many as six clefs in his compositions. Romberg is thought to be among the first cellists to perform from memory, which was a skill praised highly in his day. He died in Hamburg.

It has been suggested that Romberg's cello sonata in E minor was a strong influence on the first cello sonata in E minor by Johannes Brahms.

== Works ==
Flute Quintet in G major
I. Allegro

II. Minuet

III. Adagio

IV. Rondo
Performed by James Galway and the Young Danish String Quartet

=== Works with Opus number ===
- Op. 1, String Quartets Nos. 1–3
  - String Quartet No. 1 in E♭ major
  - String Quartet No. 2 in B♭ major
  - String Quartet No. 3 in D major
- Op. 2, Concerto No. 1 in B♭ major, for cello and orchestra
- Op. 3, Grand Concerto No. 2 in D major, for cello with orchestra
- Op. 4, Potpourris in G major for cello and string quartet (Also transcribed as Three Duos for violin and cello)
- Op. 5, Three Sonatas for cello (or violin) and harp (or piano)
- Op. 6, Concerto No. 3 in G major, for cello and orchestra (also reduced as Three Grand Sonatas, for piano with accompaniment of violin)
- Op. 7, Cello Concerto No.4 in E minor
- Op. 8, Grand Trio in F major for string trio
- Op. 9, 3 duos for 2 cellos (also transcribed for violin and cello)
  - No. 1, Duet in D major
  - No. 2, Duet in F major
  - No. 3, Duet in E minor
- Op. 10, Fantaisie for cello, 2 violins, viola, bass, flute, oboe, clarinet and bassoon, Berlin: Bureau de Musique de Rodolphe werckmeister, c.1806.
- Op. 11, Overture for orchestra
- Op. 12, Quartet No.4 (2 violins, viola, cello)
- Op. 13, Variations in A minor for cello and orchestra
- Op. 14, Airs Russes for cello and orchestra
- Op. 17, Flute concerto in B minor (Also published as Op. 30)
- Op. 18, Variations et Rondo in E♭ major for harp (or piano), violin, viola and cello
- Op. 20, Variations sur deux airs russes in D minor for cello and strings
- Op. 21, Rondoletto per violoncello principale con strings in A major
- Op. 22, Piano Quartet
- Op. 23, Trauer-Symphonie in C minor
- Op. 24, Divertimento for cello, violin, viola and bass, Bonn: Simrock, c. 1830.
- Op. 25, String Quartets Nos. 5–7
  - String Quartet No. 5 in G minor
  - String Quartet No. 6 in C minor
  - String Quartet No. 7 in G major
- Op. 26, Overture to Opera: Ulysse et Circe
- Op. 27, Divertimento sopra un tema finlandico et sueco for flute, 2 violins, viola and cello
- Op. 28, Capriccio sur des aire nationaux suédois for cello and piano (also Symphony in E♭ major)
- Op. 30, Concerto No. 5 in F♯ minor for cello and orchestra
- Op. 31, Concerto No. 6 in F major (Militaire) for cello and orchestra
- Op. 33, 2 duos for 2 cellos
- Op. 34, Concert Overture
- Op. 35, Elegie sur la mort d'un objet chéri for cello and string orchestra
- Op. 36, Duos for 2 cellos
- Op. 37, String Quartet No. 8 in A major
- Op. 38, Three Sonatas for Cello and Piano (also Three Trios for viola and two cellos)
  - No. 1, Cello Sonata in E minor
  - No. 2, Cello Sonata in G major
  - No. 3, Cello Sonata in B♭ major
- Op. 39, String Quartet No. 9 in D minor
- Op. 41, Concertino in E minor for cello and orchestra
- Op. 42, Divertimento on Swedish National Themes
- Op. 43, 3 Sonatas (Also played as trios for viola, cello and bass). (and as duos for 2 cellos).
  - No. 1, Cello Sonata in B♭ major
  - No. 2, Cello Sonata in C major
  - No. 3, Cello Sonata in G major
- Op. 44, Concerto No. 7 in C major (Suisse) for cello and orchestra
- Op. 46, Divertimento from Austrian Folksongs for cello and guitar
- Op. 48, Concerto No. 8 in A major (Brillant) for cello and orchestra
- Op. 49, Souvenir de Vienne, grosses rondo brillant, for cello and piano (originally with orchestra)
- Op. 50, Theme and Variations for cello and piano
- Op. 51, Concertino, for cello and piano or orchestra in D minor
- Op. 52, – Airs Russes for cello and piano
- Op. 53, Symphony in C major (published 1830 by Haslinger)
- Op. 55, Fantaisie sur des airs norvégiens in D minor for cello and piano
- Op. 56 , Concerto No. 9 in B minor (Grand) for cello and orchestra
- Op. 57, Concertino for cello and orchestra
- Op. 58, Fantaisie sur des airs norvégiens pour violoncelle et piano
- Op. 59, String Quartet No. 10 in A minor
- Op. 60, String Quartet No. 11 in E major
- Op. 61, Theme with Variations and Rondo for cello and piano
- Op. 62, Symphonie burlesque (toy symphony)
- Op. 65, Divertimento on Westphalian National Themes for cello and string quartet
- Op. 70, Grande fantaisie for cello accompanied by string quartet or piano
- Op. 71, Divertissement for piano trio
- Op. 72, Concertino in A for two cellos and orchestra
- Op. 75, Concerto No. 10 in E major (Brillant), for cello and orchestra
- Op. 76, Introduction and Polonaise for cello and piano

=== Works by Bernhard and Andreas Romberg ===
- Op. 1, Three Quintets for flute, violin, two violas and cello
  - Quintet No. 1 in D major
  - Quintet No. 2 in C major
  - Quintet No. 3 in G major (written only by Bernhard Romberg)
- Op. 2, 3 Concertante Duos for violin and cello

=== Works without Opus number ===
- Oeuvres Posthumes, 6 Morceaux Élégants for cello and piano
  - No. 1, La réponse, Fantaisie
  - No. 2, Divertissement
  - No. 3, Notturno
  - No. 4, Sérénade
  - No. 5, Bagatella
  - No. 6, Introduzione e Rondo giocoso
- Le Rêve, pièce de fantaisie for cello and string quartet (or piano)
- Two Canons
- Recitative and Aria in B♭ major for cello and orchestra
- Pièce pour les amateurs sur des airs suedois for cello and string quartet
- Cantabile et thème varié suivis d'un allegretto for cello and piano
- Variations in A minor for cello and orchestra
- Variations in E major for cello and piano
- Trois themes de W. A. Mozart, variés pour violon et violoncelle
- Double Concerto, for violin, cello, and orchestra
- Divertimento sur des airs autrichiens, for cello and piano
- Violoncello studies, three books
- A Complete Theoretical and Practical School for the Violoncello
