= Frieda Kwast-Hodapp =

German pianist (1880–1949)

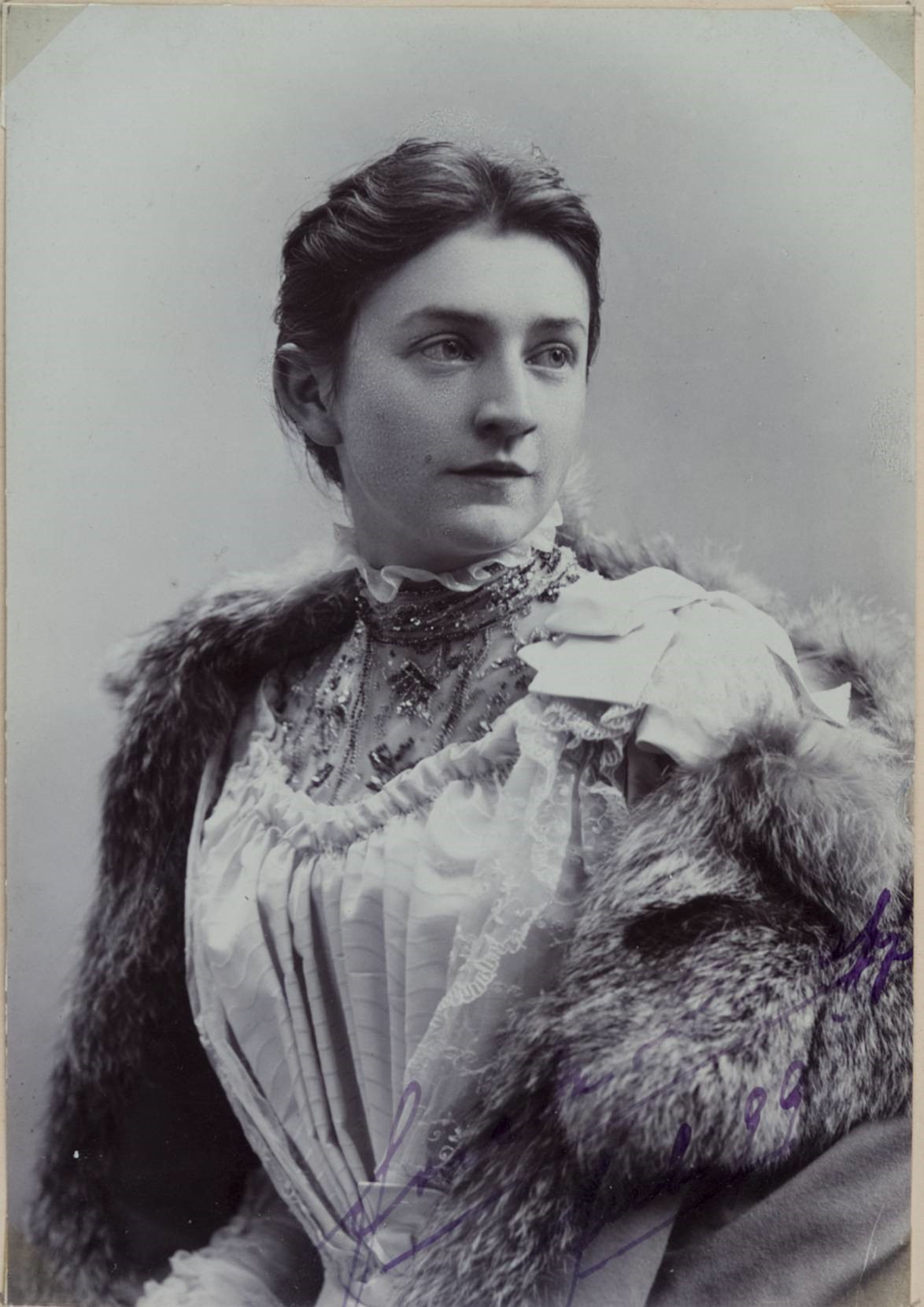
- Frieda Kwast-Hodapp in 1900
- Born: Frieda Elise Hodapp; 13 August 1880; Bargen, German Empire
- Died: 14 September 1949 (aged 69); Bad Wiessee, Germany
- Other names: Qwast-Hodapp, Frieda Krebs
- Education: • Grand Duke's Conservatory, Karlsruhe; • Hoch Conservatory, Frankfurt
- Occupations: • Classical pianist; • Piano teacher
- Organizations: • Stern Conservatory (1905–1914, 1927–1931); • Municipal College of Music and Theater, Mannheim (1923/1924); • Heidelberg University (1943–1945)
- Spouses: • James Kwast (m. 1902–1927; his death); • Otto Krebs (m. 1941–1941); his death

Frieda Kwast-Hodapp (born Hodapp; 13 August 1880 – 14 September 1949) was a German classical pianist whose career spanned the transition from late Romanticism to modernism. Celebrated by contemporaries as a first-rank pianist, she was a preferred soloist for conductors such as Arthur Nikisch and Wilhelm Furtwängler.

A student of James Kwast, whom she later married, Kwast-Hodapp established her reputation as an interpreter of Ludwig van Beethoven and Johannes Brahms while also becoming a pioneering advocate for contemporary music. She notably premiered Max Reger's Piano Concerto in 1910 and his Variations and Fugue on a Theme by G. Ph. Telemann in 1915, as well as Wolfgang Fortner's Piano Concerto in 1943, and influenced Ferruccio Busoni's 1922 revision of his Variationen über ein Präludium von Chopin.

After a significant withdrawal from public life while living at Holzdorf Estate and Heidelberg with her second husband, Otto Krebs, she resumed her career in the 1940s.

Her late-career legacy is preserved through a series of 1948 radio broadcasts for RIAS and other German stations, documenting her interpretations shortly before her death. Her artistic contributions have been re-evaluated in the 21st century through the restoration and digital release of her piano rolls and radio recordings, which confirm that Kwast-Hodapp was celebrated as one of the most significant pianists of her time.

== Family and education ==
Frieda Elise Hodapp was born on 13 August 1880, in Bargen, now part of the Black Forest town of Engen. She was the eldest of thirteen children born to the village schoolteacher Anton Hodapp and his wife, Maria; four of her siblings died in infancy. In her early years, the family moved to Karlsruhe, where her father pursued further pedagogical training with a "very small" scholarship from the Grand Duchy of Baden, (Note: Original German: ... nach Karlsruhe über, da der Vater ein – sehr geringes – Stipendium bekam, um eine Zusatzausbildung zu absolvieren ...) with the aim of overcoming the omnipresent "bitter poverty" of the time, as biographer Horst Ferdinand noted in the Baden Biographies. (Note: Original German: Als Ältestes ... wurde sie in bittere Armut hineingeboren; ...) The family later settled in Schonach, where Anton Hodapp was appointed "head teacher". As a gifted musician, he directed the local church choir and was later named parish organist by the Archdiocese of Freiburg.

=== Musical education and early performances ===
At the age of four, Frieda Hodapp began her musical training under her father's tutelage. (Note: Original German: Der Vater erteilte der Vierjährigen, deren musikalisches Talent früh hervortrat, ersten Klavierunterricht ...) Recognising her "perfect pitch", (Note: Original German: Da ich alles sofort auswendig sang und das absolute Gehör zeigte, beschloß er, mich Musik lernen zu lassen.) he bought her a "square piano" from the Stuttgart-based manufacturer Lipp. (Note: Original German: Es wurde ein besseres Tafelklavier von Lipp angeschaff ...) Frieda later described his teaching methods as strict; nevertheless, she attributed her "overseeing" and "rapid grasp" of musical concepts, as well as her exceptional sight-reading abilities, to him. (Note: Original German: Mein Vater legte mir die schwierigsten Stücke vor. Ich mußte sie abspielen. Er selbst stand hinter mir und schlug den Takt mit einem Stück Holz auf die Lehne meines Stuhles. Wehe, wenn ich gezögert hätte oder das Spiel unterbrochen. So lernte ich rasch überblicken und schnell erfassen.) At six, she gave her first concert in a "Schonach inn" (Gasthaus). (Note: Original German: Mit sechs Jahren spielte sie erstmals in einem Schonacher Gasthaus vor.)

In her 1934 autobiography, only excerpts of which are published, Kwast-Hodapp recalled the family's continued precarious financial situation in her youth and a particular incident. When a bailiff appeared to seize assets, she played for him on the Lipp piano. Moved by her talent, the official opted not to seize the instrument and even "donated" her a few pennies. (Note: Original German: Da die Anschaffungen des Instrumentes und der Noten weit über die Verhältnisse der Eltern gingen, kamen große Bedrängnisse, die ich mit erleiden mußte. Eines Tages erschien der Gerichtsvollzieher und wollte das Klavier abholen. In der Not sagte mein Vater, ich solle diesem Manne etwas vorspielen. Ich tat es und der Beamte war so gerührt, daß er uns nicht nur das so gut verteidigte Klavier beließ, sondern mir noch 30 Pfennige schenkte.)

=== Training in Karlsruhe and royal patronage (1887–1891) ===
In 1887, at the age of seven, Hodapp was taken to Karlsruhe to perform at the Grand Duke's Conservatory of music (Großherzogliches Konservatorium). Following a successful audition, she was admitted by the director, Court Concertmaster Carl Will, as a "scholarship student" (Freischülerin), and placed "under the care" of an elderly lady. (Note: Original German: ... als Freischülerin in die Musikschule aufgenommen ... Will gab Frieda in die Obhut einer älteren Dame)

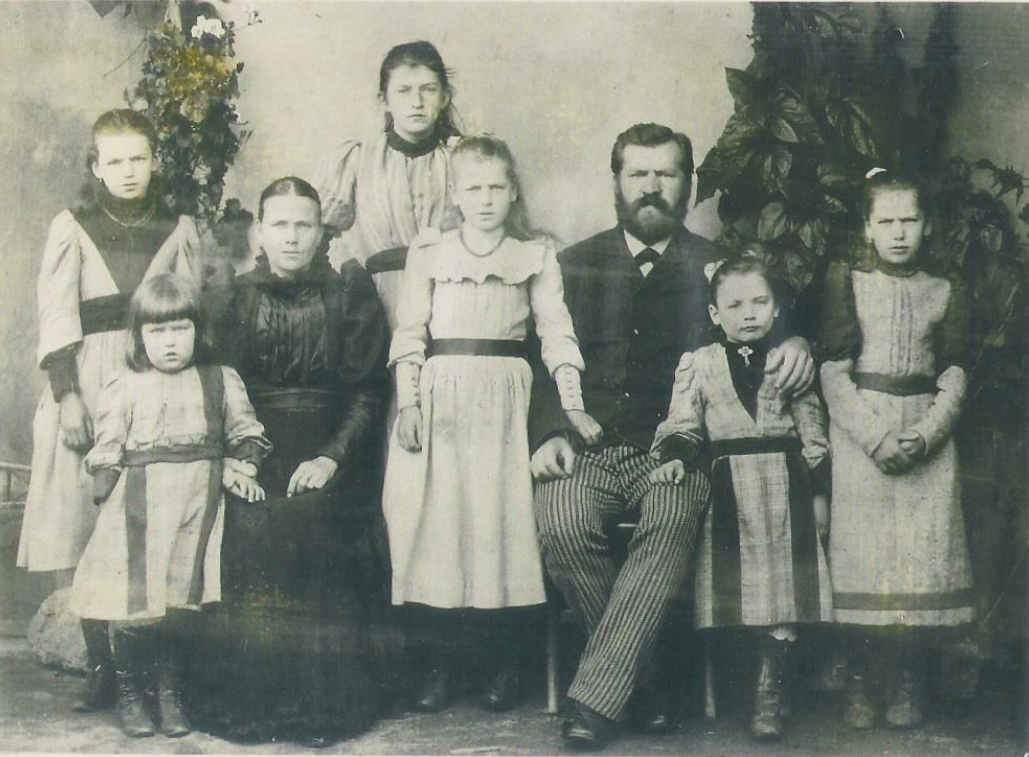
Frieda between her parents (c. 1893)

Due to the great distance from her home in Schonach, Hodapp remained in Karlsruhe for long periods, where she suffered from severe "homesickness". (Note: Original German: Ich hatte ein namenloses Heimweh ...) Her memoirs suggest this emotional strain resulted in negative marks for being "restless" in both her general and musical education. (Note: Original German: ... erhielt ich in der Musikschule wie auch in der anderen Schule im Betragen einigemale die Bemerkung „unruhig".) She was only able to return home during the school holidays, when she used the time to support her growing family by "performing small concerts" in the towns surrounding Schonach. (Note: Original German: Ich spielte in den benachbarten Städtchen in kleinen Konzerten, die mein Vater arrangierte. Ich tat es gerne, – aber ich mußte selbst das Geld einsammeln.)

Hodapp's teacher and mentor, Will, established contact with Grand Duchess Louise of Baden. Regarding the Grand Duchess, Kwast-Hodapp later remarked: "She became my patron", as she granted her a scholarship for her studies, thereby securing her "immediate future". (Note: Original German: Sie wurde meine Protektorin ... und meine nächste Zukunft war gesichert.) Her progress was demonstrated to the Grand Duchess during a private recital; by the age of ten, Hodapp's technical skills had developed to the point that she successfully performed the first movement of a concerto by Hummel in the conservatory's final recital. Following this performance, it was arranged for her to move to Frankfurt in 1891 to continue her studies under Professor James Kwast.

=== Frankfurt, James Kwast, Hoch Conservatory, and Mendelssohn Prize (1891–1899) ===
In the autumn of 1891, at the age of eleven, Hodapp moved to Frankfurt to study privately with James Kwast, who was the Director of the Piano Department at the Hoch Conservatory. Kwast initially insisted on a full year, requiring a full year dedicated exclusively to technical exercises. This met with resistance from her father, who relied on her performances for income. After securing further patronage, Hodapp was admitted to the Hoch Conservatory in September 1892 as a "scholarship student". (Note: Original German: .... wurde sie im Frankfurter Konservatorium als Freischülerin aufgenommen.)

Under Kwast's continuous guidance, Hodapp became one of the conservatory's most promising students. While her "technical skills" and "aptitude" were noted as exceptional, she recalls, her preference for "rapid tempi" was occasionally cause for concern among her instructors. (Note: Original German: Man zweifelte an meinem guten Geschmack, und die Meinung über meine Zukunft wurde ganz bedenklich, als ich ... erklärte, daß ich langsame Sätze nicht gern spiele. Ich mußte mich erst austoben und die Finger laufen lassen, wenn ich bewegte Tempi hatte, fühlte ich mich in meinem Element.) After receiving an honourable mention and winning a scholarship at the Felix Mendelssohn Bartholdy Competition in 1897 while still a student, she won the prestigious prize (Staatspreis) in 1898. The prize money of 1,500 marks—a significant sum at the time—granted her financial independence for the first time. In June 1899, Hodapp successfully completed her seven-year course at the Hoch Conservatory with a "brilliant final certificate". (Note: Original German: ... ausgestattet mit einem glänzenden Abgangszeugnis des Konservatoriums ihre künstlerische Laufbahn zu beginnen.)

== Career ==
=== Early career and Darmstadt (1899–1901) ===
Artists' Colony at Darmstadt (c. 1901)

In late May 1899, Hodapp performed Brahms's F minor Sonata in Karlsruhe, which was celebrated as her "greatest success" with an "effective performance". Her professional career was further solidified on 25 September 1899, when Hodapp launched her professional career at the opening of the "Richard Wagner Society's concert season" in Darmstadt. (Note: Original German: Die Concertsaison in Darmstadt wurde von dem Richагd Wagner Verein mit einem Clavier-Abend von Fräulein Frieda Hodapp aus Frankfurt a. M. am 25. September eröffnet.) This public appearance garnered her great acclaim. The music press highlighted her "eminent technique", which was able to "do justice" to the "diverse styles" of her demanding program featuring works by Johann Sebastian Bach, Ludwig van Beethoven, Franz Schubert, Frédéric Chopin, Edvard Grieg, and Franz Liszt. (Note: Original German: ... den verschiedensten Stylarten angehörenden Stücke, wie sehr sie, bei einer eminenten Technik, auch dem jemaligen Geist der Composition gerecht zu werden vermag.) While critics praised her versatility, they also noted a need for further "inner depth", though the "enthusiastic applause" was considered well-deserved. (Note: Original German: Zu wünschen wäre dem meisterhaften Spiele der jungen Künstlerin nur noch eine kleine Nüance mehr Innerlichkeit. Enthusiastischer Beifall lohnte einen jeden ihrer Vorträge ...)

After substituting for the ailing Kwast in a performance for Baron von Heyl, thus gaining "access to the grand bourgeoisie", (Note: Original German: ... Zutritt zur großbürgerlichen Gesellschaft Darmstadts folgte, als sie – ersatzweise für ihren erkrankten Lehrer einspringend – zum wöchentlichen Hauskonzert bei Baron von Heyl gebeten wurde.) she received further concert and teaching opportunities and subsequently moved to Darmstadt. There, she became associated with the musicians of the Darmstadt Artists' Colony at Mathildenhöhe, which had been founded by Grand Duke Ernst Ludwig. In 1901, she was officially appointed as Court Virtuoso of the Grand Duchy of Hesse (Großherzoglich-Hessische Kammervirtuosin).

=== Russian tour and marriage (1902) ===
In January 1902, facilitated by her connection to Grand Duke Ernst Ludwig, Hodapp embarked on a several-month concert tour of the Russian Empire. Her stay in Saint Petersburg was a resounding success. She recalled a performance before Tsarina Alexandra Feodorovna (the Grand Duke's sister) granted her access to the city's prestigious aristocratic "palaces and salons". (Note: Original German: ... kam der Auftrag, dass ich am dritten Tag bei der Czarin zu spielen hätte ... und das Spielen in verschiedenen Palais und Salons konnte beginnen)

She subsequently travelled to Moscow at the invitation of the Grand Duke's other sister, Grand Duchess Elisabeth Feodorovna. During an orchestral symphony concert, Hodapp performed works by Camille Saint-Saëns as an interlude. In her 1934 memoirs, Hodapp recalled the overwhelming reception, noting that the audience called her back to the stage "sixteen times". (Note: Original German: Niemand hatte eine Ahnung von mir, aber ich erlebte einen Erfolg, daß ich 16mal vor die Rampe gerufen wurde. Mir schwindelte, denn das war mir noch nicht begegnet.) This stay in Russia proved rewarding both artistically and financially, and she recalled that her performances for the nobility earned her a "small collection" of valuable jewellery. (Note: Original German: Ich hatte bis zu dieser Zeit keine Brillanten besessen, aber mein Spiel bei all diesen Fürstlichkeiten brachte mir in kurzer Zeit eine kleine Sammlung reizender Geschenke und Erinnerungen.)

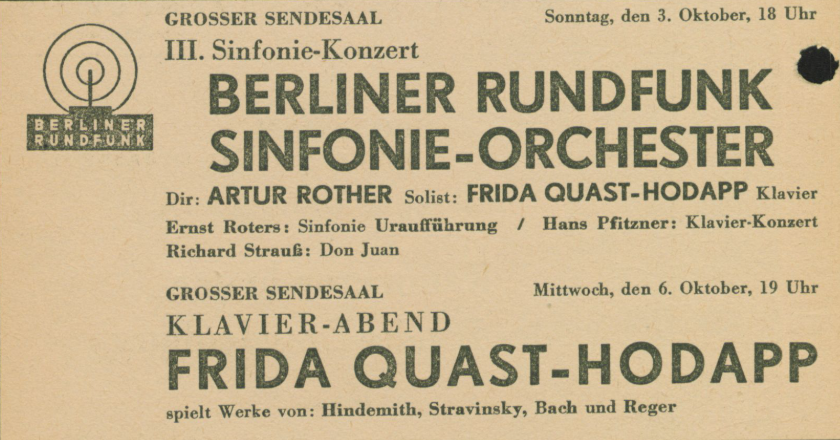
In the summer of 1902, she married her former teacher, Kwast, who was 28 years older, taking the married name Kwast-Hodapp. (Note: Her married name was occasionally spelt "Quast". See ) They spent their honeymoon in the Netherlands, Kwast's birthplace, in Great Britain, and finally in the region of her origin. Then, they settled in Berlin, where Kwast began teaching at the Klindworth-Scharwenka Conservatory in October of the same year.

=== Move to Berlin and European recognition (1902–1911) ===
In October 1902, the Kwasts moved to Berlin. Already praised for their performances of Mozart's Sonata in D major and Saint-Saëns' Variations on a Theme by Beethoven for two pianos earlier that year, they had garnered advance acclaim as "two first-rate forces". Upon their arrival in the capital, the Kwasts continued this success. A Liszt concert they organised included an "excellent performance" of the Concerto pathétique for two pianos, (Note: Original German: Ein Liszt Konzert, das von dem Künstlerehepaar Kwast-Hodapp veranstaltet wurde, brachte u. A. das Concert pathétique für zwei Klaviere in ausgezeichneter Ausführung ...) followed by a recital on 5 November at Berlin's Bechstein Hall, where the press lauded their "excellent interplay". (Note: Original German: Herr Prof. James Kwast und Frau Frieda Kwast Hodapp veranstalteten einen Klavierabend im Bechsteinsaal am 5. November, in welchem sie Mozarts Ddur-Sonate und die Variationen über ein Beethovensches Thema von Saint-Saëns auf zwei Klavieren vortrugen. Das Zusammenspiel war ausgezeichnet ...) The pair then embarked on a months-long concert tour throughout the Russian Empire—including Moscow—returning via Constantinople, Bucharest, Budapest, and Vienna.

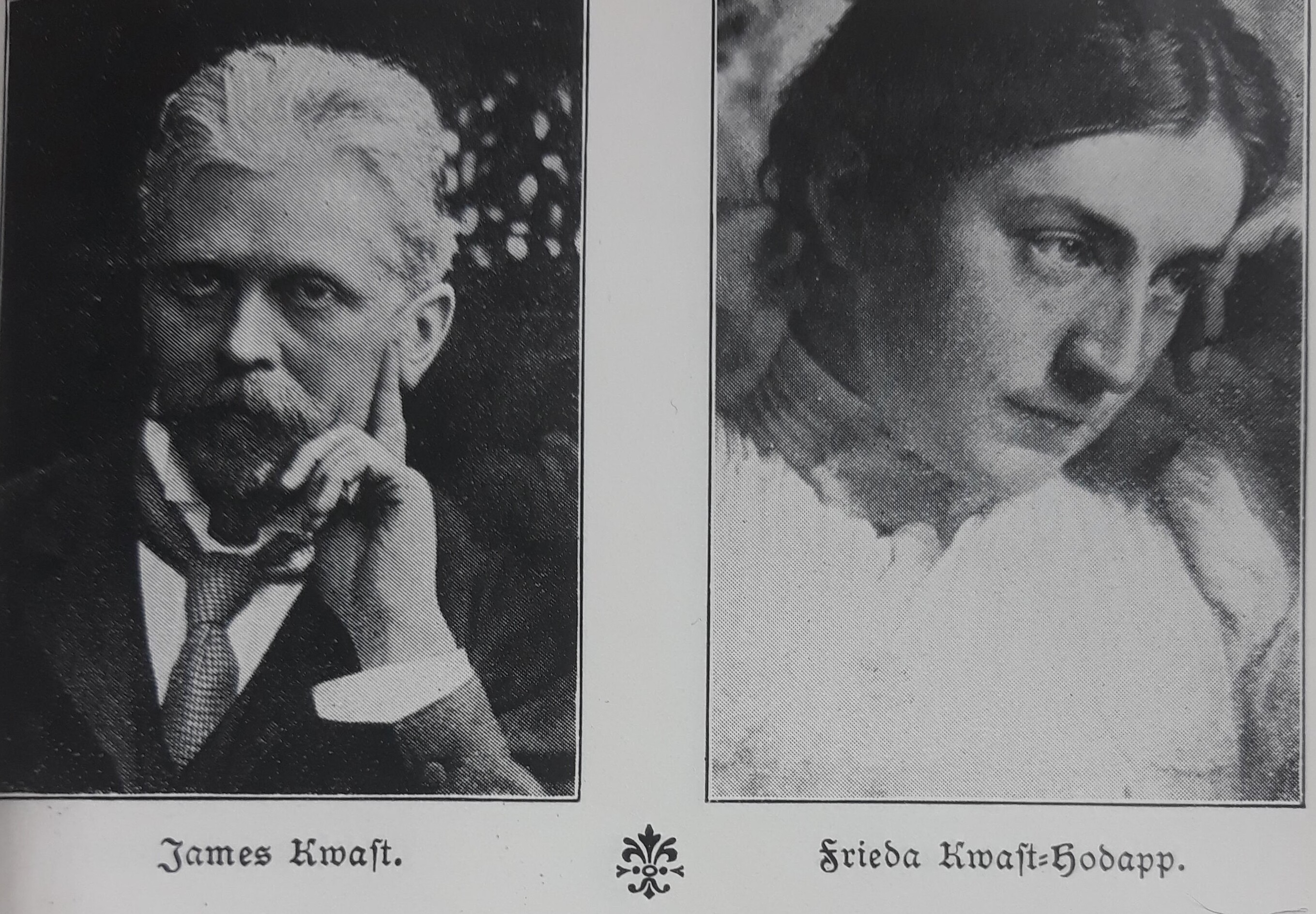
The Kwasts in Spemann's Das goldene Buch der Musik (1912)

In 1905, Kwast-Hodapp began teaching at the Stern Conservatory, and in April 1906, she made her orchestral debut at the Berlin Philharmonie, performing the Piano Concerto in C minor, Op. 42, by Bolko Graf von Hochberg—the influential former general intendant of the Prussian Royal Theatres—under the baton of Richard Strauss. Hugo Leichtentritt emphasised her "excellently" played piano part, which led to numerous further engagements. In the following years, her name appeared frequently in Berlin programs alongside eminent figures such as Artur Schnabel, Ferruccio Busoni, Eugen d'Albert, Edwin Fischer, and Wilhelm Backhaus. Her repertoire encompassed the entire piano literature from the Classical to the Modern eras; she performed alongside other "significant artists", like Busoni, Leopold Godowsky, and Berthe Marx-Goldschmidt in "all-Chopin recitals", which were noted for being "antithetical to the notion of Chopin as a composer of mass appeal".

Kwast-Hodapp's international career expanded significantly, although "most concerts took place on German soil". (Note: Original German: Wenn die meisten Konzerte auch auf deutschem Boden stattfanden ...) Between 1903 and 1909, she undertook numerous tours throughout Europe—performing in London, Paris, and Amsterdam—and returned to the Russian Empire for appearances in Saint Petersburg, Moscow, Riga, and Helsinki. (Note: Dates of her concerts abroad between 1903 and 1909: London (1903), Moskau, Petersburg und Riga (Okt. 1905), Paris (1906 unter Richard Strauss), erneut Riga (1906), Helsinki und Amsterdam (1909))

Berlin was then a gathering place for the "talents and energies" that would later establish the city as a global cultural centre during the Weimar Republic. In addition to Kwast-Hodapp's and her husband's musical connections, they integrated into the city's broader cultural life, cultivating friendships with the painter Adolph Menzel, the writer Frank Wedekind, and the publisher Franz Ries, as well as novelist Richard Voss and the painter Raffael Schuster-Woldan, who later portrayed Kwast-Hodapp.

Kwast-Hodapp's impact on the musical world was formally recognised in 1912, when she, alongside her husband, was awarded the Order for Art and Science in Gold (Orden für Kunst und Wissenschaft in Gold) by Adolf Friedrich V, Grand Duke of Mecklenburg-Strelitz.

=== Collaboration with Max Reger (1906–1915) ===
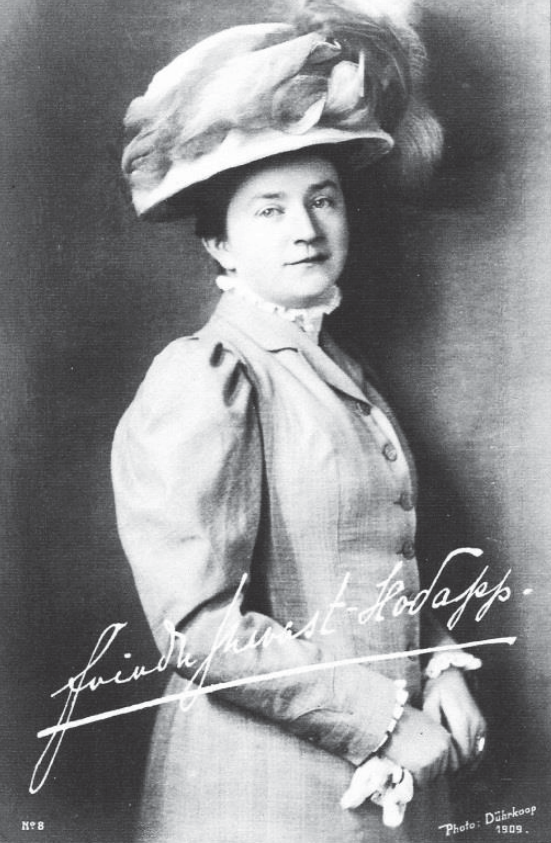
Kwast-Hodapp (1909)

In 1906, Kwast-Hodapp began studying Max Reger's Variationen und Fuge über ein Thema von Joh. Seb. Bach, Op. 81. After memorising the work, consisting of 14 variations, she travelled to Leipzig to perform it for the composer. Impressed, Reger promised to dedicate a new composition to her. She performed his Bach Variations in Berlin in 1907 and again at the Dortmund Reger Festival in early 1909. At the festival's opening, critics praised her "brilliant technique", in her command of the work that "falls clearly within the tradition of monumental piano variations of the nineteenth century". For the festival's closing concert, Kwast-Hodapp performed alongside Reger his work Introduction, Passacaglia and Fugue, Op. 96 for two pianos.

In 1910, while staying in Champex, Kwast-Hodapp received the score for Reger's Piano Concerto, which was dedicated to her. (Note: Original German: Frieda Kwast-Hodapp, die das ihr gewidmete Opus ...) The premiere took place on 15 December 1910 at the Leipzig Gewandhaus, with soloist Kwast-Hodapp and the Gewandhaus Orchestra under the baton of Arthur Nikisch. She later recalled the immense physical and mental strain of the preparation: "I had only one orchestral rehearsal and had to exert enormous effort to absorb the sheer volume of the orchestra's sound". (Note: Original German: Ich hatte nur eine Orchesterprobe für das Regerkonzert vor der öffentlichen Probe und mußte mich enorm zusammennehmen, die Klangmassen des Orchesters über mich ergehen zu lassen.) Hodapp-Kwast performed "from memory". She wrote in her autobiography that this decision made her husband so nervous that he stayed away from the concert hall. (Note: Original German: Nikisch sagte zu mir: „Das wollen Sie auswendig spielen?” Ich hatte den Mut, aber mein Mann regte sich so auf, daß er an diesem Abend nicht wagte, in den Saal zu gehen.)

The premiere was described by contemporary critics as a "failure". While Walter Niemann praised Kwast-Hodapp's "pianistic mastery and tender, almost maternal love" with which the work was "baptised" and thanked her for her "courageously beautiful performance", (Note: Original German: ... mit voller pianistischer Meisterschaft und zärtlichster Patinnenliebe aus der Taufe hob, für ihr mutig-schönes Vollbringen zu danken. An dem ihr geltenden lebhaften Beifall partizipierte auch der zweimal auf das Podium heraustretende Autor. (Walter Niemann)) the Allgemeine Musik-Zeitung focused on the work's perceived "many weaknesses". (Note: Original German (PDF scan p. 119: Im letzten Philharmonischen Konzert wurde Max Regers Klavierkonzert zum ersten Male in Berlin gespielt. Das Werk zeigt ebenso wie das Violinkonzert viele Schwächen.) Kwast-Hodapp recalls that the press tone was predominantly negative: "For example, a widely read Berlin newspaper wrote "a Himalaya of rubbish", while another leading newspaper addressed me directly, "back, you won't save your friend". (Note: Original German: So schrieb z. B. eine sehr gelesene Berliner Zeitung „ein Himalaja von Unrat”, eine andere führende Zeitung richtete an mich das Wort, „zurück, Du rettest den Freund doch nicht”.) Other Leipzig critics went further, dismissing the work as "a new miscarriage of the inbred Reger muse".

Despite the initial backlash, the collaboration remained prestigious. In March 1911, during a Reger festival in Bückeburg, both the composer and the pianist were awarded the Lippe Rose Order for Art and Science (Lippische Rose Ehrenzeichen für Kunst und Wissenschaft)—Reger 1st class and Kwast Hodapp 2nd class—by Prince Adolf of Schaumburg-Lippe. (Note: Original German (PDF scan p. 294): Bückeburg ... Der Fürst von Schaumburg-Lippe dankte durch Verleihung des Ordens für Kunst und Wissenschaft erster Klasse an Max Reger, zweiter Klasse an Frau Kwast-Hodapp.) Their close professional bond was reflected in correspondence, in which Reger addressed her with affectionate nicknames such as "Colleague in Apollo", "Passacaglia prima", or, jokingly, "Pitiable One (because you have to play this unspeakable concerto)". Between 1910 and 1913, Kwast-Hodapp remained the concerto's foremost advocate, performing it eighteen times.

On 14 March 1915, Kwast-Hodapp performed the world premiere of Reger's Variations and Fugue on a Theme by G. Ph. Telemann, Op. 134, in Berlin. Reger had completed the work in 1914 and dedicated it to her husband, James Kwast. The critical reception in the Neue Musik-Zeitung was particularly harsh; the critic Bruno Schrader dismissed the composition as "long and empty" and further contended that the pianist herself was "greatly overrated".

Even after Reger's death in 1916, Kwast-Hodapp continued to advocate for the performance of his work and contributed to the preservation of his musical estate during World War II.

=== War years and hyperinflation, collaboration with Ferruccio Busoni and Hans Pfitzner (1914–1925) ===
The Kwasts were on holiday in South Tyrol at the start of World War I. Their return to Berlin was not immediate; they travelled a circuitous route via Italy, Switzerland, and the Black Forest. During the war, Kwast-Hodapp faced significant professional setbacks as contracts were voided and many of her students were drafted for military or medical duties. Despite these hardships, she maintained her presence in Berlin's musical life, performing under conductors like Nikisch, Strauss, and Felix Weingartner. She also remained in close contact with peers such as Wilhelm Furtwängler and Busoni.

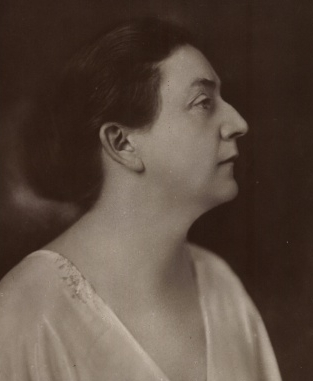
Kwast-Hodapp (c. 1918)

"The end of the war by no means brought an improvement in the situation", (Note: Original German: Das Ende des Krieges bedeutete keinesfalls eine Verbesserung der Lage ...) as hyperinflation further eroded the value of performance fees. To maintain her livelihood, Kwast-Hodapp accepted almost every available engagement, performing over eighty concerts across Germany in a single winter season. She later recalled the logistical strain of inflation, noting that by the time her agreed-upon fees were paid, their purchasing power had often vanished, requiring her to exchange currency for goods immediately after a concert.

Despite these economic conditions, Kwast-Hodapp continued her musical activities. In January 1922, a review in the Musikalische Rundschau highlighted her performance at an "extraordinary concert" at Düsseldorf. (Note: Original German: ... außerordentlichen Konzert der ... Frau Kwast-Hodapp zu nennen.) The critic noted that she "delighted" the audience with modern masters, including a "problematic" Trauerfantasie (Fantasia nach Johann Sebastian Bach, BV 253) by Busoni, a "not very convincing" sonata by Vítězslav Novák, and "interesting" works by Claude Debussy. Her playing was described as "typically clear in conception, finely polished, and translated into ravishing sound". (Note: Original German: Frau Kwast-Hodapp ... entzückte diesmal durch moderne Meister, eine problematische Trauerfantasie von Busoni , eine nicht sehr überzeugende Sonate des Böhmen Novak und interessante Debussy, wie immer klar in der Auffassung , sauber gefeilt und hinreißend in Klang umgesetzt.)

Her collaboration with Busoni in the early 1920s led to the revision of his Zehn Variationen über ein Präludium von Chopin, BV 213a. Although Busoni had dismissed the original 1884 version in 1912 as "not worth saving", he revised the work in 1922 following Kwast-Hodapp's intervention. Their correspondence from 1922 to 1924, analysed by musicologist Antony Beaumont, details her role in the work's restructuring and her subsequent inclusion of the new version in her repertoire.

In parallel with her work with Busoni, Kwast-Hodapp promoted the music of Hans Pfitzner, the son-in-law of her husband. Following the work's premiere in March 1923, she performed Pfitzner's Piano Concerto in E-flat major, Op. 31, at the Mannheim National Theatre under the baton of Rudolf Schulz-Domburg in October 1923. In December 1923, she gave the Leipzig premiere at the Gewandhaus, where the press noted that she played the concerto "excellently". (Note: Original German: Pfitzners Klavierkonzert ist nun auch im Gewandhauskonzert, von Fr. Kwast-Hodapp trefflich gespielt, erklungen.)

In 1923, Kwast-Hodapp was appointed as a piano teacher for "master classes" at the Mannheim Academy of Music (Hochschule für Musik Mannheim). (Note: Original German: Frieda Kwast-Hodapp wurde zur Abhaltung von Meisterkursen im Frühjahr an die Hochschule für Musik in Mannheim berufen.) This new position provided financial stability, allowing her to resume recreational travel to Italy, Austria, and France.

=== International career and personal loss (1925–1931) ===
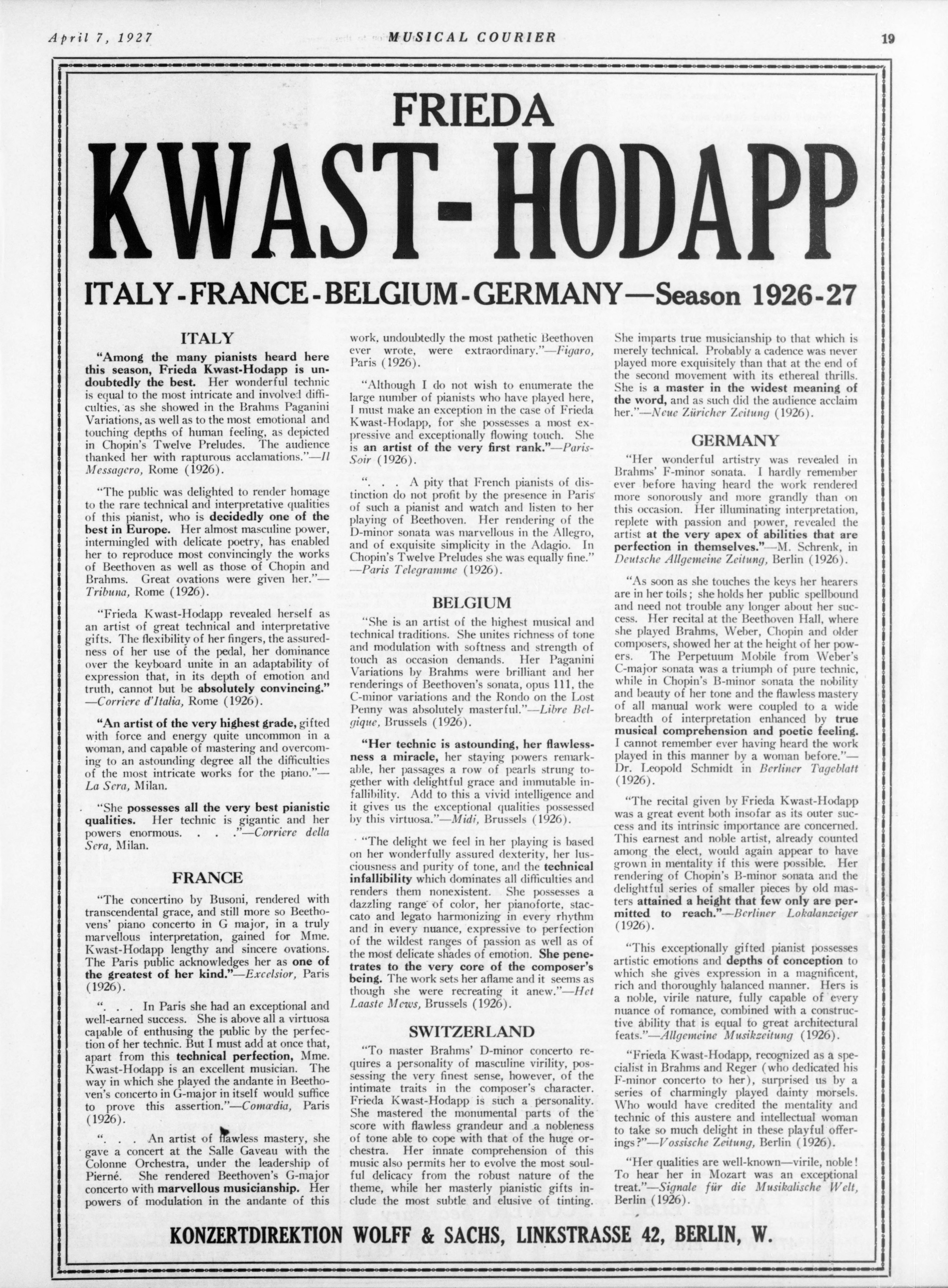
Advertisement in the Musical Courier in 1927

Starting in autumn 1925, Kwast-Hodapp undertook extensive concert tours across Europe. Her itinerary included London, Stockholm, Zurich, Milan, and Vienna, followed by engagements in Belgium and the Netherlands, concluding in Paris in March 1926. The success of these performances led to an expanded tour during the 1926–27 winter season, adding cities such as Bern, Geneva, Genoa, Rome, Gothenburg, and Budapest. Despite the physical strain of this international activity, she continued to perform in Berlin during the summer months.

In the autumn of 1927, her professional momentum was abruptly halted; upon returning to Berlin on 31 October 1927, she learned of her husband, James Kwast's, sudden death. In her autobiography, Kwast-Hodapp described him as both a "mentor and friend" since her youth, crediting him with fostering her artistic and personal development. (Note: Original German: Seit meinem 11. Jahr war mein Mann mir Führer und Freund. Meine ganze Entwicklung, die künstlerische Entfaltung wurde von ihm in Fürsorglichkeit betreut und miterlebt. ... Ich hätte keinen besseren Lebensgefährten haben können. Er gestaltete das Leben für mich so, daß ich mich frei entfalten und meine ganze Persönlichkeit so entwickeln konnte, daß ich nirgends ein Hemmnis fand oder empfand ...)

Following her husband's death, she initially continued her professional activities, performing in Berlin, Paris, London, and Amsterdam throughout 1928 and 1929. However, her public appearances became increasingly sporadic by the early 1930s, with only a few recorded engagements in Paris (February 1930) and Berlin (January and March 1931). Kwast-Hodapp recalled this period as a time of profound personal struggle and "heavy sorrow", noting that only her "artistic duties" and the support of a close friend sustained her. (Note: Original German: In jener Zeit voll anstrengender Arbeit (…) hatte ich grosses persönliches Leid durchzukämpfen, einen schweren Kummer, der mich fast zu Boden drückte. Nur durch meine künstlerischen Pflichten hielt ich mich aufrecht, und durch die seelische Hilfe einer mütterlichen Freundin.)

In the early 1930s, after almost thirty years in Berlin, she left the capital to begin, as she wrote in her autobiography, a "new life" – moving to Thuringia's Holzdorf Estate before finally settling in a "charming southern German city", leaving behind her pianistic and pedagogical career. (Note: Original German: Die Folge dieser schweren Zeiten war, dass ich Berlin verliess, das Unterrichten aufgab und ein neues Leben begann zunächst auf dem Gut in Thüringen, wo ich schon vor Jahren so beglückt gearbeitet hatte und liess mich dann in einer kleineren reizenden süddeutschen Stadt nieder, nachdem ich mich von meinen anhänglichen Schülern verabschiedet hatte und von Berlin, das fast 30 Jahre meine zweite Heimat gewesen war.)

=== Private life at Holzdorf Estate (c. 1931–1945) ===
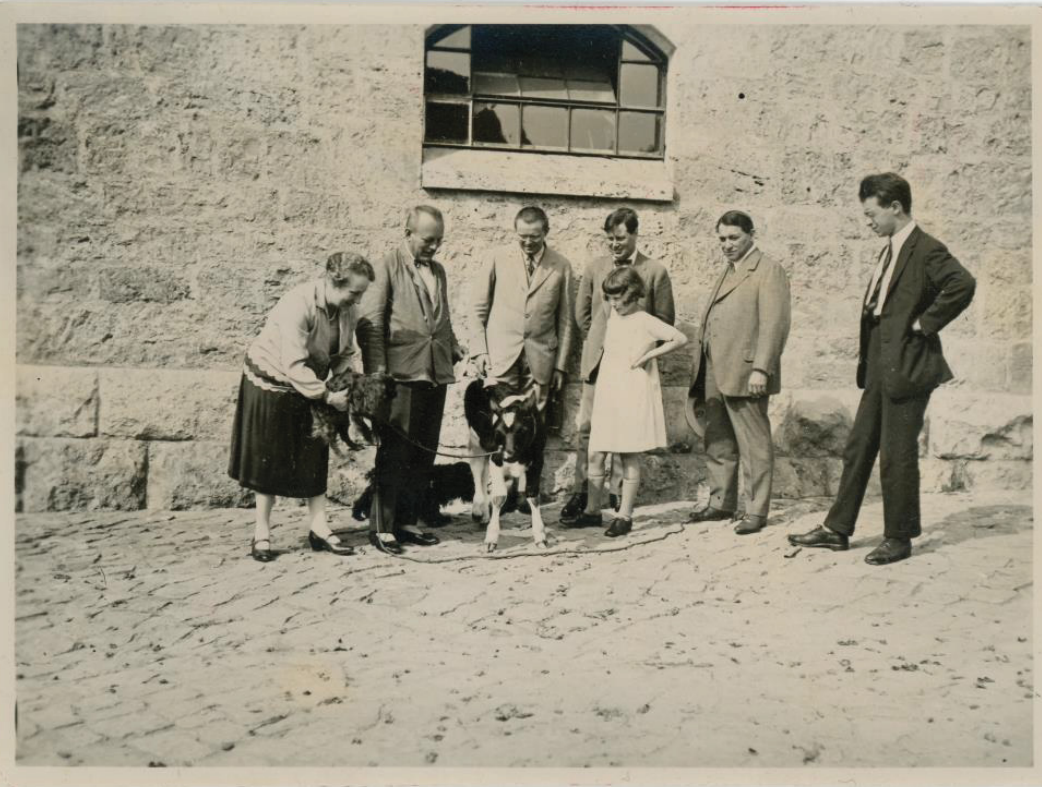
Kwast-Hodapp (far left) and Adolf Busch (second from left) with Otto Krebs (second from right) and Rudolf Serkin (far right) at Holzdorf, 1927.

Around 1931, Kwast-Hodapp gradually withdrew from public concert life and began living with the industrialist and art collector Otto Krebs. Having known each other since their time in Berlin and travelled to Norway together as early as 1924, the couple divided their time between Krebs's villa in Heidelberg and his 100-hectare estate in Holzdorf. They also undertook extended travels to New York, Iceland, Svalbard, and Egypt.

Kwast-Hodapp later recalled that Holzdorf provided the necessary seclusion to recover from the demands of her 35-year career and what she perceived as the decline of a "cultural era". (Note: Original German: Ich war auch so erschöpft von all den Anstrengungen und Aufregungen, dass ich es als eine Wohltat empfand, die schweren Pflichten los zu sein, umso mehr, als ich sie ja 35 Jahre getragen hatte und genau wusste, dass diese Kulturepoche zu Ende ging.) During this period, she devoted herself to the study of rarely performed musical literature. The estate became an established cultural centre; as early as 1927, renowned musicians, including the Busch Quartet and the pianist Rudolf Serkin, were regular guests.

Kwast-Hodapp and Krebs married on 20 March 1941, shortly before he succumbed to cancer. His will stipulated that his estate be divided between his wife and the Mannheim Stiftung für Krebs- und Scharlachforschung (Foundation for Cancer and Scarlet Fever Research). Between 1942 and 1944, Kwast-Hodapp hosted masterclasses for her Heidelberg piano students at the Holzdorf estate in Thuringia, which remained largely unaffected by World War II. Alongside her teaching, she also took on the role of custodian for the legacy of Reger. In late 1943, amid the escalating dangers of the war, significant items from the Max Reger Archive—including his Ibach grand piano, writing desk, and library—were evacuated to Holzdorf for protection under her care. Following the war, these items were safely transported to Meiningen, where the archive reopened in 1948. Her final visit to the estate occurred on 13 March 1945, shortly before the unconditional surrender of Nazi Germany, to secure "valuables and provisions". (Note: Original German: ... einige Wertsachen und Verpflegung mitnehmen.)

The post-war period brought significant upheaval. After the Berlin Four-Power Declaration, Holzdorf, which passed from American to Soviet occupation on 1 July 1945, was ultimately expropriated without compensation in 1945 as part of the Soviet-led land reform. The famous Krebs art collection disappeared, though parts of it are held in the Hermitage Museum in Saint Petersburg. Kwast-Hodapp's personal archive was also lost; in her will, notarised on 10 August 1949, she expressed her wish to recover "if still in Holzdorf, a large number of books ... scores, musical manuscripts, notes, and letters". (Note: Original German: falls in Holzdorf noch vorhanden, eine große Anzahl Bücher, [...], Noten und Notenmanuskripte, Aufzeichnungen, Briefe, evtl. zum Herausgeben.)

=== Teaching in Heidelberg and late career (1941–1949) ===
On 21 November 1941, Kwast-Hodapp joined the Nazi Party and therefore became a member of the Reich Chamber of Music. (Note: Information from the NSDAP membership card, howerver, the denazification file of Frieda Krebs, concert pianist, of the Heidelberg Spruchkammer dated 2 November 1946: GlAKa, 465 a/59/1/4593 noted a different date) This allowed her to return to the stage with 1942 Reger programs in Heidelberg, Weimar, and Freiburg. In 1943, she was also granted a teaching assignment at the Faculty of Philosophy at Heidelberg University. Her curriculum included a "lecture series" on Bach's The Well-Tempered Clavier, which featured her own "instrumental demonstrations". (Note: Original German: Frieda Kwast-Hodapp liest in dem soeben begonnenen Semester ein Kolleg über Joh. Seb. Bachs „Wohltemperiertes Klavier" mit Instrumentaldarbietungen.) Additionally, she conducted public masterclasses in the Alte Universität's auditorium and extended her teaching activities to include masterclasses in Freiburg. During this period, Kwast-Hodapp also collaborated with Fritz Henn, the director of the Hochschule für Kirchenmusik Heidelberg. Notably, her 1934 autobiography was later discovered within Henn's personal papers.

During this period, she remained a dedicated proponent of contemporary music. In early 1943, she performed the world premiere of Wolfgang Fortner's Piano Concerto in Heidelberg, which critics described as a "sensational event". (Note: Original German: Die Uraufführung des neuen Klavierkonzertes von Wolfgang Fortner in Heidelberg mit Frieda Kwast-Hodapp als Solistin gestaltete sich zu einem sensationellen Ereignis.) Returning to the stage after a long hiatus, her performance was hailed as a "triumph of superior technique" and "extraordinary tonal culture", demonstrating a deep "intellectual penetration" of the work. (Note: Original German: ... Kwast-Hodapp ... nach langjahriger Pause wieder aufs Podium ging, um gleich hier einen Triumph ihrer überlegenen Technik, ihres eminent geistig durchdrungenen Spieles und ihrer auBerordentlichen Klangkultur zu erringen ...) She also premiered Karl Hesse's Toccata, Passacaglia und Fuge für Klavier und großes Orchester in 1944.

In 1944, Kwast-Hodapp was included in Subsection B of the Gottbegnadeten-Liste (literally God-gifted list), a compilation of artists considered crucial to Nazi culture by the Reich Ministry of Public Enlightenment and Propaganda. Nevertheless, the regime refused to grant her the official title of professor at the University of Heidelberg. Living as a widow in her Heidelberg villa, she faced no financial hardship; the musicologist Walter Salmen later recalled her generous hospitality during his 1946 visit.

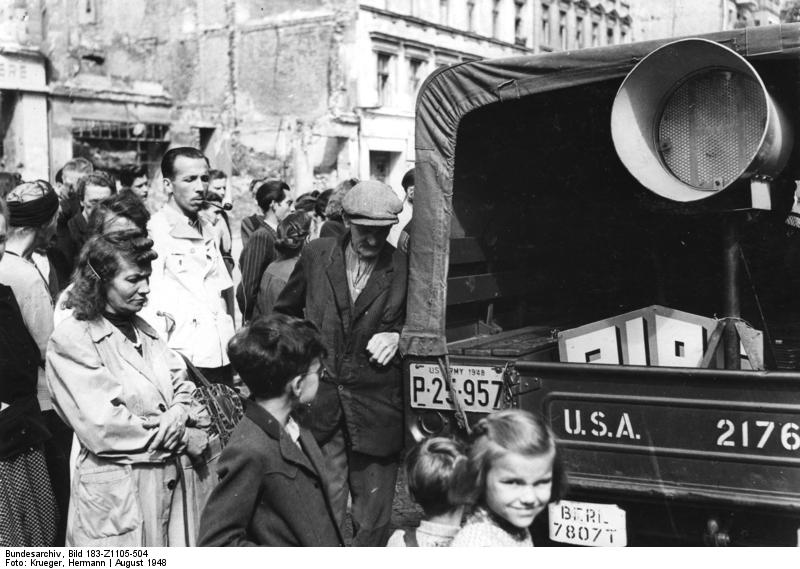
West Berlin in 1948

Kwast-Hodapp's post-war career culminated on 7 March 1948, with a performance of Reger's Piano Concerto at West Berlin's Titania-Palast with the RIAS Symphony Orchestra. The concert was broadcast live by RIAS. Kwast-Hodapp recalled that she was privately "crushed" by the sight of the city in ruins, describing the "irreparable" destruction as "frightful". (Note: Original German: Sonst war ich wie erschlagen von Berlin. Der Riß, der dieser Stadt zugefügt ist, ist nie wiedergutzumachen und übertrifft in seiner Wirkung die Zerstörung. Furchtbar!) She felt a deep emotional connection to the "melancholy" of Reger's work, which she found to be "painful" and without "redemption". (Note: Original German: Es ist ein wunderbares Werk, aber in seiner Schwermut belastet es auch das Gemüt; es ist das schmerzlichste Werk, das ich kenne. Es ist ein Suchen und Ringen, dann ein Flehen im langsamen Satz, auch Humor im letzten, aber keine Erlösung. Ich möchte schön spielen und groß und ergreifend und zugleich demütig vor Gott.)

Throughout 1948, Kwast-Hodapp made a series of further radio recordings:

- 19 March (NWDR, West Berlin): Alexander Scriabin's Preludes Op 11 Nos 1–18 and Reger's Andantino espressivo from My Diary, Op. 82, Book 2, No. 6.
- 26 April (SDR Stuttgart): Selections from Bach's The Well-Tempered Clavier.
- 4 May (HR, Altes Funkhaus, Frankfurt): Fortner's Sonatina.
- 10 October (RIAS, West Berlin): Beethoven's Hammerklavier Sonata.

Following her final concert tour in late 1948, Kwast-Hodapp returned to Heidelberg in declining health. In June 1949, suffering from severe physical exhaustion and almost "total paralysis", she moved to Bad Wiessee to be cared for by her friend Eva Rieppel. (Note: Original German: Fast völlig gelähmt ließ sie sich im Juni 1949 zu ihrer Freundin Eva Rieppel nach Bad Wiessee bringen.) During her final weeks, she was visited by her former student, the composer Hans Werner Henze, who reportedly performed and improvised for her at her request. She died there on 14 September 1949 and was buried in Bad Wiessee's cemetery according to her wishes.

== Recordings ==
In February 1910, Kwast-Hodapp recorded 20 Duca piano rolls for the German reproducing piano manufacturer J. D. Philipps & Söhne. (Note: 16.02.1910—Frau Prof. Frida Kwast-Hodapp (1880–1949) [20 / no 288-305; 317–318]; 16.02.1910—Herr und Frau Prof. Kwast [3 / no 314-316], see) In addition to works by Beethoven, Brahms, Chopin, Liszt, Schubert, and Robert Schumann, the rolls include Carl Maria von Weber's Perpetuum Mobile, the Karl Tausig transcription of Bach's Toccata and Fugue in D minor, and her husband's Etude, Op. 20, No. 6. On roll no. 314, she performed Mozart's Five Variations on an Original Theme in G major for piano four-hands with her husband, Kwast. This recording was included in the 2024 digital release Bluette: Heritage Grieg, Liszt & Mozart, edited by Australian musicologist Peter Phillips for his label Novus Promusica.

=== Welte-Mignon and 78-rpm ===
Kwast-Hodapp recorded a further series of piano rolls for Welte-Mignon in August 1920. These releases included Reger's Variations and Fugue on a Theme of Telemann, Op. 134 (roll 3414). The German label Tacet remastered and published it in 2006 as part of the series The Welte Mignon Mystery (Vol. 5). Journal Fono Forum highlighted Kwast-Hodapp's playing as confirmation that she was "celebrated as one of the most significant pianists of her time", noting her "lively and generous" style, her ability to shape the variations "powerfully", holding the "tension", and playing the "climactic finale with compelling intensity". (Note: Section reviews, Fono Forum: "Dead men playing", 1 January 2007, see)

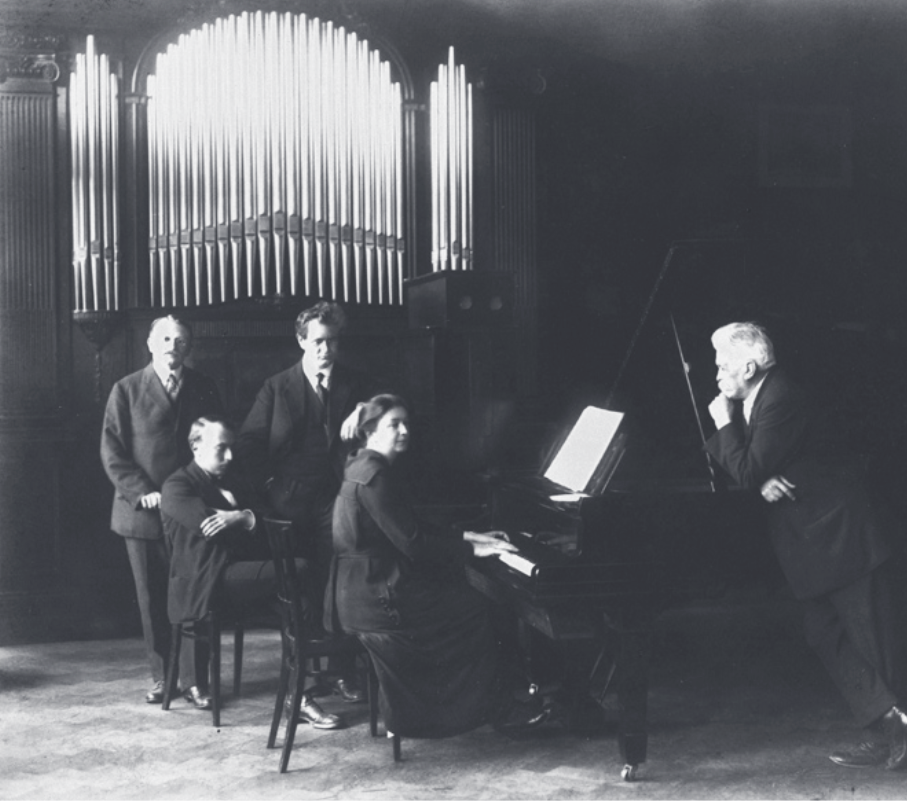
Kwast-Hodapp at Welte in 1920

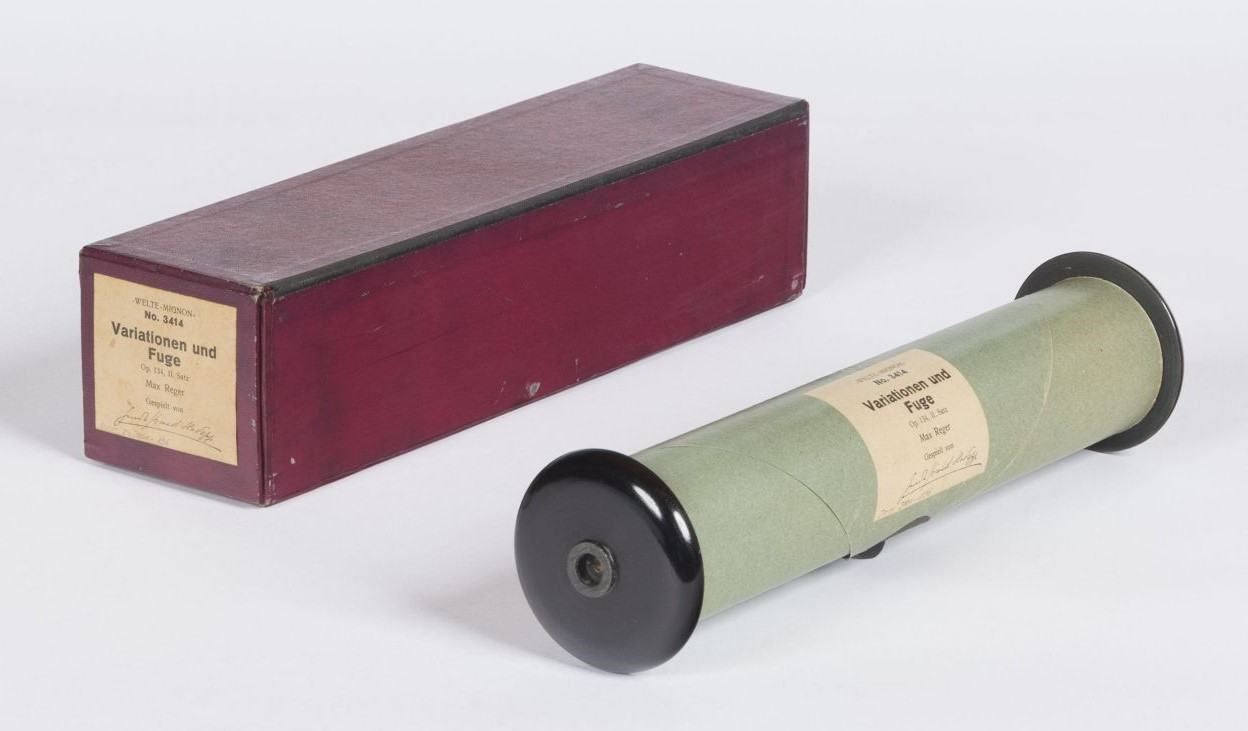
Welte Mignon, No. 3414

Her only commercial 78-rpm record was made in 1933 for Electrola, featuring works by Bach and Domenico Scarlatti; it was re-released by the International Piano Archives at the University of Maryland in the 2000 CD box set, A Multitude of Pianists: rare recordings from the Harry L. Anderson collection.

=== Post-war radio broadcasts ===
In April 2022, the label Meloclassics issued Frieda Kwast-Hodapp ∙ German Radio Recordings 1948. Critic Jonathan Woolf noted that the restoration and publication of these broadcasts were a "major undertaking" and "highly valuable". Reviewing the set for MusicWeb International, Rob Challinor examined five remastered broadcasts, beginning with a solo recital of works by Scriabin and Reger from April 1948, describing her playing as "reminiscent of the old school", yet "timeless". Regarding an April performance of Bach's The Well-Tempered Clavier, he characterised the interpretations as "attractive... though often quite romantic".
In her performance of Fortner's Sonatine, Challinor noted that Kwast-Hodapp "obviously relished" the piece. Regarding an October recital of Beethoven's Hammerklavier Sonata, he observed more "finger slips" than in her earlier career, but praised the "flexibility and flow" as "individual but engaging".

Challinor concluded with her 7 March 1948 performance of Reger's Piano Concerto at Berlin's Titania Palast—a work she had premiered 38 years earlier—noting that the performance "fulfilled his expectations". German critic Eleonore Büning also wrote of the Reger concert, exclaiming: "a super hand!" Despite "the few mistakes" following an eleven-year break, she highlighted Kwast-Hodapp's "drive", "strong accents", and "lean, unpompous diction", as well as a remaining "trace of coolly served virtuoso brilliance". (Note: Original German:... – eine Super-Pranke! ... Sie hatte da bereits mehr als elf Jahre lang pausiert, es sind ein paar Patzer zu hören. Aber auch toller Drive, starke Akzente, eine schlanke, unpompöse Diktion sowie Reste von kühl servierter Virtuosenbrillanz.)

== Legacy ==
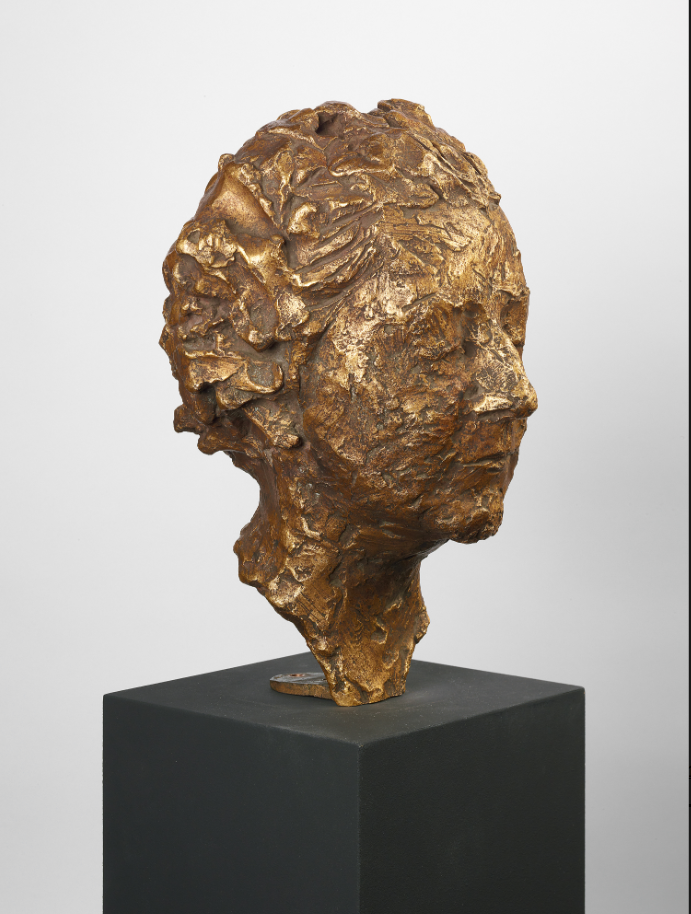
Kwast-Hodapp's bust by Ernesto de Fiori, 1930

Kwast-Hodapp, "renowned piano virtuoso and interpreter of Reger's works", was regarded by contemporaries as one of "the best piano players in Germany", (Note: Original German: Kwast-Hodapp, so heißt es, zähle zu den besten Klavierspielerinnen Deutschlands ...) a standing further defined by her role as a "preferred interpreter of Beethoven and Brahms in concerts led by conductors from Arthur Nikisch to Wilhelm Furtwängler". (Note: Original German: ... seinerzeit die „bevorzugte Beethoven- und Brahms-Interpretin in den Konzerten von Arthur Nikisch bis Wilhelm Furtwängler“ gewesen.) In his 1919 book Meister des Klaviers (Master of the piano), the composer and critic Niemann noted that, like all great Reger interpreters, she was by no means a mere "Reger specialist". (Note: Original German: Frieda Kwast-Hodapp ... Wie alle bedeutenden Regerspieler keineswegs Regerspezialistin ...) Instead, Niemann placed her among the "first-rank" of contemporary German virtuosos, praising her "brilliant technique" and a "nearly masculine-energetic, austere, and powerful" style in the classical and Brahmsian repertoire. (Note: Original German: ... hat sie sich gerade auch als klassische und als Brahmsspielerin ... kristallklarer und ausgeglichener, glänzender Technik und fast männlich-energischer, herber und wuchtiger Sonderart in die Reihe d e r deutschen Klaviervirtuosinnen der Gegenwart von erstem Rang gestellt ...) The composer and pianist Percy Grainger similarly is quoted by music critic Challinor as having described her as "the most prodigious talent amongst woman pianists I have ever encountered".

Her contemporary reputation was also built on her role in "bringing into being" major works of the 20th century, notably the piano concertos of Reger (1910) and Fortner (1943), (Note: Original German: Uraufführung von Wolfgang Fortners Klavierkonzert in C-dur ... Pianistin Frieda Kswost-Hodapsi, die einst Busonis und Regers Klavierkonzerte aus der Taufe hob ...) as well as on her influence on Busoni's 1922 revision of his Chopin Variations—through which the "unbridled energy of the young composer ... became a controlled exercise in irony and lightness".

Despite these accolades, her death in September 1949 went largely unnoticed by the "general public" amidst the post-war conditions in Germany. (Note: Original German: Im Treiben der ersten Nachkriegsjahre wurde der Tod Frieda Kwast-Hodapps von der Allgemeinheit nur wenig beachtet.) In the following decades, her name faded from public consciousness; as critic Büning noted, she occasionally reappears only "like a ghost, in a subordinate clause: the legendary pianist Frieda Elise Hodapp, married name Kwast". (Note: Original German: Manchmal taucht sie noch, wie ein Gespenst, im Nebensatz auf: die legendäre Pianistin Frieda Elise Hodapp, verheiratete Kwast.)

== Bibliography ==
- "A multitude of pianists: rare recordings from the Harry L. Anderson collection". WorldCat.
- Allgemeine Musik-Zeitung (in German). Vol. 38. 1902 – via Google Books – University of Colorado.
- Allgemeine Musik-Zeitung (in German). Vol. 38. 1911 – via Google Books – University of Colorado.
- Beaumont, Anthony (2025). "Busoni: Fantasia contrappuntistica and Works for Solo Piano". Chandos Records.
- "Berichte, Notizen" [Reports, notes]. Neue Zeitschrift für Musik (in German). 1923 – via Internet Archive.
- Büning, Eleonore (22 October 2022). "Unterm Strich – Ramsch oder Referenz?" [Bottom line – junk or a benchmark?]. Rondo (in German).
- Breithaupt, Rudolf Maria (1912). Die natürliche Klaviertechnik: Handbuch der modernen Methodik und Spielpraxis [Natural Piano Technique: Handbook of Modern Methodology and Playing Practice] (in German). Vol. 4. Leipzig: C.F. Kahnt. p. 678 – via Google Books. "Frieda Kwast-Hodapp (geb. 1880, bedeutende Klaviervirtuosin und Interpretin Regerscher Werke ..."
- Cahn, Peter (1979). Das Hoch'sche Konservatorium in Frankfurt am Main: (1879–1978) [The Hoch Conservatory in Frankfurt am Main: (1879–1978)] (in German). Frankfurt: Waldemar Kramer. p. 144. ISBN 978-3-7829-0214-4. "... Frieda Hodapp aus Schonach im Schwarzwald , deren Auffassungsgabe und Technik schon damals Staunen erregten"
- Challinor, Rob (11 October 2022). "Kwast-Hodapp German Radio 1948 Meloclassics MC1059". MusicWeb-International.
- Congress International Musicological (2003). Chopin and His Work in the Context of Culture: Studies. Warsaw: Polska Akademia Chopinowska. p. 31. ISBN 978-83-7099-127-2 – via Google Books - University of Michigan.
- "Darmstadt". Neue Zeitschrift für Musik (in German): 543. 1899 – via Google Books – Harvard University.
- "Duca Aufnahmebuch" [Duca recording book]. Faszinationpianola (in German). 10 March 2020.
- "Düsseldorf". Neue Zeitschrift für Musik: Musikalische Rundschau (in German): 5. 7 January 1922 – via HathiTrust - University of Iowa.
- Ferdinand, Horst (1990). Ottnad, Bernd (ed.). "Badische Biographie: Frieda Kwast-Hodapp" [Baden Biographies: Frieda Kwast-Hodapp] (in German). Kommission für geschichtliche Landeskunde in Baden-Württemberg. Stuttgart: Kohlhammer Verlag. pp. 167–168. ISBN 978-3-17-009958-6 – via LEO-BW.
- Ferdinand, Horst (December 1993). "Pianistin aus dem Hegau: Frieda Kwast-Hodapp" [Pianist from the Hegau region: Frieda Kwast-Hodapp] (PDF). Badische Heimat (in German) (4). Freibug: Landesverein Badische Heimat e.V. ISSN 0930-7001 – via Baden State Library. "Including excerpts from Kwast-Hodapp's 155-page, typewritten, unpublished 1934 autobiography from the estate of Fritz Henn. The text is also included in Reger-Studien 5. Beiträge zur Regerforschung. Hrsg. von Susanne Shigihara. Wiesbaden-Leipzig-Paris: Breitkopf & Härtel (1993). (Schriftenreihe des Max Reger-Instituts Bonn. Band X. Note: The PDF page numbers differ from the original."
- "Frieda Kwast-Hodapp ∙ German Radio Recordings 1948". Meloclassics.
- Frisch, Walter (2001). "Reger's Bach and Historicist Modernism". 19th-Century Music. 25 (2–3): 296–312. doi:10.1525/ncm.2001.25.2-3.296. ISSN 0148-2076. JSTOR jj.2001.25.2–3.296.
- Gay, Peter (2001). Weimar culture: the outsider as insider. New York City: W. W. Norton & Company. p. 8. ISBN 978-0-393-32239-2 – via Internet Archive.
- Gerigh, Herbert (1943). "Konzerte, Notizen" [Concerts, Notes]. Musik Im Kriege (in German).
- Goltz, Maren (January 2012). Musiker-Lexikon des Herzogtums Sachsen-Meiningen (1680-1918) [Musicians' Lexicon of the Duchy of Saxe-Meiningen (1680-1918)] (PDF) (in German). Meiningen: Thüringer Universitäts- und Landesbibliothek Jena. p. 209. urn:nbn:de:gbv:547-201200041 – via Digitale Bibliothek Thüringen.
- "Gottbegnadeten Liste". Bundesarchiv Sachakte R 55/20252a [Federal Archives, file R 55/20252a] (in German). Vol. 9. Berlin: Reich Ministry of Public Enlightenment and Propaganda. 1944. p. 10 – via German Federal Archives. "For unregistered users, the signature search R 55/20252a leads to the digitisation of the list."
- Grossherzoglich Mecklenburg-Strelitzscher Offizieller Anzeiger [Grand Ducal Mecklenburg-Strelitz Official Gazette] (in German). 1912. p. 221 – via Google Books – University of California. "Seine Königliche Hoheit der Großherzog haben geruht, der Großherzoglich-Hessischen Kammer-Virtuosin Frau Frieda Kwast-Hodapp in Berlin den Orden für Kunst und Wissenschaft in Gold zu verleihen. Neustreliz, den 23. April 1912."
- Hanau, Heinrich (1903). Dr. Hoch's Conservatorium zu Frankfurt am Main, Festschrift zur Feier seines fünfundzwanzigjährigen Bestehens 1878–1903 [Dr. Hoch's Conservatorium in Frankfurt am Main, commemorative publication for the celebration of its twenty-fifth anniversary 1878–1903] (in German). Im Auftrage des Kuratoriums verfasst. Frankfurt: Druck von Adelmann. p. 41 – via Internet Archive. "Fräulein Frieda Hodapp erhielt bei dem Wettbewerb um den Mendelssohn-Preis ehrenvolle Anerkennung und im folgenden Jahr den ersten Preis."
- Haselböck, Lukas (2000). Analytische Untersuchungen zur motivischen Logik bei Max Reger [Analytical investigations into the motivic logic in Max Reger] (in German). Leipzig: Breitkopf & Härtel. p. 150. ISBN 978-3-7651-0336-0 – via Google Books – University of Michigan. "... am 15. Dezember 1910, bei der das Werk von der Pianistin Frieda Kwast-Hodapp auswendig vorgetragen wurde, muss aber insgesamt als Misserfolg gewertet werden, ..."
- Hiller, Paul (1902). "Köln, 31. Oktober". Neue Zeitschrift für Musik (in German): 614 – via Google Books – University of Michigan. "Zwei Kräfte ersten Ranges, Prof. James Kwast und seine Gattin Frieda Kwast-Hodapp, über deren pianistische Bedeutung und Eigenart ich Näheres nicht zu sagen brauche, eröffneten am 16. Oktober als Träger eines großen Erfolges die Saison an zwei Klavieren .."
- Johannson, Christian (12 July 2023). "Frieda Kwast-Hodapp – Chronology". Classical Pianists.
- Kalcher, Antje; Schenk, Dietmar (2024). "Das Stern'sche Konservatorium der Musik" [Stern Conservatory]. Vor der UdK: die Lehrenden an den Vorgängerinstitutionen der Universität der Künste Berlin – ein Katalog [Before the UdK: the teaching staff at the predecessor institutions of the Berlin University of the Arts – a catalogue]. Schriften aus dem Archiv der Universität der Künste Berlin (in German). Vol. 17 (1 ed.). Berlin: Berlin University of the Arts. p. 338. ISBN 978-3-89462-398-2. "Frieda Kwast-Hodapp 1905/06–1913/14, 1927/28–1930/31 Lehrerin für Klavier"
- Koch, Alexander; Fuchs, Georg, eds. (1901). "Unterhaltungs-Abende im Spiel-Hause" [Entertainment evenings at the playhouse]. Grossherzog Ernst Ludwig und die Ausstellung der Künstler-Kolonie in Darmstadt von Mai bis Oktober 1901: Ein Dokument deutscher Kunst [Grand Duke Ernst Ludwig and the exhibition of the artists' colony in Darmstadt from May to October 1901: A document of German art] (in German). Darmstadt: Koch. p. 238. doi:10.11588/diglit.3770 – via Heidelberg University. "Auch Fräulein Hodap, die glänzend veranlagte Pianistin, ließ sich mehrfach hören und spielte auch u. a. Klavier-Kompositionen Sr. K. H. des Grossherzogs."
- "Kwast-Hodapp, Frieda Elise" (in German) – via LEO-BW.
- Leichtentritt, Hugo (11 April 1906). "Konzert". Neue Zeitschrift für Musik (in German). 73: 336 – via Google Books – University of Minnesota. "... Cmoll-Klavierkonzerts von Graf Hochberg hören: ein glattes, wohlklingendes, geschickt gesetztes Stück. Es wurde vortrefflich gespielt von Frau Frieda Kwast-Hodapp."
- Manildi, Donald. "Research Guides: A Buyer's Guide to Historic Piano Recordings Reissued on Compact Discs: Buyer's Guide E-K". University of Maryland.
- Mastroberardino, Margaret (1 June 1997). "The Last Prisoners of World War II". Pace International Law Review. 9 (1): 315. doi:10.58948/2331-3536.1282. ISSN 2331-3536 – via Institutional repository.
- "Max Reger-Fest" [Max Reger Festival]. Neue Musikzeitung (in German): 360. 1910 – via Google Books – University of Minnesota. "Bei der Eröffnungsfeier des Festes durch den Oberbürgermeister Geh. Rat Dr. Schmieding spielte Frau Kwast-Hodapp mit glänzender Technik op. 81 Variationen und Fuge über ein Thema von Bach."
- "Meßner- und Organistendienst-Besetzungen" [Anton Hodapp] (PDF). Anzeigeblatt für die Erzdiözese Freiburg (in German). 1 March 1893 – via Archdiocese of Freiburg. "Vom Erzdiözensischen Ordinariat ... wurden bestätigt ... Anton Hodapp als Organist an der Pfarrkirche zu Schonach"
- "Musikbriefe, Carlsruhe, Ende Mai" [Music Letters, Karlsruhe, end of May]. Musikalisches Wochenblatt (in German): 427. 1899 – via Google Books – Harvard University. "Frieda Hodapp ... ihren Haupterfolg mit der wirksamen Wiedergabe der Fmoll-Sonate von Brahms erzielte."
- Niemann, Walter (1919). "Die Regerspieler" [The Reger performers]. Meister des Klaviers: Die Pianisten der Gegenwart und der letzten Vergangenheit [Masters of the Piano: The Pianists of the Present and the Recent Past] (in German). Leipzig: Schuster & Loeffler. pp. 125–126 – via University of Michigan.
- Nierlin, Thomas (2022). "„Ein exemplarmäßiger Abzug" von Regers Klavierkonzert in der wiederentdeckten Notensammlung der Pianistin Frieda Kwast-Hodapp" ["An exemplary print" of Reger’s Piano Concerto in the rediscovered music collection of pianist Frieda Kwast-Hodapp]. Forum Musikbibliothek (in German). 43 (3). Ansätze zur Provenienzforschung in der Bibliothek der Hochschule für Musik Hanns Eisler Berlin. "PDF released on 12 December 2023"
- "Notenrollen für Reproduktionsklavier (Duo-Art und Welte-Mignon)" [Rolls for player piano] (PDF). Beethoven House (in German). March 2017. p. 8.
- Oberlaender, Ulrike (2015). "Der Kunstsammler Dr. Otto Krebs, seine Lebensgefährtin Frieda Kwast-Hodapp und das Rittergut Holzdorf" [The art collector Dr. Otto Krebs, his partner Frieda Kwast-Hodapp and the Holzdorf manor] (in German) – via University of Jena. "Dissertation submitted to partially fulfil the requirements for the doctoral degree (Dr. phil.): includes excerpts from Kwast-Hodapp's unpublished 1934 autobiography."
- Offizieller Katalog der oberrheinischen Gewerbeausstellung in Freiburg i. B [Official catalogue of the Upper Rhine Trade Exhibition in Freiburg im Breisgau] (in German). 1887 – via Google Books – Basel University Library. "Anton Hodapp, Hauptlehrer, Schonach bei Triberg."
- "Piano Concerto, Op.114 (Reger, Max)". International Music Score Library Project.
- Phillips, Peter (2024). Bluette: Heritage Grieg, Liszt & Mozart (Digital audio recording). Novus Promusica – via Spotify.
- Roth, Matthias (2008). Ein Rangierbahnhof der Moderne: der Komponist Wolfgang Fortner und sein Schülerkreis 1931–1986: Erinnerungen, Dokumente, Hintergründe, Porträts [A modern-day marshalling yard: the composer Wolfgang Fortner and his circle of students 1931-1986: memories, documents, background information, portraits] (in German). Freiburg: Rombach Verlag. p. 35. ISBN 978-3-7930-9521-7 – via Google Books. "Walter Salmen war der Pianistin begegnet: Ich wurde eines Abends zu Frau Kwast-Hodapp eingeladen, die ein sehr komfortables Leben führte. Ich bekam zunächst das war natürlich 1946 etwas ganz Außergewöhnliches ein Mahl serviert und zwar auf festliche Art und Weise."
- Schipperges, Thomas (2005). Die Akte Heinrich Besseler: Musikwissenschaft und Wissenschaftspolitik in Deutschland 1924 bis 1949 [The Heinrich Besseler File: Musicology and Science Policy in Germany 1924 to 1949] (in German). München, Berlin: Strube Verlag. p. 205. ISBN 978-3-89912-087-5.
- Schmidt, Dörte; Weber, Brigitta (20 January 2017). Keine Experimentierkunst: Musikleben an Städtischen Theatern in der Weimarer Republik [No experimental art: Musical life at municipal theaters in the Weimar Republic] (in German). Berlin: Springer-Verlag. p. 256. ISBN 978-3-476-03567-7. "1. Sinfoniekonzert: 9.10.1923, Stadttheater M, Ltg: Rudolf Schulz-Domburg, Sol.: Frieda Kwast-Hodapp (Berlin). Hans Pfitzner: Klavierkonzert, Es-Dur, op. 31"
- Schrader, Bruno (25 March 1915). "Berliner Brief" [Berlin Letter]. Neue Zeitschrift für Musik (in German): 108 – via HathiTrust - University of California. "Die stark überschätzte Pianistin Frieda Kwast-Hodapp ... Uraufführung von M. Regers Variationen und Fuge über ein Thema von G. Ph. Telemann (Op. 134) ... Der Komponist hat hier ... lang und inhaltsleer geschrieben."
- Schreiber, Ottmar; Schreiber, Ingeborg, eds. (1981). "Berliner Lokal-Anzeiger" [Berlin Local News]. Max Reger in seinen Konzerten: Rezensionen [Max Reger in his concerts: Reviews] (in German). Vol. 3. Bonn: Dümmler. p. 289. ISBN 978-3-427-86291-8 – via GoogleBooks – University of Michigan.
- Schulz, Marcel (1 May 1906). "Lettre de Berlin". Revue musicale de Lyon (in French): 819 – via Gallica. "Nous nous contenterons de mentionner la première exécution d'un concerto en do mineur pour piano avec orchestre, du baron de Hochberg, ancien intendant des théâtres royaux. Richard Strauss dirigeait l'orchestre et l'œuvre nouvelle fit brillamment ressortir les qualités de virtuose d'une excellente pianiste: Frieda Kwast-Hodapp."
- Schwalb, Michael (15 March 2018). Max Reger: Der konservative Modernist [Max Reger: The Conservative Modernist] (in German). Regensburg: Verlag Friedrich Pustet. ISBN 978-3-7917-6126-8 – via Google Books. "... war trotz der glänzenden Leistung der Solistin Frida Kwast-Hodapp ein von der Kritik hämisch kommentierter Misserfolg."
- Schweizer, Claudia (2015). "Kwast-Hodapp, Frieda". Sophie Drinker Institut (in German).
- Smith, Julia; Friedberg, Gerda (1963). Master pianist: the career and teaching of Carl Friedberg. New York: Philosophical Library. p. 73 – via Google Books – University of Michigan.
- Stein, Fritz (1939). Max Reger (in German). Wiesbaden: Akademische Verlagsgesellschaft Athenaion. p. 55 – via Google Books – New York Public Library. "Ein Kritiker des Leipziger Tagesblattes sprach von einer „neuen Fehlgeburt der in Inzucht verkommene Reger-Muse" ..."
- Steinberg, Michael (1998). The concerto: a listener's guide. New York: Oxford University Press. p. 383. ISBN 978-0-19-510330-4 – via Google Books.
- "Studierendenliste Hoch'sches Konservatorium in Frankfurt a. M." [Student list of the Hoch Conservatory in Frankfurt] (PDF) (in German). Sophie Drinker Institut. p. 135. "Sept. 1892 – Juli 1899"
- "The Welte Mignon Mystery: Max Reger". Tacet Musikproduktion.
- Türck, Verena (2017). "Weibliche Lehrkräfte in den Personal- und Vorlesungsverzeichnissen der Universität Heidelberg von 1900 bis 1945" [Female teaching staff in the personnel and lecture directories of the University of Heidelberg from 1900 to 1945]. In Richter, Susanne (ed.). Wissenschaft als weiblicher Beruf? [Science as a female profession?]. Schriften aus dem Archiv der Universität der Künste Berlin (in German). Vol. 3 (1 ed.). Berlin: heiBOOKS. p. 11. doi:10.11588/heibooks.66.57 – via Universitätsmuseum Heidelberg. "Frieda Kwast-Hodapp, Fakultät: Phil., Eintrittsdatum: 26.5.1943 Zeitraum: WS 1943/44–WS 1944/45"
- "Variations and Fugue on a Theme by Telemann, Op.134 (Reger, Max)". International Music Score Library Project.
- "Vermischte Mitteilungen und Notizen" [Messages and notes]. Musikalisches Wochenblatt (in German): 596. 1898 – via Google Books – University of Michigan. "Der diesjährige Felix Mendelssohn Bartholdy-Staatspreis wurde an ... Frieda Hodapp (Clavierspiel) vergeben."
- Vierhaus, Rudolf (3 May 2011). Kraatz – Menges. Deutsche Biographische Enzyklopädie (DBE) (in German). Vol. 6. Berlin: De Gruyter Brill. p. 178. ISBN 978-3-11-094027-5 – via Google Books.
- von Schmoller, Gustav (1902). "Die historische Lohnbewegung" [The historical wage development] (PDF). Sitzungsberichte der Königlich Preussischen Akademie der Wissenschaften zu Berlin. (in German): 135 – via Repositorium der Berlin-Brandenburgischen Akademie der Wissenschaften. "Average 1897 annual income for Berlin-based metalworker: 1832... for shoemaker: 569. PDF page count: 8"
- Woolf, Jonathan (June 2022). "Frieda Kwast-Hodapp (piano) German Radio Recordings 1948 Meloclassics MC1059". MusicWeb-International.
- Zentner, Wilhelm (1966). "Frieda Kwast-Hodapp: eine Pianistin aus dem Hegau" [Frieda Kwast-Hodapp: a pianist from the Hegau region] (PDF). Hegau (Zeitschrift für Geschichte, Volkskunde und Naturgeschichte des Gebietes zwischen Rhein, Donau und Bodensee) (in German). 21–22: 217–219. ISSN 0438-9034 – via Hegau Geschichtsverein e.V.

== External sources and further readings ==
- Ferdinand, Horst (1990). Ottnad, Bernd (ed.). "Badische Biographie: Frieda Kwast-Hodapp" [Baden Biographies: Frieda Kwast-Hodapp] (in German). Kommission für geschichtliche Landeskunde in Baden-Württemberg. Stuttgart: Kohlhammer Verlag. pp. 167–168. ISBN 978-3-17-009958-6 – via LEO-BW.
- Ferdinand, Horst (December 1993). "Pianistin aus dem Hegau: Frieda Kwast-Hodapp" [Pianist from the Hegau region: Frieda Kwast-Hodapp] (PDF). Badische Heimat (in German) (4). Freibug: Landesverein Badische Heimat e.V. ISSN 0930-7001 – via Baden State Library. "Including excerpts from Kwast-Hodapp's 155-page, typewritten, unpublished 1934 autobiography from the estate of Fritz Henn. The text is also included in Reger-Studien 5. Beiträge zur Regerforschung. Hrsg. von Susanne Shigihara. Wiesbaden-Leipzig-Paris: Breitkopf & Härtel (1993). (Schriftenreihe des Max Reger-Instituts Bonn. Band X. Note: The PDF page numbers differ from the original."
- Johannson, Christian (12 July 2023). "Frieda Kwast-Hodapp – Chronology". Classical Pianists.
- Nierlin, Thomas (2022). "„Ein exemplarmäßiger Abzug" von Regers Klavierkonzert in der wiederentdeckten Notensammlung der Pianistin Frieda Kwast-Hodapp" ["An exemplary print" of Reger’s Piano Concerto in the rediscovered music collection of pianist Frieda Kwast-Hodapp]. Forum Musikbibliothek (in German). 43 (3). Ansätze zur Provenienzforschung in der Bibliothek der Hochschule für Musik Hanns Eisler Berlin. "PDF released on 12 December 2023"
- Oberlaender, Ulrike (2015). "Der Kunstsammler Dr. Otto Krebs, seine Lebensgefährtin Frieda Kwast-Hodapp und das Rittergut Holzdorf" [The art collector Dr. Otto Krebs, his partner Frieda Kwast-Hodapp and the Holzdorf manor] (in German) – via University of Jena. "Dissertation submitted to partially fulfil the requirements for the doctoral degree (Dr. phil.): includes excerpts from Kwast-Hodapp's unpublished 1934 autobiography."
- Schweizer, Claudia (2015). "Kwast-Hodapp, Frieda". Sophie Drinker Institut (in German).
- "The Busoni Correspondence with Frieda Kwast-Hodapp". www.busoni-nachlass.org (in German). Archived from the original on 9 February 2026.
- Zentner, Wilhelm (1966). "Frieda Kwast-Hodapp: eine Pianistin aus dem Hegau" [Frieda Kwast-Hodapp: a pianist from the Hegau region] (PDF). Hegau (Zeitschrift für Geschichte, Volkskunde und Naturgeschichte des Gebietes zwischen Rhein, Donau und Bodensee) (in German). 21–22: 217–219. ISSN 0438-9034 – via Hegau Geschichtsverein e.V.
