= Lieberson =

Lieberson is an Anglicized version of the German–Jewish surname Liebersohn. Notable people with the surname include:

- Goddard Lieberson (1911–1977), American music industry executive
- Lorraine Hunt Lieberson (1954–2006), American mezzo-soprano
- Peter Lieberson (1946–2011), American classical composer
- Samuel Lieberson (1881–1965), Odessa-born composer
- Sanford Lieberson (born 1936), American film producer
- Stanley Lieberson (1933–2018), Canadian-born American sociologist
