= James Kwast =

Dutch-German pianist (1852–1927)

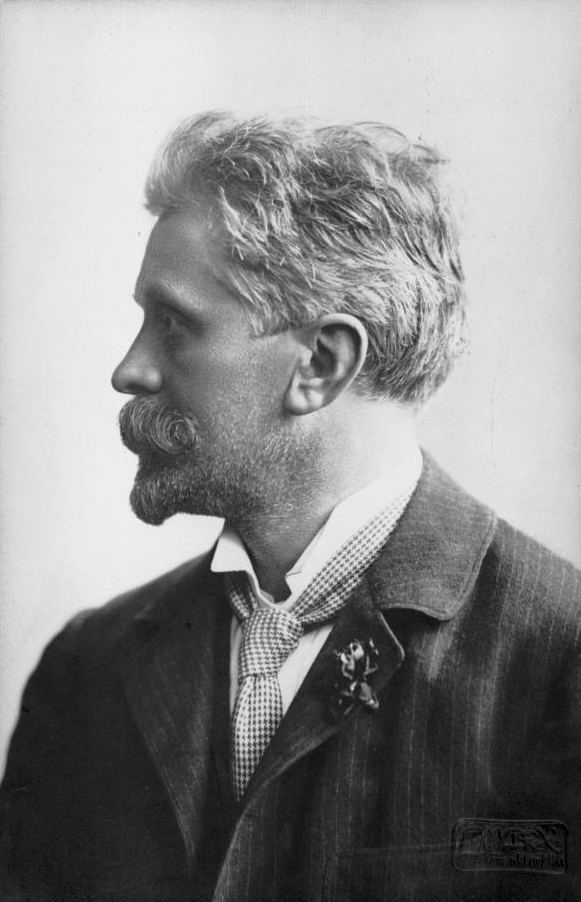
James Kwast

James Kwast (23 November 1852 – 31 October 1927) was a Dutch-German pianist and renowned teacher of many other notable pianists. He was also a minor composer and editor.

== Biography ==
Jacob James Kwast was born in Nijkerk, Netherlands, in 1852. After studies with his father and Ferdinand Böhme in his home country, he became a student of Carl Reinecke at the Leipzig Conservatory, and had later studies in Berlin under Theodor Kullak, and Brussels under Louis Brassin and François-Auguste Gevaert. He settled in Germany in 1883, initially as a teacher at the Cologne Conservatory, and later at the Hoch Conservatory in Frankfurt and the Klindworth-Scharwenka (1903–06) and Stern conservatories in Berlin. His students included Else Schmitz-Gohr and Walter Braunfels.

He participated in the first performance in England of Brahms’s Piano Trio in C minor, with Carl Fuchs and Carl Deichmann.

Clara Schumann played her last public concert in Frankfurt on 12 March 1891. The last work she played was Brahms's Variations on a Theme by Haydn, in the piano-duet version, with Kwast as her partner.

He died in Berlin in 1927, aged 74.

== Teacher ==
His reputation as a teacher reached far and wide. The list of his students includes:

- Frieda Kwast-Hodapp
- Walter Braunfels (whom he introduced to the music of Hans Pfitzner)
- Carl Friedberg
- Ilse Fromm-Michaels
- Percy Grainger
- Otto Klemperer (who studied under Kwast at three institutions and credited him with the whole basis of his music development)
- Ethel Leginska
- Walter Burle Marx
- Hans Pfitzner (his future son-in-law)
- Edward Potjes
- Edith Weiss-Mann
- Hermann Zilcher

== Compositions ==
He wrote a piano concerto and various piano pieces, as well as piano transcriptions of Bach organ works. He edited the keyboard works of Joseph Haydn.

== Personal life ==
His first wife was Antonie (“Tony”), the daughter of Ferdinand Hiller. Their daughter Mimi Kwast married his pupil, the composer Hans Pfitzner.

He later married a pupil of his, Frieda Hodapp, who was a successful pianist. She was the dedicatee of Max Reger's F minor Concerto, which she premiered in 1910, and the soloist in the first Berlin performance of Busoni's Concertino, BV 292. She also premiered Reger's Variations and Fugue on a Theme of Telemann, Op. 134, on 14 March 1915 at the Leipzig Gewandhaus. The work was dedicated to her husband.

His brother was the conductor Jan Albert Kwast (Quast).

== Sources ==
- Grove's Dictionary of Music and Musicians, 5th ed (1954), ed. Eric Blom, Vol IV, p. 880
