= Mendelssohn Scholarship =

Award

The Mendelssohn Scholarship (German: Mendelssohn-Stipendium) refers to two scholarships awarded in Germany and in the United Kingdom. Both commemorate the composer Felix Mendelssohn, and are awarded to promising young musicians to enable them to continue their development.

== History ==
Shortly after Mendelssohn's death in 1847, a group of his friends and admirers formed a committee in London to establish a scholarship to enable musicians to study at the Leipzig Conservatoire, which Mendelssohn had founded in 1843. Their fundraising included a performance of Mendelssohn's Elijah in 1848, featuring Jenny Lind. The link between London and Leipzig fell through, resulting in two Mendelssohn Scholarships.

== Mendelssohn Scholarship in Germany ==
In Germany, the Mendelssohn Scholarship was established in the 1870s as two awards of 1500 Marks, one for composition and one for performance, for any student of a music school in Germany, and was funded by the Prussian state as part of an arrangement under which the Mendelssohn family donated the composer's manuscripts to the state. The first recipient was the composer, Engelbert Humperdinck, who used it to travel to Italy in 1879.

Funded by the Jewish Mendelssohn family, the award was discontinued by the Nazis in 1934. It was revived by the Ministry of Culture of the former East Germany in 1963, in the form of two annual prizes for composition and for performance. It is now awarded by the Prussian Cultural Heritage Foundation.

=== Recipients ===
Winners of the German Mendelssohn Scholarship
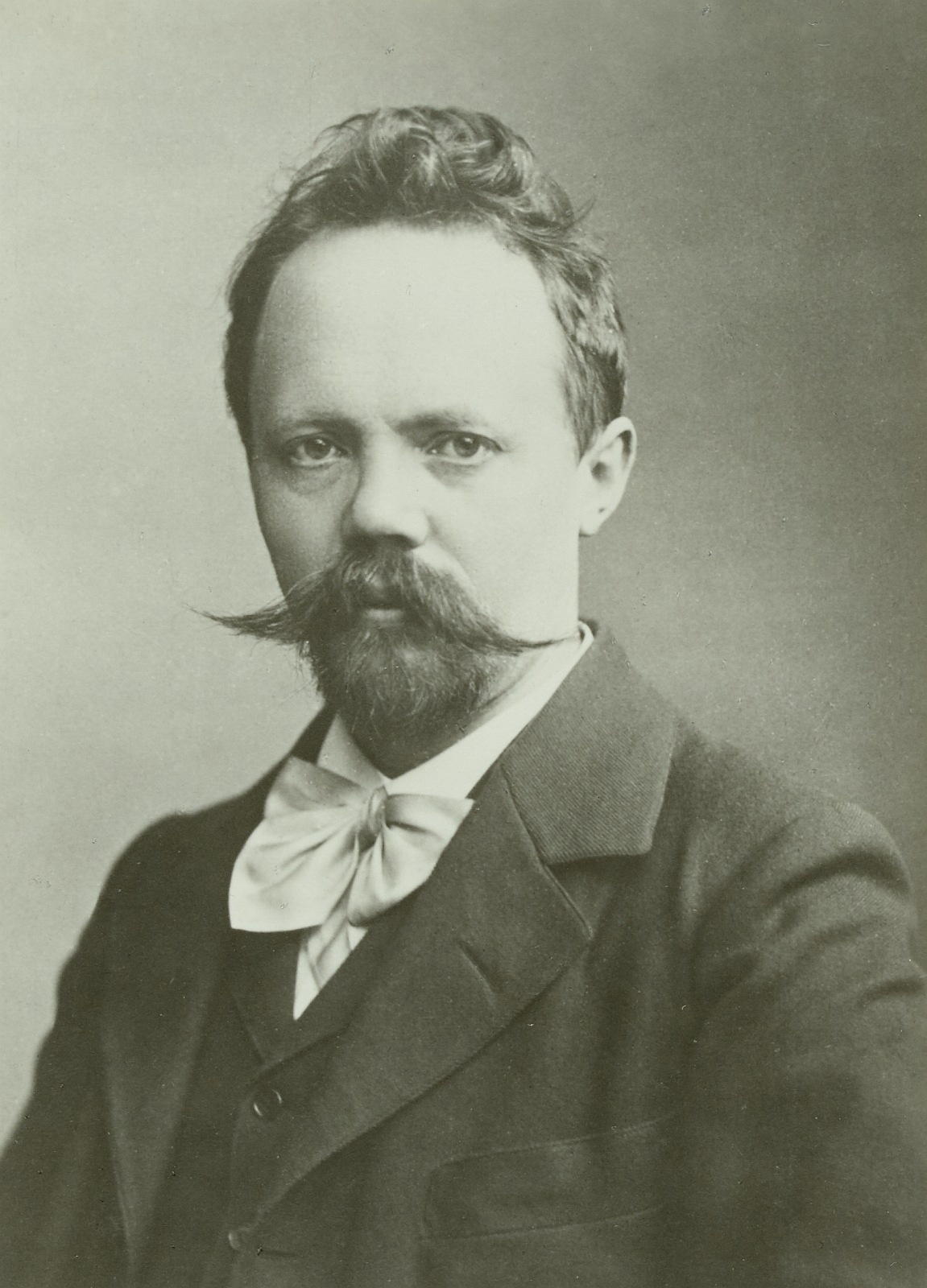
Humperdinck

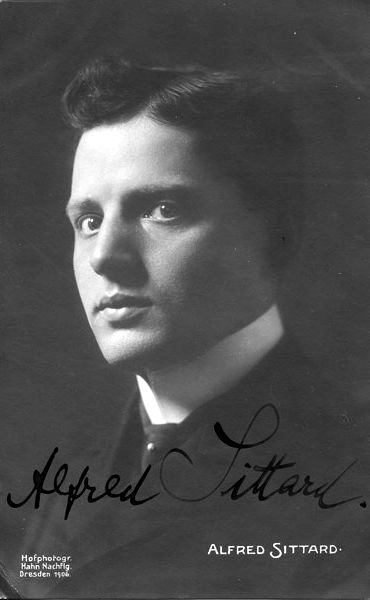
Sittard

As well as Humperdinck, famous recipients include the pianist Wilhelm Kempff and the composer Kurt Weill.

The following is an incomplete chronological list of recipients of the German Mendelssohn Scholarship.

==== 1879 to 1934 ====
- 1879 – Engelbert Humperdinck, Josef Kotek, Johann Kruse, Ernst Seyffardt
- 1880 – Marie Soldat, Carl Wolf (composition)
- 1881 – Bernhard Stavenhagen, Andreas Moser, Johann Kruse, Ethel Smyth, Philipp Wolfrum, Adam Alex, Sophie Braun, Fritz Kaufmann (composition), Gotthold Knauth (piano), Alfred Sormann (piano)
- 1882 – Marie Soldat (violin), Martin Gebhardt (organ), Elsa Harriers (voice), Marie Harzer (voice), Karl Prill (violin), Arnold Mendelssohn (composition), Carl Schneider (composition)
- 1883 – Alex Adam, Albert Gorter (composition), Marie Harzer (voice), Hedwig Meyer (piano), Martha Schwieder (piano), Ernst Seyffardt (composition), Georg Stoltzenberg (composition), Elise Tannenberg (piano), Gabriele Wietrowetz (violin), Margarethe Witt (violin)
- 1884 – Carl Grothe (composition), Anna Haasters (piano), Solma Krause (piano), Max Puchat (composition), Carl Schneider (composition)
- 1885 – Gabriele Wietrowetz, Ida Beckmann (violin), Marie Mette (voice), Fanny Richter (piano), Georg Stoltzenberg (composition), Margarete Will (piano)
- 1886 – Charles Gregorowitsch (violin; also 1887, 1888), Hermann Kindler (cello), Geraldine Morgan (violin; also 1887), Bernhard Pfannstiel (organ; also 1887, 1888), Olga Radecki (piano)
- 1887 – Waldemar von Baußnern, Heinrich van Eyken, Peter Fassbänder, Felix Odenwald
- 1888 – Fanny Richter (piano), Percy Sherwood (piano; also 1889), Eduard Behm (also 1890, 1891), Mathieu Neumann, Ewald Strasser, Lucy Campbell (cello; also 1890)
- 1890 – Bram Eldering, Carl Markees (violin), Hermann von Roner (violin), Elisabeth Rouge (piano), August Schmidt (piano) E. van Dooren (also 1892), Martin Grabert, Friedrich Koch, Max Oppitz (clarinet), Carl Piening (cello)
- 1891 – Rudolf Lentz (violin; also 1892, 1893), Mina Rode (violin; also 1894), Betty Schwabe (violin), Felice Kirchdorffer (piano)
- 1892 – Helene Jordan (voice), Rosa Schindler (violin), Lina Mayer (piano)
- 1893 – Carl Thiel, Leo Schrattenholz, Louis Saar, Nellie Kühler (piano), Amelia Heineberg (piano), Olga von Lerdahely (violin), Kati Macdonald (piano), Lizzie Reynolds (piano)
- 1894 – Heinrich Bendler (piano), Dietrich Schäfer (piano), Toni Tholfus (piano), May C. Taylor (composition)
- 1895 – Elsie Stanley Hall,
- 1896 – Paul Juon, Walter Bachmann (piano), Juanita Brockmann (violin; also 1899, 1904)
- 1889 – Percy Sherwood
- 1897 – piano: Frieda Hodapp; violin: Eleonore Jackson, singing and violin: Ferdinand Schleicher
- 1898 – piano: Frieda Hodapp, Marie Bender, Heniot Levy, Wilhelm Backhaus; violin: Johannes Palaschko
- 1900 – Karl Klingler
- 1901 – Elly Ney
- 1902 – Alfred Sittard
- 1902 – Ignatz Waghalter
- 1904 – Eugenie Stoltz (honorable mention)
- 1904 – Mae Doelling (1888–1965), piano
- 1905 – Eugenie Stoltz
- 1906 – Sara Gurowitsch
- 1909 – Samuel Lieberson
- 1910 & 1913 – Ernst Toch
- 1912 – Licco Amar
- 1913 – Hans Bassermann, Mischa Levitzki, Max Trapp
- 1913 & 1918 – Erwin Schulhoff
- 1915 –
- 1917 – Wilhelm Kempff, Emil Peeters
- 1918 – Pancho Vladigerov
- 1919 – Kurt Weill
- 1920 – Pancho Vladigerov
- 1925 – Berthold Goldschmidt, Max Rostal
- 1926 – Ignace Strasfogel, Ernst Pepping
- 1928 – Hans Humpert
- 1928 – Grete von Zieritz
- 1928 – Wilhelm Stross
- 1929 – Herbert Marx
- 1930 – Ludwig Hölscher
- 1931 – Kurt Fiebig, Roman Totenberg, Artur Balsam
- 1932 – Norbert von Hannenheim, Harald Genzmer
- 1933 – Werner Trenkner, Bernhard Heiden, Karlrobert Kreiten
- 1935 – Fritz Werner, Johannes Schneider-Marfels

==== Since 1963 ====
- 1965 – Peter Herrmann
- 1966 – Walter Steffens
- 1974/75 – Gabriele Kupfernagel
- 1976/77 – Reinhard Wolschina
- 1978/80 – Walter Thomas Heyn
- 1981 – Bernd Franke
- 1985 – Rolf Fischer
- 1987 – Olaf Henzold
- 1988 – Steffen Schleiermacher
- 1988/89 – Caspar René Hirschfeld
- Carola Nasdala
- Michael Schönheit
- Michael Stöckigt
- Matthias Henneberg

== Mendelssohn Scholarship in the United Kingdom ==
Winners of the UK Mendelssohn Scholarship

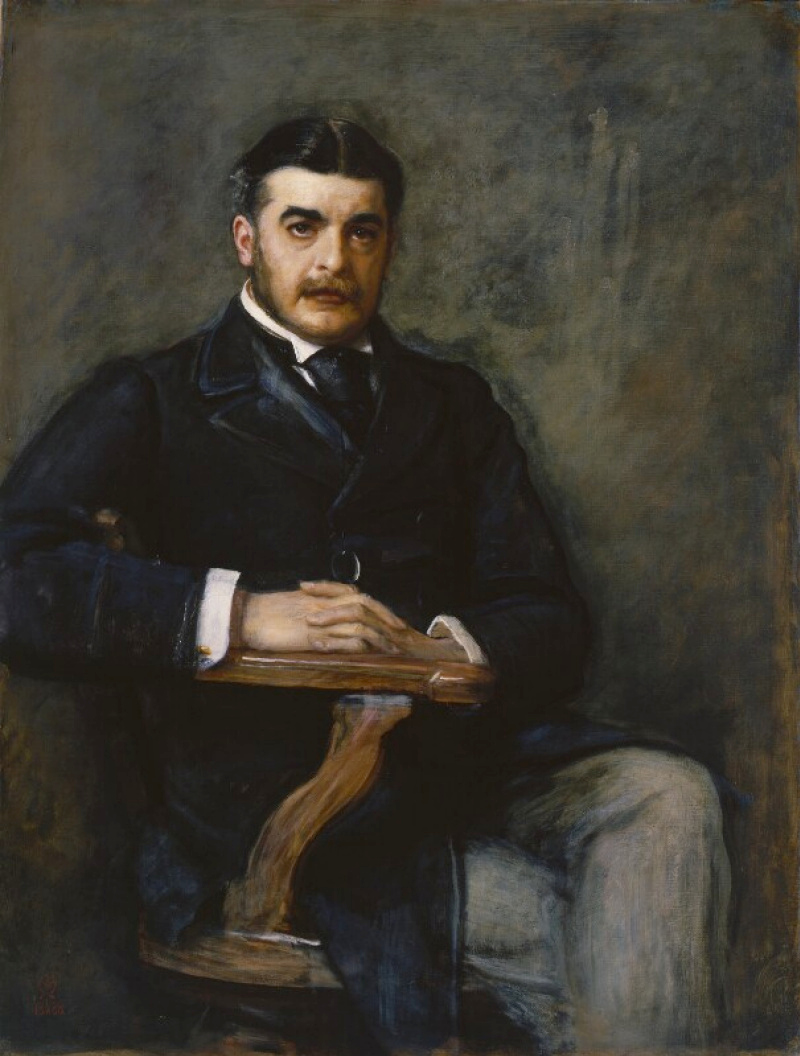
Sullivan

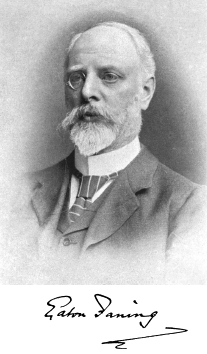
Faning

d'Albert

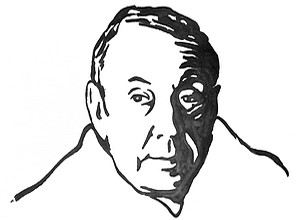
Arnold

The funds raised at the 1848 concert were invested and allowed to accumulate until 1856, when Arthur Sullivan was elected as the first scholar. Since then it has been awarded from time to time, administered by the Mendelssohn Scholarship Foundation, which is linked to the Royal Academy of Music. The foundation was created by a trust deed in 1871. Its trustees include the composers Anthony Payne and Justin Connolly, and the principal of the Royal Academy of Music, Jonathan Freeman-Attwood; and its charitable objects are "For the education of musical students of both sexes in pursuance of the intentions of the founders".

=== Recipients ===
Recipients include the composers Frederick Corder, George Dyson, Malcolm Arnold and Kenneth Leighton.

The following is an incomplete chronological list of recipients of the British Mendelssohn Scholarship.

- 1856 – Arthur Sullivan
- 1865 – Charles Swinnerton Heap
- 1871 – William Shakespeare
- 1873 – Eaton Faning
- 1875 – Frederick Corder
- 1879 – Maude Valérie White
- 1881 – Eugen d'Albert
- 1884 – Marie Wurm
- 1890 – S P Waddington
- 1895 – Christopher Wilson
- 1899 – Percy Hilder Miles
- 1905 – George Dyson
- 1909 – Eric William Gritton
- 1912 – Joseph Alan Taffs
- 1916 – Philip Levi
- 1921 – Arthur Lawrence Sandford
- 1923 – Percy Purvis Turnbull
- 1927 – Godfrey Sampson
- 1929 – David Moule-Evans
- 1932 – Ivor Walsworth
- 1935 – Daniel Jones
- 1948 – Malcolm Arnold
- 1951 – Kenneth Leighton
- 1954 – Francis Burt
- 1956 – John Exton
- 1960 – David Blake
- 1962 – Richard Stoker
- 1964 – Patric Standford
- 1968 – Brian Ferneyhough
- 1969 – Jonathan Lloyd
- 1972 – Nicola LeFanu
- 1974 – Richard Blackford
- 1979 – Lionel Sainsbury
- 1985 – James Harley
- 1986 – Javier Alvarez
- 1988 – Martin Butler
- 1992 – Philip Cashian
- 1994 – Luminita Spinu
- 1997 – Richard Causton
- 2000 – Luke Bedford
- 2002 – Cheryl Frances-Hoad
- 2004 – Oliver Searle
- 2006 – Nadja Plein
- 2008 – Steven Daverson
- 2010 – Samuel Bordoli
- 2012 – Christian Mason
- 2014 – Arne Gieshoff
- 2016 – Nicholas Moroz
- 2018 – Nicholas Morrish
- 2020 – Angela Slater
- 2021 – Hugo Bell
- 2022 – Amelia Clarkson
- 2023 – Jasper Dommett
- 2024 – Mingdu Li
- 2025 - Po Hang Yuen (Special award to Holly Gowland)
