= Piano Concerto (Reger) =

1910 composition by Max Reger

- by Max Reger
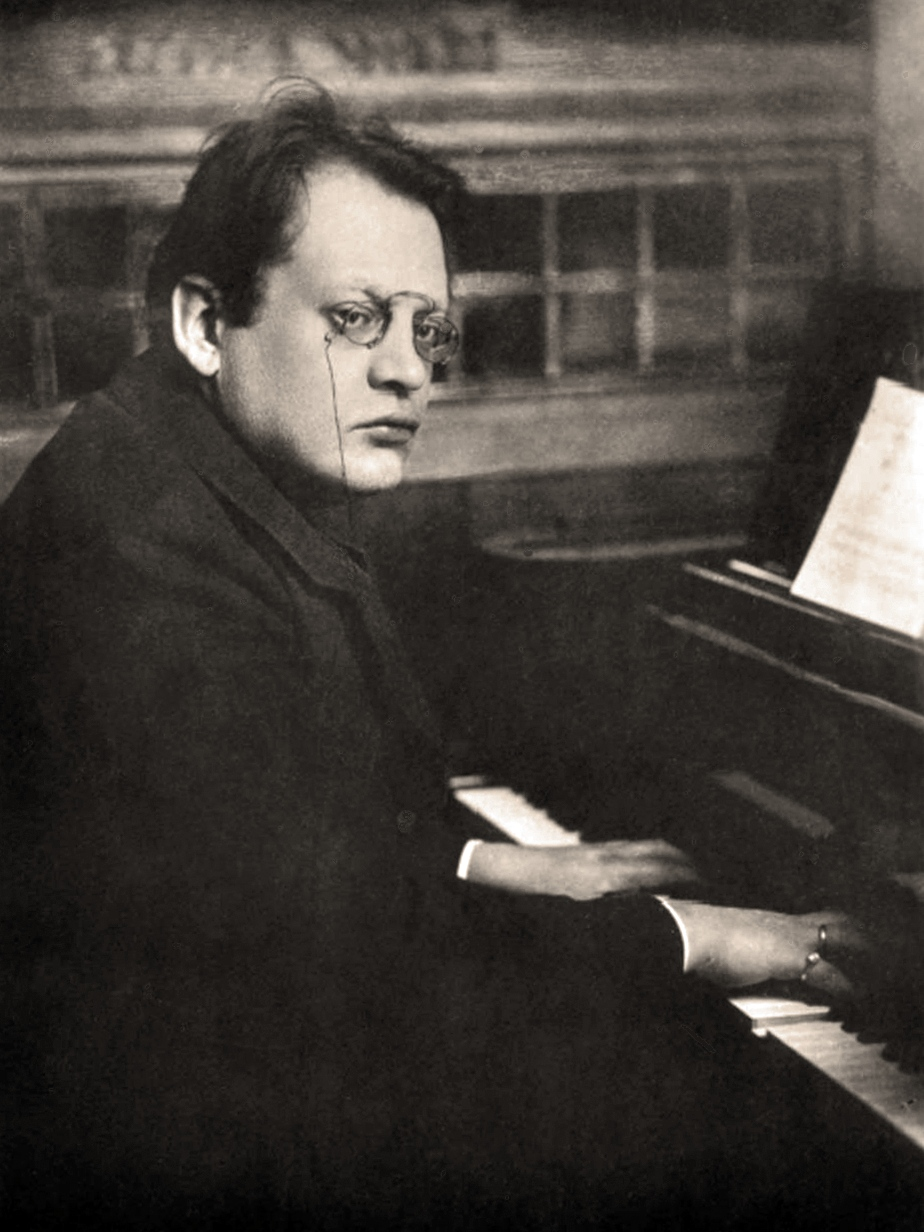
- Reger playing the piano, c. 1910
- Key: F minor
- Opus: 114
- Dedication: Frieda Kwast-Hodapp
- Performed: 15 December 1910: Leipzig
- Published: 1910

The Piano Concerto in F minor, Op. 114, is a concerto for piano and orchestra composed by Max Reger in Leipzig in 1910. He dedicated the work to Frieda Kwast-Hodapp, who premiered it in Leipzig on 15 December 1910 with the Gewandhausorchester conducted by Arthur Nikisch. The difficult composition has been rarely performed and recorded. Pianists who have tackled it range from the American Rudolf Serkin, who first recorded it in 1959, to Markus Becker who was the soloist in an award-winning recording in 2017.

== History ==
When Reger was in Dortmund for a three-day festival dedicated to his music in 1910, the pianist Frieda Kwast-Hodapp played his Variations and Fugue on a Theme by J.S. Bach, Op. 81. Reger, who had already promised her a piano concerto in Leipzig in 1906, repeated the promise then. He began the composition in May 1910, and finished the first movement by the end of June. His publisher, Bote & Bock, received the work on 22 July.

The composition, comprising a full score, parts, and a piano reduction for piano four hands that Reger devised himself, were published in September 1910. It was dedicated to Frieda Kwast-Hodapp. The autograph manuscript was lost in the destruction of the publisher's Berlin headquarters in 1943, but the dedication was apparently: "This beastly stuff belongs to Frau Kwast. The Chief Pig, Max Reger, confirms it." She was the soloist in the first performance in Leipzig on 15 December 1910, with the Gewandhausorchester conducted by Arthur Nikisch.

== Structure and music ==
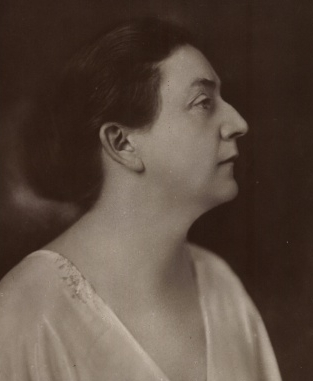
Frieda Kwast-Hodapp

The piano concerto in F minor is traditionally structured in three movements:

1. Allegro moderato
2. Largo con gran espressione
3. Allegretto con spirito

The duration of the work is given as 39 minutes, with the first movement around 18 minutes.

The first movement opens, like Brahms's First Piano Concerto, with a timpani roll and orchestral fanfares. The movement is composed in an "overarching sonata form", with a symphonic approach treating piano and orchestra as equals. Consequently, it has no cadenza. Reger's music is harmonically advanced, deliberately avoiding the key of F minor. The pianist enters in forceful octaves, followed by dramatic dialogue between soloist and orchestra. The second theme is lyrical in contrast.

The second movement, marked Largo con gran espressione (slow with great expression), begins with the piano alone. Reger quoted melodies from Lutheran chorales, including "Wenn ich einmal soll scheiden", which is audible by oboe and first violins, "O Welt, ich muss dich lassen", and, towards the end of the movement, "Vom Himmel hoch", again in the oboe. The "chorale fragments" form part of an original texture.

The final movement has been described as of "quirky character" of an "angular" theme, which is again treated in challenging virtuosity. Another "stormy" dialogue of piano and orchestra is finally resolved in an "affirmative conclusion" in F major.

== Performance and recording ==
Reger's piano concerto has been compared to Busoni's Piano Concerto as a monumental piece that is extremely difficult to play. According to Süddeutsche Zeitung, Reger's concerto therefore "shares the fate" of Busoni's, and is rarely performed. It was first recorded by Rudolf Serkin with the Philadelphia Orchestra conducted by Eugene Ormandy in 1959. Pianist Amadeus Webersinke made a recording in 1973, with Dresdner Philharmonie conducted by Günther Herbig; it was reissued in 2002 on CD, and in 2006 in a collection of Reger's orchestral works. Gerhard Oppitz recorded it in 1988 with the Bamberger Symphoniker conducted by Horst Stein. It was recorded in 2010 by Marc-André Hamelin with the Rundfunk-Sinfonieorchester Berlin conducted by Ilan Volkov, combined with the Burleske by Richard Strauss. A reviewer noted that Hamelin successfully characterised the challenging material, and named the pianist's playing of the "extremely demanding pyrotechnics" "absolutely astonishing".

In 2016, on the occasion of the centenary of Reger's death, Peter Serkin played the concerto with the American Symphony Orchestra conducted by Leon Botstein at Carnegie Hall, New York City. It was understood also as "a poetic continuation of his late father’s work". The concerto was recorded live in 2017 by pianist Markus Becker with the NDR Radiophilharmonie conducted by Joshua Weilerstein. A reviewer of the Süddeutsche Zeitung wrote that Becker mastered the virtuoso aspects of dense chords and octave runs "mit Löwenpranken" (transl. with a lion's paws), but also exposed the extreme sensitivity and beauty of the second movement. It earned him the Opus Klassik for the best concerto recording from the 19th century of 2019.
