= Percy Sherwood =

Percy Sherwood (23 May 1866 - 15 May 1939) was a German-born composer and pianist of English nationality.

He was born in Dresden, the son of a lecturer in English at Dresden University, John Sherwood, and a German mother Auguste Koch, who had been a successful soprano. After his studies with Theodor Kirchner, Felix Draeseke and Herman Scholtz, Sherwood became a major figure in the music life of Dresden before the First World War. In 1889 he won the Mendelssohn Prize for his Requiem. He was first a teacher, then professor, at the Dresden Conservatory from 1893 and 1911 respectively. His own students included Dora Pejačević. Shortly before war broke out in 1914 he and his wife abandoned their Dresden villa and returned to England, where he was almost unknown. Thereafter he made a living as a private teacher in London and travelling weekly to Oxford and Cambridge. He died in London.

Sherwood’s compositions come from the classic German tradition. They include five symphonies (Nos. 4 and 5 are lost) and several concertos (two each for cello, piano and violin), as well as chamber music (including two cello sonatas and at least six string quartets) and solo piano works. Modern recordings have started to appear.

== Selected works ==
- Funf Kleine Stücke for cello and piano (1886–87)
- Piano Concerto No. 1 in C minor (1887)
- Symphony No. 1 in C major (1887)
- Requiem, for chorus and orchestra (1889)
- Sextet for piano, horn, 2 violins, viola and cello (1889)
- Cello Concerto No. 1 (1890, rev. 1893)
- Cello Sonata No. 1, Op. 10 (1891)
- Symphony No. 2 in B minor (1892)
- Sechs Lieder, Op. 2 (1893)
- Sonata for Two Pianos (1896)
- Serenade for Orchestra No. 1 in F major (1897)
- Miniatures, 10 piano pieces, Op. 9 (1898)
- Drie Romanzen for piano, Op. 11 (c.1899)
- Drei Stücke for cello and piano, Op. 19 (c.1900?)
- Cello Sonata No. 2, Op. 15 (1900)
- Trio for piano, oboe and horn (1901)
- Cello Concerto No. 2 in D minor (1902)
- Violin Concerto in F major (1902)
- Suite for Two Pianos (c.1901-02)
- Symphony No. 3 in E♭ major (1905-7)
- Violin Sonata No. 1 in c, Op. 12 (1906)
- Piano Quintet (1907)
- Concerto for Violin, Cello and Orchestra (1908)
- Five Songs from the Golden Treasury, Op. 16 (1908)
- Humoresques for piano, Op. 20 (1910)
- Suite for two violins, Op. 23 (1913)
- Idyls for piano (1920)
- Serenade for Orchestra No. 2 (1920)
- String Quartet No. 6 (1922–30)
- Suite for String Orchestra with flute, oboe, clarinet, and horn (1925-6)
- Piano Concerto No. 2 (1932–33)
