= Franz Ries =

German violinist and composer (1846 - 1932)

Franz Ries (7 April 1846 in Berlin – 20 June 1932 in Naumburg) was a Romantic German violinist and composer, son of Hubert Ries, the younger brother of Ferdinand Ries. He studied at the Paris Conservatory. He also worked in the publishing business.

== Career ==
His talent formed under the direction of his father and in the Paris Conservatory under the violinist Joseph Massart, but after a short, brilliant career, he abandoned it suffering under a nerve problem, and settled in Dresden as a music retailer in 1875, where he still occasionally composed and performed on the violin. Then, from 1884 until his death, he lived as a co-owner of the company R. & Erler Berlin.

== Compositions ==
- Lieder, Op. 1
  1. An eine Jungfrau
- Lieder, Op. 3
  3. Wenn die Lurk treckt
- Lieder, Op. 4
  1. Lebe wohl!
  4. Keen Sorg för den Weg
- String Quartet No. 1 in D minor, Op. 5 (publ. 1866)
  1. Allegro poco agitato
  2. Scherzo. Molto vivace
  3. Adagio non troppo (E♭ major)
  4. Finale. Allegro molto appassionato
- (String Quartet No. 2, Op. ?)
- 6 Lieder, Op. 6
- 3 Characterstücke, for Violin and Piano, Op. 7
- 6 Lieder, Op. 8
- Lieder, Op. 10
  1. Nachtlied
- Lieder, Op. 12
  3. Das verlassene Mägdlein
  4. Wandervögel
- Träumbilder (3 Klavierstücke), Op. 13
- 3 Zweistimmige Gesänge, Op. 14
- 3 Lieder, Op. 16 (alto/baritone)
- 3 Lieder, Op. 17
- 4 Romances, for Violin and Piano, Op. 20 (publ. 1860)
  1. Abschied
  2. Erinnerung
  3. Wehmuth
  4. Schlummerlied
- 4 Lieder, Op. 25 (publ. 1876)
  1. Das alte Lied
  2. Bitte
  3. Die blauen Frühlingsaugen
  4. Der schwere Abend
- Kriegslied, Lied, Op. ? (text Emanuel Geibel)
- Suite No. I in G minor, for Violin and Piano, Op. 26 (to Joseph Joachim - publ. 1877)
  1. Allemanda (Maestoso)
  2. Intermezzo (Allegretto assai vivace)
  3. Andante (Con moto)
  4. Minuetto (Moderato)
  5. Introduzione e Gavotta (Lento - Tempo di Gavotta)
- Suite No. II in F major, for Violin and Piano, Op. 27 (publ. 1877)
  1. Praeludium (Allegro risoluto, ma moderato)
  2. Canon (Adagio ma non troppo - Allegro con fuoco)
  3. Scherzo (Molto vivace)
  4. Romanze (Andante sostenuto)
  5. Burleske (Vivace - Allegretto molto moderato)
- String Quintet (for 2 violins, 2 violas and cello) in C minor, Op. 28 (publ. 1878)
  1. Allegro poco agitato
  2. Intermezzo. Vivace
  3. Andante con variazioni
  4. Finale. Allegro assai
- Dramatische Ouverture in E minor, for full Orchestra, Op. 30 (publ. 1878)
- 6 Lieder, Op. 31 (publ. 1879)
  1. Es muss was Wunderbares sein
  2. Du bist die Herrlichste von Allen
  3. Abends auf der See
  4. Wenn ich auf dem Lager liege
  5. Veilchen freue dich mit mir
  6. Abschied
- Suite No. III in G major, for Violin and Piano, Op. 34 (publ. 1898)
  1. Moderato
  2. Bourrée
  3. Adagio
  4. Gondoliera
  5. Perpetuum mobile
- Suite No. IV in D minor, for Violin and Piano, Op. 38 (publ. 1890)
  1. Intrada
  2. Aria
  3. Menuetto
  4. Capriccio
  5. Sarabande
  6. Gavotte
- Lieder, Op. 39
  1. Gestillte Sehnsucht
  2. Himmlische Zeit, o selige Zeit!
- Lieder, Op. 40
  1. Bleibe, Abend will es werden
  2. Wo du hingehst
- Lieder, Op. 41
  1. Seliger Glaube
  2. Vergebens!
  3. Das schlafende Kind
  6. Ihr Lied
- Tragödie, Lied Op. 42
- La Capricciosa, for Violin and Piano (to Ibolyka Gyarfas - publ. 1925)

== Arrangements ==
- Album-Blätter (Album leaves), "Melodies from Old Masters", 24 Pieces for Violin/Cello and Piano (arr. 1871-1884)
  - Book I (1-5):
    - 1. Pergolesi, G.B., Siciliano (Gm.)
    - 2. Durante, F., Arie (Dm.)
    - 3. Ries, Ferdinand, Romanze (G)
    - 4. Rameau, J.P., Gavotte (D) a. Der Ruhmestempel
    - 5. Hasse, J.A.P., Arie (Cm.)
  - Book II (6-10):
    - 6. Rameau, J.P., Menuett u. Passepieds (E) a. Castor u. Pollux
    - 7. Tartini, G., Larghetto (Gm.)
    - 8. Bach Air and Gavotte
    - 9. Lully Gavotte and Rondeau
    - 10. Martini (G.B.) Gavotte
  - Book III (11-15):
    - 11. Leclair (Jean M.) Sarabande u. Tambourin
    - 12. Gluck (Chr. W.) Ballet aus: Orpheus
    - 13. Paradies, P. Dom., Canzonetta (G)
    - 14. Duport, J.P., Romanze (C)
    - 15. Tenaglia, A.F., Aria (Fm.)
  - Book IV (16-20):
    - 16. Méhul, E.H., Menuett (A)
    - 17. Gluck, Chr. W., Largo (Gm.)
    - 18. Haydn, J., Serenade (C)
    - 19. Hasse, J.A.P., Canzona (Gm.)
    - 20. Gluck, Chr. W., Ballet u. Gavotte (A)
  - Book V (21-24):
    - 21. Mozart, W.A., Gavotte in F
    - 22. Lotti, G.B., Arietta in G
    - 23. Boccherini, L., Adagio in A
    - 24. Mozart, W.A., Ländler in G
