= Samuel Lieberson =

Composer

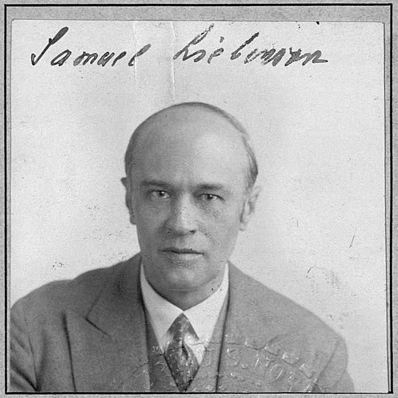
Samuel Lieberson

Samuel Achillos Lieberson (July 19, 1881 – July 30, 1965) was a physician, award-winning composer and professor of music theory.

== Biography ==
Lieberson was born in Odessa to Achilles Lieberson and Sophie Herzberg. He received a medical degree from the University of Odessa in 1907 but then left for Berlin to study music at the Master School for Composition under Friedrich Gernsheim until 1909, when he was awarded the prestigious Mendelssohn Scholarship for his Concerto for Violin and Orchestra. Leiberson then spent 1910 at the University of Music and Theatre Leipzig as student of Arthur Nikisch in conducting.

He returned to Berlin in 1911 as conductor at the Vienna Volksoper opera house and joined faculty at the Stern Conservatory, where he taught the class "Elementarlehre und Harmonielehre" in the Russian language for students who only spoke Russian. He married Anna Pressman in February 1916. During World War I, he served as a medical officer on the Turkish front with the rank of Lieutenant Colonel in the Imperial Russian Army.

Lieberson returned to Berlin after the war and in 1920 was appointed director of the New Conservatory, where he was a professor of composition. He also contributed to music periodicals, including Die Musik and Allgemeine Musikzeitung.

Lieberson immigrated to the United States with his wife in August 1930, and settled in Chicago. He was already well-established in the local music community by 1933 as a guest conductor with Eric DeLamarter and the Chicago Civic Orchestra, the training orchestra established by Frederick Stock and sponsored by the Chicago Symphony Orchestra.

Lieberson enjoyed success with his symphony In a Winter Garden that was performed multiple times in 1935 and 1936 by the Chicago Symphony Orchestra with Stock conducting. In June 1935, he was awarded an honorary Doctorate of Music from Sherwood Music School in Chicago. He was on faculty at DePaul University School of Music as Professor of Composition and was appointed Chairman of the Department of Theory by 1936. Lieberson was naturalized as a United States citizen in 1936.

During World War II, Lieberson and his musical compositions were blacklisted in the Third Reich in the notorious Lexikon der Juden in der Musik, by musicologists Herbert Gerigk and Theo Stengel. Lieberson continued teaching in the U.S. for many years with colleagues including Sergei Tarnowsky and Richard Czerwonky. Lieberson was selected as a judge for the 1941 Sigma Alpha Iota music fraternity String Awards Competition, along with Leo Sowerby and Czerwonky. For the closing concert of the Chicago Symphony Orchestra's 50th season in 1941, Frederick Stock invited 12 local composers, including Lieberson, to contribute a variation of the folk theme "El-A-Noy", derived from "Illinois," appearing in Carl Sandburg's The American Songbag. Leiberson and his wife moved to California in 1947.

== In a Winter Garden ==
In a Winter Garden is Lieberson's most successful composition. It is a "description in sound of a vaudeville show" in four movements, starting with "Backstage", a fugue; "The Musical Clown", a theme with variation; "The Dancing Prima Ballerina", a rondo; and "The Juggler", a scherzo. A complete performance runs about 25 minutes and is scored for four flutes, three oboes, three clarinets, three bassoons, four horns, three trumpets, three trombones, one tuba, timpani, celesta, two harps, piano and a full complement of strings, including violin I, violin II, viola, cello, and bass. The work was originally commissioned in 1932 by Patricia Gordon, co-founder of the Chicago-based cosmetic company Princess Pat, and was awarded first place at the 1934 Hollywood Bowl composers' competition. Frederick Stock was a judge at the 1934 Hollywood Bowl competition and brought the work back to Chicago for a premiere with the Chicago Symphony Orchestra in 1935. In the program notes accompanying the first Chicago performance, Lieberson wrote that during "a musical evening at the Gordon home my hostess described her idea of a composition that would give the high-lights of vaudeville. The idea appealed to me, and, at my request, Mrs. Gordon jotted down her conception of the material to be embodied in the music." This anecdote was repeated in Radio Mirror, a popular magazine of that time. The piece was very well received. A review of the 1935 Chicago premiere was published in the weekly Musical Courier, stating:

Quite different in its structure is the Lieberson suite, which made a palpable hit… An original composer, he has written music that bubbles with wit and modernistic harmonies that tickle the ear and delight the mind. The subtitles, Back of the Stage, The Musical Clown, Dancing Prima Ballerina and The Juggler, are unnecessary as the music depicts the various moods admirably and graphically. The work is beautifully orchestrated and was received vociferously by the audience which bestowed upon the composer ovations that recalled him time and time again to the stage.

Other reviews of the suite were equally supportive, with another critic noting that in its "suggestion of the joys of de luxe vaudeville it classifies as excellent descriptive music." The work was also called "a brilliant piece of musical writing…" The second movement has been described as a clumsy fellow on stage "trying many kinds of musical instruments. He pretends complete ignorance of music. Then he takes the flute and plays a simple, naïve tune. Variations on this tune follow – first a sentimental waltz and then a comic march to close the clown's musical act." Two of the four movements were broadcast on the radio as part of the General Motors Concerts series under the direction of Ernö Rapée in 1936. The last documented performance was in 1941 by the Cincinnati Symphony Orchestra. There are no known recordings. In a Winter Garden was dedicated to Mrs. Gordon.

== Selected works ==
=== Music ===
- Praeludium (1903)
- Concerto for Violin and Orchestra (1909)
- Symphony, F sharp minor (1910)
- Violin concerto (1913)
- Cordelia, comic opera (1921)
- Au Bord de la Mer
- In a Winter Garden, suite for grand orchestra (1934)
- String Quartet in F Minor
- Sonata for Piano and Violin

=== Publications ===
- Manual of functional harmony and key to 216 exercises. Los Angeles, California: W.F. Lewis, 1946.
- Lieberson, SA. "Wagner und die russische Musik." Allgemeine Musikzeitung, 57;10 (March 7, 1930). 223–225.
- Lieberson, SA. "Alexander Glasunoff." Allgemeine Musikzeitung, 57;32/33 (August 8, 1930). 779–782.
- Lieberson, SA. "Romantische Musik als Seelenbild der faustischen Kultur." Die Musik, XXII, 1930, 661–670.
- Lieberson, SA. Chicago concert review. Die Musik, XXIII, 1931, 611–612.
