= LEO-BW =

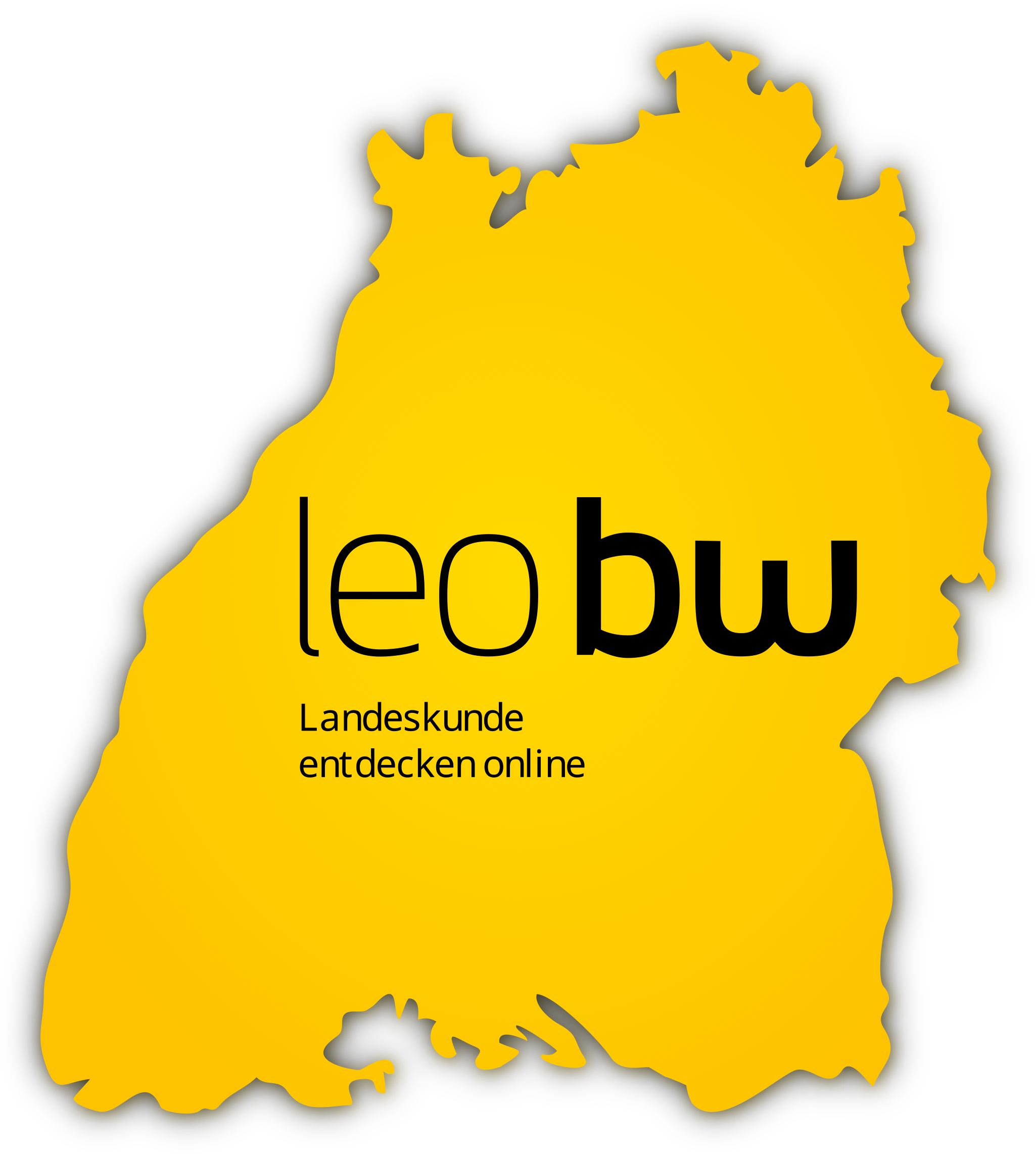
Logo

Landeskunde Entdecken Online (better known as LEO-BW) is a regional online information system for Baden-Württemberg, Germany. It is owned by the Baden-Württemberg State Archives.

== Content ==
=== Atlas ===
In 2015, the Historical Atlas of Baden-Württemberg was incorporated into LEO-BW.

=== German archives ===
On February 22, 2018, the Südwestdeutsche Archivalienkunde (Southwest German Archival Records) was incorporated into LEO-BW, linking millions of documents into LEO-BW. The oldest of these documents come from the Middle Ages.

=== Weimar Republic ===
On November 8, 2017, the topic "From the Monarchy to the Republic" was released. It contained 900,000 documents of the Weimar Republic.

== History ==
The plans for LEO-BW were first initiated in 2010 order to celebrate the 60th birthday of the State of Baden-Württemberg. However, the website wasn't opened until April 25, 2012.
