= Horn Sonata =

A Horn Sonata is a sonata for horn. Horn sonatas include:

- Horn Sonata (Beethoven)
- Horn Sonata No. 1 (Danzi)
- Horn Sonata No. 2 (Danzi)
