= Cannabich =

Cannabich is a surname. Notable people with this surname include:

- Carl Cannabich (1771–1806), German composer and violinist
- Christian Cannabich (1731–1798), German violinist and composer
- Rose Cannabich (1764–1839), German classical pianist
