= Danzi =

Danzi or D'Anzi is a surname. Notable people with the surname include:

- Francesca Lebrun, née Danzi (1756 – 1791), 18th-century a German singer and composer
- Franz Danzi (Franz Ignaz Danzi) (1763 – 1826), German cellist, composer and conductor
  - Danzi Quintet, a Dutch wind quintet
- Margarethe Danzi, née Marchand (1768 – 1800), German composer and soprano; wife of Franz
- Gianni Danzi (1940 – 2007), an Italian Roman Catholic Archbishop of the Territorial Prelature of Loreto
- Giovanni D'Anzi (1906, Milan – 1974), Italian songwriter
- Carmelo D'Anzi (born 1956, Messina), Italian-American football coach and player
