= E minor =

Minor scale based on E

- Relative key: G major
- Parallel key: E major
- Dominant key: B minor
- Subdominant key: A minor

Component pitches
- E, F♯, G, A, B, C, D

E minor is a minor scale based on E, consisting of the pitches E, F♯, G, A, B, C, and D. Its key signature has one sharp, on the F. Its relative major is G major and its parallel major is E major.

The E natural minor scale is:

Changes needed for the melodic and harmonic versions of the scale are written in with accidentals as necessary. The E harmonic minor and melodic minor scales are:

Much of the classical guitar repertoire is in E minor, as this is a very natural key for the instrument. In standard tuning (E A D G B E), four of the instrument's six open (unfretted) strings are part of the tonic chord. The key of E minor is also popular in heavy metal music, as its tonic is the lowest note on a standard-tuned guitar.

== Scale degree chords ==
The scale degree chords of E minor are:

- Tonic – E minor
- Supertonic – F-sharp diminished
- Mediant – G major
- Subdominant – A minor
- Dominant – B minor
- Submediant – C major
- Subtonic – D major

== Notable compositions ==
- Charles-Valentin Alkan
  - Le festin d'Ésope, Op. 39, No. 12, from 12 etudes in all the minor keys
- Johann Sebastian Bach
  - Prelude and Fugue in E minor, BWV 548
  - English Suite No. 5, BWV 810
  - Partita for keyboard in E minor, BWV 830
  - Suite in E minor for solo lute, BWV 996
  - Bourrée in E minor, BWV 996
- Ludwig van Beethoven
  - String Quartet No. 8
  - Piano Sonata No. 27
- Johannes Brahms
  - Symphony No. 4
  - Cello Sonata No. 1
  - Fantasies, Op. 116 (5th movement)
  - Four Pieces for Piano, Op. 119 (2nd movement)
- Frédéric Chopin
  - Nocturne in E minor
  - Piano Concerto No. 1
  - Waltz in E minor
  - Étude Op. 25, No. 5 "Wrong Note"
  - Prelude Op. 28, No. 4 "Suffocation"
- Franz Danzi
  - Horn Sonata Op. 44
- Gaetano Donizetti
  - String Quartet No. 18
- Antonín Dvořák
  - Symphony No. 9 (From the New World)
  - Piano Trio Op. 90
  - String Quartet No. 4
  - Slavonic Dance No. 2, Op. 46
  - Slavonic Dance No. 2, Op. 72
- Edward Elgar
  - Cello Concerto
  - Sea Pictures
  - Serenade for Strings
  - String Quartet
  - Violin Sonata
- Louise Farrenc
  - Piano Trio in E minor, Op. 45
- Edvard Grieg
  - Piano Sonata
- George Frideric Handel
  - Messiah (overture)
  - Concerti grossi, Op. 6, No. 3
- Joseph Haydn
  - Symphony No. 44 (Trauer)
- Ignaz Holzbauer
  - Flute Concerto in E minor
- Margaret Ruthven Lang
  - Rhapsody in E minor, Op. 24
- Feliks Janiewicz
  - Violin concerto No. 5
- Karol Lipiński
  - Violin Concerto No. 3, Op. 24
- Franz Liszt
  - Malédiction, S. 121
- Felix Mendelssohn
  - Preludes and Fugues, Op. 35 (first pair)
  - Violin Concerto
  - String Symphony No. 3 in E minor, MWV N 3
  - String Quartet in E minor, Op. 44
  - Fugue in E minor, MWV W24
  - Albumblatt, Op. 117
- Franz Xaver Wolfgang Mozart
  - Rondo for Flute and Piano
- Wolfgang Amadeus Mozart
  - Violin Sonata No. 21
  - Die Alte, K. 517
- Pietro Nardini
  - Sonata No. 6 for two violins and bass
- Niccolò Paganini
  - Caprice No. 3
  - Caprice No. 15
- Sergei Prokofiev
  - Montagues and Capulets
- Ferdinand Ries
  - Violin Concerto, Op. 24
- Franz Schubert
  - Piano Sonata in E minor, D. 566
  - Piano Sonata in E minor, D. 769A
  - Fugue in E minor for four hands, D. 952
- Dmitri Shostakovich
  - Piano Trio No. 2
  - Symphony No. 10
- Jean Sibelius
  - Symphony No. 1, Op. 39
- Bedřich Smetana
  - Die Moldau
  - String Quartet No. 1
- Sergei Rachmaninoff
  - Moments musicaux, Op. 16, No. 4
  - Symphony No. 2
  - Vocalise, Op. 34, No. 14
- Maurice Ravel
  - Le tombeau de Couperin
- Franz Xaver Richter
  - Flute Concerto in E minor
- Nikolai Rimsky-Korsakov
  - Scheherazade
- Pyotr Ilyich Tchaikovsky
  - Symphony No. 5
- Carl Maria von Weber
  - Horn Concertino
  - Piano Sonata No. 4 in E minor, Op. 70
- Ralph Vaughan Williams
  - Symphony No. 6
  - Symphony No. 9
- Giuseppe Verdi
  - String Quartet
- Antonio Vivaldi
  - Violin Concerto, Op. 11/2 RV 277

== See also ==
- Key (music)
- Major and minor
- Chord (music)
- Chord notation

No.	Flats		Sharps	
No.	Major	minor	Major	minor
0	C	a	C	a
1	F	d	G	e
2	B♭	g	D	b
3	E♭	c	A	f♯
4	A♭	f	E	c♯
5	D♭	b♭	B	g♯
6	G♭	e♭	F♯	d♯
7	C♭	a♭	C♯	a♯
8	F♭	d♭	G♯	e♯
