= Franzl =

Franzl or Fränzl is both a given name and surname. Notable people with the name include:

== Fränzl family of musicians ==
- Ferdinand Fränzl, German violinist, composer, and conductor
- Ferdinand Rudolph Fränzl, German trumpeter and viola player
- Ignaz Fränzl, German violinist and composer

== Others ==
- Franzl Lang, German yodler
- Friederich Franzl, Austrian footballer
