= Lorenzo Piani =

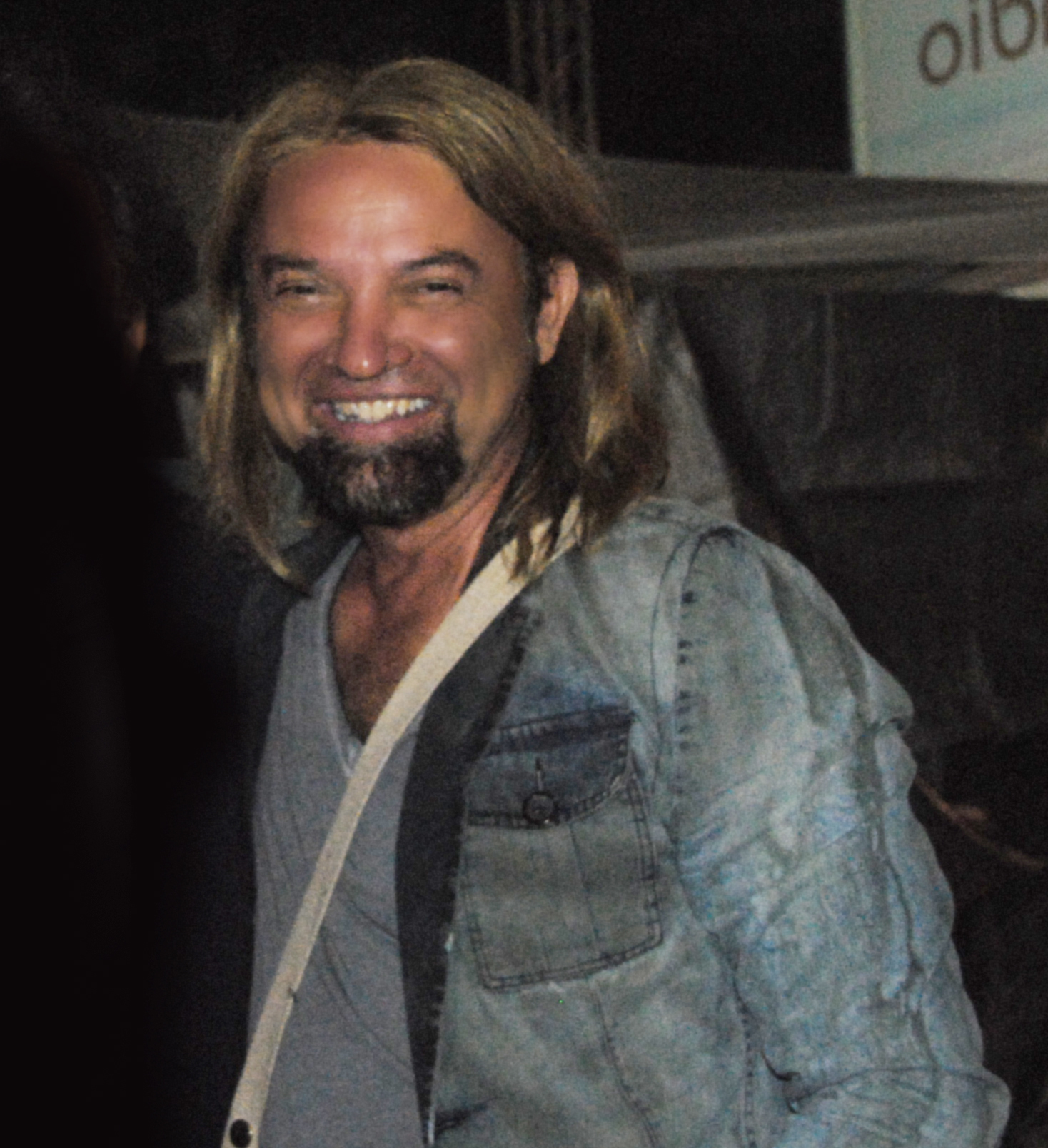
- Lorenzo Piani 2012

Background information
- Born: Lorenzo Piattoni; 27 September 1955; Giulianova, Italy
- Origin: Italy
- Died: 14 August 2016 (aged 60) Rimini, Italy
- Genres: Pop; pop rock; Latin pop
- Occupation: Musician
- Instruments: Piano; keyboards
- Years active: 1972–2016
- Label: SNDMUSIC
- Website: www.lorenzopiani.com

Lorenzo Piattoni (27 September 1955 – 14 August 2016), known professionally as Lorenzo Piani, was an Italian singer and songwriter.

== Biography ==
After studying classical piano at the Rossini Conservatory in Pesaro, he released a single. As a musician, he has performed in many countries, including for King Hussein of Jordan. In 1983 he returned to Italy, where he has worked as a composer for the RAI TV. He was involved in programs such as "tandem" and "sul Vediamoci 2" presented by Rita Dalla Chiesa and Fabrizio Frizzi. At the same time he wrote the song "Forza Rimini" for the football club of the city. In the spring of 1990 he released his first album "Sognatori Erranti" on the label NAR. The song Vecchio Poeta was produced and performed with the classic Scarlatti Orchestra of Italy. Lorenzo Piani for seven years, then moved to Scandinavia (Denmark, Norway, Sweden), where he played with his band at clubs. In 1995, he published the RTI Music CD single The Train, and in 1998 the RTI Music album VIVO feeling. In 2000, Lorenzo Piani began a new adventure as artistic director of Balla Bella Radio Festival Talent Scout project. In 2008, he had an important collaboration with Brian Auger, who played the organ for the album sorpresi Dal Vento. In 2011, he released his fifth album, entitled La Filosofia del CAM. CAM stands for food, love and music. A massive radio promotion brought the song for weeks in the Indie Music Charts.

Piani released an album called 10 Ten on 14 July 2013. The album features songs that reflect the philosophy of life as well as the significance of optimism, creativity and human emotions. The work is a result of Piani's musical activities and collaborations with different European artists. His album features female vocalists from various countries singing duets with Piani in various languages.

For English-speaking listeners, young singer Nirah recorded a song with Piani called The Soul. Maria Villalón, a Spanish artist sang with Piani on a song called Mudar, which promotes hope and encourages people to get rid of negativity and enjoy life. Stephanie, a singer in German and Austrian languages, sang together with Piani Grande Amore, an artistic task for the Austrian singer. The jazz music also has its place in Piani's album. The last song 10 reflects Piani's vision of ten being the perfect number.

The instrumental album Shades of Music was released by Lorenzo Piani on 27 March 2015.

On 20 November 2015 the single "SENZA UN SORRISO" was released. This release is a track from a new art project, conceived by Lorenzo Piani, POP CLASSIC. It is a crossover project, a musical contamination that originates from an array of pop and classical counterpoint develops. His partner in this project is a star of the opera world, the Sicilian soprano Desirée Rancatore. The soprano Desirée Rancatore's voice is interwoven with the dough soft and persuasive voice of Lorenzo Piani, and the theme comes to life through harmonies typical of classical music. The texts are structured with a book specially written, as well as in the tradition of Italian opera.

On 14 August 2016 his official site announced his death.

== Discography ==
=== 45 rpm ===
- 1983 "45 giri Dolce Annie e Andrea un amico“ EMI Group

=== 33 rpm ===
- 1990 "33 giri e MC Sognatori Erranti“ Nar/Dischi Ricordi

=== Cd Single ===
- 1992 "Cd Singolo Hvor sod du var“ SNDMUSIC/Audiosparx
- 1995 "Cd Singolo Il Treno“ RTI Music
- 2015 "Cd Singolo Senza Un Sorriso" SNDMUSIC

=== Cd Album ===
- 1998 "CD Album VivoFeelings“ RTI Music
- 2001 "CD Album New version VivoFeelings“ Sony Music
- 2008 "CD Album Sorpresi dal Vento“ SNDMUSIC
- 2011 "CD Album La Filosofia del CAM“ SNDMUSIC
- 2013 "CD Album 10 Ten“ SNDMUSIC
- 2015 "CD Album Shades of Music“ SNDMUSIC
- 2016 "Sensations" SNDMUSIC

=== DVD Album ===
- 2006 "DVD Album Un Salto E Volo Lungometraggio musicale“ SNDMUSIC/EXA Media

=== Compilations ===
- 2011 "Italian Voices 1, 2, 3 und 4“ SNDMUSIC/Audiosparx
- 2011 "Sunny Pop Music vol.1 u. 3“ SNDMUSIC/Audiosparx
- 2011 "Summefeeling Popmusic vol.1 u. 3“ SNDMUSIC/Audiosparx
- 2011 "Pop International – Italo Vol 1“ SNDMUSIC/Audiosparx
- 2011 "Summer in the City – Popmusic Vol.1 u. 4“ SNDMUSIC/Audiosparx
- 2011 "Latin Pop Vocal 1 u. 3“ SNDMUSIC/Audiosparx
- 2011 "Summer Dreams 2 u. 3“ SNDMUSIC/Audiosparx
- 2011 "Fantasy Music 3“ SNDMUSIC/Audiosparx
- 2011 "Easy Listening Male Voices 1“ SNDMUSIC/Audiosparx
- 2011 "Family Music 3 2011“ SNDMUSIC/Audiosparx
- 2011 "European Rock and Pop 2“ SNDMUSIC/Audiosparx
- 2011 "Fantasy Music 4" SNDMUSIC/Audiosparx
- 2012 "Summer Evening 2“ SNDMUSIC/Audiosparx
- 2012 "Inspired by Shakira 2011“ SNDMUSIC/Audiosparx
- 2014 "My Ballad" Wantreez Music
- 2014 "Pop Band Music" Wantreez Music
- 2015 "Vintage Plug 60: Session 66 - Pop, Rock, vol.5" SNDMUSIC
- 2015 "Inspired by Shakira - The Best in Latin Pop" SNDMUSIC
- 2016 "Summer & Pop Dance Ver.2" Wantreez Music
- 2016 "Midnight Blue" Wantreez Music
- 2017 "Gloomy European Song" Wantreez Music
- 2017 "Chill Tourist Set" Wantreez Music
- 2017 "Watching Stars Playlist" Wantreez Music
- 2017 "New Work out Plan" Wantreez Music
- 2017 "Afternoon Break" Wantreez Music
- 2017 "Latin & Samba Club" Wantreez Music
- 2017 "Good Music for You Vol.1" Wantreez Music
- 2017 "Great Pop Music Vol.1" Wantreez Music
- 2017 "Great Pop Music Vol.3" Wantreez Music
- 2017 "No Genre Just Music Vol.1" Wantreez Music
- 2017 "Boys n Girls Pop Vol.1" Wantreez Music
- 2017 "Boys n Girls Pop Vol.2" Wantreez Music
- 2017 "Late Night Pop" Wantreez Music
- 2017 "Sadness & Pop Ballad" Wantreez Music
- 2017 "Lovely Valentine's Day Pop" Wantreez Music
- 2017 "Tus Mejores Días"
