= Margarethe Danzi =

German composer and soprano (1768–1800)

Maria Margarethe Danzi (née Marchand; 1768 – 11 June 1800) was a German composer and soprano.

Maria Margarethe Marchand was born in the Holy Roman Empire. Some sources give her birthplace as Munich and others Mannheim, and it was possible that the family was on tour in Frankfurt on the date of her birth. She was the daughter of the singer, actress and dancer Magdalena Brochard Marchand and Theobald Hilary Marchand, director of the National Theatre of Mannheim.

Margarethe studied music and composition in Munich with Franziska Lebrun and in Salzburg with Leopold Mozart. She apprenticed in supporting roles and debuted in 1787 at the age of 12 at the Mannheim Court Theater, performing the title role in The Youth by Johann Jakob Engel.

In 1790, she married conductor and composer Franz Danzi, and performed with him as prima donna of the troupe Domenico Guardasoni on European concert tours. After 1796, Margaret also performed as prima donna at the Munich Court Theatre. She died in Munich of pulmonary disease.

== Works ==
=== List of works ===
- Six Sonatas for Keyboard (ca. 1786) — lost (Leopold Mozart unsuccessfully tried to make Torricella publish these sonatas)
- Three sonatas for pianoforte with violin obbligato, Op. 1 (E♭, B♭, E), published by Falter (1801)
- Marche de Marseillois varié for piano, Op. 2, published by Falter (1802)
- Variations for piano (Andante from Franz Danzi's Piano Sonata in F, Op. 3 — published by Falter, ca. 1800)

=== Modern editions ===
- Margarethe Danzi. Sonate für Violine und Klavier; op. 1,1. Hrsg. und Vorw. von Robert Münster. — Giebing: Katzbichler, [1967]. — 21 S. + 1 St. — (Varie musiche di Baviera).
- Margarethe Danzi. Sonata I in E♭ major for violin and piano. Ed. by Barbara Harbach. — Pullman, WA: Vivace Pr. (VIV 905), c 1996. — 28 S. + 1 St.
- Margarethe Danzi. Sonata II in B♭ major for violin and piano. Ed. by Barbara Harbach. — Pullman, WA: Vivace Pr. (VIV 906), c 1996. — 20 S. + 1 St.
- Margarethe Danzi. Sonata III in E major for violin and piano. [Ed. by Barbara Harbach.] — Pullman, WA: Vivace Pr. (VIV 907), c 1996. — 25 S. + 1 St.
- Three Marias: three eighteenth century sonatas by Maria Barthélemon [No. 4], Maria Danzi [Op. 1 No. 1], Maria Hester Park [Op. 13 No. 2]. Ed. Susau [sic] Eileen Pickett. — Bryn Mawr, PA: Hildegard Publ. (09763), 1997. — VII, 51 S. + 1 St.
- Maria Margarethe Marchand Danzi. Sonata terza pour le pianoforte (with violin obbligato). [Ed. Caroline Cunningham]. — Bryn Mawr, PA: Hildegard Publ., 1998. — [28] S. + 1 St.

== Sources ==
- Carl Cannabich. Obituary for Margarethe Danzi in: Allgemeine Musikalische Zeitung, november 1801.
