= Rosine Lebrun =

German actress and opera singer (died 1855)

Rosine Lebrun (April 29, 1783, Munich — June 5, 1855, Munich), also known by her married name Rosine Stentzsch, was a German actress and opera singer who was a member of the Lebrun family of musicians.

== Life and career ==
Born in Munich, Rosine Lebrun was the daughter of composer and oboist Ludwig August Lebrun and composer and soprano Francesca Lebrun. Both she and her sister, the pianist and composer Sophie Lebrun, studied piano with Johann Andreas Streicher and singing with their uncle, Franz Danzi; a composer, conductor, and cellist.

Lebrun began her performance career on the opera stage prior to her marriage to the actor K.A.A. Stentzsch on November 3, 1800. Thereafter she was mainly active as a stage actress in plays as a member of the Munich theatre company from 1801 until her retirement in 1830; only periodically appearing in operas.

Rosine's daughter, Charlotte Stentzsch, was also an actress and member of the Munich theatre company from 1822 to 1848.
