= Sophie Lebrun =

German pianist and composer

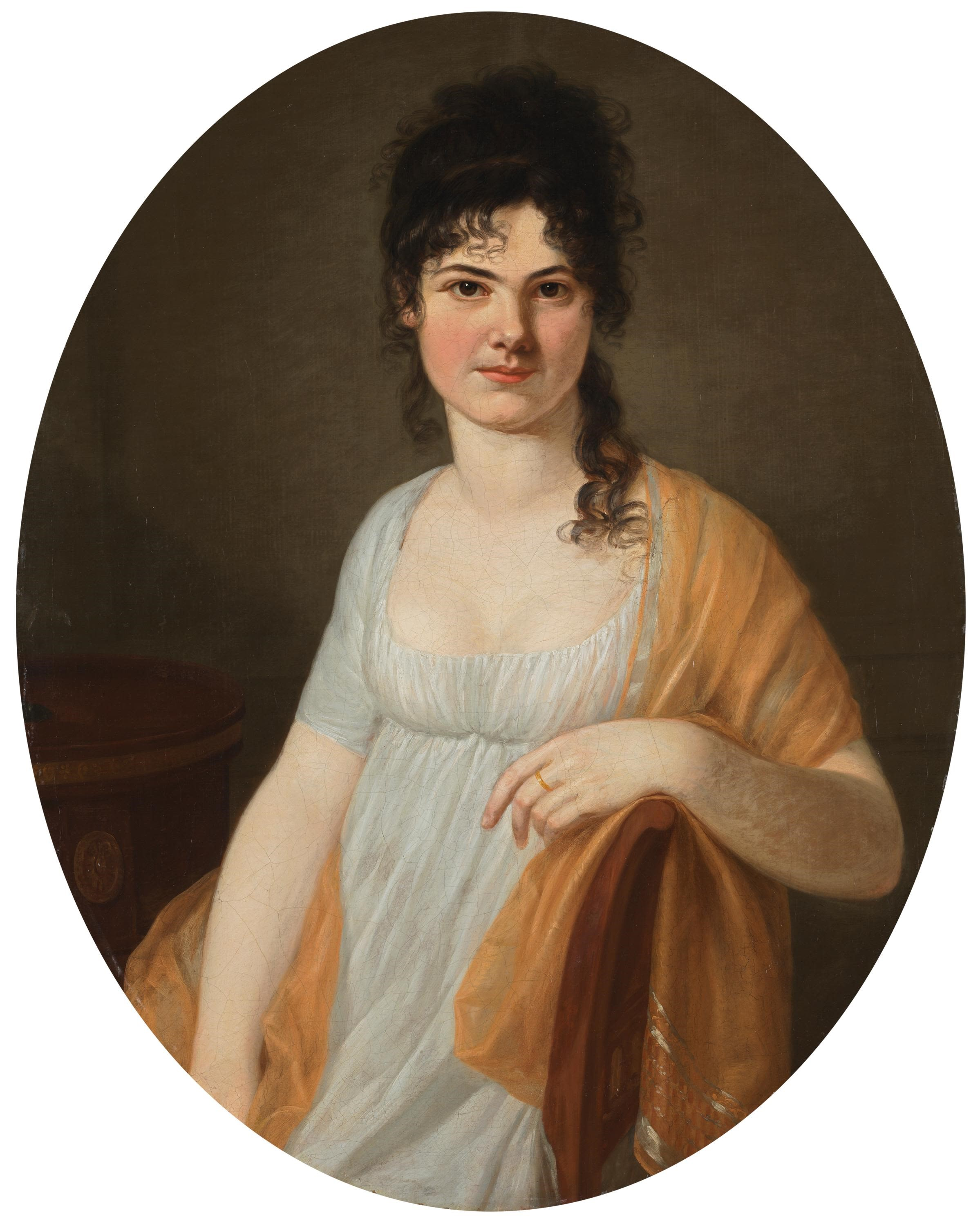
Sophie Dulcken, c. 1805

Sophie Lebrun Dülken (20 July 1781 – 23 July 1863) was a German pianist and composer, the daughter of Munich court oboist Ludwig August Lebrun and singer and composer Francesca Lebrun (Franziska Danzi). Sophie Lebrun was born in London while her mother was on tour. Both she and her sister, the singer and actress Rosine Lebrun, studied singing with their uncle, composer Franz Danzi, and piano with Andreas Streicher.

After completing her studies, Lebrun toured in Europe and became a well-known concert pianist. She married Munich court piano maker J.L. Dülken in 1799 and had children Theobald (b. 1800), who married Louise David the famous pianist, Louise (b. 1805), Fanny (b. 1807) and Violande (b. 1810), all of whom became musicians. Lebrun composed sonatas and other piano works which were unpublished and became lost. She died in Munich.
