= Ludwig August Lebrun =

German oboist and composer

Ludwig August Lebrun (baptized 2 May 1752 – 16 December 1790) was a German oboist and composer.

== Life ==
Lebrun was born in Mannheim. The well-known and celebrated oboe virtuoso (a contemporary described being "charmed by his divine oboe") played with the orchestra at the court of the Prince-Elector Carl Theodor in Mannheim. He started playing with the orchestra at the age of 12 and became a full member at the age of 15. His father, also an oboist probably from present-day Belgium, worked from 1747 at the Mannheim court. He was a contemporary of Carl Stamitz and Anton Stamitz, and belonged to the Mannheim school.

In the summer of 1778 he married the soprano Franziska Danzi, one of the most outstanding and well-known singers of the time and the sister of composer Franz Danzi. With her, he travelled extensively across Europe: Milan, Paris, London, Vienna, Prague, Naples, Munich and Berlin. The couple's playing and singing complemented each other perfectly and arias with obbligato oboe were written for them, as for instance those in Günther von Schwarzburg (1777) by Ignaz Holzbauer, L'Europa riconosciuta (1778) by Antonio Salieri and Castore e Polluce (1787) by Georg Joseph Vogler.

The music historian Charles Burney wrote about appearances of the pair: "Franziska Danzi and the excellent oboist Lebrun usually travel together, and it seems as though she has listened to nothing other than his instrument, for when they perform together in thirds and sixths one cannot hear which is the upper or the lower voice!"

He died in Berlin at the age of 38 from the effects of liver inflammation.

Lebrun was the father of opera singer and actress Rosine Lebrun and pianist and composer Sophie Lebrun.

== Works ==
- Ballet "Armida" and "Adèle de Ponthieu"
- Concertos for Oboe and Orchestra No.1 in D minor, No.2 in G minor, No.3 in C major, No.4 in B-flat major, No.5 in C major, No.6 in F major
- Concerto for Clarinet and Orchestra in B-flat major
- Duos for Violin and Viola
- Flute duets
- Flute trios
