= Ignaz Fränzl =

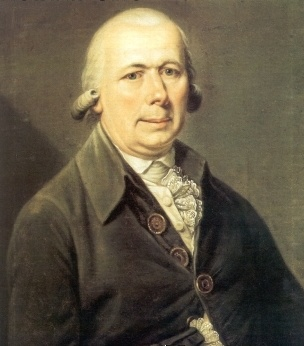
- Fränzl c. 1780
- Born: 3 June 1736; Mannheim
- Died: September 1811 (aged 75); Mannheim
- Era: Classical
- Children: 2, including Ferdinand
- Father: Ferdinand Rudolph Fränzl

Ignaz Fränzl (3 June 1736 – 6 September 1811 (buried)) was a German violinist, composer and representative of the second generation of the so-called Mannheim School. Mozart, who heard him at a concert in November 1777, wrote of him in a letter to his father: He may not be a sorcerer, but he is a very solid violinist indeed. Fränzl carried the Mannheim violin technique, established by Johann Stamitz, one step further to real virtuosity. Mozart, quite a good violinist himself and thoroughly acquainted with the instrument, praised Fränzl's double trill and said he had never heard a better one.

== Biography ==
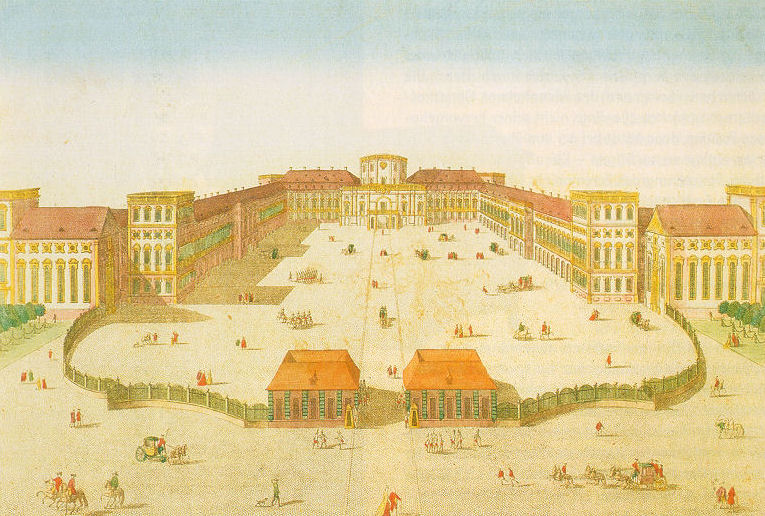
Mannheim Palace (1755)

The son of trumpeter and viola player Ferdinand Rudolph Fränzl, Ignaz Fränzl was born and died in Mannheim. He entered the Mannheim court orchestra in 1747 as a violinist, probably as a scholar (i.e. apprentice) similar to Christian Cannabich, another composer-violinist of the Mannheim school. In the personnel list of 1756 he is documented as a first violinist together with Cannabich and Carlo Giuseppe Toeschi. As was the case with many of his colleagues of the Mannheim court orchestra, Fränzl also travelled to Paris on a few occasions where he performed at the Concert Spirituel. In 1774 he was promoted to concertmaster, a position which he kept until most of the court orchestra was transferred to Munich in 1778.

He was also active as a violin teacher. His most notable pupils were his own son, Ferdinand Fränzl, Pierre Noël Gervais, Paul Anton Winnberger, and Friedrich Wilhelm Pixis (II), brother of the more famous piano virtuoso Johann Peter Pixis.

Contrary to the majority of the other members of the court orchestra, Fränzl did not relocate to Munich but chose to stay in Mannheim where he became music director of the court theatre, a position which he held until 1804.

== Fränzl as seen by Mozart ==
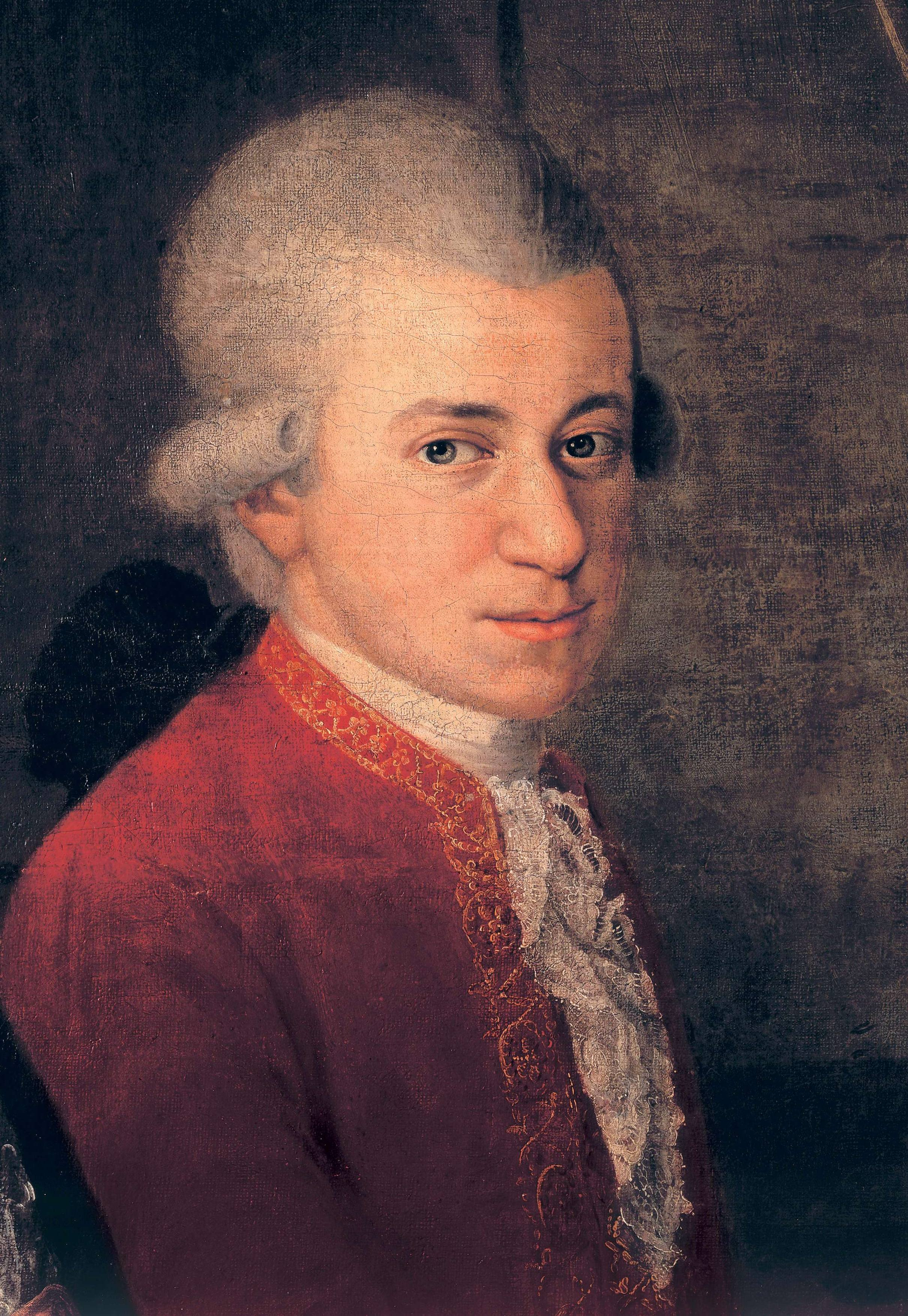
Mozart (1780–1781)

Mozart heard Fränzl play a violin concerto on 22 November 1777. The concert probably took place in the Rittersaal (Knight’s hall) of the Mannheim Palace. Mozart wrote home to his father on the same evening:

"To-day at six o'clock the gala concert took place. I had the pleasure of hearing Herr Fränzl (who married a sister of Madame Cannabich's) play a concerto on the violin; he pleased me very much. You know that I am no lover of mere difficulties. He plays difficult music, but it does not appear to be so; indeed, it seems as if one could easily do the same, and this is the real thing. He has a very fine round tone, not a note is missing, and everything is distinct and well accentuated. He has also a beautiful staccato in bowing, both up and down, and I never heard such a double trill as his. In short, though in my opinion no sorcerer, he is a very solid violin player indeed."

The Concerto for Violin and Piano, K. 315f, was written for him and Mozart to play, but was never completed due to Mozart's departure from Mannheim in December 1778.

== Selected works ==
Most of Fränzl's works were first published in Paris. The whole body of his work is rather small. It comprises about two dozen works, all of them instrumental.

=== Orchestral ===
- 2 Symphonies
- 6 Concertos for violin and orchestra

=== Chamber music ===
- 6 Sonatas for two violins and violoncello
- 6 String quartets
- 3 Quartets for flute and string trio (violin, viola, violoncello) which could also be played as string quartets.

== Sources ==
- Blume, Friedrich, Hrsg. Die Musik in Geschichte und Gegenwart. Allgemeine Enzyklopädie der Musik. Ungekürzte elektronische Ausgabe der ersten Auflage. Kassel: Bärenreiter, 1949–1987.
- Dittersdorf, Karl Ditters von. Autobiography – Dictated to his Son. London: Richard Bentley and Son, 1896 (First German edition 1801).
- Mozart, Wolfgang Amadeus. The Letters of Wolfgang Amadeus Mozart. Edited by Ludwig Nohl. Translated by Lady Wallace (i.e. Grace Jane Wallace). Vol. 1. 2 vols. New York: Hurd and Houghton, 1866.
- Riemann, Hugo. Handbuch der Musikgeschichte. Die Musik des 18. und 19. Jahrhhunderts. Zweite, von Alfred Einstein durchgesehene Auflage. Bd. II. V Bde. Leipzig: Breitkopf & Härtel, 1922.
- Slonimsky, Nicolas, ed. Baker's Biographical Dictionary of Musicians. 5th Completely Revised Edition. New York, 1958.
- Alfried Wieczorek, Hansjörg Probst, Wieland Koenig, Hrsg. Lebenslust und Frömmigkeit – Kurfürst Carl Theodor (1724–1799) zwischen Barock und Aufklärung. Bd. 2. 2 Bde. Regensburg, 1999. ISBN 3-7917-1678-6
