= Piano Concerto in B-flat major =

Piano Concerto in B-flat major may refer to:

- Piano Concerto No. 6 (Mozart)
- Piano Concerto No. 15 (Mozart)
- Piano Concerto No. 18 (Mozart)
- Piano Concerto No. 27 (Mozart)
- Piano Concerto No. 2 (Beethoven)
- Piano Concerto No. 2 (Brahms)
- Piano Concerto No. 4 (Prokofiev)
- Piano Concerto (Bliss)
