= Genia Kühmeier =

Austrian singer and opera singer

- Born: 1975 (age 49–50); Salzburg, Austria
- Education: Mozarteum; University of Music and Performing Arts Vienna
- Occupation: Operatic soprano
- Organizations: Vienna State Opera
- Website: www.geniakuehmeier.com

Genia Kühmeier (born 1975) is an Austrian operatic soprano who has appeared internationally in opera and concert. She made her debut at the Vienna State Opera as Pamina in Mozart's Die Zauberflöte in 2003, and sang the role also at the Salzburg Festival and the Metropolitan Opera.

== Career ==
Born in Salzburg, Kühmeier grew up in Grödig. She attended elementary school, an economics grammar school and an educational institution for kindergarten teachers in Salzburg. She dropped out of that school in 1993 in order to study singing teaching at the Mozarteum until 1997, when she moved to the University of Music and Performing Arts Vienna to study solo singing. She enhanced her studies by master classes with Ruthilde Boesch, Marjana Lipovšek and Margarita Lilowa, all Kammersängerin. In 2002 she won the 8th Internationaler Mozartwettbewerb Salzburg in Salzburg in the singing category. In 2003 Kühmeier became a member of the ensemble at the Vienna State Opera as a Karajan scholarship holder, and remained until 2006. In April 2003, she made her debut at the Vienna State Opera as Pamina in Mozart's Die Zauberflöte. She was awarded the Eberhard-Waechter-Medaille for her role as Inès in Donizetti's La favorite in 2003. She appeared at La Scala in Milan as Diane in Gluck's Iphigénie en Aulide, and returned in 2004 to perform in Salieri's Europa riconosciuta, conducted by Riccardo Muti.

At the 2005 and 2006 Salzburg Festivals, she was again Pamina, conducted by Muti. At the 2007 Styriarte, she sang Hanne in Haydn's Die Jahreszeiten. She performed the soprano solo in Ein deutsches Requiem by Brahms, conducted by Nikolaus Harnoncourt, with the Arnold Schoenberg Choir and the Vienna Philharmonic at the Musikverein.

In November 2007, Kühmeier made her U.S. debut as Pamina at the Metropolitan Opera in New York, conducted by Kirill Petrenko. In 2008, she appeared as Micaela in Bizet's Carmen in Los Angeles, and as Ilia in his Idomeneo in San Francisco, where a reviewer noted that "Austrian soprano Kühmeier as Ilia was sensitive and thoughtful. Her voice had a sparkly quality, with crystalline pianissimos. She also showed a wonderful emotional range."

== Recordings ==
Kühmeier recorded Die Zauberflöte with Muti, Haydn's Die Schöpfung with William Christie, also his Die Jahreszeiten and the Brahms Deutsches Requiem with Harnoncourt. She recorded lieder by Mozart, Schubert, Dvořák and Strauss. She recorded the solo in Mahler's Fourth Symphony live with the Münchner Philharmoniker, the orchestra that had played the premiere, conducted by Valery Gergiev. A critic noted: "Kühmeier's endearingly fresh and expressive singing of the child's innocent vision of heaven is admirable."
