= Piano Sonata No. 7 (Mozart) =

1777 composition by W. A. Mozart

Piano Sonata in C major
- No. 7
- by W. A. Mozart
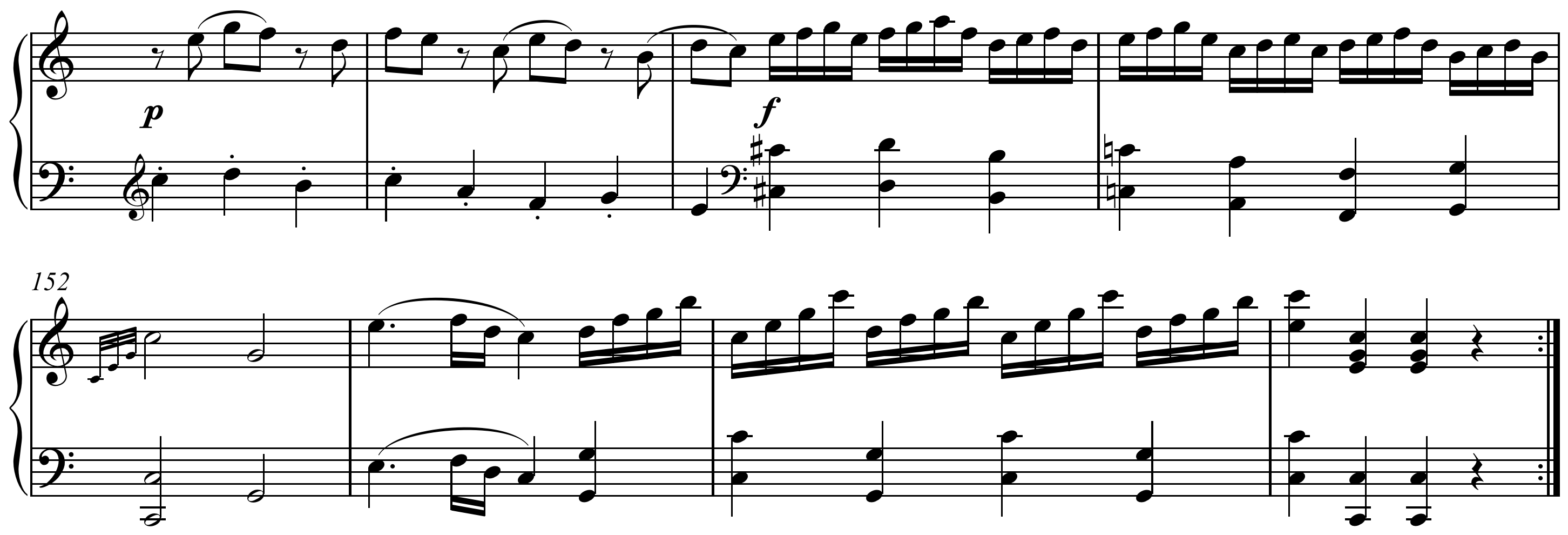
- Coda.
- Key: C major
- Catalogue: K. 309 (284b)
- Style: Classical period
- Composed: 1777
- Movements: Three (Allegro con spirito, Andante un poco adagio, Rondo – allegretto grazioso)

Wolfgang Amadeus Mozart's Piano Sonata No. 7 in C major, K. 309 (284b) (1777) is a piano sonata in three movements:

1. Allegro con spirito
2. Andante un poco adagio (F major)
3. Rondo (allegretto grazioso)

A typical performance takes about 16 minutes.

The work was composed during a journey to Mannheim and Paris in 1777–1778. In a letter to his father Leopold dated 24 October 1777, Mozart describes a concert where he played "a magnificent sonata in C major with a closing rondo, my own invention", suggesting that the sonata was completed by October 1777. The andante movement is a "portrait" of his pupil Rose Cannabich, the 13-year-old daughter of the Mannheim Kapellmeister Christian Cannabich. Upon reviewing a copy of the manuscript, Mozart's father wrote that it was "a strange composition. It has something in it of the 'rather artificial' Mannheim style, but so very little that your own good style is not spoilt."
