= Friedrich Wilhelm Pixis =

German violinist

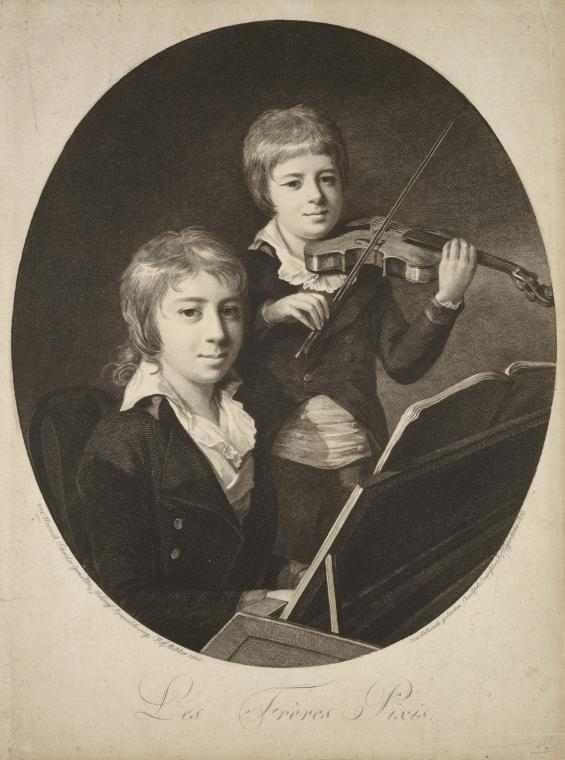
Violinist Friedrich Wilhelm Pixis, with his brother, pianist Johann Peter Pixis. c. 1800.

Friedrich Wilhelm Pixis (1786 – 20 October 1842) was a German violinist. He became professor of violin at Prague Conservatory and was important in the musical life of Prague.

== Life ==
Friedrich Wilhelm Pixis was born in Mannheim in 1786. His father, also Friedrich Wilhelm, was organist at the Evangelical Reformed Church in Mannheim, and composer of music for organ and for piano; his brother Johann Peter Pixis became a pianist and composer.

He showed musical talent at an early age. He studied under Ignaz Fränzl, and was a notable player by the age of nine. From 1797 until 1800, his father took him and his brother Johann Peter on tours playing in German cities. During his stay in Hamburg in 1798 he had lessons with Giovanni Battista Viotti. They later toured in Poland and Russia. Eventually the father settled in Vienna, where the two brothers had lessons with Johann Georg Albrechtsberger.

Friedrich Wilhelm moved in 1810 to Prague, and became professor of violin at Prague Conservatory. He later was leader of the theatre orchestra, and director of the Prague Musical Society. He had a high reputation as a teacher, and became important in the musical life of Prague, his activities including string quartet concerts.

He died in Prague on 20 October 1842.
