= Margaret Baker Genovesi =

Australian soprano (c. 1933–2022)

Margaret Baker Genovesi (c. 1933 – 23 February 2022) was an Australian soprano based in Rome.

== Early life ==
Born in Brisbane as Margaret Baker, her early musical promise as a child was recognised with performances broadcast on Australia's Amateur Hour. Later, she represented Queensland in the 1953 Melba Quest and won the Queensland ABC Concerto and Vocal competition in 1954.

== Career ==
Early in her career, while still in Australia, Baker Genovesi was a popular young soloist performing with the Queensland Symphony Orchestra, the Australian Broadcasting Corporation and the Queensland National Opera now Opera Queensland.

Baker Genovesi then moved to Europe to complete her studies and was supported by scholarships awarded by the Accademia Nazionale di Santa Cecilia, Rome, and the Accademia Musicale Chigiana in Siena. She was eventually based in Rome. Her operatic roles included: Violetta La traviata (including her Australian professional debut); Susanna in The Marriage of Figaro (including her European debut); Circe in The Enchantress Circe (recorded with Flavio Colusso); Miss Pinkerton in The Old Maid and the Thief (recorded with Jorge Mester); Valletto in L'incoronazione di Poppea (recorded with Nikolaus Harnoncourt); Fortuna, Guinone and Melanto in Il ritorno d'Ulisse in patria (also recorded with Nikolaus Harnoncourt) and First Witch/ Second Woman in L'incoronazione di Poppea (recorded with Charles Mackerras).

During her operatic career in Europe and on later retirement in Australia, Baker Genovesi was also a renowned musical educator, operatic vocal coach and adjudicator of international operatic singing competitions. Amongst her pupils is the Italian dramatic coloratura soprano Desirée Rancatore.

== Personal life ==
She was married to the Italian engineer Vittorio Genovesi. Baker Genovesi died aged 89 in Brisbane.

== Discography ==
- Anfossi: La maga Circe (The Enchantress Circe), Baker-Genovesi et al., Il Gruppo di Roma, Bongiovanni-Inedita conducted by Flavio Colusso GB 10001/2-2.
- Menotti: The Old Maid and the Thief, Judith Blegen, John Reardon, Anna Reynolds, Margaret Baker, Orchestra of the Teatro Verdi Di Trieste, conducted by Jorge Mester, Mercury Living Presence SR90521
- Monteverdi: L'incoronazione di Poppea, Margaret Baker-Genovesi, Cathy Berberian, Helen Donath et al, Concentus Musicus, Wein, conducted by Nikolaus Harnoncourt, Deutsche Grammophon, 1995.
- Monteverdi: Il ritorno d'Ulisse in patria, with Lasdislaus Anderko, Giacomo Badoaro, Margaret Baker-Genovesi, Murray Dickie et al. Concentus Musicus, Wein, conducted by Nikolaus Harnoncourt, Teledec 1971.
- Purcell: Dido and Aeneas with Tatiana Troyanos, Barry McDaniel, Sheila Armstrong, Patricia Johnson, Margaret Baker-Genovesi, Monteverdi Choir (Hamburg), Norddeutscher Rundfunk (Hamburg) Kammerorchester, conducted by Charles Mackerras. Hamburg : Archiv Produktion, 1967.
- Tchaikovsky: Eugene Onegin, Geoffrey Chard, Joan Carden, Keith Lewis, Suzanne Johnston, Margaret Baker-Genovesi, Noel Mangin, Bev Shean, Richard Divall conducting (1983 Victoria State Opera production)
- Louis Spohr, 6 Lieder, Op. 103, Margaret Baker, Rainer Schumacher, Hermann Reutter (2019).
