= Ferdinand Fränzl =

German violinist and conductor (1767–1833)

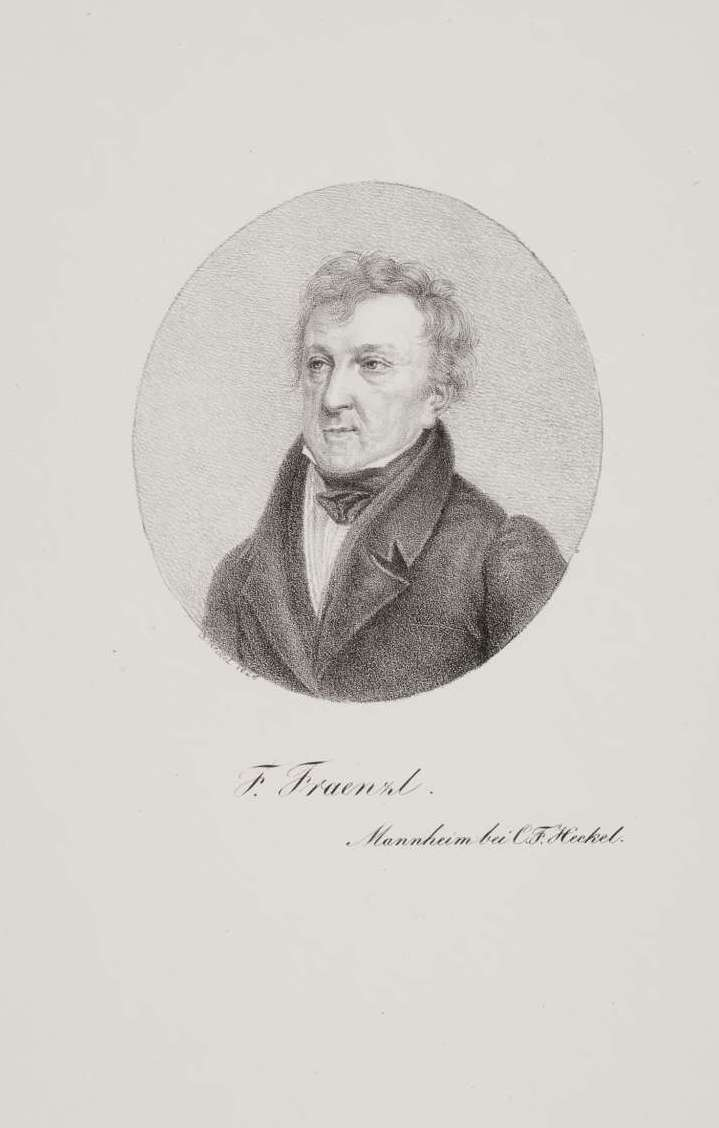
Portrait Ferdinand Fraenzl (Ignaz Joseph)

Ferdinand Fränzl (24 May 1767 in Schwetzingen – 27 October 1833 in Mannheim) was a German violinist, composer, conductor, opera director, and a representative of the third generation of the so-called Mannheim school.

The quality of his violin playing must have been comparable to his father’s who in turn was one of the best violinists of his generation. The violinist and composer Louis Spohr, however, who heard him at least twice already in 1810 judged Fränzl’s playing as old-fashioned, reminiscent of a bygone era; he also criticised Fränzel’s impure tone.

== Biography ==
Fränzl was the grandson of trumpeter and viola player Ferdinand Rudolph Fränzl. His first teacher was his father Ignaz Fränzl, a competent composer himself and one of the foremost violinists of his day. Ferdinand entered the Mannheim court orchestra in 1782. Already in 1785 he went on his first concert tour.

Although already an accomplished virtuoso, Fränzl (probably supervised by his father) rounded off his education in Strasbourg. Here he received lessons in composition and counterpoint form Franz Xaver Richter and Ignaz Pleyel. The two, as disparate as they were, made a good pair of teachers for the young Fränzl. Richter, probably already a teacher of Ferdinand Fränzl’s father, was a conservative contrapuntist of the old school widely respected for his sacred music. Pleyel was a Haydn pupil and already a successful, renowned and modern composer of chamber music and symphonies. Fränzel finally added some international touch to his musical education in Paris (1787) and Bologna (1788).

In 1789 he was named concertmaster of the Munich court orchestra, successor to the Mannheim court orchestra. After only two years in Munich he relocated to Frankfurt am Main (1792) where he assumed the post of concertmaster at the Frankfurt national theatre. During the same time he undertook extended concert tours to England and Russia. In 1806 he succeeded Carl Cannabich as director of the instrumental music of the Munich court orchestra.

== 1802 Fränzl as seen by Louis Spohr ==
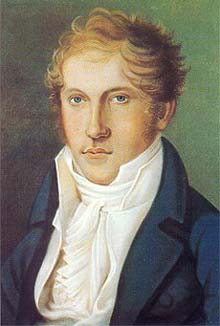
Louis Spohr (ca. 1805)

The German violinist and composer Louis Spohr, certainly a competent judge in music matters, met Ferdinand Fränzl during a concert tour to Russia. Spohr attended a concert by Fränzl in May 1802. Despite some feeble attempts at polite praise, Spohr’s impression of Fränzl was predominantly negative:

"The best violinist then in St. Petersburg was, without doubt, Fränzl junior. He had just come from Moscow where he had been engaged for six concerts at three thousand roubles. His attitude in playing displeased me. The diary says: "He holds the violin still in the old manner, on the right side of the tail piece, and must therefore play with his head bent ... To this must be added that, he raised the right arm very high, and has the bad habit of elevating his eyebrows at the expressive passages. If this is not unpleasant to the majority of the listeners it is still very disagreeable for a violinist to see. His playing is pure and clean. In the Adagio parts, he executes many runs, shakes, and other ornaments, with a rare clearness and delicacy. As soon however as he played loud, his tone was rough and unpleasant, because he draws his bow too slowly and too near to the bridge, and leans it too much to one side. He executed the passages clearly and purely, but always with the middle of the bow, and consequently without distinction of piano and forte."

This is one of the accounts of the violin playing of a representative of the Mannheim school. Spohr was the pupil of a Mannheim violinist. Moreover, Spohr, became a leading German violinist of his generation and of one generation later than Ferdinand Fränzl, he was a judge when it came to appraising violin playing.

== Sources ==
- Blume, Friedrich, Hrsg. Die Musik in Geschichte und Gegenwart. Allgemeine Enzyklopädie der Musik. Ungekürzte elektronische Ausgabe der ersten Auflage. Kassel: Bärenreiter, 1949-1987.
- Riemann, Hugo. Handbuch der Musikgeschichte. Die Musik des 18. und 19. Jahrhhunderts. Zweite, von Alfred Einstein durchgesehene Auflage. Bd. II. V Bde. Leipzig: Breitkopf & Härtel, 1922.
- Slonimsky, Nicolas, ed. Baker's Biographical Dictionary of Musicians. 5th Completely Revised Edition. New York, 1958.
- Spohr, Louis. Louis Spohr's Autobiography. London: Longman, Green etc., 1865
- Alfried Wieczorek, Hansjörg Probst, Wieland Koenig, Hrsg. Lebenslust und Frömmigkeit. Kurfürst Carl Theodor (1724–1799) zwischen Barock und Aufklärung. Bd. 2. 2 Bde. Regensburg, 1999. ISBN 3-7917-1678-6
