= Giuseppe Sabbatini =

Italian opera singer

Giuseppe Sabbatini (born 11 May 1957 in Rome, Italy) is a lyric tenor, conductor, and double-bassist.

== Career ==
Sabbatini's opera repertoire includes Idomeneo, Mitridate, re di Ponto, Don Giovanni, Linda di Chamounix, La favorita, L'elisir d'amore, Anna Bolena, Maria Stuarda, Roberto Devereux, Lucrezia Borgia, Dom Sébastien, I puritani, Rigoletto, La Traviata, Falstaff, La Bohème, Eugene Onegin, Auber's Fra Diavolo, Werther, Manon, Thaïs, La Damnation de Faust, Benvenuto Cellini, Les Contes d'Hoffmann, Orphée aux Enfers, Les Pêcheurs de Perles and Gounod's Faust. He has sung in the leading opera houses of the world, such as La Scala (his usual base), the Vienna Staatsoper, the Royal Opera House, Covent Garden and others. Sabbatini made his debut in the USA in February 2001, at the New York Metropolitan Opera, singing the leading tenor role in Massenet's Manon.

Films for TV were made with Giuseppe Sabbatini in the operas Robert Devereux (1997), La Traviata (2001), La Damnation de Faust (1999), and Europa riconosciuta (2004). A recording is commercially available of a TV presentation of a 1993 Tokyo Boheme with Daniela Dessì as Mimi.

Giuseppe Sabbatini has won several national and international voice competitions, such as the Jussi Björling Prize in 1987, the Caruso Prize and the Lauri Volpi Prize in 1990, the 1991 Abbiati Prize for Vocal Interpretation, and the 1996 Tito Schipa Prize.

On 25 April 2003 Sabbatini received the title of Kammersänger by the Vienna Staatsoper.

Sabbatini can also conduct as well as play the double bass. At a concert in Japan in 2006, he played the double bass on "the elephant" from the Carnival of the Animals by Saint-Saëns, with the accompaniment of conductor Nicola Luisotti on piano. On the next song "Non piu andrai", Sabbatini took conducting duties, while Luisotti sang lead vocal, with the lyrics of the last line changed from "Cherubino alla vittoria" to "Sabbatini alla vittoria".
