= Horn Sonata No. 2 (Danzi) =

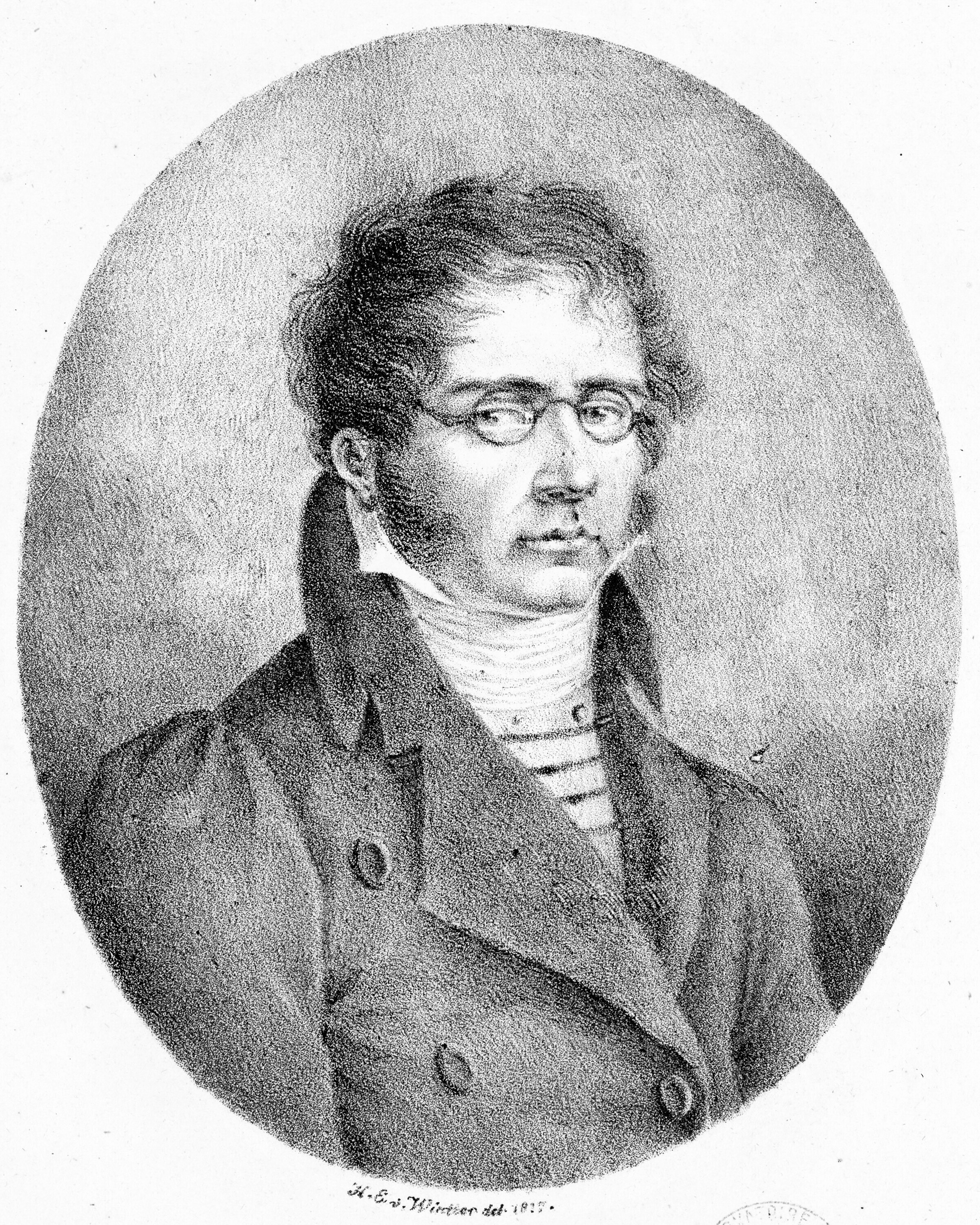
An 1817 engraving of Franz Danzi

The Horn Sonata No. 2 in E minor, Op. 44 (Also known as the Sonata Concertante, Op. 44.) is a composition by Franz Danzi published by Breitkopf & Härtel in 1814, after being advertised by the publisher in late 1813.

Like the earlier horn sonata, the precise details of this composition's creation are not known, though it may have been the response to the publication in 1812 of a horn sonata by virtuoso pianist Nikolaus von Krufft.

== Music ==
As with the Horn Sonata, Op. 28, the work was first published scored for piano and natural horn with the possibility of a cello being substituted for the horn in performance. In more recent years the valve horn has been substituted for the natural horn in performance. As in the earlier work the piano is the dominant instrument, with the horn in an essentially accompanying role, albeit with opportunities to share in the melodic material.

The composition is in three movements:

1. Allegro
2. Larghetto
3. Allegretto

A typical performance takes around 22 minutes.
