= Piano Concerto No. 6 (Mozart) =

Piano Concerto in three movements by W. A. Mozart

- by W. A. Mozart
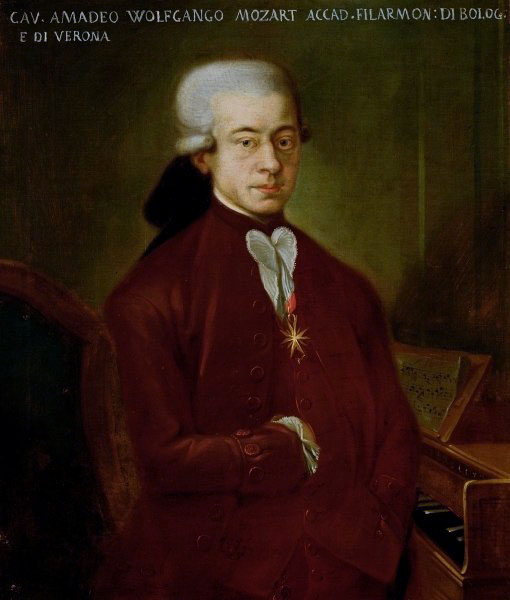
- 1777 Bologna portrait of Mozart, showing him with the Order of the Golden Spur
- Key: B♭ major
- Catalogue: K. 238
- Composed: 1776
- Published: 1793
- Movements: 3
- Scoring: Piano; orchestra

I. Allegro aperto

II. Andante un poco adagio

III. Rondeau: Allegro

The Piano Concerto No. 6 in B♭ major, K. 238, was composed by Wolfgang Amadeus Mozart in January 1776. His Concerto No. 7 (K. 242) for three pianos and his Concerto No. 8 (K. 246) in C major would follow within three months. The three works share what Cuthbert Girdlestone refers to as a galant style.

The United States Library of Congress holds the autograph score. Mozart had intended to publish the score after he composed it, but it did not appear in print until after his death, in 1793. He did, however, perform the work, in Munich in 1777, and in Augsburg on 22 October 1777. His student Rose Cannabich performed the work in Mannheim on 13 February 1778. Angela Hewitt observes that the first performances of the work were probably on a harpsichord rather than a fortepiano.

== Music ==
The work is scored for two flutes, two oboes, two French horns, solo piano, and strings. It is a lightly textured work from early in Mozart's career.

The work is structured in three movements:

1. Allegro aperto
2. Andante un poco adagio
3. Rondeau: Allegro

=== I. Allegro aperto ===
The first movement, in sonata form, is marked Allegro aperto. "Aperto" literally means "open", an attribute often used in Mozart's early concertos, and while the exact meaning Mozart intended is unknown, it conveys "radiance and gaiety", as the pianist Angela Hewitt notes. The development offers an episode of minor mode arpeggios and broken octaves in the piano, contrasted by "plaintive intervals" of the oboe. It is in the development, and only there, that Girdlestone considers that the movement "gives us a glimpse of the true Mozart", as the recapitulation reprises the "well-bred, aristocratic good temper" of the movement's opening. Mozart provided a short cadenza.

=== II. Andante un poco adagio ===
In the second movement, in E♭ major, two flutes replace the oboes of the first movement. The music is simple and gentle. Hewitt traces elements of the Andante in the Concerto in C major, K. 467: "the use of a triplet accompaniment, muted strings, and a pizzicato bass". She notes a "marvellous effect of chiaroscuro" by switching between major and minor keys, a technique adopted in many of his later works.

=== III. Rondeau: Allegro ===
In the final Rondeau, the oboes return instead of the flutes, but the horns receive prominence. Hewitt recalls, that Mozart asked his sister once to remind him "to give the horns something worthwhile to do". They contribute to the dance-like character of the movement. A section in G minor is called "the one really virtuoso page of the concerto, requiring some very nimble Baroque-style fingerwork". Mozart wrote another short cadenza, with rests that still should be improvised by the soloist.
