= Desirée Rancatore =

Italian opera singer

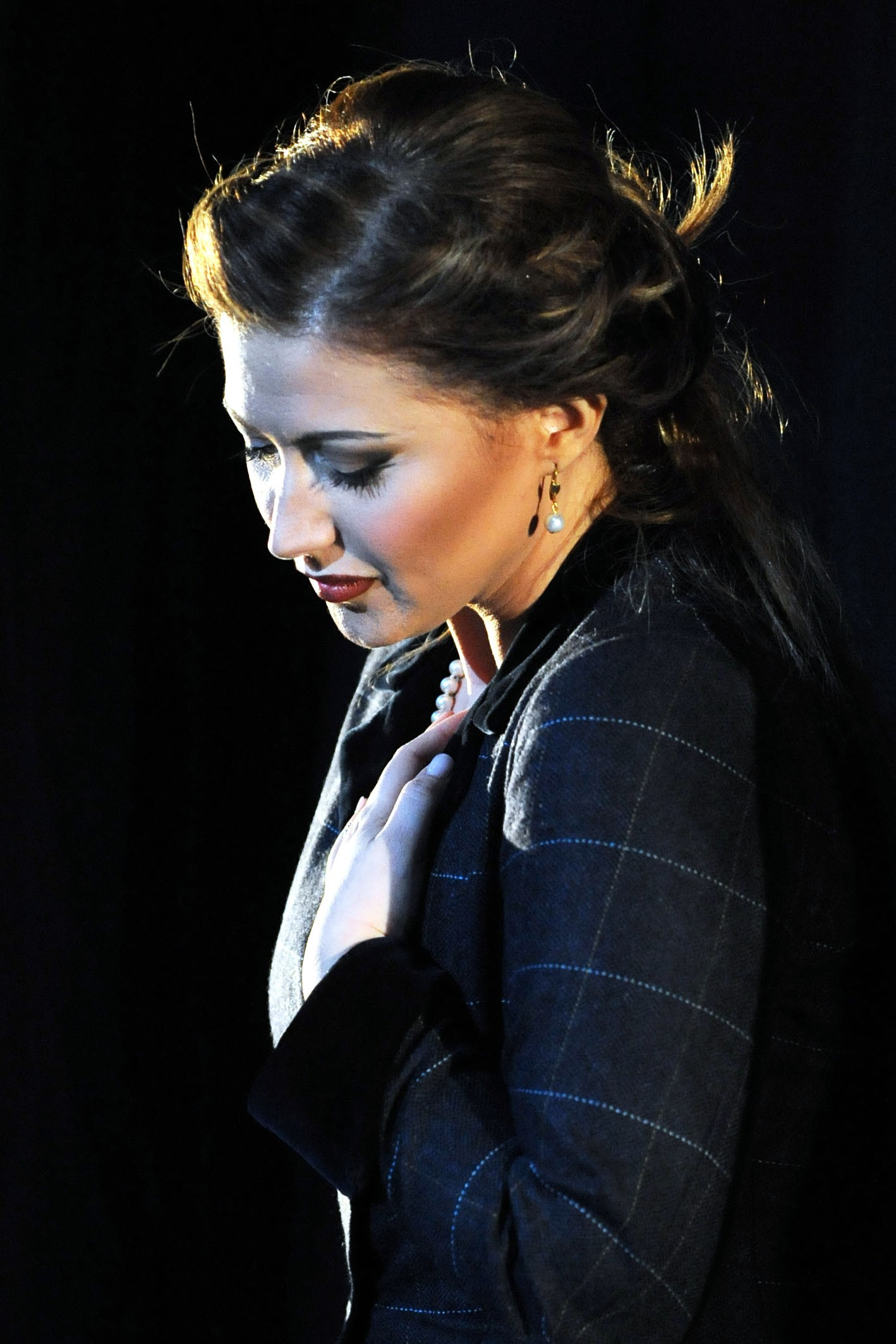
- Rancatore as Lucia in Lucia di Lammermoor in Palermo, 2009
- Born: 29 January 1977 (age 49); Palermo, Sicily, Italy
- Occupation: Opera singer (soprano)
- Years active: 1996–present
- Website: www.desireerancatore.net

Desirée Rancatore (born 29 January 1977) is an Italian dramatic coloratura soprano with an active career on the opera and concert stages of Europe.

== Biography ==
Rancatore was born in Palermo. She studied violin and piano before studying singing with her mother Maria Argento at the age of 16 and later in Rome, with Margaret Baker Genovesi. She won first prizes at several competitions: Ibla International Competition in Ragusa (1995), V. Bellini International Competition in Caltanissetta (1995), Maria Caniglia International Competition in Sulmona (1996). In 1996, at the age of 19 she debuted at the Salzburg Festival as Barbarina in Mozart's The Marriage of Figaro. She returned to the Festival in the following seasons for Die Entführung aus dem Serail (Blonde; 1997, 1998), Verdi's Don Carlo conducted by Lorin Maazel (Voice from Heaven; 1998, 1999), Great Mass in C minor (2000), Honegger's Jeanne d'Arc au bûcher (2001), Hasse's Piramo e Tisbe (2010; conducted by Fabio Biondi), and concerts at the Salzburg Mozarteum concert hall.

She debuted in Italy in 1997 at the opening of the season at the Teatro Regio in Parma in L'arlesiana by Francesco Cilea. In 1998, she sang her first Olympia in The Tales of Hoffmann, a role to which she would be associated, at the Teatro Massimo Bellini in Catania, and debuted at the Teatro Massimo in Palermo as Sophie in Der Rosenkavalier. She would perform the role of Olympia at the Royal Opera House in London, at the Zürich Opera, at the Massimo in Palermo, at the Opera in Rome, the Teatro Regio in Turin and Parma, the Toulouse Théâtre du Capitole, the Teatro Real in Madrid, La Scala in Milan, the Sferisterio di Macerata, the Chorégies d'Orange. In 1998/99 she made her Paris Opera debut in small roles. She then returned in four consecutive seasons for The Tales of Hoffmann, The Magic Flute, L'enfant et les sortilèges, alternating roles of Olympia and Queen of the Night with Natalie Dessay. In 1999, she made her Royal Opera, London debut in the role of Nannetta, premiering Graham Vick's new production of Falstaff, which opened the first season after the house's refurbishment. In the same year, she sang the role of Gilda in Rigoletto for the first time in a concert performance in Melbourne. Gilda became her signature role that brought her to San Francisco, Las Palmas, Tokyo, Venice, Mexico, Vienna, Verona, Parma, Beijing, Florence, Zurich and London (concert version at the Barbican).

In 2001, she made her Vienna State Opera debut with Olympia, returning in 2003 in the same role.

In April 2003, she debuted in the lead role in Delibes' Lakmé in Palermo, and then repeated the role at the Teatro Campoamor in Oviedo and the Tokyo Bunka Kaikan. In December 2004, at the reopening of La Scala in Milan, she sang the role of Semele in Salieri's Europa riconosciuta, conducted by Riccardo Muti.

Rancatore debuted in the lead role in Lucia di Lammermoor in the Teatro Donizetti in Bergamo in the 2005/06 season, later doing a tour of Japan in this role, conducted by Antonino Fogliani. She sang the role again in the Oviedo Opera, in the Zurich Opera, the Teatro Comunale di Bologna, the Teatro Francesco Cilea in Reggio Calabria and in the Teatro Comunale in Ferrara. She was invited to open the 2005/06 season at the Bologna Comunale in a new production of Ascanio in Alba, and in September 2008, she made her debut as Elvira in Bellini's I puritani in Palermo. Another of her roles is Adina from L'elisir d'amore, which she debuted in Laurent Pelly's production at the Opéra Bastille in Paris and which she performed again in the Teatro Lirico di Cagliari and in La Fenice in Venice. In 2010 she debuted the role of Amina from La sonnambula in Las Palmas.

In concert she has also performed as a soloist in Rossini's Petite messe solennelle in Paris, Mozart's Requiem (Massimo, Palermo), and Pergolesi's Stabat Mater (Paris, Radio France National Orchestra, conducted by Muti). She also participated in the opening concert of the 2003/04 season at La Scala and has sung with the Turin RAI Symphonic Orchestra and, in a gala alongside Bryn Terfel and the Royal Philharmonic Orchestra, London, as well as a Spanish tour with the Catania Massimo Bellini Philharmonic.

In 2011 she sang at the New Year's Concert at La Fenice, at the Liverpool Philharmonic Hall, at the Zürich Opera House (Rigoletto), at the Teatro Massimo Palermo (Lucia di Lammermoor), at the Greek Theatre of Syracuse (with Andrea Bocelli), at the Sferisterio Opera Festival (Rigoletto) and at the National Center for Performing Arts Beijing (Rigoletto).

2013 saw Rancatore's return to the Salzburg Festival in a one-off TV-live/online production of Die Entführung aus dem Serail, staged (alongside vintage aircraft) in Hangar-7 of Salzburg Airport while conducted, without visual contact, in Hangar-8 by Hans Graf. The same year, Vienna State Opera billed her as Violetta in La traviata. In 2016 Rancatore sang Violetta the Royal Danish Theatre.

== Personal life ==
Rancatore married young and the marriage ended in failure. On 8 July 2019, she married clarinetist Alessandro Cirrito at the Church of Saint Francis of Paola in Palermo.

== Discography ==
=== Operas ===
==== Video ====
- Verdi: Falstaff (1999; Nannetta). Royal Opera House, Opus Arte
- Mozart: Die Zauberflöte (2001; Queen of the Night). Paris Opera, TDK
- Strauss: Der Rosenkavalier (2004; Sophie). Teatro Massimo Palermo, Brilliant Classics
- Offenbach: Les contes d'Hoffmann (2004; Olympia). Paris Opera, TDK
- Offenbach: Les contes d'Hoffmann (2005; Olympia). Macerata Opera, Dynamic
- Donizetti: Lucia di Lammermoor (2007; Lucia). Teatro Donizetti Bergamo, Dynamic
- Mozart: Ascanio in Alba (2008; Fauno). Teatro Comunale Bologna, Bongiovanni
- Rossini: La cambiale di matrimonio (2008; Fanny), Rossini Opera Festival, Naxos Records
- Walter Braunfels: Die Vögel (2009; Nightingale), Los Angeles Opera, Arthaus Musik
- Salieri: Europa riconosciuta (2017; Semele), La Scala, Erato Records
- Mozart in Turkey (2003). documentary, BBC (containing footage of Die Entführung aus dem Serail)

==== Audio ====
- Mozart: Die Entführung aus dem Serail (2000; Blonde). Charles Mackerras, Scottish Chamber Orchestra & Chorus, Telarc
- Meyerbeer: Les Huguenots (2001; Marguerite de Valois). Renato Palumbo, Bratislava Chamber Choir, Orchestra Internazionale d'Italia, Dynamic
- Rossini: La cambiale di matrimonio (2002). Umberto Benedetti Michelangeli, Orchestra Haydn di Bolzano e Trento, Dynamic
- Donizetti: Lucia di Lammermoor (2010). Antonino Fogliani, Bergamo Musica Festival Orchestra, Naxos

=== Recitals & others ===
- 2011: New Years Concert La Fenice. DVD, Hardy
- 2017: Verdiana I. CD, Da Vinci Classics
- 2018: Paolo Tosti: The Song of a Life, Vol. 2. CD, Brilliant Classics

== Honours and awards ==
- 2004: Medaglia d'Oro Città di Milano Award
- 2008: Mimosa d'Oro Award
- 2008: Kaleidos Award
- 2008: Ester Mazzoleni Prize
- 2009: Zenatello Award
- 2010: Oscar della lirica, Verona
