= Europa riconosciuta =

1778 opera by Antonio Salieri

- Opera by Antonio Salieri
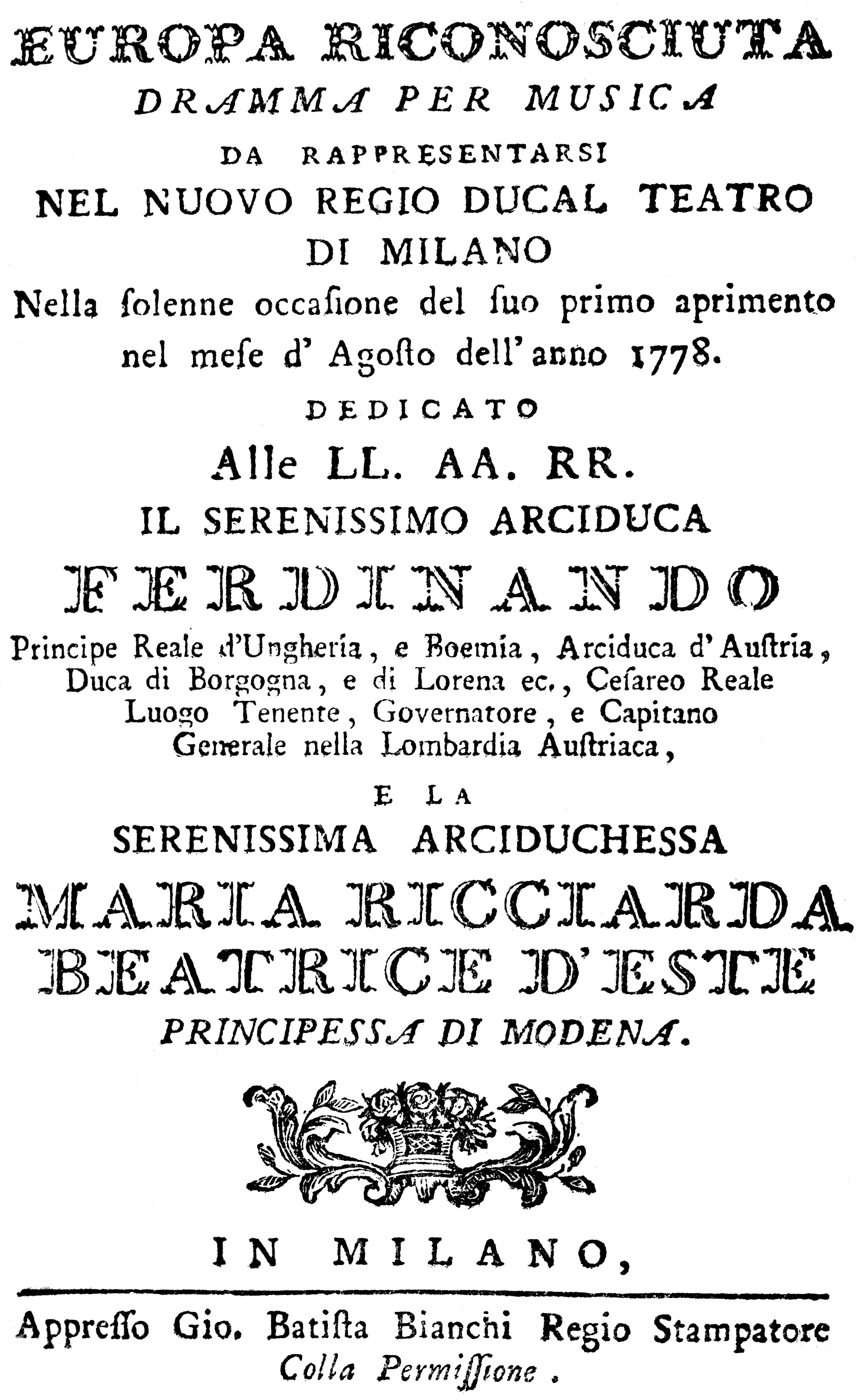
- Poster for the premiere at the inauguration of La Scala
- Librettist: Mattia Verazi
- Language: Italian
- Premiere: 3 August 1778; La Scala, Milan

Europa riconosciuta (Italian: [euˈrɔːpa rikonoʃˈʃuːta]; meaning "Europa revealed" or "Europa recognized") is an opera in two acts by Antonio Salieri, set to an Italian libretto by Mattia Verazi.

The opera takes place in the city of Tyre in Phoenicia, and tells a story of love, violence, and political discord in ancient times. The central character, Europa, was once the lover of Zeus and helps resolve all disagreements after she discloses her identity – thus the title "Europa Revealed". Though classed as a traditional opera seria, the work differentiates itself from several of the typical characteristics of the genre. For example: a murder is seen onstage and an extended finale is used in both acts, a practice more typical of opera buffa. Musically, the opera is quite challenging, requiring four principal singers capable of spanning wide tessituras, sustaining long phrases, and making dextrous leaps. For example, the roles of Europa and Semele go up to a high F sharp above high C a few times.

== Performance history ==
The opera was first performed for the inauguration of La Scala on 3 August 1778. The opera was not performed again until 7 December 2004 for the re-opening of La Scala, after the theater had been closed for almost three years for major renovations. Since the work had not been performed for so long, La Scala had to re-print the score for Europa riconosciuta from scratch, working from the original manuscripts in its library. The premiere of the new Europa riconosciuta was broadcast live on a closed-circuit telecast and in 2017 became available on DVD.

== Roles ==
Cast	Voice Type	Premiere, 3 August 1778 (Conductor: probably Salieri conducting at the harpsichord)	Revived version 7 December 2004 (Conductor: Riccardo Muti)
Europa	soprano	Maria Balducci	Diana Damrau
Asterio	soprano	Gaspare Pacchiarotti (castrato)	Genia Kühmeier
Semele	soprano	Francesca Danzi	Desirée Rancatore
Isséo	soprano	Giovanni Rubinelli (castrato)	Daniela Barcellona
Egisto	tenor	Antonio Prati	Giuseppe Sabbatini

== Synopsis ==
Princess Europa of Tyre and Prince Isséo are engaged to be married. Their plans to wed are ruined when the king of Crete, Asterio, abducts Europa from her father’s palace and forces her to marry him. Europa's father King Agenore of Tyre, tries to find his daughter but fails. In despair, he leaves his throne to his niece Semele instead of Europa on the condition that Semele must marry the man who kills the first foreigner to enter the nation of Tyre. In this way Europa’s kidnapping will be avenged. After Agenore’s death, Asterio sails from Crete towards Tyre in the hopes of placing Europa on the Tyrian throne.

=== Act I ===
==== Scene 1: A shore on the coast of Tyre ====
A major storm devastates Asterio’s fleet and causes his own ship to shipwreck off the coast of Tyre. Asterio, his wife Europa, and their son step off their boat onto the shore and are startled by the appearance of Egisto and his band of armed soldiers. Asterio manages to hide Europa in a cave, but is unable to save himself, his men, and his son from capture. Upon seeing this, Europa emerges from her hiding-place and tries to defend her son. Her efforts fail and she is taken with the rest of the Cretan prisoners to the palace of Tyre by Egisto and his men.

==== Scene 2: Semele's royal pavilion ====
Isséo has recently returned from a successful attack against the Cypriot rebels. Semele is in love with Isséo and has decided to marry him. She asks Egisto to assemble the grand council so that she can announce the name of the man she has chosen to marry, who will become the next king of Tyre. Meanwhile, Egisto, is determined to grasp the throne for himself and decides to openly challenge his rival.

==== Scene 3: Triumphal scene ====
Isséo and his soldiers enter the throne room celebrating their victory. Semele informs Isséo of her desire to share the Tyrian throne with him, and then asks him to attend the grand council with her. Isséo refuses Semele's request because he is still in love with Europa, and therefore is not free to love Semele.

==== Scene 4: A council chamber in Semele's palace ====
The council members pray for Temide's aid. Semele proclaims that she is prepared to choose the new king. Egisto foils her plan by reminding Semele of her promise to Agenore to marry the man that kills the first foreigner to set foot on Tyrian soil. Egisto produces Asterio in chains and hopes that he can execute Asterio in order that he might marry Semele and become king. Asterio, however, does not cooperate when questioned about his identity and origins. Frustrated, the council decides to interrogate Europa. She astounds everyone by proclaiming herself to be the missing princess of Tyre and rightful heir to the throne. Egisto is furious that his plan to obtain the throne is thwarted, while Isséo is greatly disturbed by Europa's reappearance. Seeing Isséo's response to Europa causes Semele to become full of jealous anger.

=== Act II ===
==== Scene 1: A prison ====
Asterio is in prison and is anxiously awaiting the council's decision on his fate. Concurrently, Egisto tries to convince Isséo that Europa may still love him. Europa enters and makes a plea for her family's lives. She does not express her feelings for Isséo but rather tells him that her loyalties are to her family as a wife and mother. Europa offers to relinquish the throne of Tyre to Semele, in exchange for the lives of her husband and son. She further begs Isséo to no longer remember the love they once had – as she herself has already forgotten – and to become king by marrying Semele. Isséo leaves Europa and she falls to the ground in tears.

==== Scene 2: A private room in the palace ====
Semele is highly jealous of Europa. She informs Isséo that the council has decided to execute the king of Crete and imprison his wife. In response, Isséo tells Semele that Europa no longer claims the throne. Furthermore, Isséo reveals Egisto’s treachery and informs Semele that he will marry her. Semele agrees to stop Asterio’s execution and sends Isséo to disband the proceedings.

==== Scene 3: The Temple of Vengeance ====
Asterio is about to be executed at the tomb of Agenore. Egisto offers Europa and her son their freedom if they are willing to flee. Europa rejects his offer, proclaiming that she prefers to die with her husband. Asterio begs them to accept Egisto's offer in order that they might live. The priests of Nemesi lead Asterio to the place of sacrifice, but they are interrupted by the emergence of Cretan soldiers. These soldiers are Asterio's men who got lost in the great storm but managed to survive. They have come, unexpectedly, to save Asterio's life. A tumultuous combat ensues between the Cretans and Egisto’s guards. Isséo appears with some of his men and joins the Cretan soldiers in fighting Egisto and his guards.

==== Scene 4: A courtyard ====
The Tyrian soldiers have been defeated but Egisto still fights on. Isséo and Egisto clash in a desperate fight and Egisto is killed. To the relief of Semele, Isséo is not wounded. Meanwhile, Europa is proclaimed the rightful heir to the throne by the people of Tyre. Semele is very upset until Isséo assures her that Europa will keep her promise.

==== Scene 5: A ceremonial chamber in the palace ====
Europa is proclaimed the new queen of Tyre, but her one and only act as queen is to marry Isséo and Semele and turn the throne over to them. Isséo and Semele happily accept. Synopsis based on Rodney Stringer's translation.

== Recordings ==
- 2004 performance – Diana Damrau, Desiree Rancatore, Genia Kühmeier, Daniela Barcellona, Giuseppe Sabbatini, La Scala Orchestra, Riccardo Muti Erato, DVD 2017
