= Ferdinand Rudolph Fränzl =

German musician

Ferdinand Rudolph Fränzl (August 12, 1710, Innsbruck – September 5, 1782, Mannheim) was a German trumpeter and viola player. He was a musician in service to Charles III Philip, Elector Palatine, and was for many years lead trumpeter in the orchestra of Palatinate. The patriarch of the Fränzl family of musicians, his son was the violinist and composer Ignaz Fränzl and his grandson was the violinist and composer Ferdinand Fränzl.
