= Rose Cannabich =

German classical pianist

- Born: Rosina Theresia Petronella Cannabich; 1764; Mannheim
- Died: 1839 (aged 74–75)
- Occupation: Classical pianist

Rosina ('Rosa') Cannabich (1764–1839) was a German classical pianist. Mozart dedicated a piano sonata to her when he was her teacher in Mannheim, where her father led the well-known orchestra.

== History ==
Rosina Theresia Petronella Cannabich was born in Mannheim, the daughter of the violinist and composer Christian Cannabich and his wife Maria Elisabeth née de la Motte, a lady of the bed chamber to the Duchess of Zweibrücken. She was baptized on 18 March or in April. Her father was the principal violinist (Konzertmeister) in the Mannheim court orchestra. He was instrumental in the Mannheim School, training the orchestra to its noted carefully graduated crescendos and diminuendos.

Rose was the oldest of six children. As was customary among musical families, the children received musical training, probably by their father and other members of the orchestra, such as the singers Augusta Elisabeth Wendling and Elisabeth Augusta Wendling and her husband, the violinist Franz Anton Wendling. Several of Rose's siblings also embarked on a musical career: Carl August Cannabich became a composer and Kapellmeister, and Elisabetha Augusta Cannabich became a singer at the Munich court.

Rose received piano lessons from Wolfgang A. Mozart from November 1777 until March 1778. Mozart and his mother were on a trip to Paris, but stayed for some months in Mannheim to study the orchestra. Mozart wrote to his father on 4 November 1777): "Er hat eine tochter die ganz artig clavier spiellt, und damit ich ihn mir recht zum freünde mache, so arbeite ich iezt an einer Sonata für seine Mad:selle tochter". (He has a daughter who plays the piano rather well, and to make him a friend, I work now on a sonata for his mademoiselle daughter). Mozart wrote about Rose: "... ein sehr schönes artiges mädl. sie hat für ihr alter viell vernunft und geseztes weesen; sie ist serios, redet nicht viell, was sie aber redet – – geschieht mit anmuth und freündlichkeit".) (... A very beautiful and well-behaved girl. For her age she has much good sense, and a demure character; she is serious, and speaks little. But what she does say comes forth with grace and friendliness). It is widely accepted that the sonata dedicated to Rose was his Piano Sonata in C Major, K. 309, (No. 7).

Rose played the solo part of Mozart's Piano Concerto in B-flat major, K. 238, in Mannheim on 13 February 1778. She played in St Petersburg on 20 October 1790, now under her married name Schulz, a piano concerto she had composed, and one by Mozart.

== Sources ==
- Mozart, Wolfgang Amadeus. The Letters of Wolfgang Amadeus Mozart. Edited by Ludwig Nohl. Translated by Lady Wallace. Vol. 1. 2 vols. New York: Hurd and Houghton, 1866.
- Randel, Don Michael (1996). The Harvard biographical dictionary of music. Harvard University Press. p. 133. ISBN 978-0-674-37299-3.

== Bibliography ==
- Slonimsky, Nicolas, ed. Baker's Biographical Dictionary of Musicians. 5th Completely Revised Edition. New York, 1958.
