= Horn Sonata No. 1 (Danzi) =

Composition

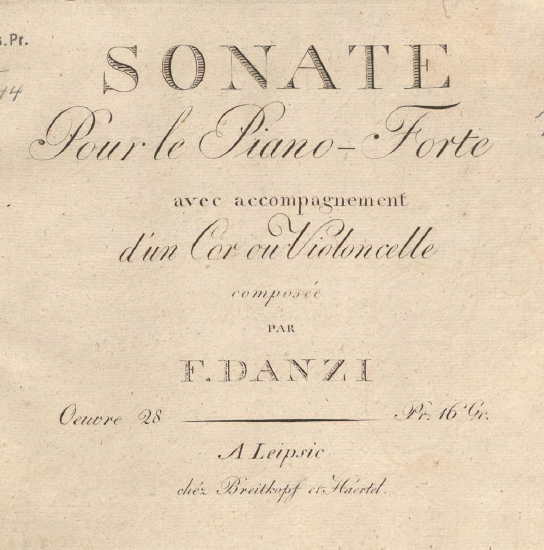
Title page of the first edition of Franz Danzi's Horn Sonata No. 1.

The Horn Sonata No. 1 in E♭ major, Op. 28 is a composition by Franz Danzi published by Breitkopf & Härtel in 1804.

The precise circumstances which led to the composition of the sonata are not known, but it is believed to have been inspired by the success of Beethoven's Horn Sonata, Op. 17. While no specified player has been identified, Tatum in his thesis noted that Danzi had composed many works for Carl Türrschmidt, a virtuoso noted for his ability to exploit the low end of the horn's range and that the sonata contains several passages designed to exploit the lower notes of the horn.

== Music ==
When published as the Sonate pour le Piano-Forte avec accompagnement d'un Cor ou Violoncelle, the horn intended was the natural horn. In modern performances a valve horn is often used. As the original title suggests, the piano is the dominant instrument, although the horn is not purely restricted to an accompanying role.

The composition has three movements:

1. Adagio – Allegro
2. Larghetto
3. Allegretto

A standard performance usually lasts 22–23 minutes.
