= Francesca Lebrun =

German singer and composer (1756–1791)

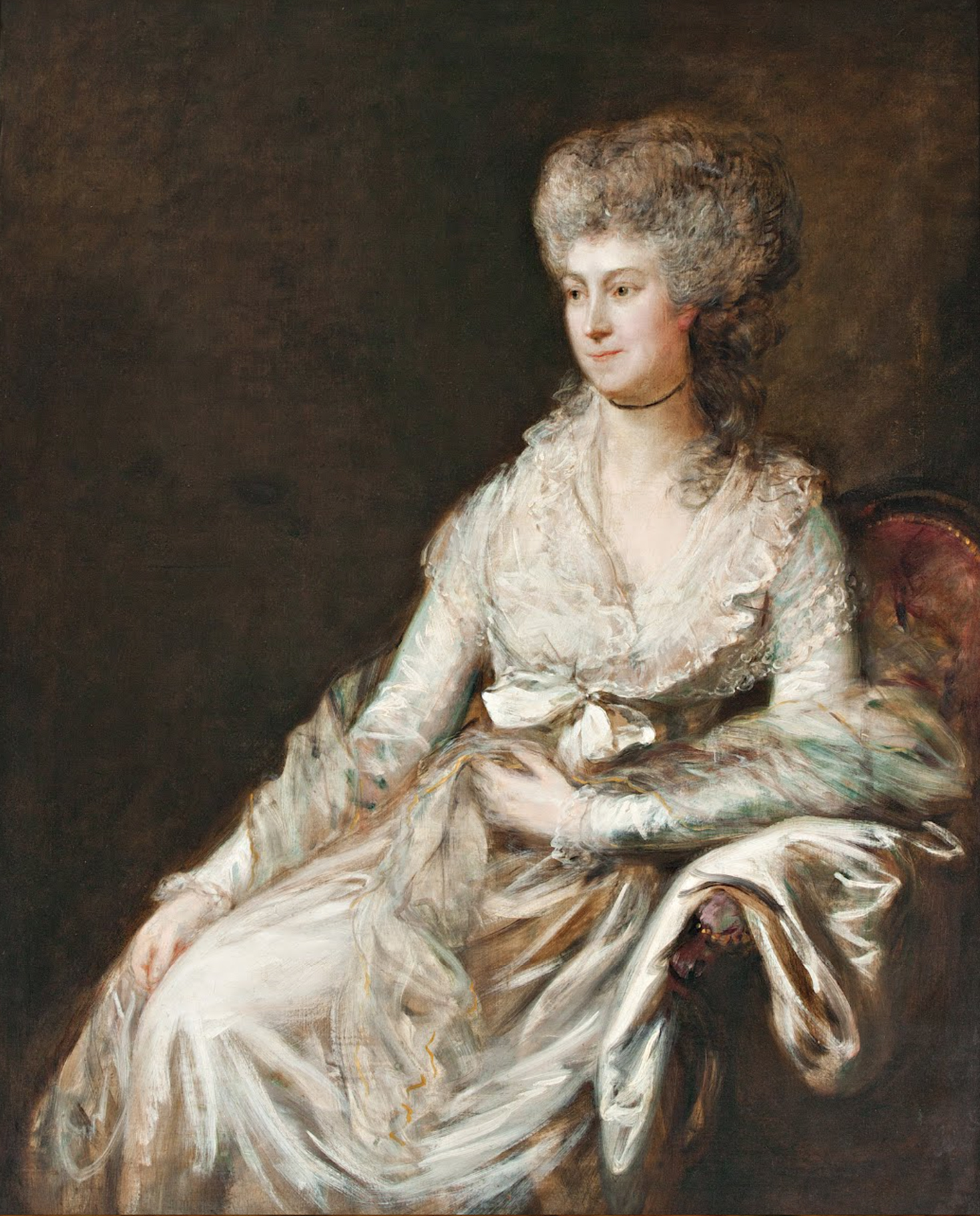
- Francesca Lebrun, in the collection of the Art Gallery of South Australia

Background information
- Born: Franziska Dorothea Danzi; 24 March 1756; Mannheim, Electoral Palatinate, Holy Roman Empire
- Died: 14 May 1791 (aged 35)
- Occupations: Singer and composer
- Instrument: Keyboard

Francesca Lebrun (née Franziska Dorothea Danzi; 24 March 1756 – 14 May 1791) was a celebrated German soprano associated with the court at Mannheim, as well as an accomplished composer of sonatas. As a singer, she was renowned for her vocal dexterity and was highly sought after by such notable composers as Anton Schweitzer, Ignaz Holzbauer, and Antonio Salieri to sing the lead roles in their most challenging operas. As a composer, her twelve sonatas for piano or harpsichord with violin accompaniment, six each in opus 1 and opus 2, were first published in London, England, in 1779–1781, with further editions in London, Paris, and several German centers. The opus 1 sonatas are available in commercial recordings.

== Early life ==
She was born Franziska Dorothea Danzi in Mannheim, Electoral Palatinate (present-day Germany), the eldest child of Italian-born cellist Innocenz Danzi and dancer Barbara Sidonia Margaretha Toeschi, the core of the elite elector Mannheim court performers in the late 1750s. Her two brothers, the cellist Franz Ignaz (1763–1826) and the violinist Johann Baptist, were successful composers. The violinist, composer and conductor Karl Joseph (Carlo Giuseppe) Toeschi was her maternal uncle.

== Career ==
She made her first public appearance as a singer at the age of 16 and the following year was engaged by the Mannheim Opera. There seems to be some debate whether she first performed in Gassmann's L'amore artigiano in May 1772, or Sacchini's La contadina in corte, the role for which she earned the title of court musician (virtuosa da camera). She stayed with the Mannheim court opera for four years and was cast in the premier roles: Parthenia in Schweitzer's Alceste (1775, Schlosstheater Schwetzingen), and Anna in Holzbauer's Günther von Schwarzburg (1777), a role composed specifically for her voice. At twenty-one, she travelled to London to sing four opera series by J. C. Bach and Sacchini.

In 1778, she married the oboe virtuoso and composer Ludwig August Lebrun (1752–1790) from Mannheim. That summer, now known as Signora Lebrun, she toured Italy with Ludwig. At the opening of the Teatro Alla Scala in Milan on 3 August 1778, Francesca Lebrun was the female lead in Antonio Salieri's opera Europa riconosciuta. She created a sensation in 1779 in Paris at the Concert Spirituel through her ability to fit Italian words to instrumental parts of symphonies concertantes and sing them. The Lebruns lived in London from 1779 through 1781 while Francesca appeared at the King's Theatre. In 1780, the celebrated English artist Thomas Gainsborough painted her portrait.

A celebrated coloratura soprano, she sang on major operatic and concert stages through Europe, including England, Germany and Italy, to great acclaim. The musician and writer Christian Friedrich Daniel Schubart noted that she could sing A, three octaves above middle C with "clarity and distinctness". Charles Burney wrote that when she and her husband performed divisions of thirds and sixths it was impossible to discover who was uppermost of the interval.

== Family ==
Francesca's family flourished as well, she gave birth to her daughter Sophie while in London in June 1781, and daughter Rosine in 1783 in Munich. Francesca and Ludwig toured around Europe again in 1785, spending a season in Naples, then Berlin and London where Ludwig died in 1790. She performed only twice after his death and survived him by only five months, dying on 14 May 1791 at the age of 35. She was born and died in the same years as Mozart.

Her daughters also became well known. Rosine Lebrun (1783–1855) was a successful opera singer and actress and was a member of the Munich theatre company, 1801–1830. Sophie [Dülken] (1781–1863) became a well-known pianist and composer, and her daughters and granddaughters also became musicians.

== Discography ==
- Six Sonatas for Fortepiano and Violin, Op. 1. Monica Jakuc (piano), Dana Maiben (violin). Dorian Discovery, 1996.
- Sonata for Piano and Violin, Op. 1, no 2, in E-flat Major. Jaroslav Sveceny (violin), Fine Zimmermann (harpsichord). Women Composers at the Courts Of Europe (Cybele Records, 2000). Both available at CD Universe.
- Sonata for Violin and Piano, op. 1, no. 6 in D Major; Aleksandra Maslovaric (violin), Tania Fleischer (piano). Feminae in Musica, Feminae Records 2007. Available at Arkiv Music.

== Bibliography ==
- Kürschne, Joseph (1883). "Lebrun, Franziska". Allgemeine Deutsche Biographie (in German). Vol. 18.
