= Horn Sonata (Beethoven) =

1800 composition by Ludwig van Beethoven

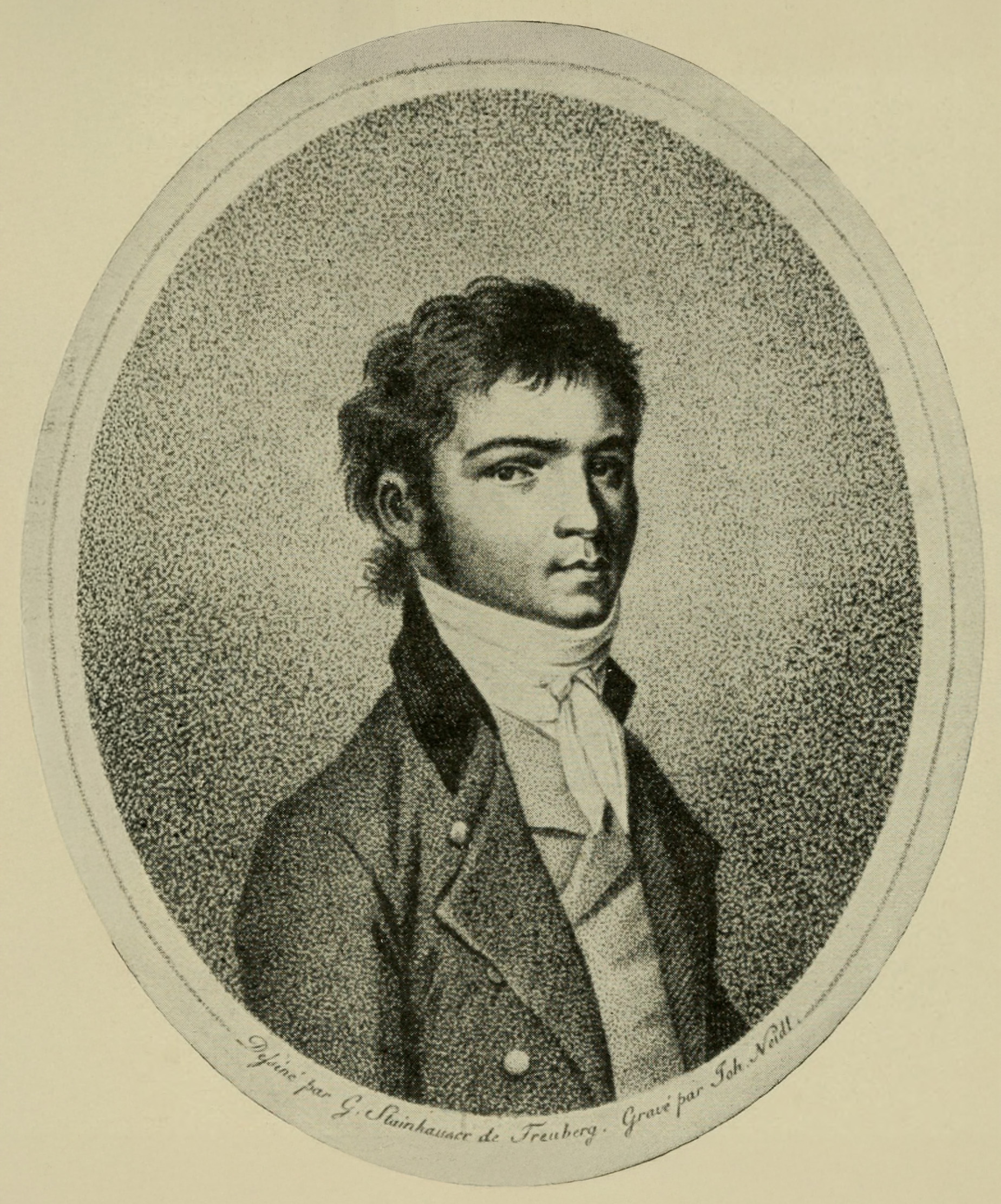
Ludwig van Beethoven, c. 1796

Ludwig van Beethoven composed his Sonata for Pianoforte with Horn, Op. 17 in 1800 for the virtuoso horn player Giovanni Punto. It was premiered by Punto and Beethoven himself in Vienna on April 18, 1800.

Beethoven was not well known outside of Vienna at the time of this composition, and after a performance of the piece in Pest on May 7, 1800, played by Punto and Beethoven, a Hungarian critic wrote, "Who is this Beethover [sic]? His name is not known to us. Of course, Punto is very well known."

== Instrumentation ==
This work was written for the natural horn and in the cor basse idiom, i.e. Beethoven incorporates rapid arpeggios in the first and third movement as well as use of the factitious low G below the second harmonic. These were all traits of cor basse playing, the genre in which Punto specialised.

However, like many works of this period, to broaden the potential market for the work, an arrangement of the sonata for cello was made, probably by Beethoven, for publication. It was then published as "Sonate pour le Forte-Piano avec un Cor ou Violoncelle." Versions for violin, and for flute were also made.

A further arrangement for string quintet was made by oboist Carl Khym for the music publisher Simrock in 1817.

== Structure ==
It consists of three movements:

1. Allegro moderato
2. Poco adagio, quasi andante
3. Rondo - Allegro moderato

A typical performance of the sonata lasts about 15–16 minutes.
