= Christian Cannabich =

German violinist, composer and Kapellmeister (1731–1798)

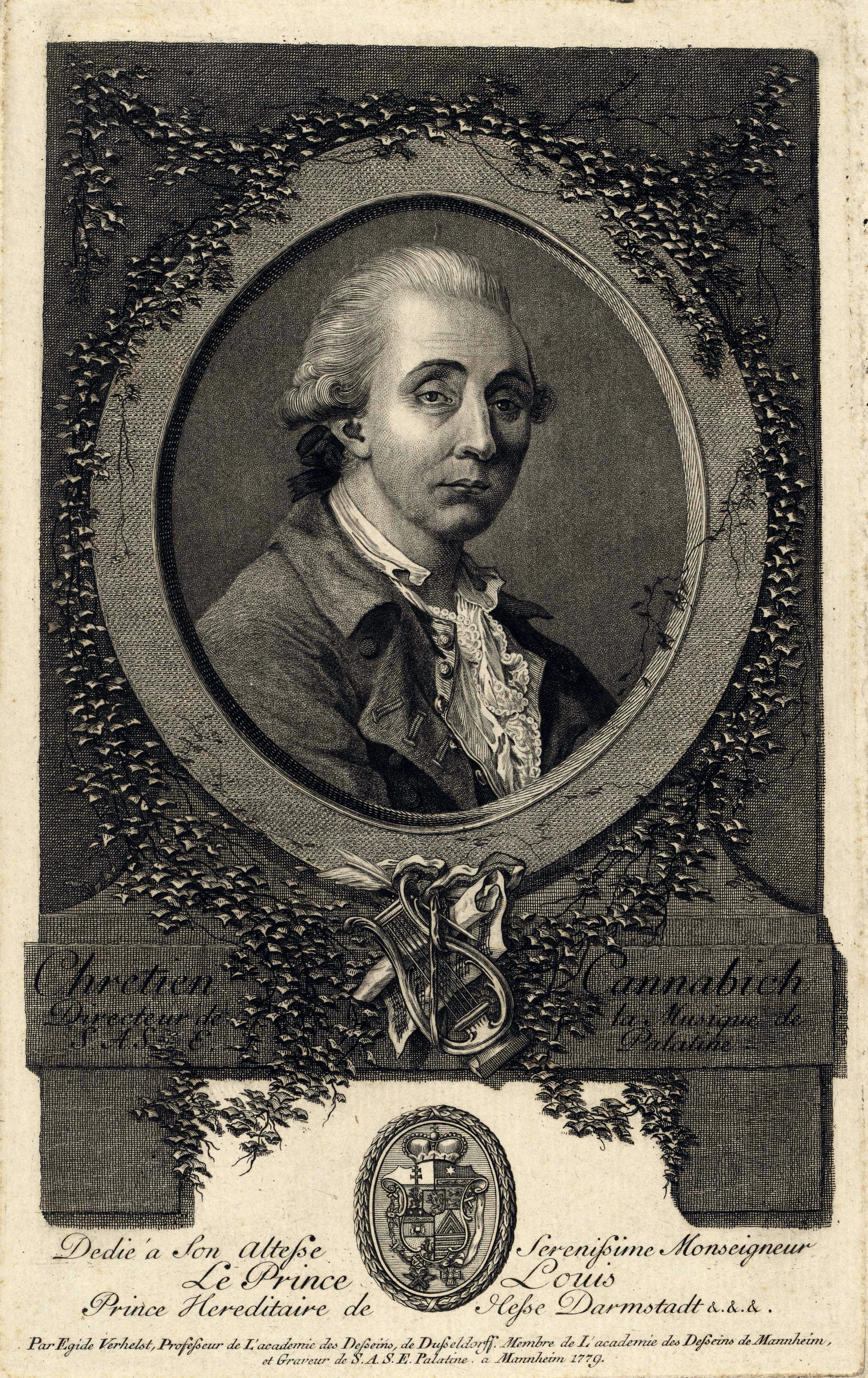
Christian Cannabich – copper engraving by Egid Verhelst 1779

Johann Christian Innocenz Bonaventura Cannabich (baptised 28 December 1731 – 20 January 1798), was a German violinist, composer, and Kapellmeister of the Classical era. A composer of around 200 works, he continued the legacy of Johann Stamitz and helped turn the Mannheim orchestra into what Charles Burney described as "the most complete and best disciplined in Europe." The orchestra was particularly noted for the carefully graduated crescendos and diminuendos characteristic of the Mannheim school. Together with Stamitz and the other composers of the Mannheim court, he helped develop the orchestral texture that paved the way for the orchestral treatment of the First Viennese School.

== Biography ==
=== Background ===
Christian Cannabich was born in Mannheim, the third child of Martin Friedrich Cannabich (1690–1773), a flautist, oboist and music teacher at the Mannheim court. Cannabich's father was the personal flute teacher of the Prince elector Carl Theodor, which in itself created favourable conditions for Christian Cannabich's later career. The family originally hailed from Alsace, which through history, tradition and custom has always had (and still has) close ties to the Palatinate. It is possible that Cannabich's father was bilingual in German and French and that Cannabich as a boy heard and learned both languages in his home. This could explain the relative ease with which Cannabich later moved in French aristocratic circles during his frequent stays in Paris and Versailles.

=== 1742–1756 Education in Mannheim and Rome ===
As a boy, he studied violin with Johann Stamitz (1717–1757), composer, violinist, concertmaster and leader of the Mannheim court orchestra. He joined the violin section of the orchestra as a scholar (i.e. aspirant) at age twelve (1744), becoming a full member two years later. In the year 1748 he is listed in the annual court and state calendar (Churpfälzischer Hof- und Staatskalender) as a violinist living together with his father in Moritz Lane.

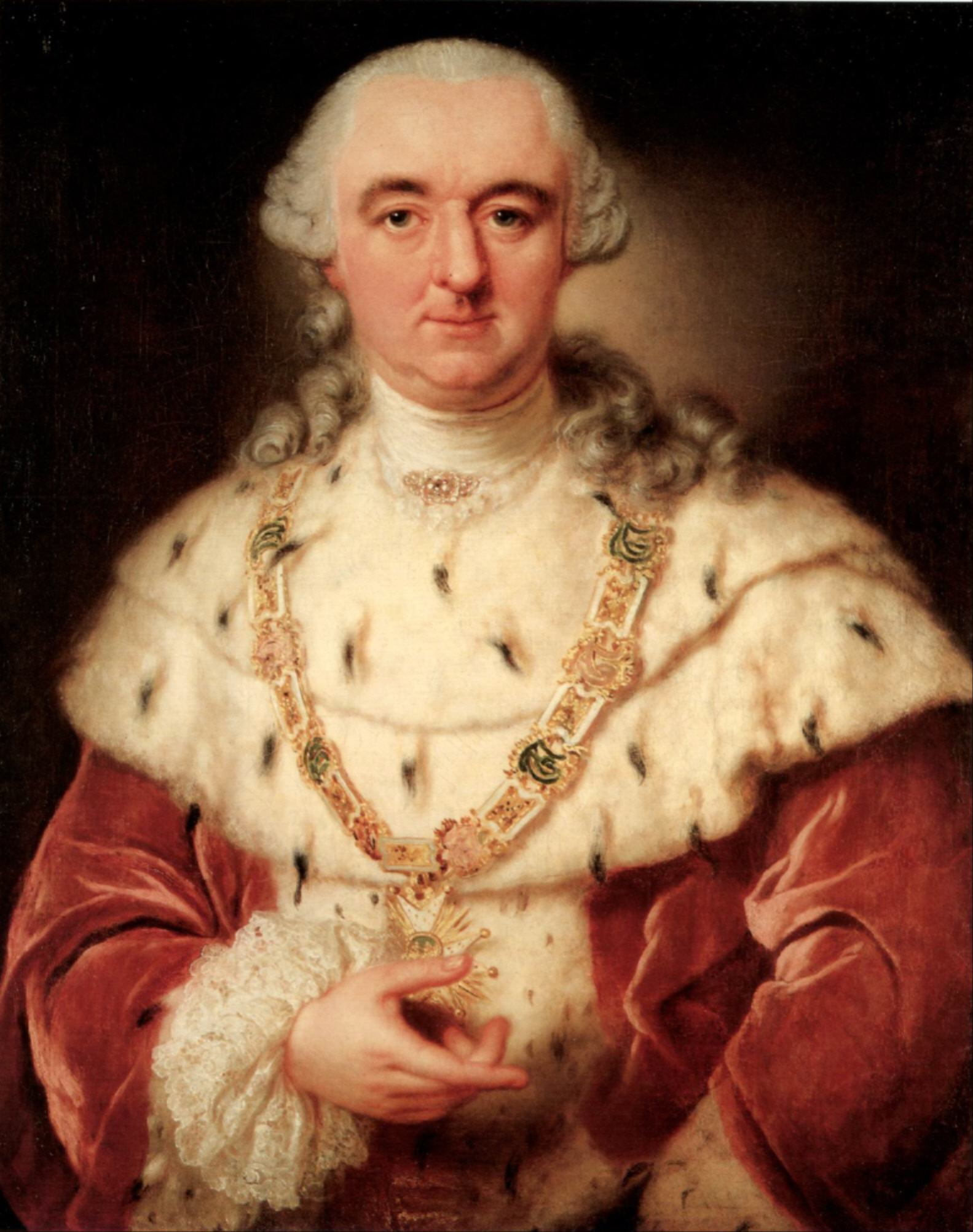
Prince elector Charles Theodore, Cannabich's sovereign and employer

In 1750, Charles Theodore, Prince elector of the Electorate of the Palatinate, sent Cannabich to Rome to continue his studies with Niccolò Jommelli, maestro coadiutore of the Papal Chapel and also a successful opera composer. He remained in Rome until 1753, and followed his teacher to Stuttgart after Jommelli's appointment as Ober-Kapellmeister in the Swabian capital of the court orchestra. In 1756 Cannabich returned to Italy for a second time, this time to Milan, where he undertook additional studies with Giovanni Battista Sammartini.

=== 1757–1773 Concert master ===
In the spring of 1757, after the premature death of Johann Stamitz, he was called back to Mannheim to assume Stamitz's post as first violinist (together with Carl Joseph Toeschi).

In 1759 Cannabich married Maria Elisabeth de la Motte, lady of the bed chamber to the Duchess of Zweibrücken. They had six children, one of them being Carl Cannabich, later a composer in his own right. From November 1777 until March 1778, their daughter Rose received piano lessons from Mozart, whose piano sonata No. 7 in C major is dedicated to her. Although Cannabich lived very much in the Age of Enlightenment, which allowed and even fostered a certain permeability between the social classes, it was then still unusual for a man of common birth to marry a titled woman. It turned out that this conjugal alliance would have important and far-reaching consequences for Cannabich.

Duke Christian IV of nearby Zweibrücken took a liking to Cannabich and favoured him with support and attention. In 1764 he accompanied the Duke, who owned a palace there, to Paris. Music and musicians from Mannheim were popular with Parisian audiences. It was during this journey that Cannabich met the Mozarts who, then on their family grand tour, spent the time between November 1763 and April 1764 in the French capital. During the 1760s and 1770s, Cannabich visited Paris frequently, had his music performed at the Concert Spirituel, and his symphonies and trios printed there. Most of Cannabich's works after this date were published in Paris.

=== 1774–1798 Director of the Mannheim Orchestra ===
In 1774 Cannabich became director of the Mannheim court orchestra; as such he not only led the orchestra as concertmaster, but also had the duty to compose the ballet music for the court ballets choreographed by Etienne Lauchery, the Maître de Danse (court ballet master). Four years later (1778) he moved with the court to Munich when Charles Theodore, his lord and master, became elector of Bavaria. Cannabich continued with his duties in Munich as before, but the best years of the Mannheim orchestra were by then all but over.

In the 1780s the elector cut back on the orchestra's budget and reduced the number of musicians from 95 to 55. The musicians complained about cutbacks in payment and reduced income. It is alleged that Cannabich himself had to live on one-third of his former stipend during the last years of his life, which forced the aged musician to go on concert tours and, perhaps for the first time in his life, to do what other, less fortunate musicians had to do all their lives — scramble for money.

Cannabich died while visiting his son, Carl, in Frankfurt am Main in 1798.

== Cannabich and Mozart ==
Cannabich and Mozart met several times over a period of twenty years. The second time was in the early months of 1777-78, when Mozart was on his ill-fated journey, first to Mannheim and thence to Paris. Accompanied by his mother (his father, Leopold Mozart, had to stay behind to earn the money for this trip), Mozart had left Salzburg looking for wealth and fame — and above all a position with one of the many German princes. It was no surprise that Mozart and his mother extended their stay in Mannheim. In the late 18th century, Mannheim had the best and most famous orchestra in all of Europe. Excellent musicians and composers (many of them from Bohemia) with a strict and relentless drilling method, alongside a huge budget from the elector of the Electorate of the Palatinate, had turned what had been just one of many princely orchestras into a mighty and smoothly running ensemble. Ladies reportedly fainted when the Mannheimers unleashed their roaring crescendo — just one of many orchestral devices that was invented there.

Mozart himself praised the orchestra on numerous occasions. In a letter to his father, he wrote:

"I must now tell you about the music here. On Saturday, All-Saints' day, I attended high mass. The orchestra is very good and numerous. On each side 10 or 11 violins, 4 violas, 2 oboes, 2 flutes, and 2 clarinets, 2 horns, 4 cellos, 4 bassoons, and 4 double basses, besides trumpets and kettledrums. This should make for beautiful music - ..."

== Works (selection) ==
Operas

- Azaki (1778)
- Electra (1781)
- Angelika, operetta (unknown year)

Ballets

- Ceyx et Alcyone (1762)
- Renaud et Armide (1768)
- Roland furieux, ou Angélique et Médor (1768)
- Le rendez-vous (1769, possibly earlier)
- Les mariages samni(s)tes (1772)
- Médée et Jason (1772)
- Admette et Alceste (1775)
- L’embarquement pour Cythère, ou Le triomphe de Vénus (1775)
- Orphée dans l’isle de Sirènes (1775)
- Les fêtes du serailles (unknown year)

Orchestral music

- 76 symphonies
- 3 violin concertos

Chamber music

- 12 string quartets
- 6 piano trios
- 30 sonatas for piano and violin

== Discography (selection) ==
- Christian Cannabich: Symphonies Nos. 47 - 52. Nicolaus Esterhazy Sinfonia, Conductor: Uwe Grodd. Naxos 8.554340
- Christian Cannabich: Symphonies Nos. 59, 63, 64, 67 and 68. Lukas Consort, Conductor: Viktor Lukas. NAXOS 8.553960
- Christian Cannabich: Orchestral Works, Sinfonia in D Major & G Major, Sinfonia Concertante in E flat Major and Concerto in C Major. Kurpfalzisches Kammerorchester, Conductor: Jiri Malat. Arte Nova 74321 61337 2.

== Sources ==
- Burney, Charles. General History Of Music From The Earliest Ages To The Present Period (1789). Edited by Frank Mercer. Vol. 2. 2 vols. New York: Dover Publications, 1957.
- Mozart, Wolfgang Amadeus. The Letters of Wolfgang Amadeus Mozart. Edited by Ludwig Nohl. Translated by Lady Wallace. Vol. 1. 2 vols. New York: Hurd and Houghton, 1866.
- Randel, Don Michael (1996). The Harvard biographical dictionary of music. Harvard University Press. p. 133. ISBN 978-0-674-37299-3.
- Slonimsky, Nicolas, ed. Baker's Biographical Dictionary of Musicians. 5th Completely Revised Edition. New York, 1958.
