= Carl Cannabich =

German composer (1771–1806)

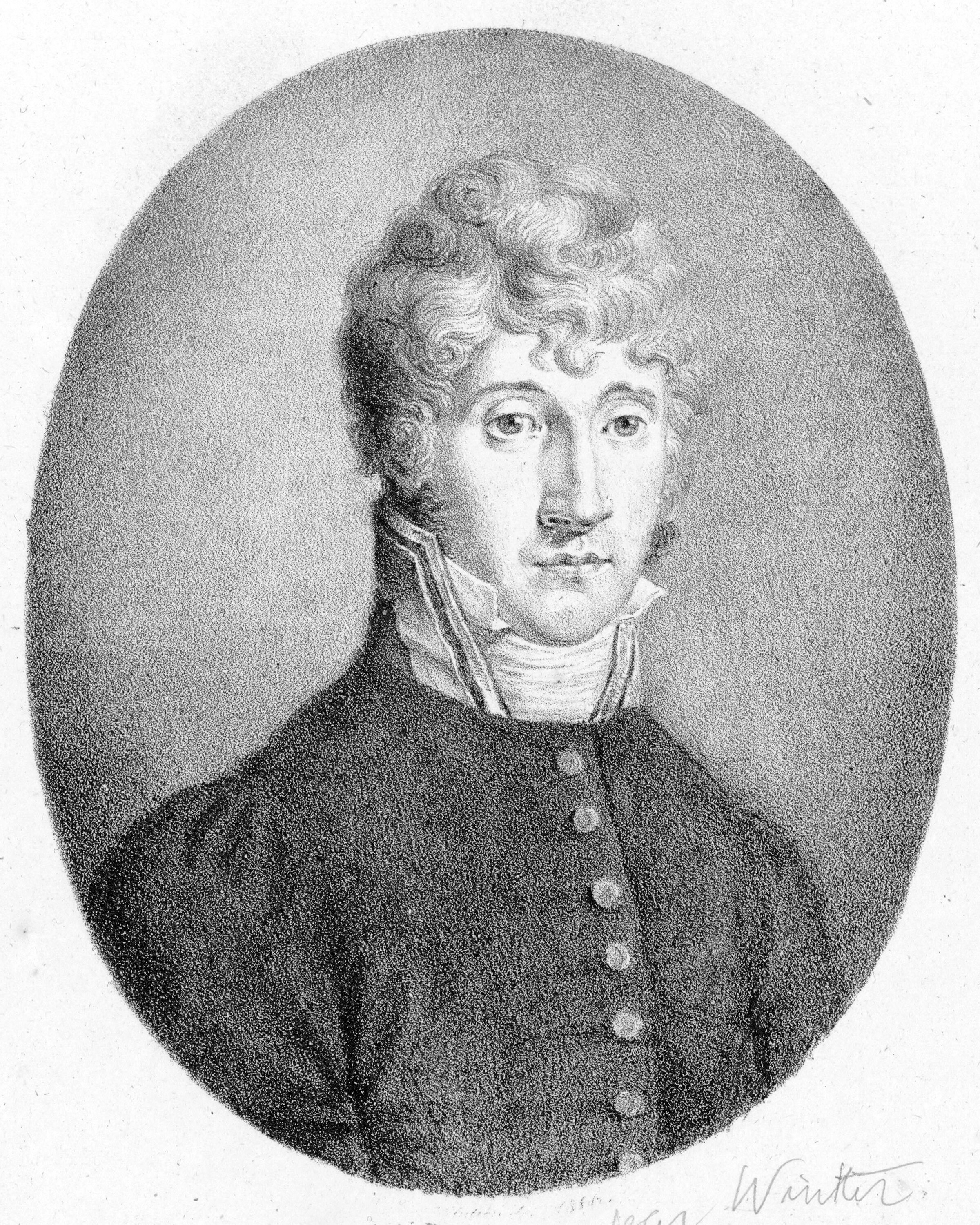
Carl Cannabich

Carl August Konrad Cannabich (christened on 11 October 1771 – 1 May 1806) was a German composer, violinist, concertmaster and music director.

== Family ==
Born in Mannheim, Cannabich was the son of the court music director Christian Cannabich, one of the most renowned composers of the Mannheim school. His grandfather was the court musician Martin Friedrich Cannabich, his sister Rose was a pianist and his sister Augusta Elisabeth a singer. He was married to the soprano Josephine Woraleck (1781-1830), the daughter of the composer Nicklas Woraleck.

== Life ==
In 1778 he moved with his parents to Munich. From the age of four he played piano and violin and at the age of nine received violin lessons from Johann Friedrich Eck. He later studied composition with Joseph Graetz and Peter von Winter. Already at the age of 12 he made a concert tour through Germany together with Ludwig August Lebrun. In 1785 he travelled to Italy for two years to further his musical education.

In 1788 he joined the Munich Court Orchestra as a violinist. In 1796 he worked as a theatre Kapellmeister in Frankfurt, where he also met his wife and married. In 1798 he received the title of churpfalzbaierischer Conzertmeister, was ordered back to Munich in 1800 and appointed court music director in 1801. In 1805 he made a trip to Paris. After his return he fell ill with nervous fever and died shortly afterwards in Munich at the early age of 34.

Among other things he composed the ballet music for the performances of Antonio Salieri's Axur, re d'Ormus in 1801.
