= Franz Danzi =

German conductor and composer (1763–1826)

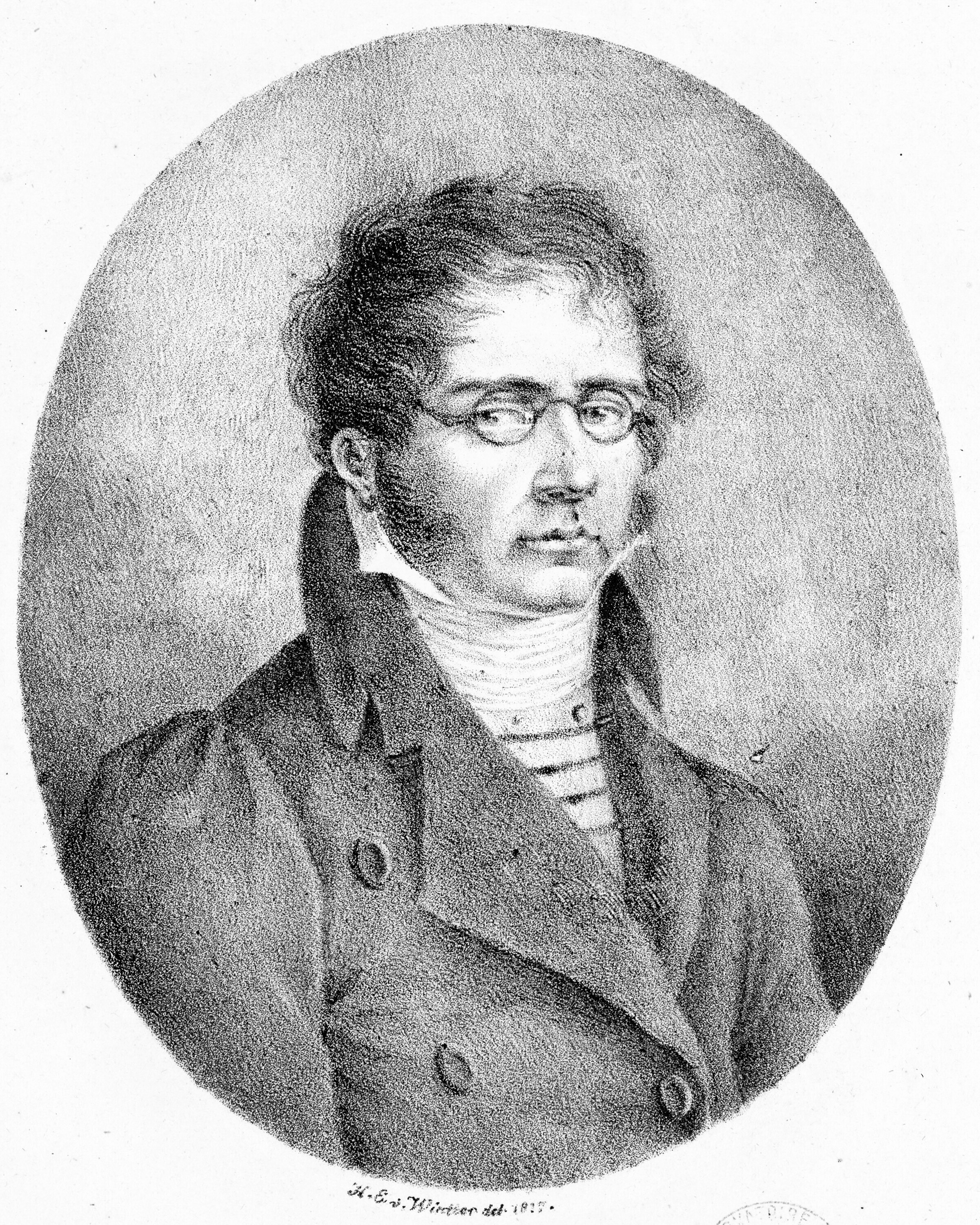
- Born: Franz Ignaz Danzi; June 15, 1763; Mannheim, Baden-Württemberg, Germany
- Died: April 13, 1826 (aged 62); Karlsruhe, Baden-Württemberg, Germany
- Occupations: Cellist; composer
- Spouse(s): Margarethe Danzi, (1790)
- Relatives: Francesca Lebrun (sister)

Franz Ignaz Danzi (15 June 1763 – 13 April 1826) was a German cellist, composer and conductor, the son of the Italian cellist Innocenz Danzi (1730–1798) and brother of the noted singer Franziska Danzi.

Danzi lived at a significant time in the history of European music. His career, spanning the transition from the late Classical to the early Romantic styles, coincided with the origin of much of the music that lives in our concert halls and is familiar to contemporary classical-music audiences. In his youth he knew Wolfgang Amadeus Mozart, whom he revered; he was a contemporary of Ludwig van Beethoven, about whom he — like many of his generation — had strong but mixed feelings and he was a mentor for the young Carl Maria von Weber, whose music he respected and promoted.

== Life and career ==
Born in Schwetzingen and raised in Mannheim, Danzi studied with his father and with Georg Joseph Vogler before he joined the superlative orchestra of the Elector Karl Theodor in 1778 as a teenager.

In 1780, the first of his woodwind compositions was published at Mannheim. His father, principal cellist of the orchestra, was praised by Mozart for his playing at the premiere of Idomeneo. Danzi remained behind in a Mannheim that was rendered more provincial when Karl Theodor moved his court to Munich in 1778. After an apprenticeship with the small theatre orchestra left in Mannheim, he rejoined the main court in Munich as principal cellist — taking his father's position — in 1784.

In 1790, he married the singer and composer Maria Margarethe Marchand, with whom he travelled in an opera troupe to Leipzig, Prague, Venice, and Florence.

By 1798, once more in Munich, he rose to the position of assistant Kapellmeister in one of the most important musical centers of Europe. In 1807, unhappy at the treatment he received at court and despairing of any further advancement, he left Munich to be Kapellmeister in the smaller and less important Stuttgart court of the new king of Württemberg, Frederick I, where he supported and influenced the work of Carl Maria von Weber.

In 1812, he moved again to Karlsruhe, where he spent the last years of his life at the Royal Konservatorium struggling to raise the modest courtly musical establishment to respectability.

== Death ==
On April 13, 1826, he died in Karlsruhe, aged 62.

== Contribution ==
Danzi is known today chiefly for his woodwind quintets, in which he took justifiable pride for the idiomatic treatment of the individual instruments. He composed in most major genres of the time, including opera, church music, orchestral works, and many varieties of chamber music. He was a first-rate cellist as well as a conscientious and — by all reports — effective orchestra leader and conductor.

At Schwetzingen, the city concert hall was renamed in his honour in 2005.

== Selected works ==
Wind Quintet Op. 67 No. 2 in E minor - 1. Allegro vivo
Performed by the Soni Ventorum Wind Quintet

Wind Quintet Op. 67 No. 2 in E minor - 2. Larghetto
Performed by the Soni Ventorum Wind Quintet

Wind Quintet Op. 67 No. 2 in E minor - 3. Menuetto allegretto
Performed by the Soni Ventorum Wind Quintet

Wind Quintet Op. 67 No. 2 in E minor - 4. Allegretto
Performed by the Soni Ventorum Wind Quintet

Wind Quintet Op. 67 No. 3 in E-flat major - 1. Larghetto - Allegro moderato
Performed by the Soni Ventorum Wind Quintet

Wind Quintet Op. 67 No. 3 in E-flat major - 2. Andante moderato
Performed by the Soni Ventorum Wind Quintet

Wind Quintet Op. 67 No. 3 in E-flat major - 3. Menuetto (Allegro)
Performed by the Soni Ventorum Wind Quintet

Wind Quintet Op. 67 No. 3 in E-flat major - 4. Allegretto
Performed by the Soni Ventorum Wind Quintet

Among his compositions are:

- Symphonie Concertante in E♭ major for Wind Quintet and Orchestra (1785)
- 3 String Quartets, Op. 5
- 6 String Quartets, Op. 6
- 3 Duos for viola and cello (book 1)
- 3 Duos for viola and cello, Op. 9 (book 2)
- Wind Sextet in E♭ major, Op. 10
- Septet in E♭ major, Op. 10 (arrangement of Sextet, Op. 10)
- Septet in E major, Op. 15
- Sinfonia in C major for Orchestra, Op. 25 (Danzi wrote 8 Sinfonias)
- Horn Sonata in E♭ major, Op. 28 (c.1804)
- 3 String Quartets, Op. 29
- Flute Concerto No. 1 in G major, Op. 30
- Flute Concerto No. 2 in D minor, Op. 31
- 3 Quartets for Bassoon and Strings, Op. 40
- Quintet in D minor for Piano and Winds, Op. 41
- Symphonie Concertante in B♭ major for Flute, Clarinet and Orchestra, Op. 41
- Flute Concerto No. 3 in D minor, Op. 42
- Flute Concerto No. 4 in D major, Op. 43
- Sonata concertante in E minor for Horn and Piano, Op. 44
- 3 Potpourris for Clarinet and Orchestra, Op. 45 (1814)
- Concertino, for Clarinet, Solo Bassoon and Chamber Band, Op. 47
- Quintet in F major for Piano and Winds, Op. 53
- Quintet in D major for Piano and Winds, Op. 54
- 3 Wind Quintets, Op. 56
- 6 String Quintets (with 2 violas), Op. 66
- 3 Wind Quintets, Op. 67
- 3 Wind Quintets, Op. 68
- 3 Trios for Flute and Strings, Op. 71
- 4 Bassoon Concertos
- Cello Concerto in A major
- Cello Concerto in E minor
- Horn Concerto in E major
- Ouvertüre in E major for Orchestra
- Piano Concerto in E♭ major
- Sonata in D major for 2 Organs
- Sonatina in D major for Flute and Piano
- Sonata for Clarinet and Piano in B♭ major "Sonata Concertante"
- Sinfonia Concertante in E♭ major for Flute, Oboe, Horn, Bassoon and Orchestra
- 6 Pieces Faciles for Piano, Op. 73
- 4 Arias from Operas by Mozart (arranged by Danzi for 2 cellos)
